= John Singleton Copley =

American-born British painter (1738–1815)

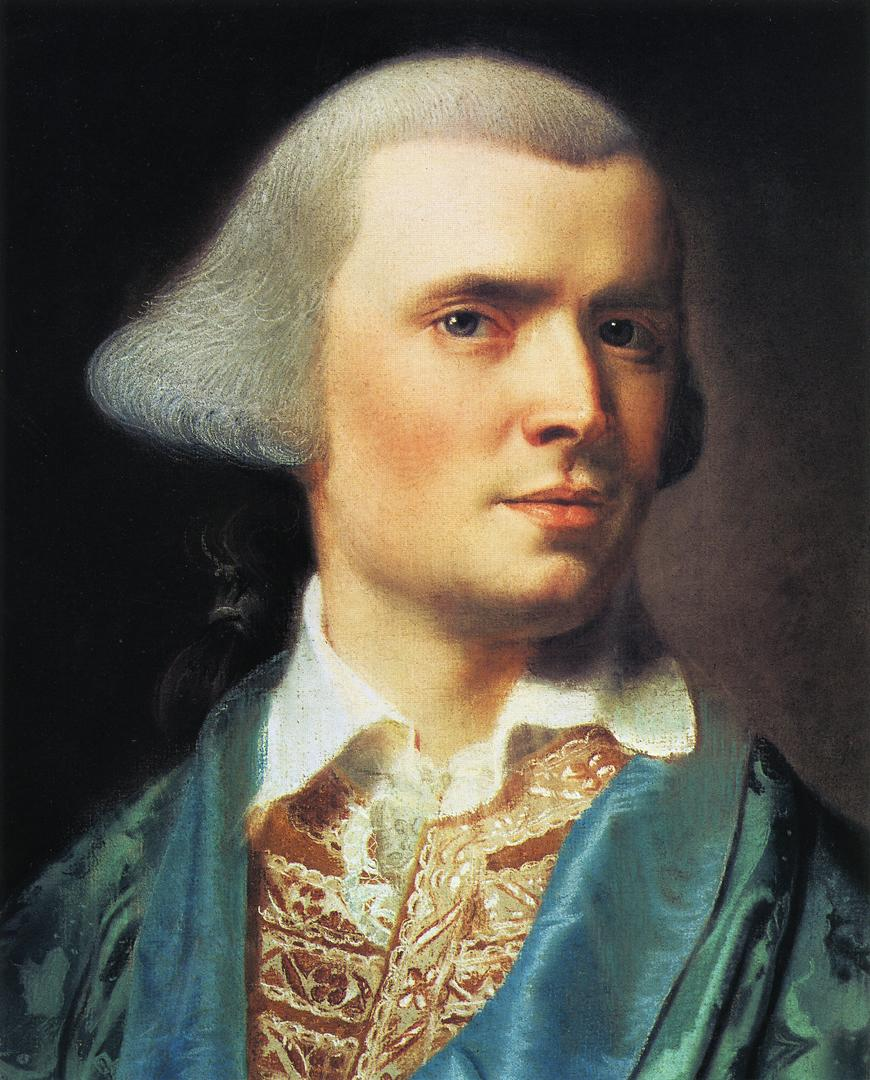
- Self-portrait, c. 1769
- Born: July 3, 1738; Boston, Province of Massachusetts Bay
- Died: September 9, 1815 (aged 77); London, England, United Kingdom
- Education: Peter Pelham
- Known for: Portrait painting
- Notable work: Watson and the Shark (1778)
- Spouse: Susanna Clark
- Children: John Copley, 1st Baron Lyndhurst
- Parent(s): Richard Copley and Mary Singleton Copley

John Singleton Copley /ˈkɑːpli/ RA (July 3, 1738 – September 9, 1815) was an American-born British painter active in both the Thirteen Colonies and England. He is believed to have been born in Boston, Province of Massachusetts Bay, to Richard and Mary Singleton Copley, both Anglo-Irish. After becoming well-established as a portrait painter of the wealthy in colonial New England, he moved to London in 1774, never returning to America. In London, he met considerable success as a portraitist for the next two decades, and also painted a number of large history paintings, which were innovative in their readiness to depict modern subjects and modern dress. His later years were less successful, and he died heavily in debt. He was father of John Copley, 1st Baron Lyndhurst and half-brother of Henry Pelham, the American painter, engraver, and cartographer.

== Biography ==
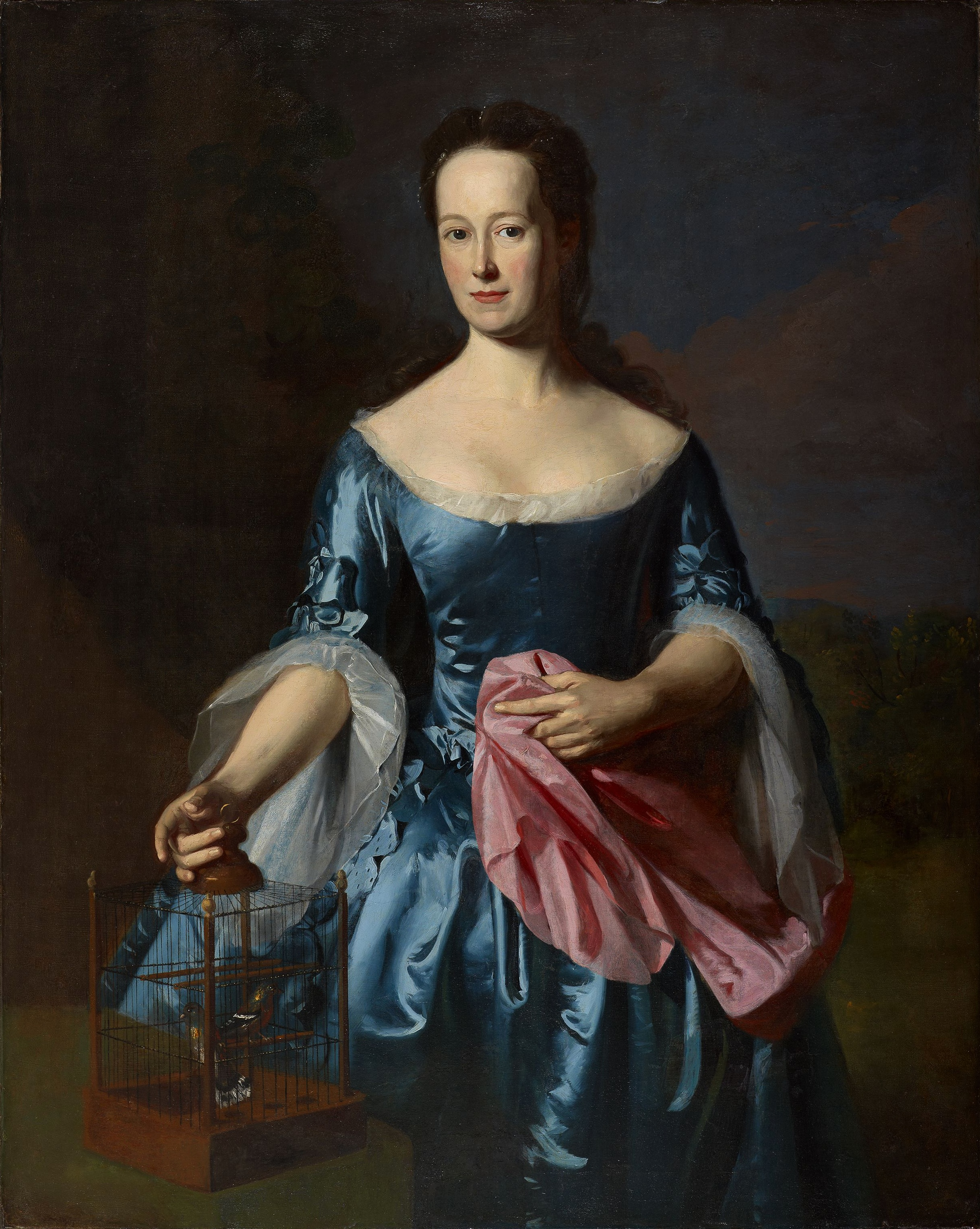
Portrait of Ann Fairchild Bowler (1758)

=== Early life ===
Copley's mother owned a tobacco shop in Boston, Massachusetts, on Long Wharf. The parents, who, according to the artist's granddaughter Martha Babcock Amory, had come to Boston in 1736, were "engaged in trade, like almost all the inhabitants of the North American colonies at that time". His father was from Limerick; his mother, of the Singletons of County Clare, a family of Lancashire origin. Letters from John Singleton, Mrs. Copley's father, are in the Copley-Pelham collection. Richard Copley, described as a tobacconist, is said by several biographers to have arrived in Boston in ill health and to have gone, about the time of John's birth, to the West Indies, where he died. William H. Whitmore gives his death as of 1748, the year of Mrs. Copley's remarriage. James Bernard Cullen says: "Richard Copley was in poor health on his arrival in America and went to the West Indies to improve his failing strength. He died there in 1737." No contemporary evidence has been located for either year.

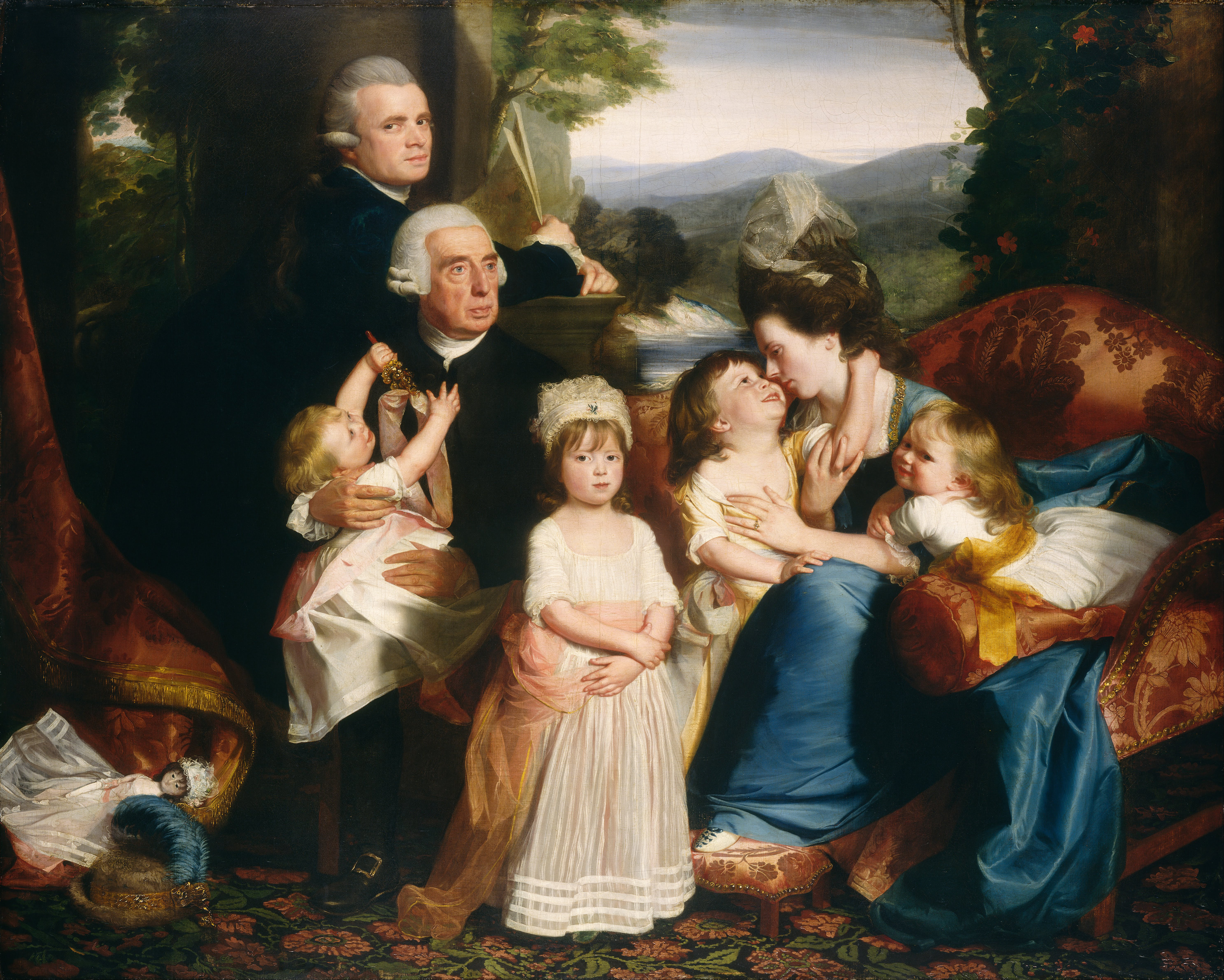
The Copley Family (1777)

Except for a family tradition that speaks of his precocity in drawing, nothing is known of Copley's schooling or of the other activities of his boyhood. His letters, the earliest of which is dated September 30, 1762, reveal a fairly well-educated man. He may have been taught various subjects, it is reasonably conjectured, by his future stepfather, who, besides painting portraits and cutting engravings, eked out a living in Boston by teaching dancing and, beginning September 12, 1743, by conducting an "Evening Writing and Arithmetic School", duly advertised. It is certain that the widow Copley was married to Peter Pelham on May 22, 1748, and that at about that time she transferred her tobacco business to his house in Lindall Street (a quieter, more respectable part of town), at which the evening school also continued its sessions. In such a household young Copley may have learned to use the paintbrush and the engraver's tools. Whitmore says plausibly: "Copley at the age of fifteen was able to engrave in mezzotint; his stepfather Pelham, with whom he lived three years, was an excellent engraver and skillful also with the brush." The family lived next to the house occupied by japanner Thomas Johnston and his family, and Copley became friends with Thomas's son William, later to become a painter himself.

The artistic opportunities of the home and town in which Copley grew to manhood should be emphasized because he himself, as well as some of his biographers taking him too literally, have made much of the bleakness of his early surroundings. His son, Lord Lyndhurst, wrote that "he (Copley) was entirely self taught, and never saw a decent picture, with the exception of his own, until he was nearly thirty years of age." Copley himself complained, in a letter to Benjamin West, written November 12, 1766: "In this Country as You rightly observe there is no examples of Art, except what is to [be] met with in a few prints indifferently exicuted, from which it is not possable to learn much." Variants of this thesis are found almost everywhere in his earlier letters. They suggest that, while Copley was industrious and an able executant, he was physically unadventurous and temperamentally inclined toward brooding and self-pity. He could have seen at least a few good paintings and many good prints in the Boston of his youth. The excellence of his own portraits was not accidental or miraculous; it had an academic foundation. A book of Copley's studies of the figure, now at the British Museum, proves that before he was twenty, whether with or without help from a teacher, he was making anatomical drawings with much care and precision. It is likely that through the fortunate associations of a home and workshop in a town which had many craftsmen, he had already learned his trade at an age when the average art student of a later era was only beginning to draw.

=== Rising reputation ===
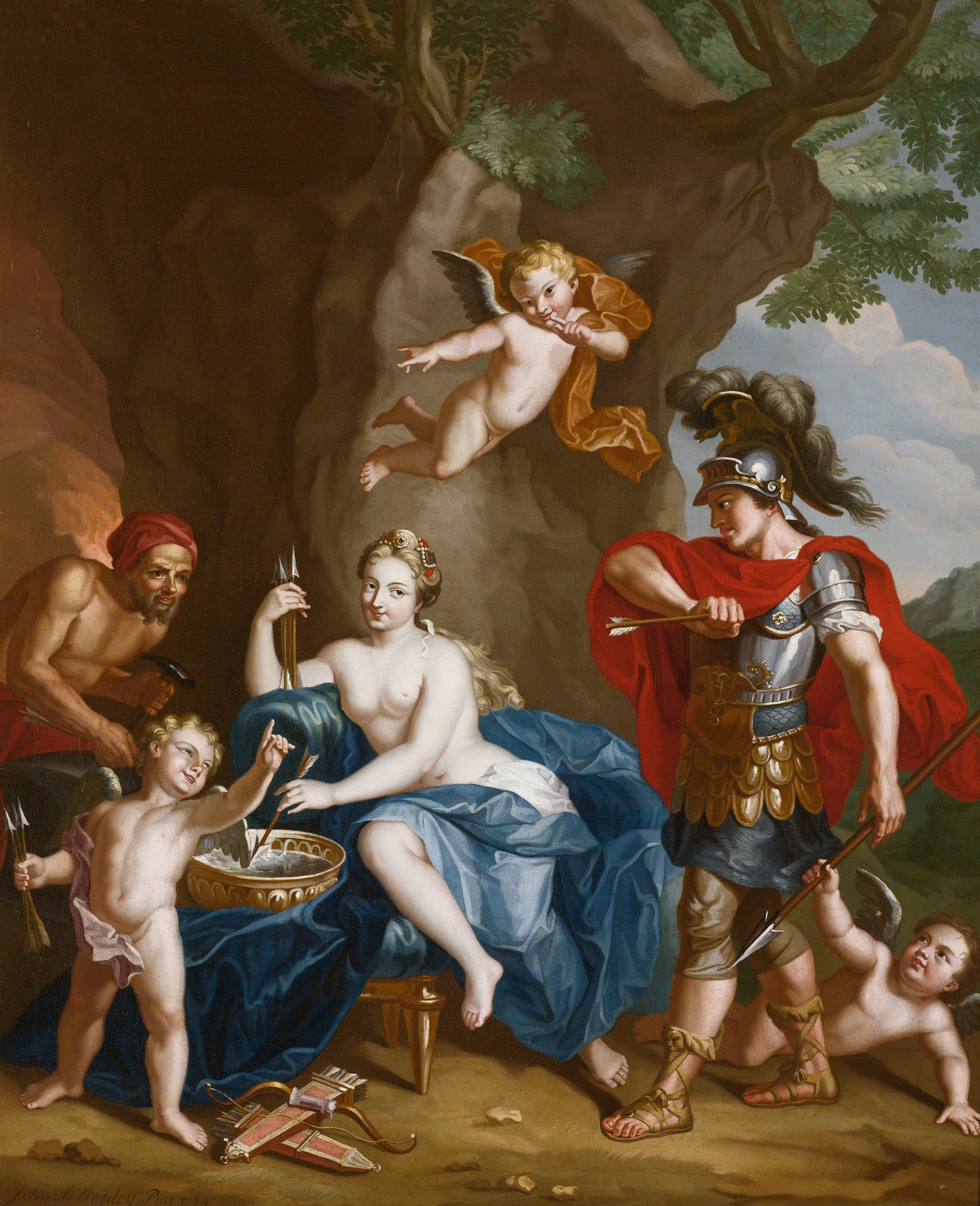
Mars, Venus and Vulcan (1754) (Kalamazoo Institute of Arts)

Copley was about fourteen and his stepfather had recently died, when he made the earliest of his portraits now preserved, a likeness of his half-brother Charles Pelham, good in color and characterization though it has in its background accessories which are somewhat out of drawing. It is a remarkable work to have come from so young a hand. The artist was only fifteen when (it is believed) he painted the portrait of the Rev. William Welsteed, minister of the Brick Church in Long Lane, a work which, following Peter Pelham's practise, Copley personally engraved to get the benefit from the sale of prints. No other engraving has been attributed to Copley. A self-portrait, undated, depicting a boy of about seventeen in broken straw hat, and a painting of Mars, Venus and Vulcan, signed and dated 1754, disclose crudities of execution which do not obscure the decorative intent and documentary value of the works. Such painting would obviously advertise itself anywhere. Without going after business, for his letters do not indicate that he was ever aggressive or pushy, Copley was started as a professional portrait-painter long before he was of age. In October 1757, Capt. Thomas Ainslie, collector of the Port of Quebec, acknowledged from Halifax the receipt of his portrait, which "gives me great Satisfaction", and advised the artist to visit Nova Scotia "where there are several people who would be glad to employ You." This request to paint in Canada was later repeated from Quebec, Copley replying: "I should receive a singular pleasure in excepting, if my Business was anyways slack, but it is so far otherwise that I have a large Room full of Pictures unfinished, which would ingage me these twelve months if I did not begin any others."

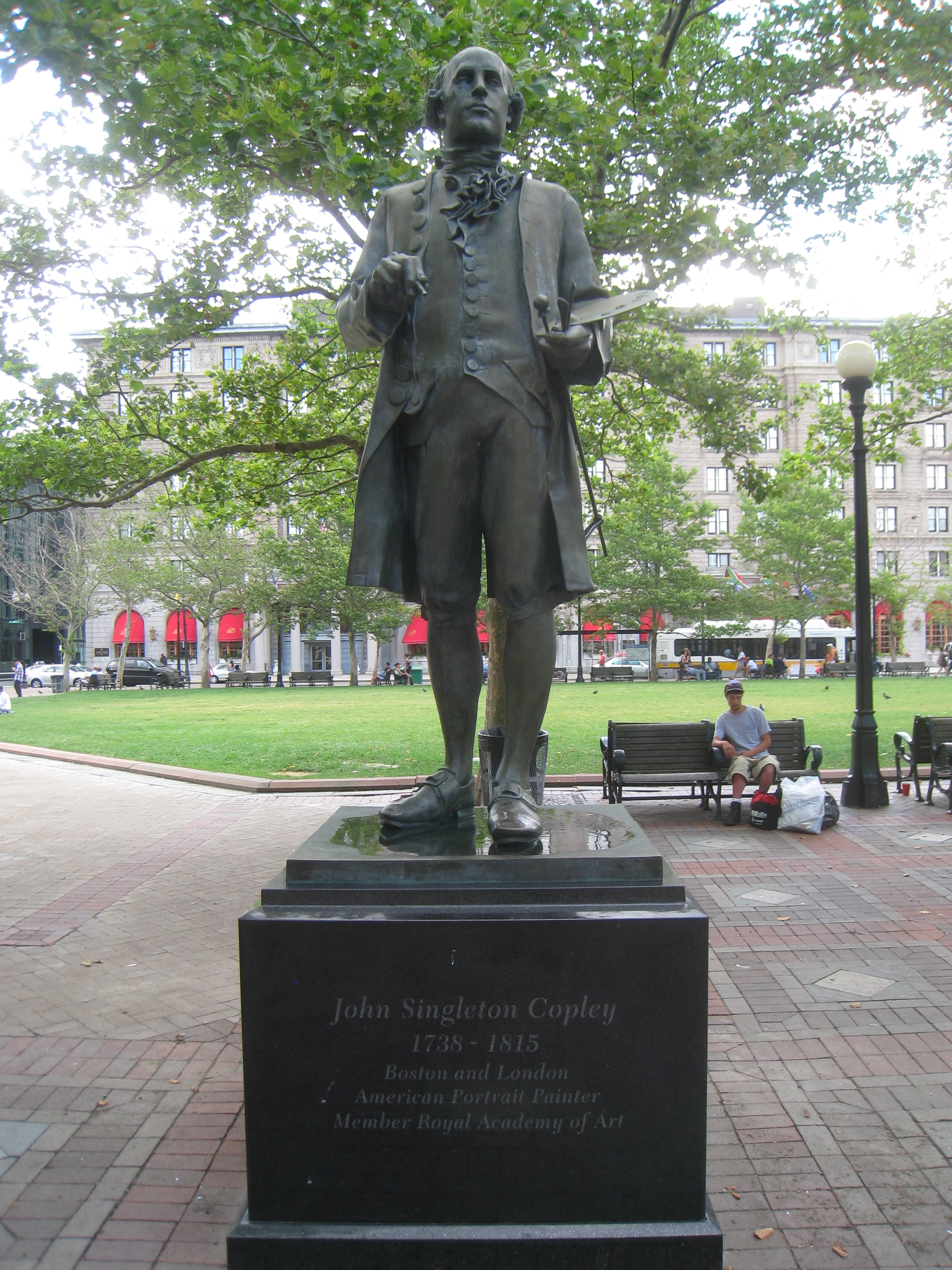
Statue of Copley in Copley Square, Boston, Massachusetts.

Besides painting portraits in oil, doubtless after a formula learned from Peter Pelham, Copley was a pioneer American pastellist. He wrote, on September 30, 1762, to the Swiss painter Jean-Étienne Liotard, asking him for "a sett of the best Swiss Crayons for drawing of Portraits." The young American anticipated Liotard's surprise "that so remote a corner of the Globe as New England should have any demand for the necessary eutensils for practiceing the fine Arts" by assuring him that "America which has been the seat of war and desolation, I would fain hope will one Day become the School of fine Arts." The requested pastels were duly received and used by Copley in making many portraits in a medium suited to his talent. By this time he had begun to demonstrate his genius for rendering surface textures and capturing emotional immediacy.

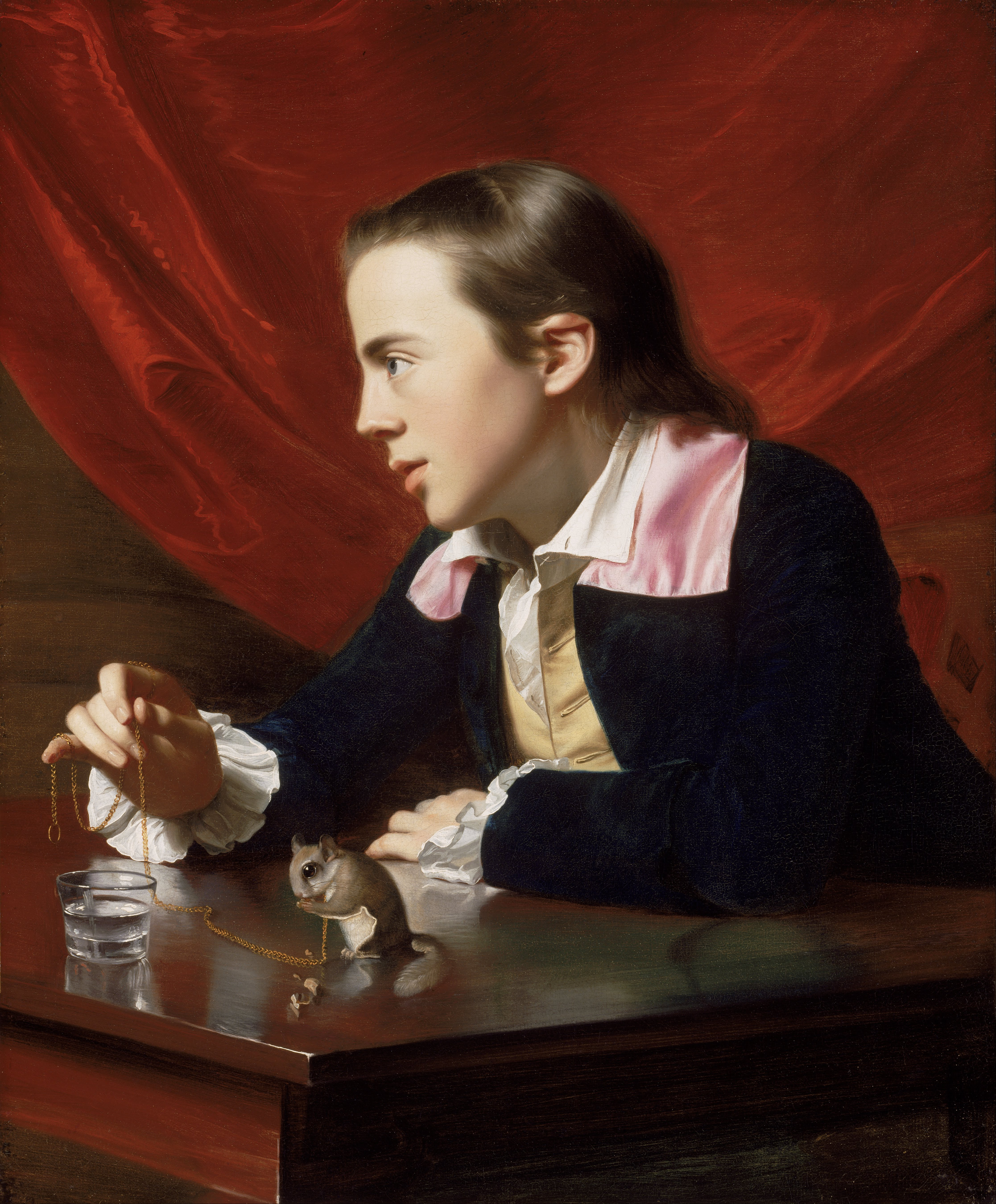
A Boy with a Flying Squirrel (Henry Pelham) (1765)

Copley's fame was established in England by the exhibition, in 1766, of A Boy with a Flying Squirrel, which depicted his half-brother, Henry Pelham, seated at a table and playing with a pet squirrel. This picture, which made the young Boston painter a Fellow of the Society of Artists of Great Britain, by vote of September 3, 1766, had been painted the preceding year. Copley's letter of September 3, 1765, to Capt. R. G. Bruce, of the John and Sukey, reveals that it was taken to England as a personal favor in the luggage of Roger Hale, surveyor of the port of London. An anecdote relates that the painting, unaccompanied by name or letter of instructions, was delivered to Benjamin West (whom Mrs. Amory describes as then "a member of the Royal Academy," though the academy was not yet in existence). West is said to have "exclaimed with a warmth and enthusiasm of which those who knew him best could scarcely believe him capable, 'What delicious coloring worthy of Titian himself!'" The American squirrel, it is said, disclosed the colonial origin of the picture to the Pennsylvania-born Quaker artist. A letter from Copley was subsequently delivered to him. West got the canvas into the Exhibition of the year and wrote, on August 4, 1766, a letter to Copley in which he referred to Sir Joshua Reynolds' interest in the work and advised the artist to follow his example by making "a viset to Europe for this porpase (of self-improvement) for three or four years."

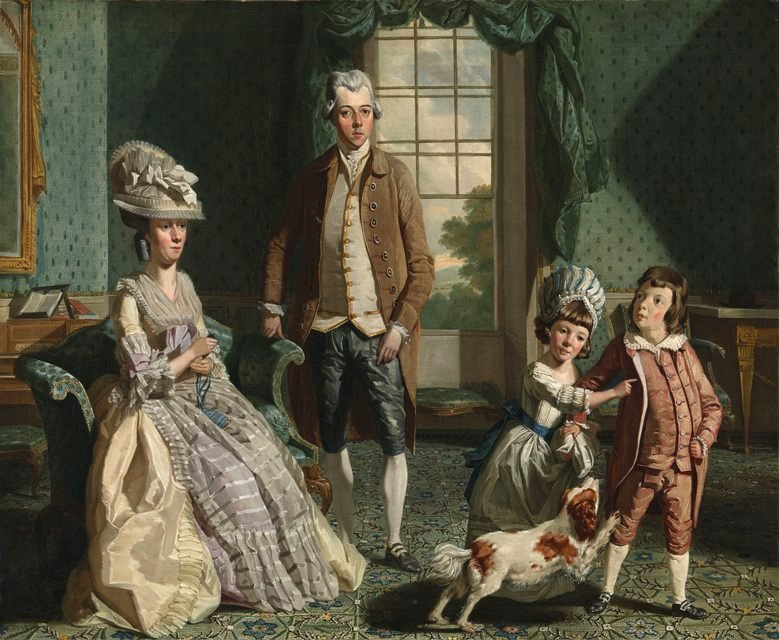
The Fountaine Family (1776)

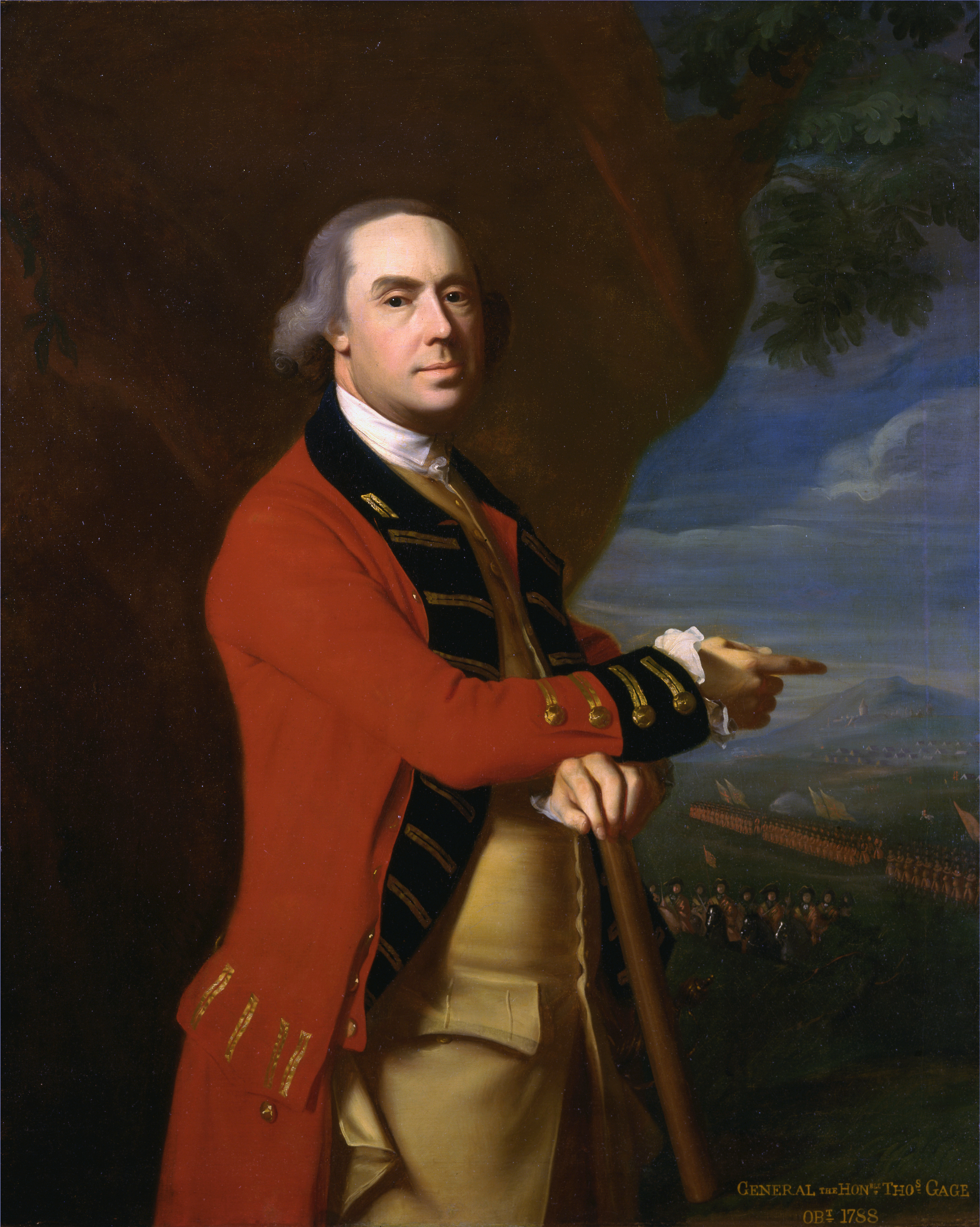
Portrait of Thomas Gage (1768)

Myles Cooper (1768)

West's subsequent letters were considerably responsible for making Copley discontented with his situation and prospects in a colonial town. Copley in his letters to West of October 13 and November 12, 1766, gleefully accepted the invitation to send other pictures to the Exhibition and mournfully referred to himself as "peculiarly unlucky in Liveing in a place into which there has not been one portrait brought that is worthy to be call'd a Picture within my memory." In a later letter to West, of June 17, 1768, he displayed a cautious person's reasons for not rashly giving up the good living which his art gave him. He wrote: "I should be glad to go to Europe, but cannot think of it without a very good prospect of doing as well there as I can here. You are sensable that 300 Guineas a Year, which is my present income, is a pretty living in America. ... And what ever my ambition may be to excel in our noble Art, I cannot think of doing it at the expence of not only my own happyness, but that of a tender Mother and a Young Brother whose dependence is intirely upon me". West replied on September 20, 1768, saying that he had talked over Copley's prospects with other artists of London "and find that by their Candid approbation you have nothing to Hazard in Comeing to this Place."

The income which Copley earned by painting in the 1760s was extraordinary for his town and time. It had promoted the son of a needy tobacconist into the local aristocracy. The foremost personages of New England came to his painting-room as sitters. He married, on November 16, 1769, Susanna Farnham Clarke, daughter of Richard and Elizabeth (Winslow) Clarke, the former being the very wealthy agent of the East India Company in Boston; the latter, a New England woman of Mayflower ancestry. The union was a happy one, and socially notable. Mrs. Copley was a beautiful woman of poise and serenity whose features are familiar through several of her husband's paintings. Copley had already bought land on the west side of Beacon Hill extending down to the Charles River. The newly married Copleys, who would have six children, moved into "a solitary house in Boston, on Beacon Hill, chosen with his keen perception of picturesque beauty". There, the Copleys lived with several enslaved servants. Their house was approximately on the site of the Appleton–Parker House on Beacon Street. Here were painted the portraits of dignitaries of state and church, graceful women and charming children, in the mode of faithful and painstaking verisimilitude which Copley had made his own. The family's style of living at this period was that of people of wealth. John Trumbull told Dunlap that in 1771, being then a student at Harvard College, he called on Copley, who "was dressed on the occasion in a suit of crimson velvet with gold buttons, and the elegance displayed by Copley in his style of living, added to his high repute as an artist, made a permanent impression on Trumbull in favor of the life of a painter." Though not much is known about his specific work process and professional minutiae, his studios in Boston became sites for high-class subjects to meet and discuss personal affairs and the execution of their depictions. He seemed to have disdain for artisan workers such as carpenters or cobblers and charged high fees for his commissions, to solidify his place in the Bostonian elite.

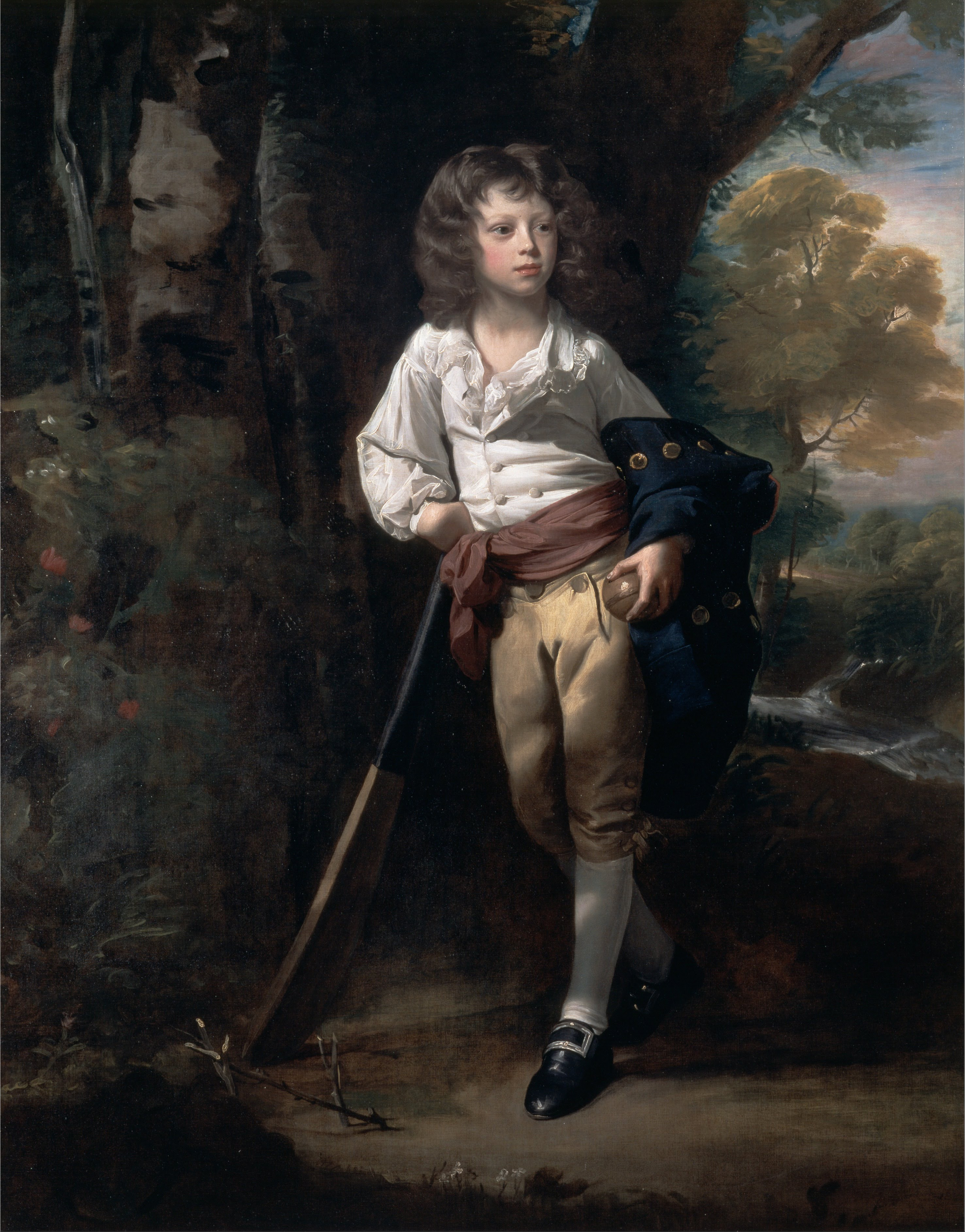
Portrait of Richard Heber aged nine, a future bibliophile and MP (1782)

In town and church affairs Copley took almost no part. He referred to himself as "desireous of avoideing every imputation of party spirit. Political contests being neighther pleasing to an artist or advantageous to the Art itself." His name appeared on January 29, 1771, on a petition of freeholders and inhabitants to have the powder house removed from the town whose existence it imperiled. Records of the Church in Brattle Square disclose that in 1772, Copley was asked to submit plans for a rebuilt meeting-house, and that he proposed an ambitious plan and elevation "which was much admired for its Elegance and Grandeur," but which on account of probable expensiveness was not accepted by the society. Copley's sympathy with the politicians who were working toward American independence appears to have been genuine but not so vigorous as to lead him to participate in any of their plans.

It was known to earlier biographers that Copley at one time painted portraits in New York City. The circumstances of this visit, which was supplemented by a few days in Philadelphia, were first disclosed through Prof. Guernsey Jones's discovery of many previously unpublished Copley and Pelham documents in the Public Record Office, London. From these letters and papers, published by the Massachusetts Historical Society in 1914, it appears that in 1768 Copley painted in Boston a portrait of Myles Cooper, president of King's College, who then urged his visiting New York. Accepting the invitation later, Copley, between June 1771 and January 1772, painted thirty-seven portraits in New York, setting up his easel "in Broadway, on the west side, in a house which was burned in the great conflagration on the night the British army entered the city as enemies." Copley's letters to Henry Pelham, whom he left in charge of his affairs in Boston, describe minutely the journey across New England, his first impressions of New York, which "has more Grand Buildings than Boston, the streets much cleaner and some much broader," and the successful search for suitable lodgings and a painting-room; thereafter they give detailed accounts of sitters and social happenings. The correspondence also contains Copley's careful instructions to Pelham concerning the features of a new house then being built on his Beacon Hill "farm," giving elevations and specifications of the addition of "peazas" which the artist saw for the first time in New York. Copley at the time had a lawsuit respecting title to some of his lands. His letters reveal a man who allowed such disputes to worry him considerably.

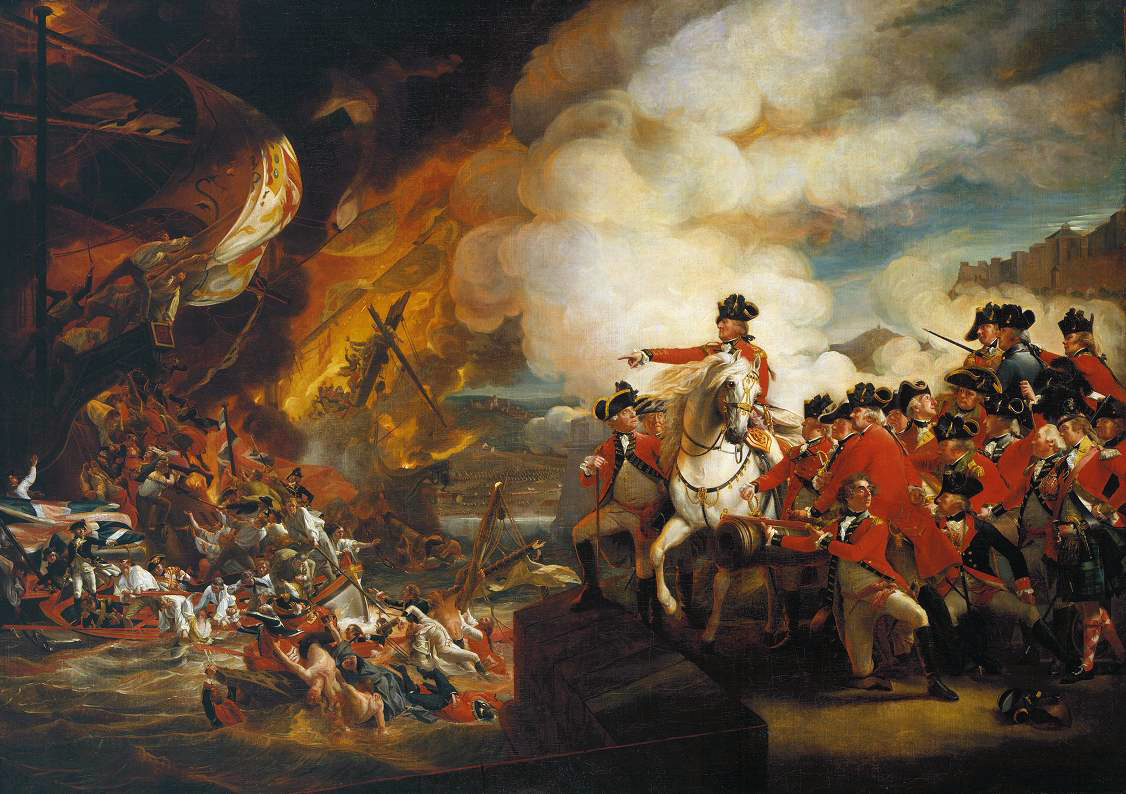
The Defeat of the Floating Batteries at Gibraltar, September 1782 (c. 1783) is one of Britain's largest oil paintings; it depicts the defeat of the floating batteries at Gibraltar during the Great Siege of Gibraltar. The Governor of Gibraltar, General George Augustus Eliott, is on horseback pointing to the rescue of the defeated Spanish sailors by the British.

In September 1771, Mr. and Mrs. Copley visited Philadelphia, where, at the home of Chief Justice William Allen, they "saw a fine Coppy of the Titian Venus and Holy Family at whole length as large as life from Coregio". On their return journey they viewed at New Brunswick, New Jersey several pictures attributed to van Dyck. "The date is 1628 on one of them," wrote Copley; "it is without dout I think Vandyck did them before he came to England." Back in New York Copley wrote, on October 17, requesting that a certain black dress of Mrs. Copley's be sent over at once. "As we are much in company," he said, "we think it necessary Sukey [his wife] should have it, as her other Cloaths are mostly improper for her to wear". On December 15 Copley informed Pelham that "this Week finishes all my Business, no less than 37 Busts; so the weather permitting by Christmas we hope to be on the road." Thus ended Copley's only American tour away from Boston. Accounts of his having painted in the South are without foundation. Most of the Southern portraits that have been popularly attributed to him were made by Henry Benbridge.

His correspondents in England continued to urge Copley to undertake European studies. He saved an undated and unsigned letter from some one who wrote: "Our people here are enrapture'd with him, he is compared to Vandyck, Reubens and all the great painters of Old." His brother-in-law Jonathan Clarke, already in London, advised his "comeing this way." West wrote, on January 6, 1773: "My Advice is, Mrs. Copley to remain in Boston till you have made this Tour [to Italy], After which, if you fix your place of reasidanc in London, Mrs. Copley to come over."

Political and economic conditions in Boston were increasingly turbulent. Copley's father-in-law, Mr. Clarke, was the merchant to whom was consigned the tea that provoked the Boston Tea Party. Copley's family connections were all Loyalists. He defended his wife's relatives at a meeting described in his letter of December 1, 1773. He wrote on April 26, 1774, of an unpleasant experience when a mob visited his house demanding the person of Col. George Watson, a Loyalist mandamus counselor who had gone elsewhere. The patriots having threatened to have his blood if he "entertained any such Villain for the future," Copley exclaimed: "What a spirit! What if Mr. Watson had stayed (as I pressed him to) to spend the night. I must either have given up a friend to the insult of a Mob or had my house pulled down and perhaps my family murthered."

=== Move to London and the European tour ===
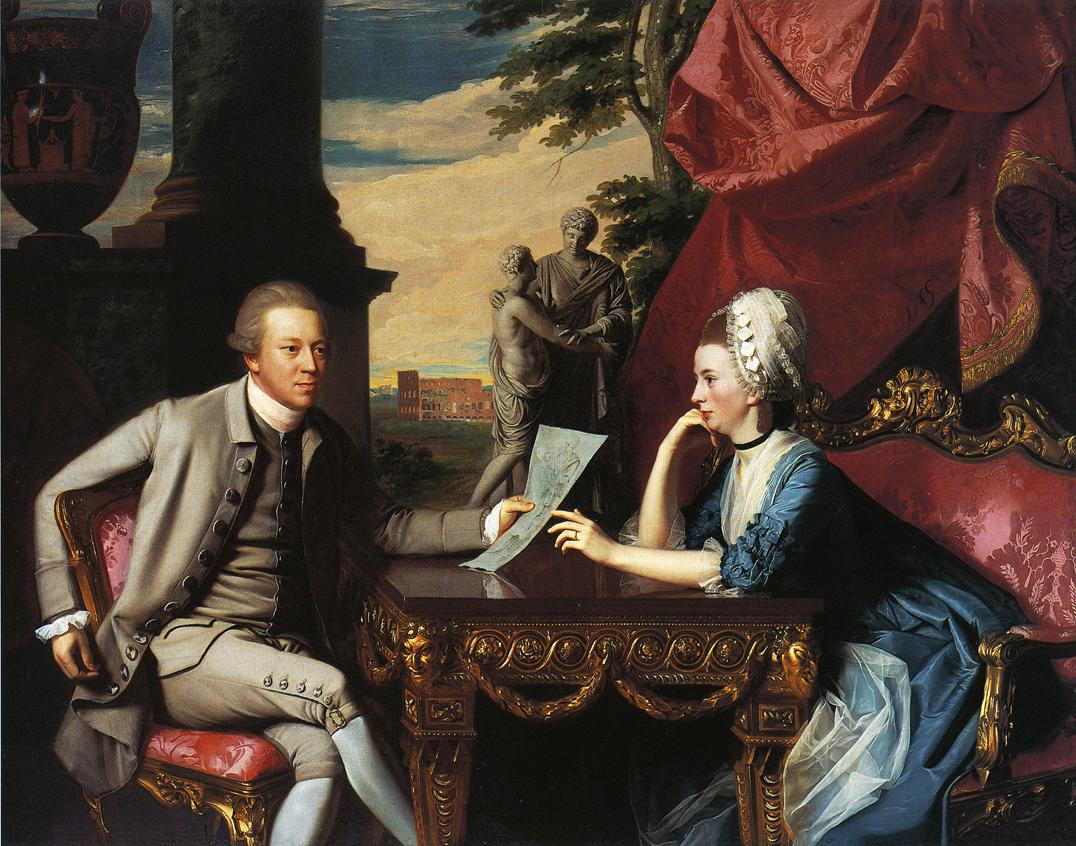
Mr. and Mrs. Ralph Izard, Americans in Rome (1775)

With many letters of introduction, all of which are published in the Copley-Pelham correspondence, Copley sailed from Boston in June 1774, leaving his mother, wife, and children in Henry Pelham's charge. He wrote on July 11 from London "after a most easy and safe passage." An early call was upon West, to "find in him those amiable qualitys that makes his friendship boath desireable as an artist and as a Gentleman." "In England, what [Benjamin] West and Copley did together was to create a new kind of history painting, one with modern, topical subjects, chiefly death scenes of heroes, in a historic manner, but with scrupulous attention to contemporary detail" (Johnson 441). The American was duly introduced to Sir Joshua Reynolds and was taken to "the Royal Accademy where the Students had a naked model from which they were Drawing". In London Copley took no sitters at this time though urged to do so. Shortly before leaving for Italy he "dined with Gov'r Hutchinson, and I think there was 12 of us altogether, and all Bostonians, and we had Choice Salt Fish for Dinner."

On September 2, 1774, Copley chronicled his arrival at Paris (the beginning of a nine-month European tour), where he saw and painstakingly described many paintings and sculptures. His journey toward Rome was made in company of an artist named George Carter, described as "a captious, cross-grained and self conceited person who kept a regular journal of his tour in which he set down the smallest trifle that could bear a construction unfavorable to the American's character." Carter was undoubtedly an uncongenial companion. Copley, however, may at times have been both depressing and bumptious. He found fault, according to Carter, with the French firewood because it gave out less heat than American wood, and he bragged of the art which America would produce when "they shall have an independent government." Copley's personal appearance was thus described by his uncharitable comrade: "Very thin, a little pock-marked [presumably a souvenir of the Boston smallpox epidemic described by Copley in a letter of January 24, 1764], prominent eyebrows, small eyes, which after fatigue seemed a day's march in his head." Copley afterward wrote of Carter: "He was a sort of snail which crawled over a man in his sleep and left its slime, and no more." Mrs. Amory relates that "both parties were undoubtedly glad to separate on their arrival at their destination." October 8, 1774, found Copley at Genoa, where he wrote to his wife describing, among other things, the inexpensiveness of the silks: "The velvet and satin for which I gave seven guineas would have cost fourteen in London." He reached Rome on October 26. "I am very fortunate," he wrote, "in my time of being here, as I shall see the magnificence of the rejoicing on the election of the Pope; it is also the year of jubilee, or Holy Year."

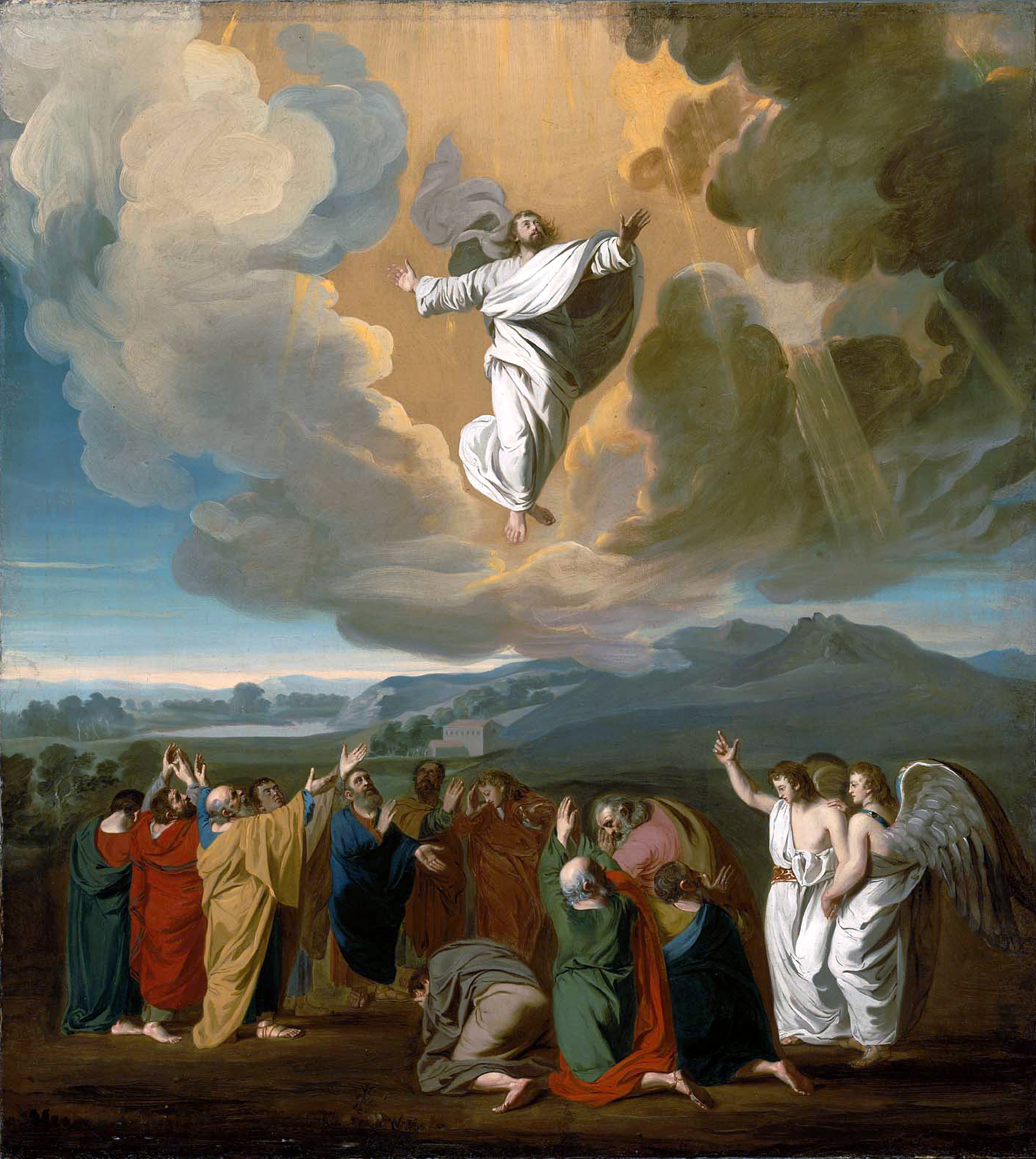
The Ascension (1775)

Copley's plan of study and mode of living at Rome are described in several letters. He found time for excursions. He visited Naples in January 1775, writing to his wife: "The city is very large and delightfully situated but you have no idea of the dirt … and the people are as dirty as the streets—indeed, they are offensive to such a degree as to make me ill". The excavations at Pompeii greatly interested him and in company with Ralph Izard of South Carolina (whose family portrait he later painted) he extended his journey to Paestum. At Rome early in 1775 he copied Correggio's St. Jerome on commission from Lord Grosvenor, and other works for Mr. and Mrs. Izard. About May 20 he started on a tour northward through Florence, Parma, Mantua, Venice, Trieste, Stuttgart, Mainz, Cologne, and the Low Countries. From Parma he wrote to Henry Pelham urging that the whole family leave America at once since, "if the Frost should be severe and the Harbour frozen, the Town of Boston will be exposed to an attack; and if it should be taken all that have remained in the town will be considered as enimys to the Country and ill treated or exposed to great distress." This anxiety was groundless, for Mrs. Copley and the children had already sailed on May 27, 1775, from Marblehead in a ship crowded with refugees. She arrived in London some weeks before Copley returned from the Continent, making her home with her brother-in-law, Henry Bromfield. Her father, Richard Clarke, and her brothers came soon after. Copley happily rejoined his family and set up his easel, at first in Leicester Fields and later at 25 George St., Hanover Square, in a house built by a wealthy Italian and admirably adapted to an artist's requirements. Here Mr. and Mrs. Copley and their son Lord Lyndhurst lived and died.

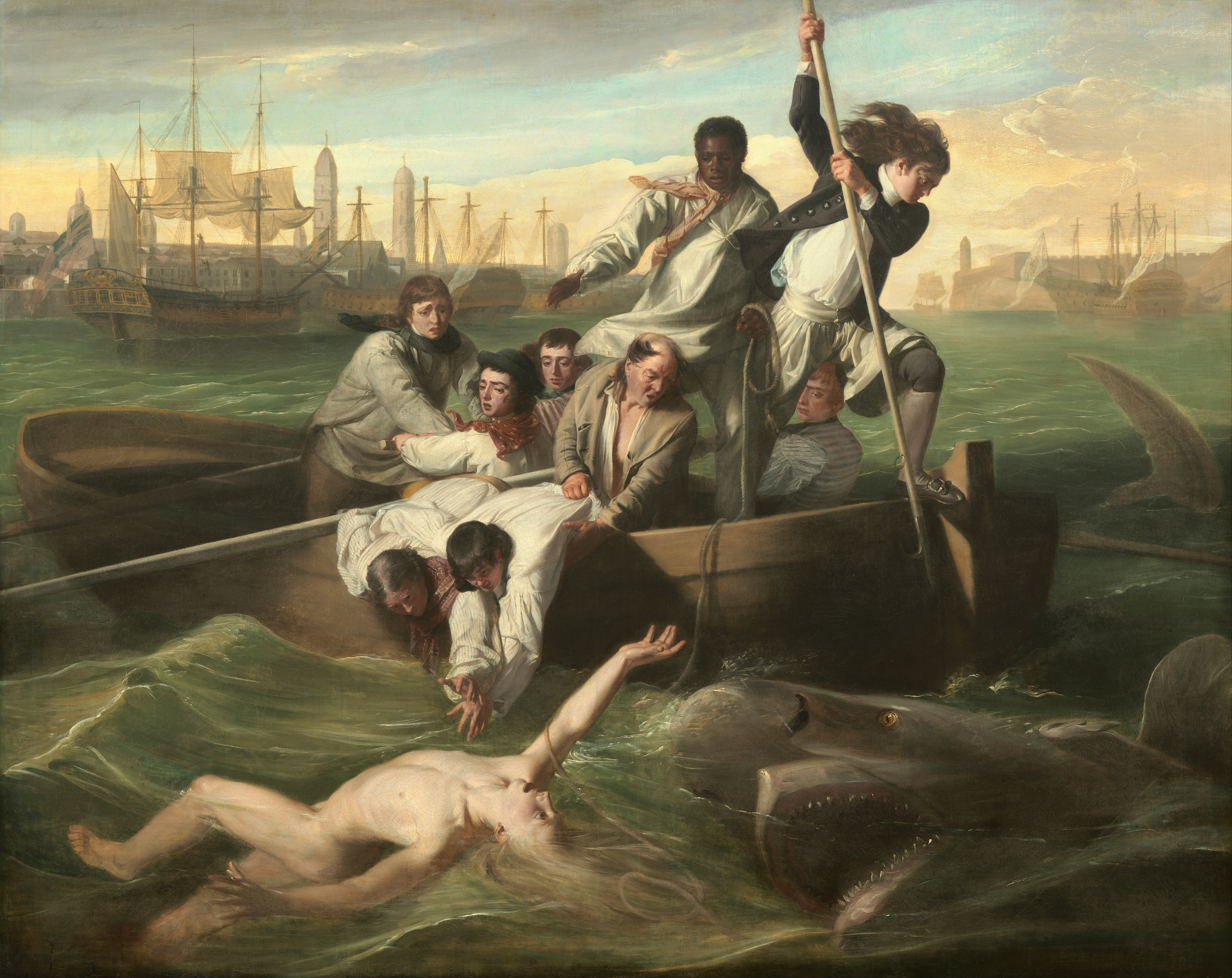
Watson and the Shark (1778) depicts the rescue of Brook Watson from a shark attack in Havana, Cuba.

As an English painter Copley began in 1775 a career promising at the outset and destined from personal and political causes to end in gloom and adversity. His technique was so well established, his habits of industry so well confirmed, and the reputation that had preceded him from America was so extraordinary, that he could hardly fail to make a place for himself among British artists. He himself, however, "often said, after his arrival in England, that he could not surpass some of his early works". The deterioration of his talent was gradual, however, so some of the "English Copleys" are superb paintings.

Following a fashion set by West and others, Copley began to paint historical pieces as well as portraits. His first foray into this genre was Watson and the Shark, its subject based on an incident related to the artist by Brook Watson, who had been attacked by a shark while swimming in Havana harbour as a 14-year-old boy. It is likely that Watson, who went on to a successful career despite the attack and the loss of his leg below the knee, commissioned the painting as a lesson for other unfortunates, including orphans like himself, in the fact that even the severest adversity can be overcome. Engravings from this work achieved an enduring popularity.

For a place over the fireplace of the George St. dining room was painted the great family picture now at Boston, which, when first publicly shown by Lord Lyndhurst at the Manchester exhibition, 1862, was "pronounced by competent critics to be equal to any, in the same style, by Vandyck". But the artist's fame as a historical painter was made by The Death of the Earl of Chatham showing the collapse in the House of Lords of the former Prime Minister William Pitt, 1st Earl of Chatham. The painting, however, brought him denunciation from Sir William Chambers, who objected to its being exhibited privately in advance of the Royal Academy's exhibition. In an open letter Chambers accused Copley of purveying his picture like a "raree-show" and of aiming for "either the sale of prints or the raffle of the picture." To this censure, obviously unfair to one newly arrived in London and uninformed as to the professional ethics of exhibiting, Copley one morning wrote a caustic reply, and in the evening wisely threw it into the fire. Engravings from the Chatham picture later sold well in England and America.

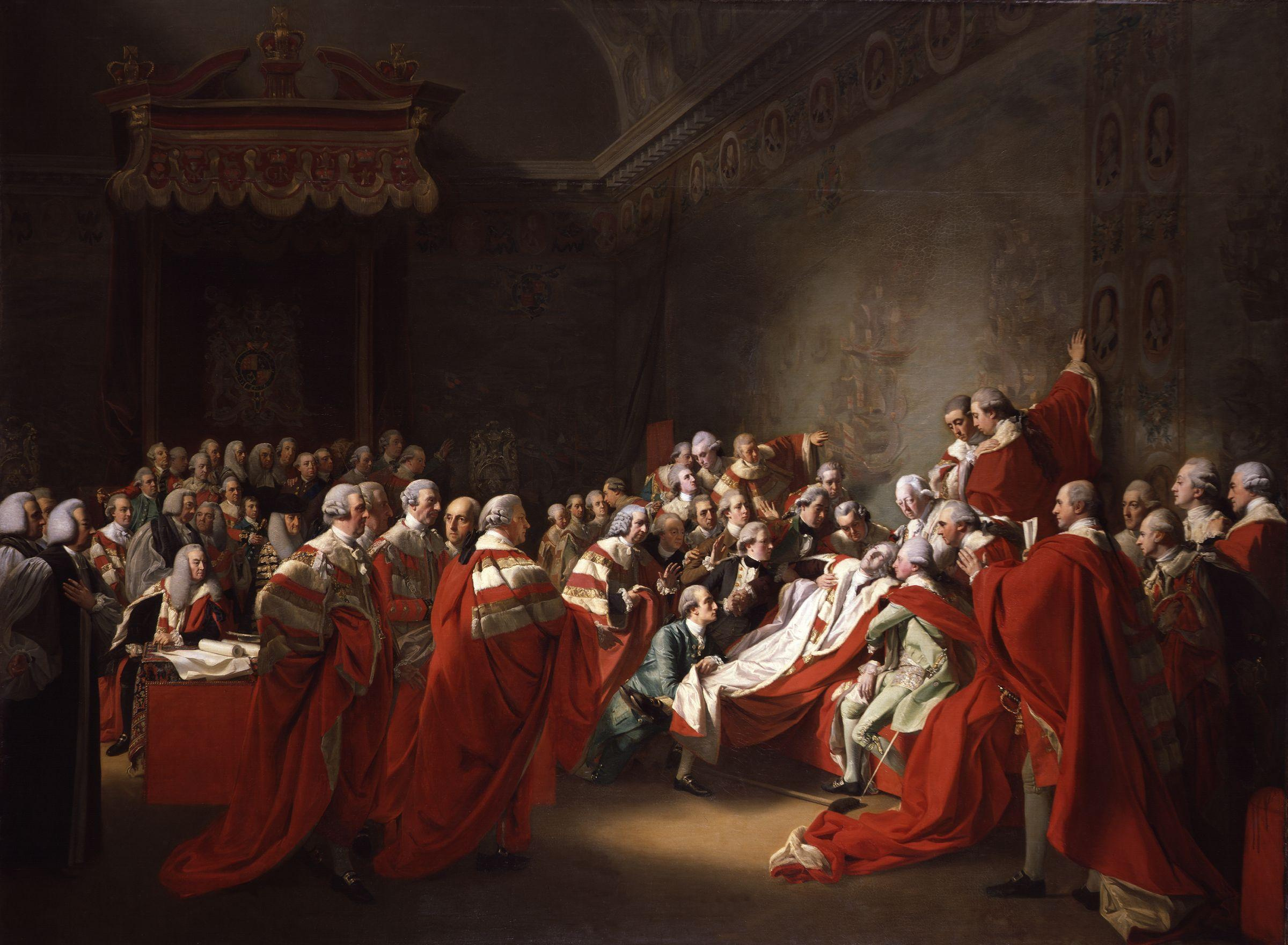
The Death of the Earl of Chatham (1779–81), a key work in establishing Copley's reputation as a history painter.

Copley's adventures in historical painting were the more successful because of his painstaking efforts to obtain good likenesses of personages and correct accessories of their periods. He traveled much in England to make studies of old portraits and actual localities. At intervals came from his studio such pieces as The Red Cross Knight, Abraham Offering up Isaac, Hagar and Ishmael in the Wilderness, The Death of Major Peirson, The Arrest of Five Members of the Commons by Charles the First, The Siege of Gibraltar, The Surrender of Admiral DeWindt to Lord Camperdown, The Offer of the Crown to Lady Jane Grey by the Dukes of Northumberland and Suffolk, The Resurrection, and others. He continued to paint portraits, among them those of several members of the royal family and numerous British and American celebrities. Between 1776 and 1815 he sent forty-three paintings to exhibitions of the Royal Academy, of which he was elected an associate member in the former year. His election to full membership occurred in 1783.

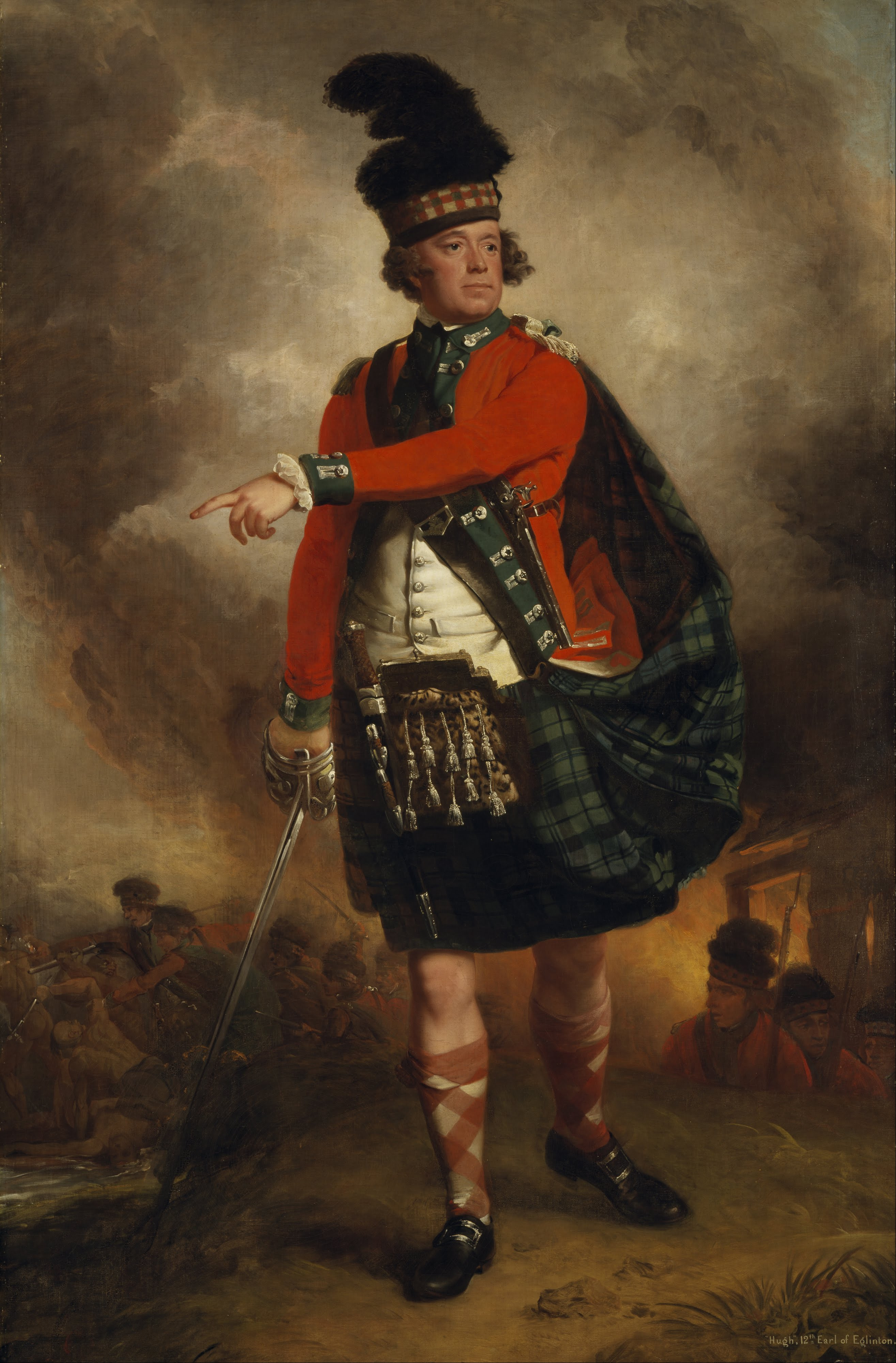
Portrait of Hugh Montgomerie (1780)

The effort with which Copley labored over his compositions was exemplary, but at times it may have injured his health and disposition. "He has been represented to me by some," wrote Cunningham, "as a peevish and peremptory man while others describe him as mild and unassuming." Both descriptions probably fitted Copley depending on his mood: he might be nervous from overwork and worry or in a normal condition. His granddaughter, Mrs. Amory, recalls that he usually painted continuously from early morning until twilight. In the evening his wife or a daughter read English literature for his benefit. He took but little exercise–probably not enough for health.

He would have liked to return to America but his professional routine prevented this. He was politically more liberal than were his relatives. He painted the Stars and Stripes over a ship in the background of Elkanah Watson's portrait on December 5, 1782, after listening to George III's speech formally acknowledging American independence. "He invited me into the studio," wrote Watson in his Journal, "and there, with a bold hand, a master's touch, and I believe an American heart, attached to the ship the Stars and Stripes; this was, I imagine, the first American flag hoisted in Old England." Copley's contacts with New England people continued to be many. He painted portraits of John Adams, John Quincy Adams, and other Bostonians who visited England. He was elected a Foreign Honorary Member of the American Academy of Arts and Sciences in 1791. His daughter Elizabeth was married in August 1800 to Gardiner Greene of Boston, a wealthy gentleman whose descendants preserved much of the correspondence of the Copley family.

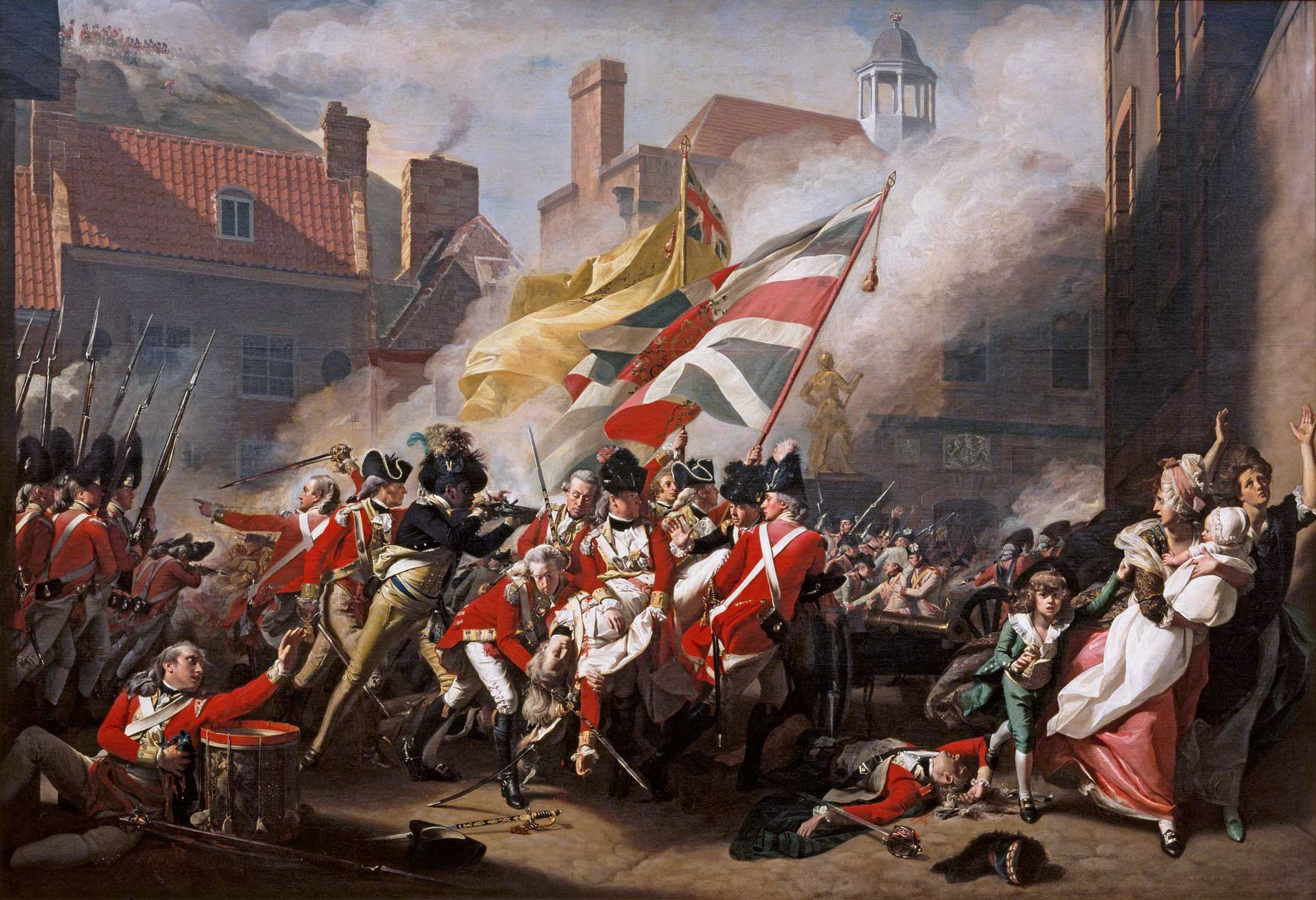
The Death of Major Peirson, in the 1781 Battle of Jersey (1783)

Prior to this marriage of his daughter, Copley had sold his Beacon Hill estate to a syndicate of speculators headed by Dr. Benjamin Joy. He felt himself victimized when he learned that the purchasers knew of a project of building the Massachusetts State House at the top of the hill, and he sent his son John Singleton Copley, Jr., then at the beginning of his brilliant legal career, to Boston in 1796 seeking to annul the arrangement. The letters which the future Lord Chancellor wrote during his visit to the United States are interesting reading but his quest was unsuccessful. "I do not believe," he wrote to his father, "that any person could have obtained from them one shilling more." Despite this report the artist made further efforts to recover his "farm". The subject of his grievance frequently recurs in the family correspondence, but it is not certain that Copley had any reason to feel himself defrauded. A memorandum prepared for him by Gardiner Greene stated that long after the land "had passed out of Copley's possession it, or a part of it, was offered at no higher price than was paid to his son." Allen Chamberlain, whose Beacon Hill gives a detailed summary of the complicated negotiations surrounding this purchase, holds that Copley was fairly compensated at a price three times what he had paid for property from which he had had rents of considerable amount.

=== Decline ===
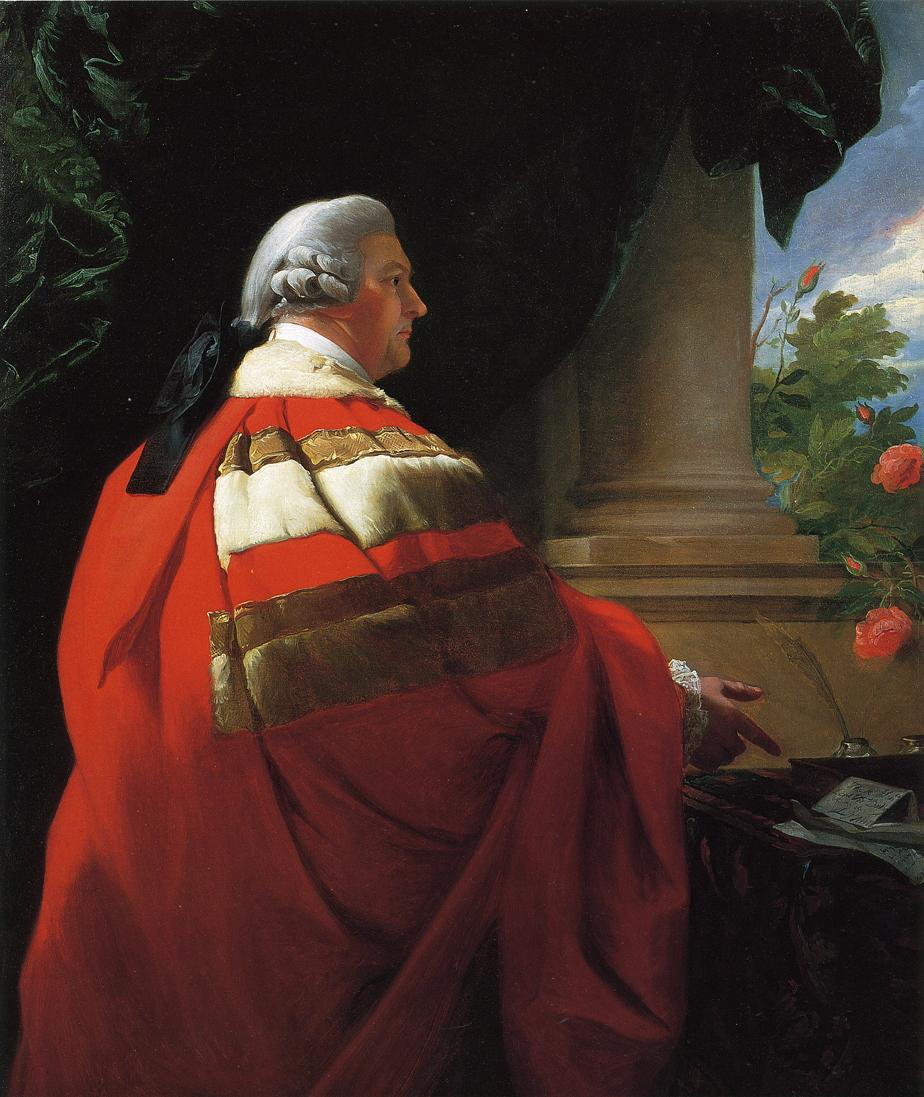
John, Second Viscount Dudley and Ward (before 1788)

In his last fifteen years, though painting persistently, Copley experienced much depression and disappointment. The Napoleonic Wars brought hard times. The household at 25 George St. was expensive to maintain. The education of a talented son was costly. It grieved the father that after the young barrister began to earn his way it became necessary to accept his help in supporting the home. Lord Campbell quotes the jurist as saying that "his father, having lived rather expensively, accumulated little for him." Mrs. Amory makes out a case for Mrs. Copley's admirable management, but it appears that a standard of living difficult to maintain in the changed circumstances made much borrowing inevitable. Copley was chagrined by the failure of his Equestrian Portrait of the Prince Regent to "bring a financial return." Cunningham says, "No customer made his appearance for Charles and the impeached members." Other canvases involving years of labor were unsold. Troubles with engravers were many, whether the fault was theirs or the painter's. Copley's letters to his son-in-law in Boston usually concerned loans made to him and frequently extended.

The aging artist's physical and mental health produced anxiety. In 1810 he had a bad fall which kept him from painting for a month. He incessantly bewailed the loss of his Boston property. Mrs. Copley wrote on December 11, 1810: "Your father has been led to feel this affair [his unsuccessful litigation to recover the "farm"] more sensibly from the present state of things in this country where every difficulty of living is increasing and the advantages arising from his profession are decreasing". In October 1811, Copley wrote to Greene in distress, craving an additional loan of £600. And on March 4, 1812, he wrote: "I am still pursuing my profession in the hope that, at a future time, a proper amount will be realized from my works, either to myself or family, but at this moment all pursuits which are not among the essentials of life are at a stand". In August 1813, Mrs. Copley wrote that, although her husband was still painting, "he cannot apply himself as closely as he used to do." She reported in April 1814: "Your father enjoys his health but grows rather feeble, dislikes more and more to walk; but it is still pleasant for him to go on with his painting." Amongst his last completed works were The Battle of the Pyrenees, depicting the Duke of Wellington during a notable British victory during the Peninsular War and The Siege of Dunkirk.

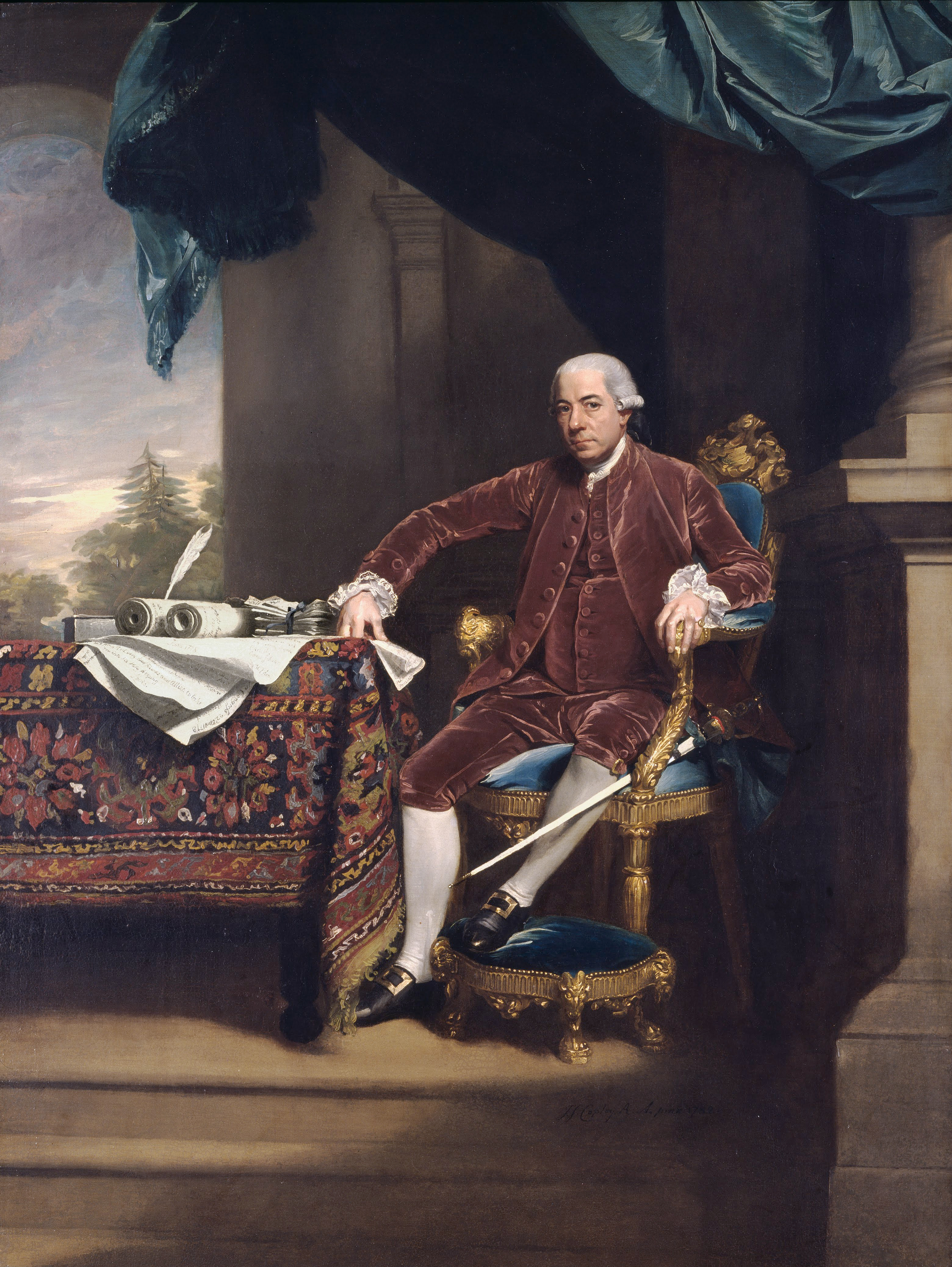
Portrait of Henry Laurens (1782) (National Portrait Gallery, Washington)

In June 1815, the Copleys entertained as visitor John Quincy Adams, with whom they jubilantly discussed the new terms of peace between the United States and the United Kingdom. In the letter describing this visit the painter's infirmities are said to have been increased by "his cares and disappointments." A note of August 18, 1815, informed the Greenes that Copley while at dinner had had a paralytic stroke. He seemed at first to recover. Late in August his prognosis was favorable to his painting again. A second shock occurred, however, and he died on September 9, 1815. "He was perfectly resigned," wrote his daughter Mary, "and willing to die, and expressed his firm trust in God, through the merits of our Redeemer." He was buried in Croydon Minster in Croydon, Surrey.

How deep into debt Copley had fallen in his latest years was hinted at in Mrs. Copley's letter of February 1, 1816, to Gardiner Greene in which she gave details of his assets and borrowings and predicted: "When the whole property is disposed of and applied toward the discharge of the debts a large deficiency must, it is feared, remain."

The estate was settled by Copley's son, later Lord Lyndhurst, who maintained the establishment in George St., supported his mother down to her death in 1836, and kept the ownership of many of the artist's unsold pictures until March 5, 1864, when they were sold at auction in London. Several of the works then dispersed are now in American collections.

== Legacy ==
According to art historian Paul Staiti, Copley was the greatest and most influential painter in colonial America, producing about 350 works of art. With his startling likenesses of persons and things, he came to define a realist art tradition in America. His visual legacy extended throughout the nineteenth century in the American taste for the work of artists as diverse as Fitz Henry Lane and William Harnett. In Britain, while he continued to paint portraits for the elite, his great achievement was the development of contemporary history painting, which was a combination of reportage, idealism, and theatre. He was also one of the pioneers of the private exhibition, orchestrating shows and marketing prints of his own work to mass audiences that might otherwise attend exhibitions only at the Royal Academy, or who previously had not gone to exhibitions at all.

Boston's Copley Square, Copley Square Hotel and Copley Plaza bear his name, as do Copley Township, Ohio, and Copley crater on Mercury. A 5-cent stamp commemorating John Singleton Copley was issued by the United States Post Office Department in 1965—the 150th anniversary of his death—featuring his daughter, Elizabeth Clark Copley, in his painting Portrait of the Copley family (1776).

== Gallery ==
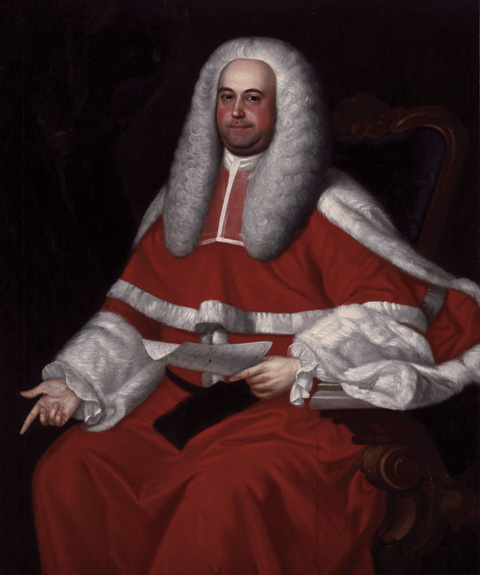
Chief Justice Jonathan Belcher (1754)

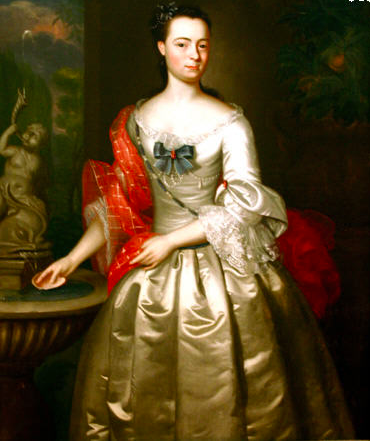
Mrs. Jonathan Belcher (Abigail Allen) (1756)

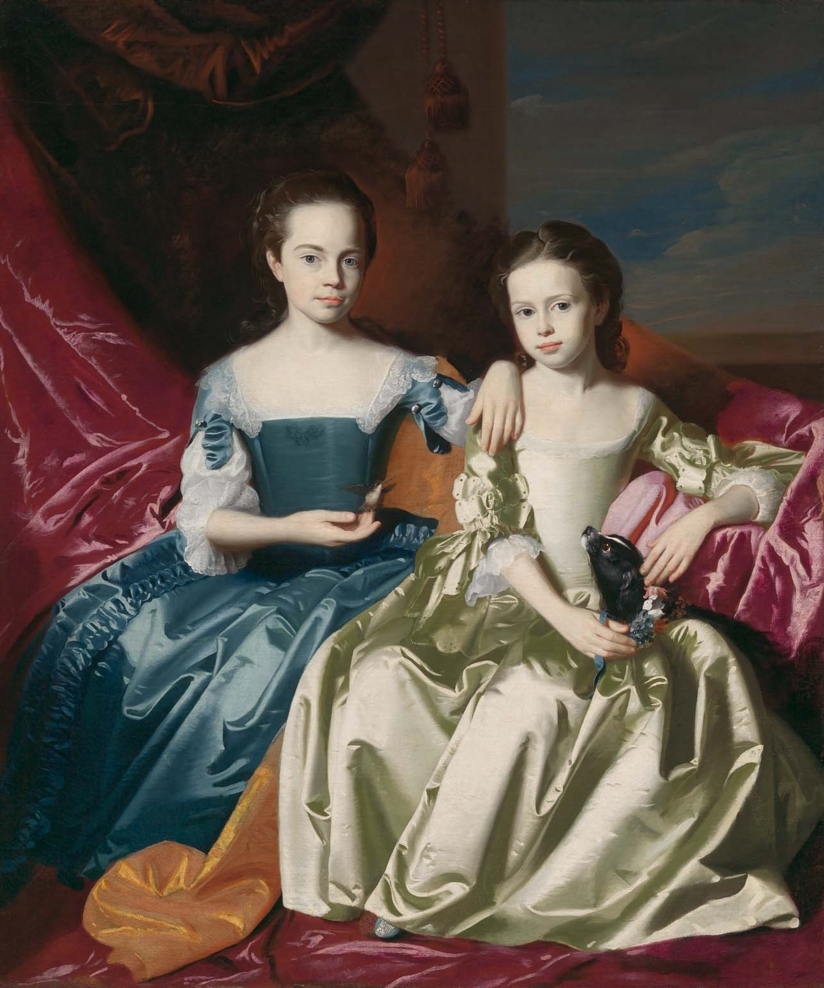
Mary and Elizabeth Royall (1758)

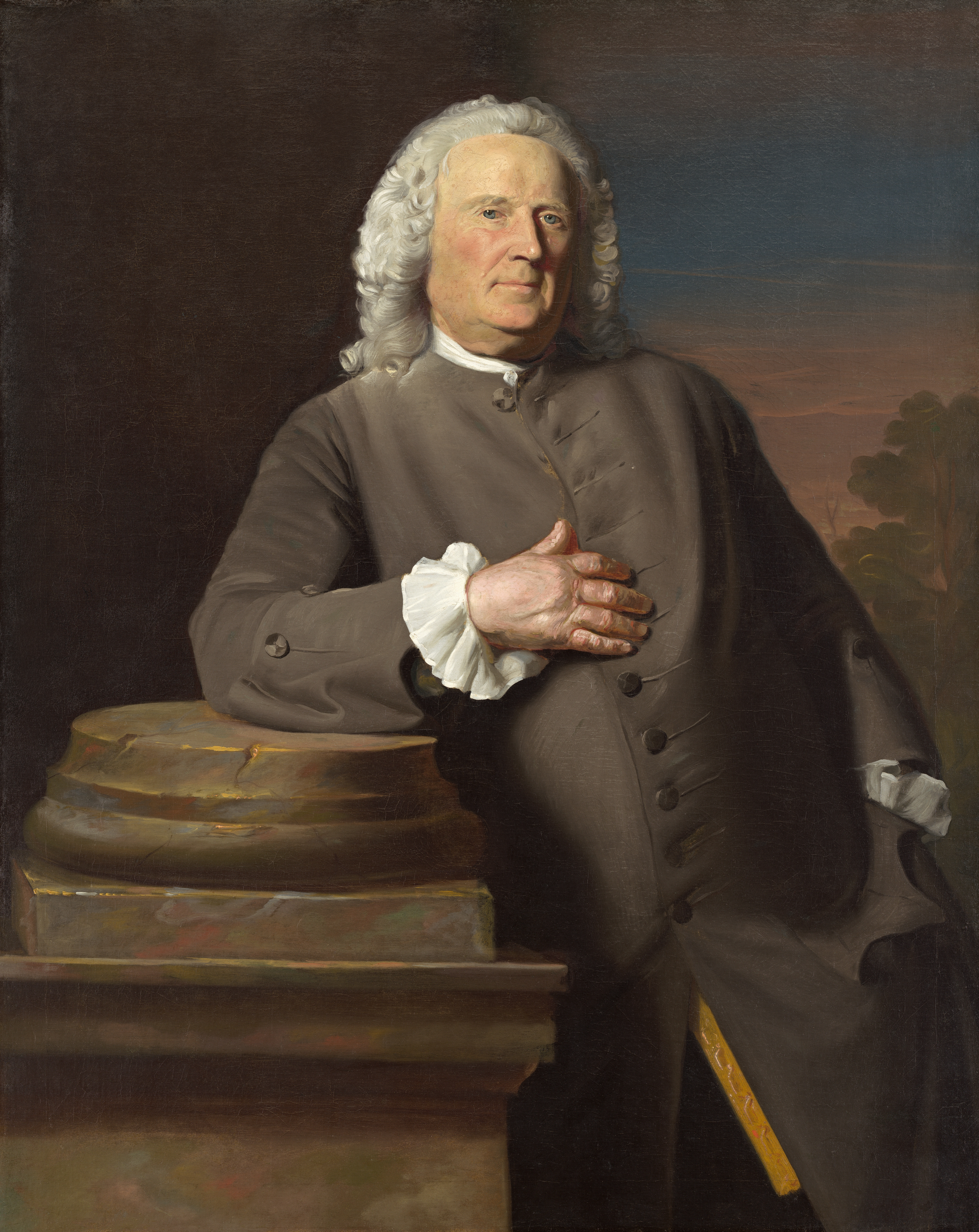
Epes Sargent (1760)

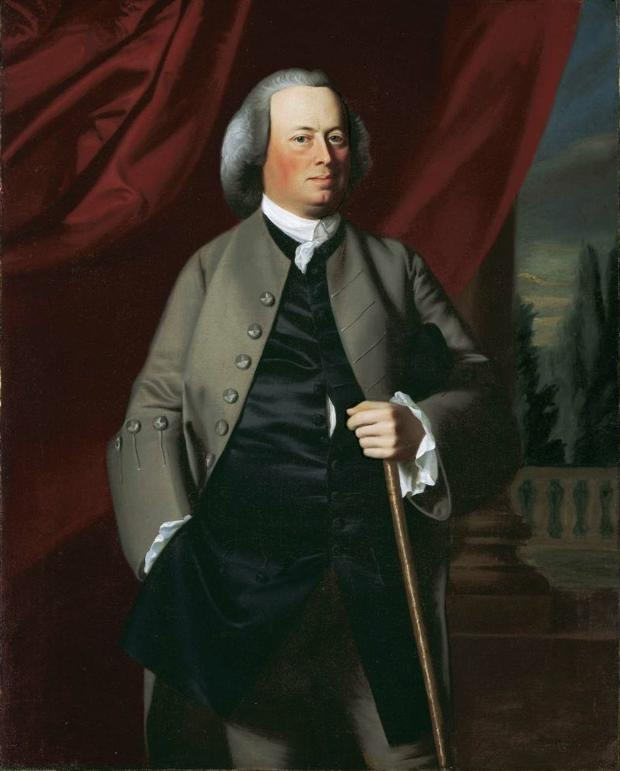
James Warren (1763)

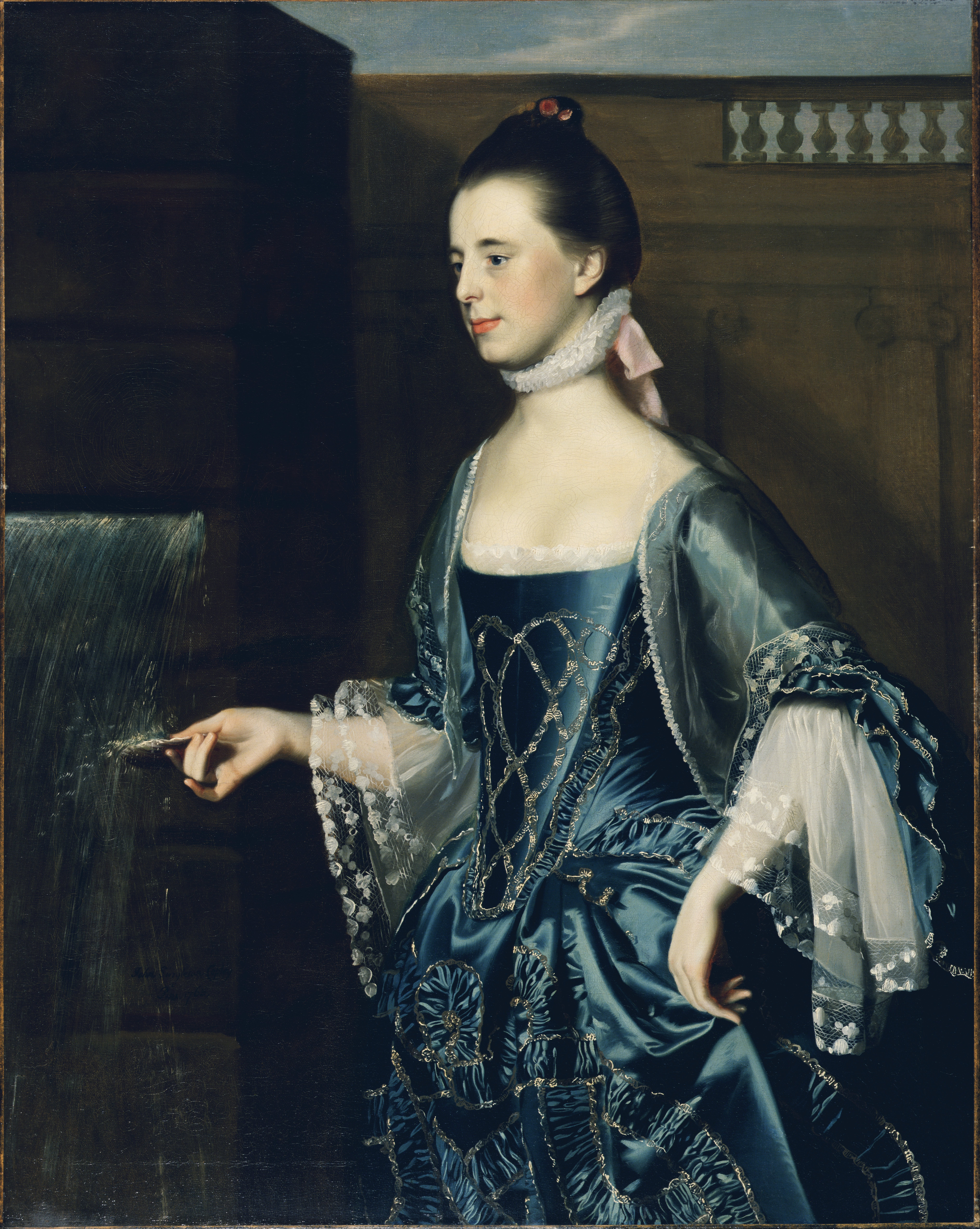
Mrs. Daniel Sargent (Mary Turner) (1763)

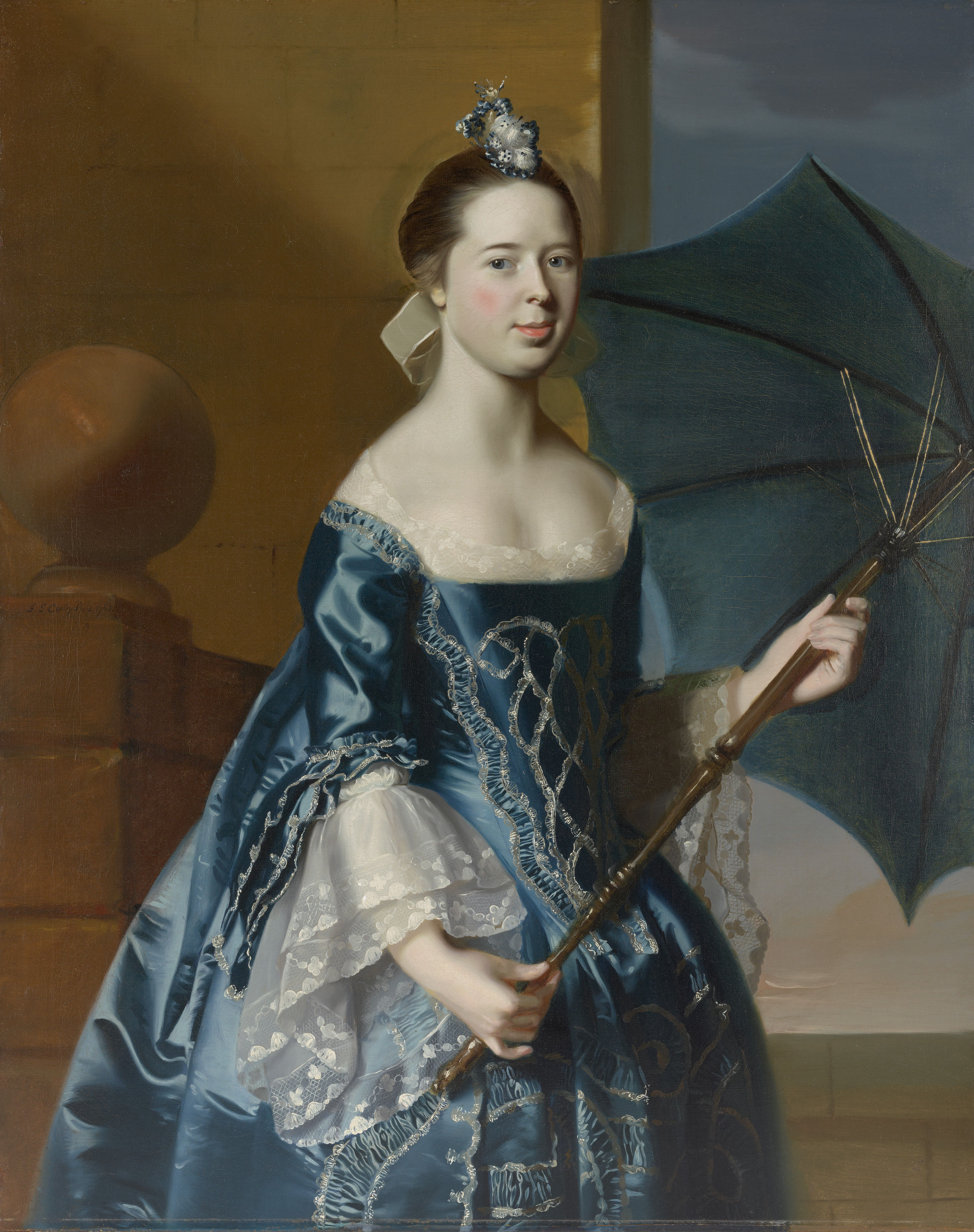
Mrs. Benjamin Pickman (Mary Toppan) (1763)

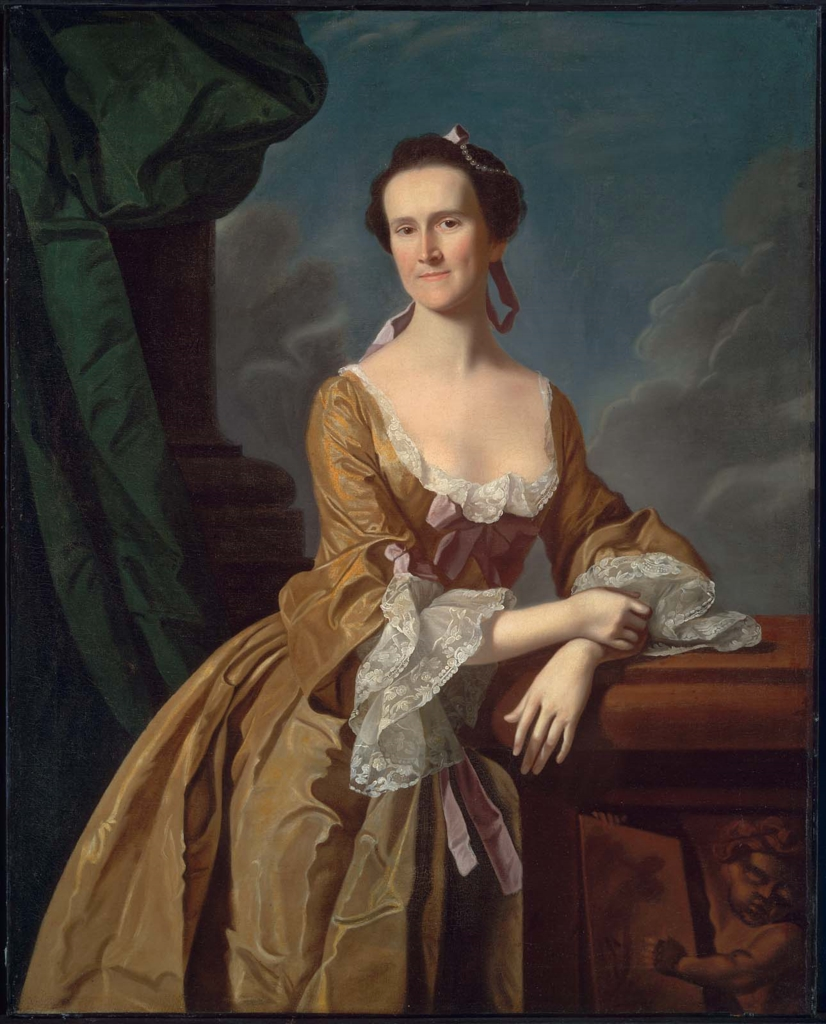
Mrs. John Amory (circa 1763)

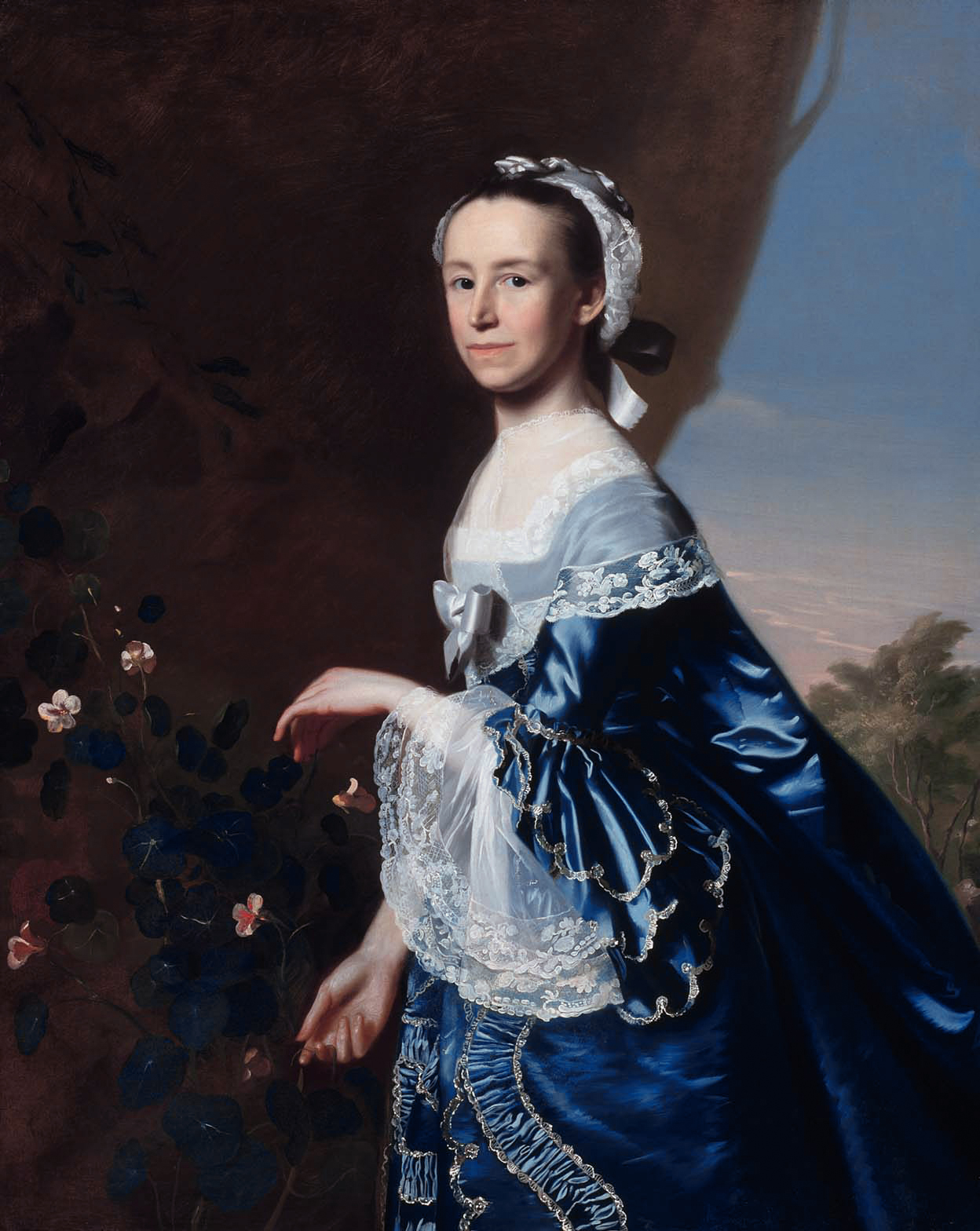
Mrs. James Warren (circa 1763)

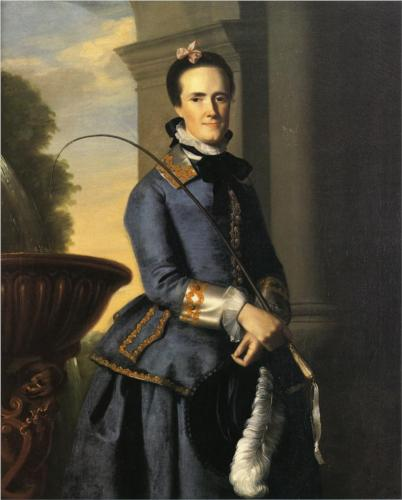
Mrs. Epes Sargent (1764)

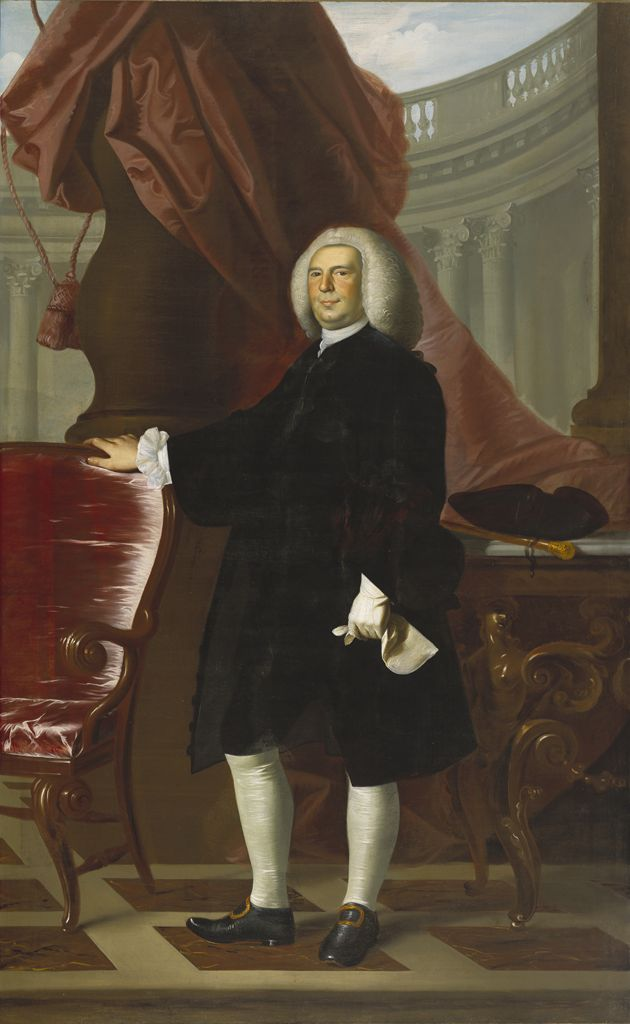
Thomas Hancock (1764–1766)

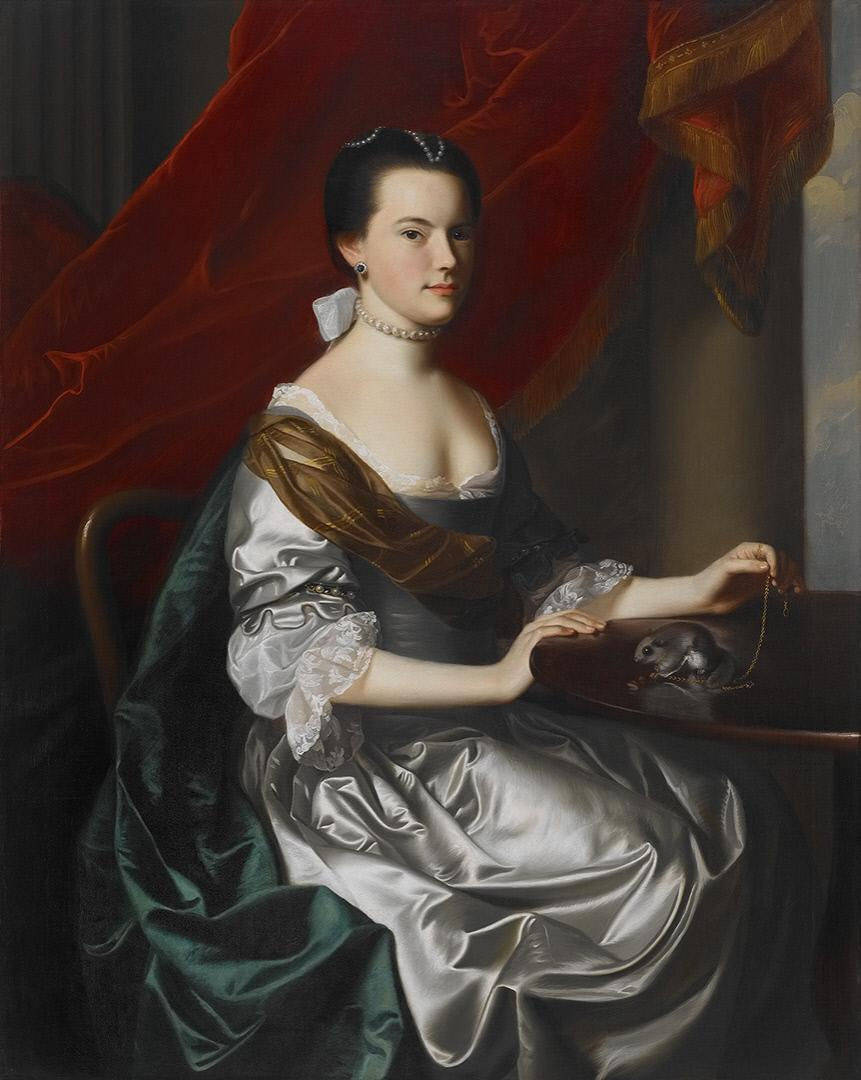
Mrs. Theodore Atkinson, Jr. (Frances Deering Wentworth) (1765)

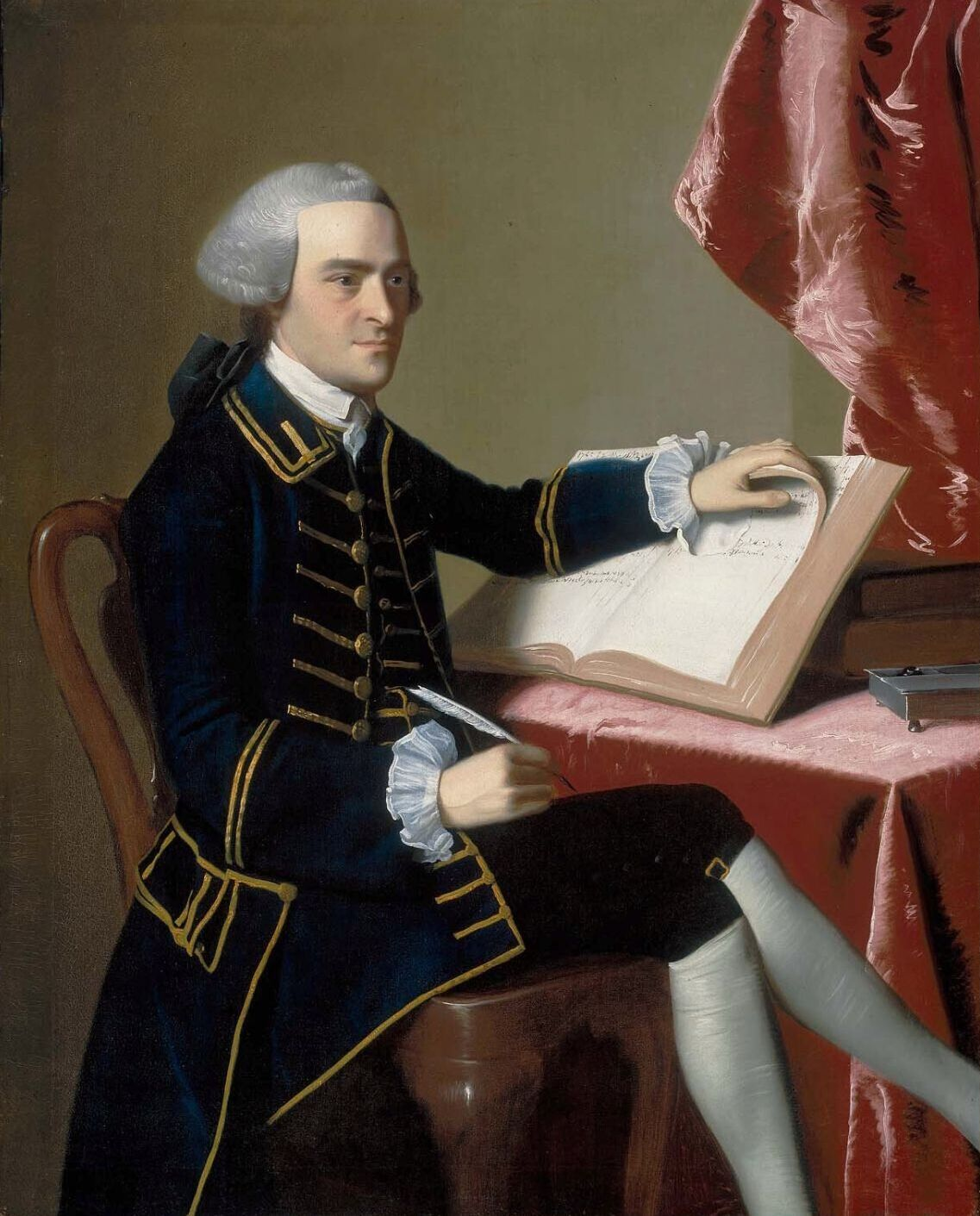
John Hancock (1765)

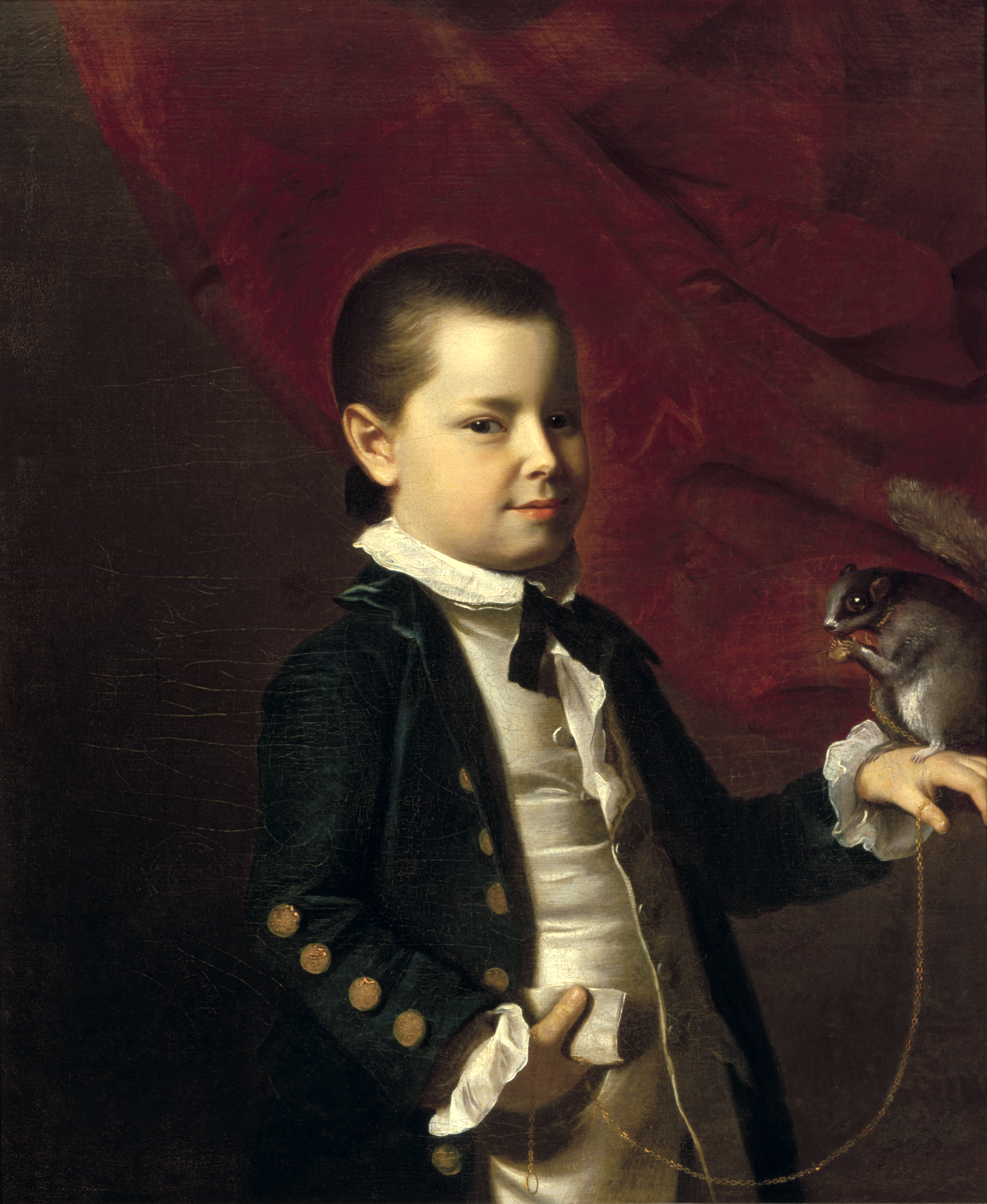
John Bee Holmes (1765)

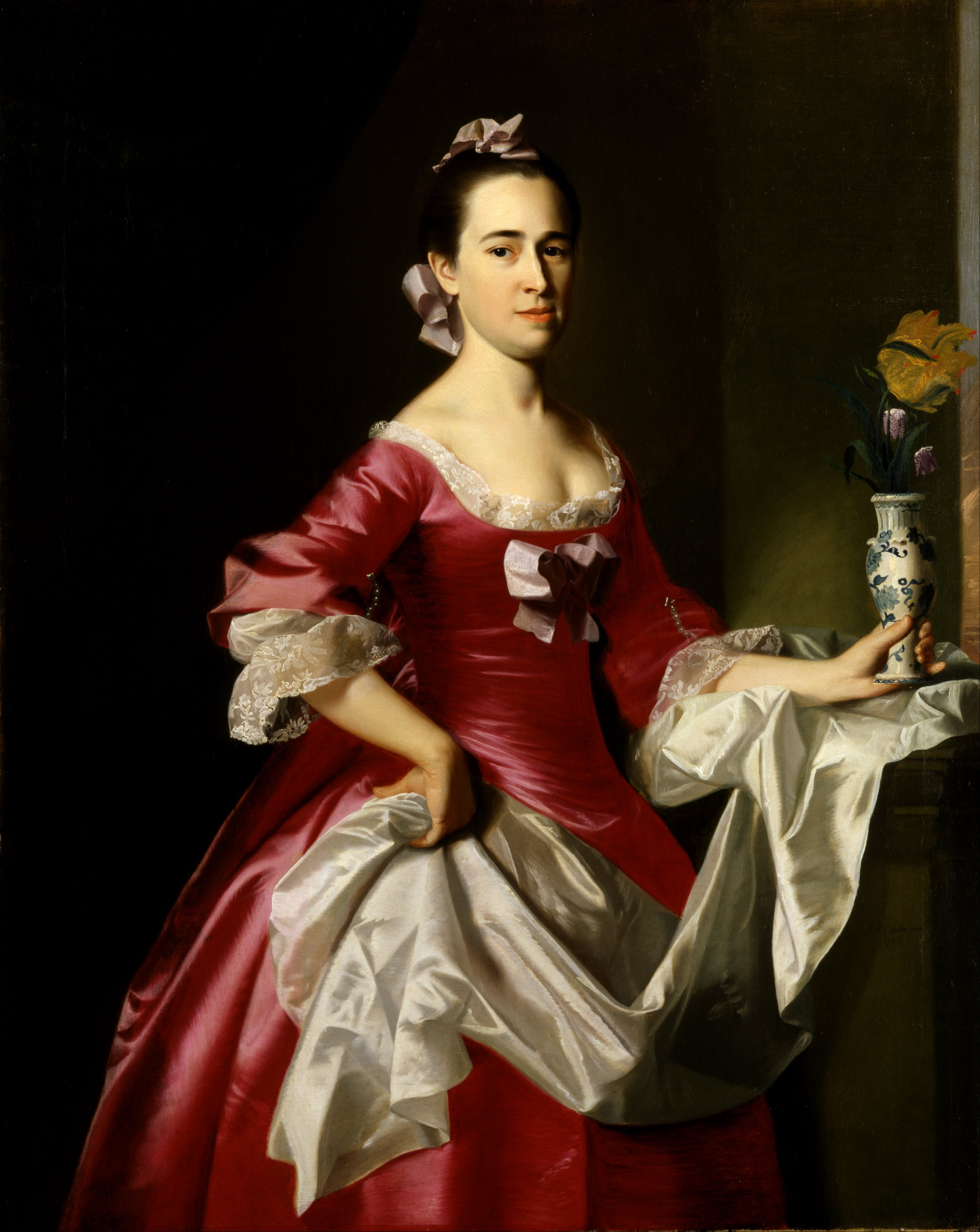
Mrs. George Watson (circa 1765)

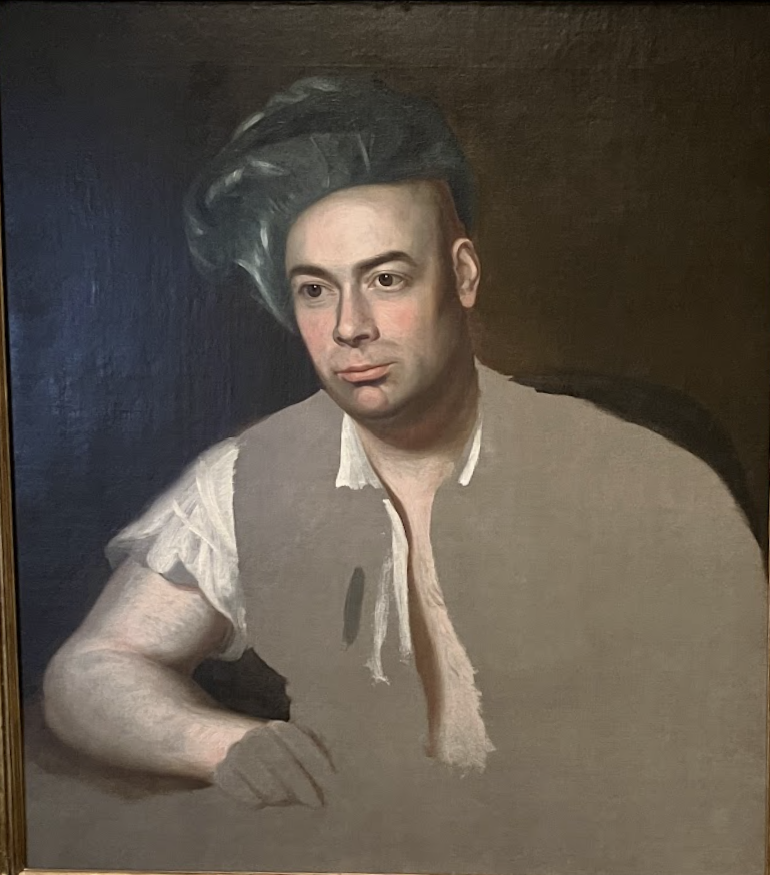
Nathaniel Hurd (circa 1765)

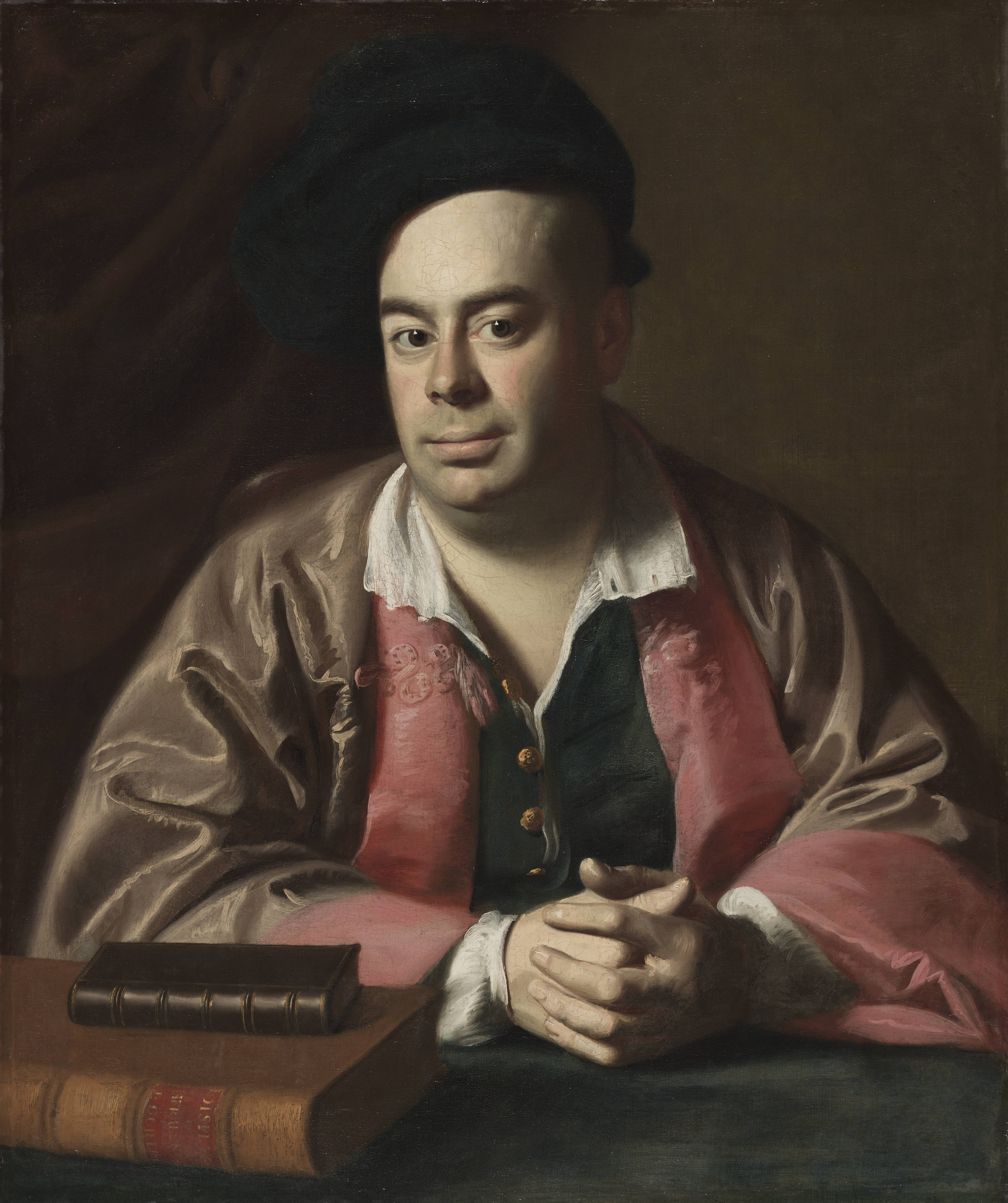
Nathaniel Hurd (1765–1766)

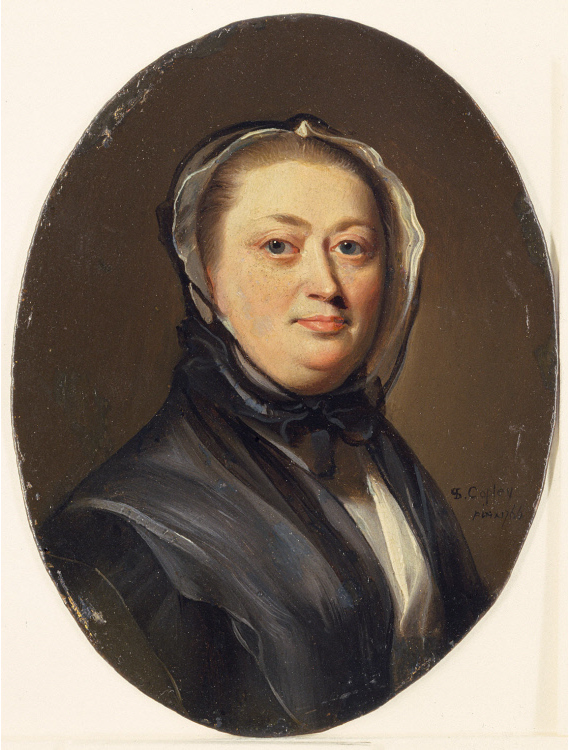
Lydia Henchman Hancock (1766)

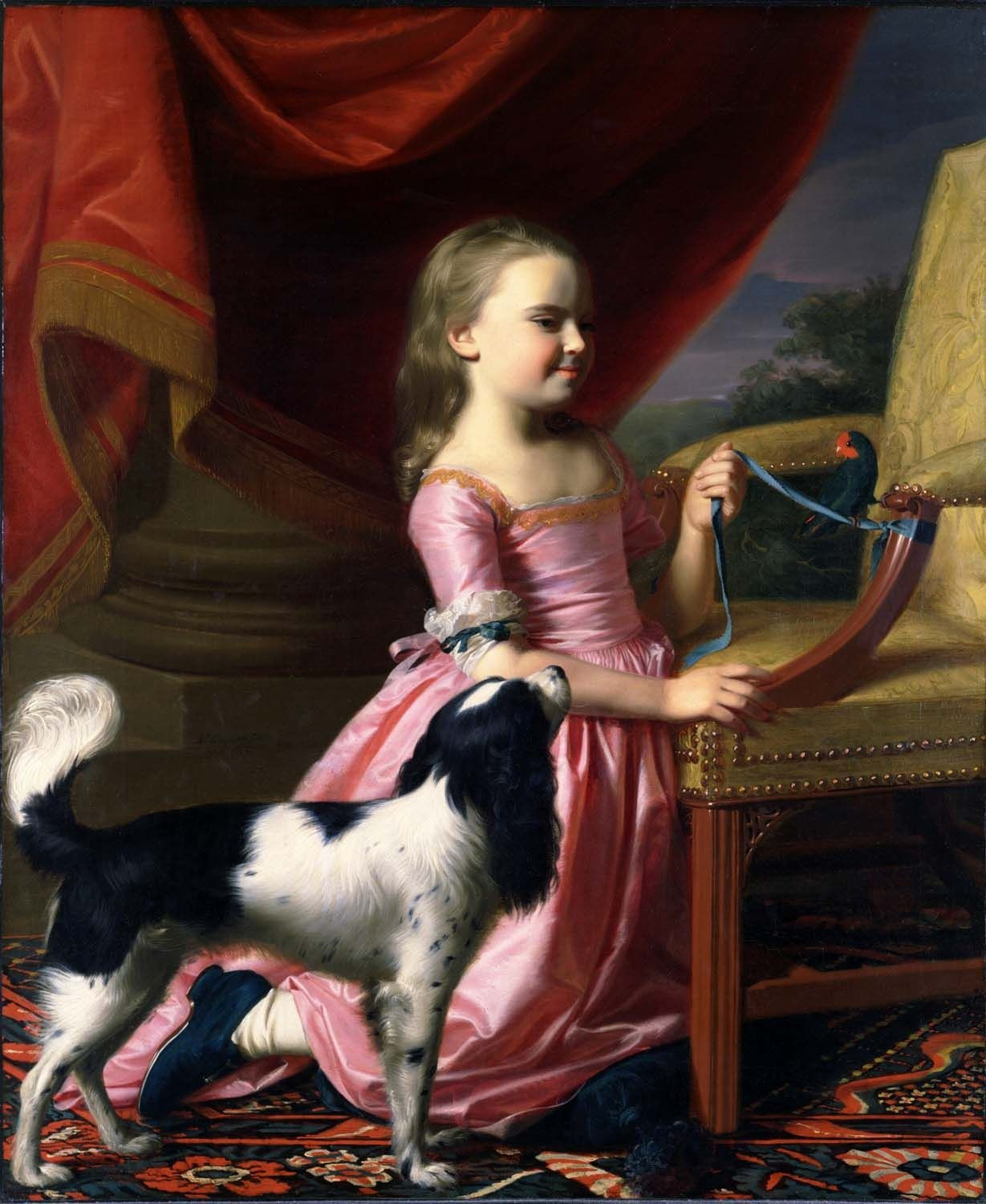
Young Lady with a Bird and Dog (1767)

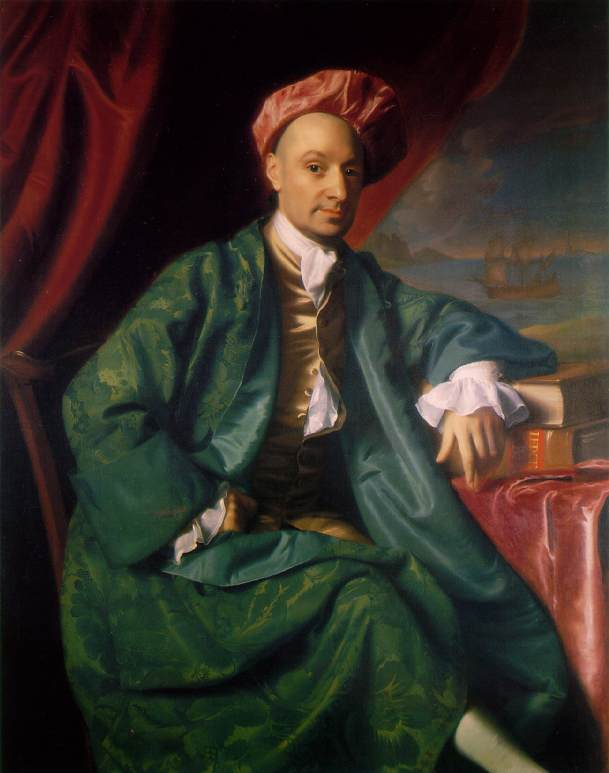
Nicholas Boylston (1767)

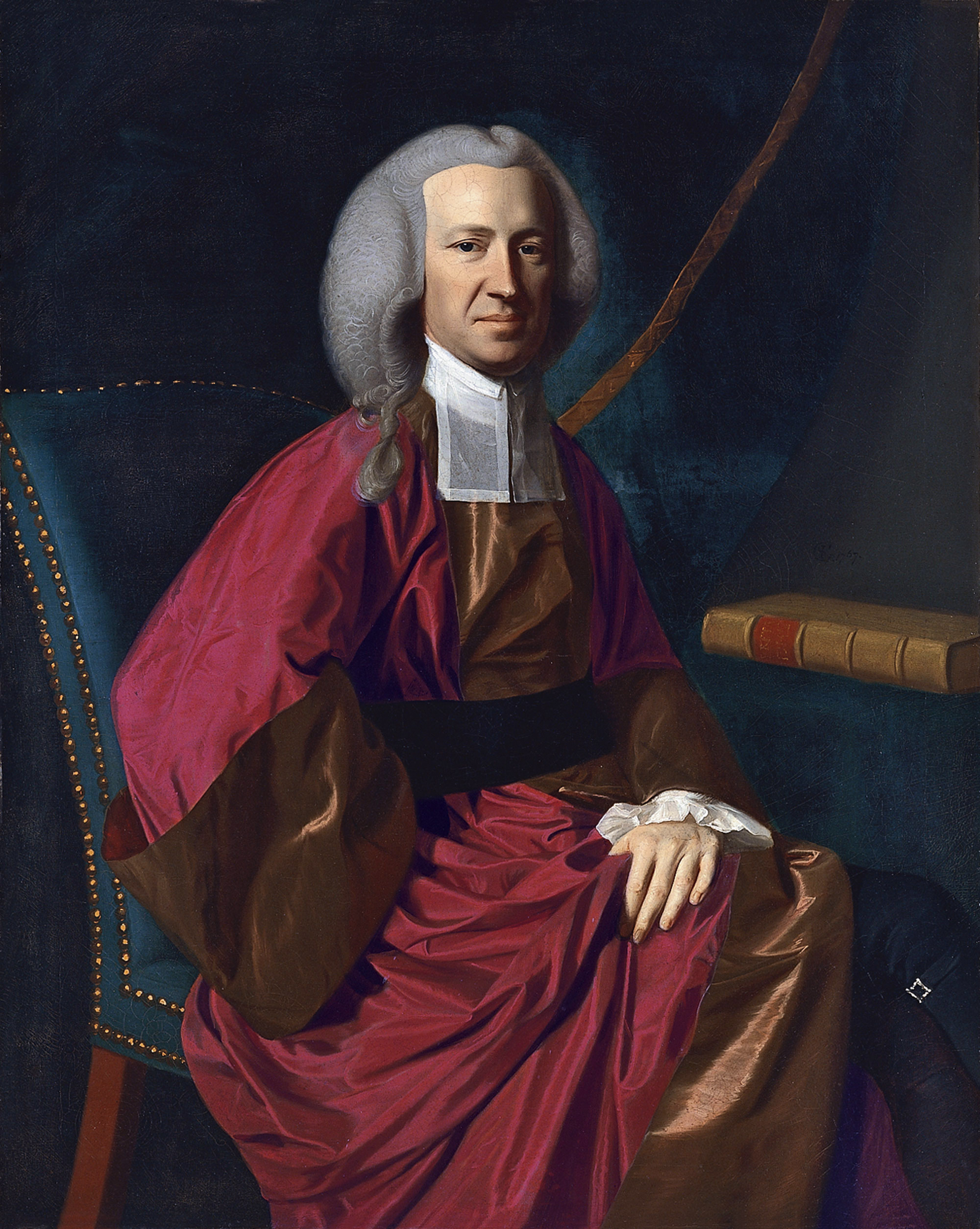
Judge Martin Howard (1767)

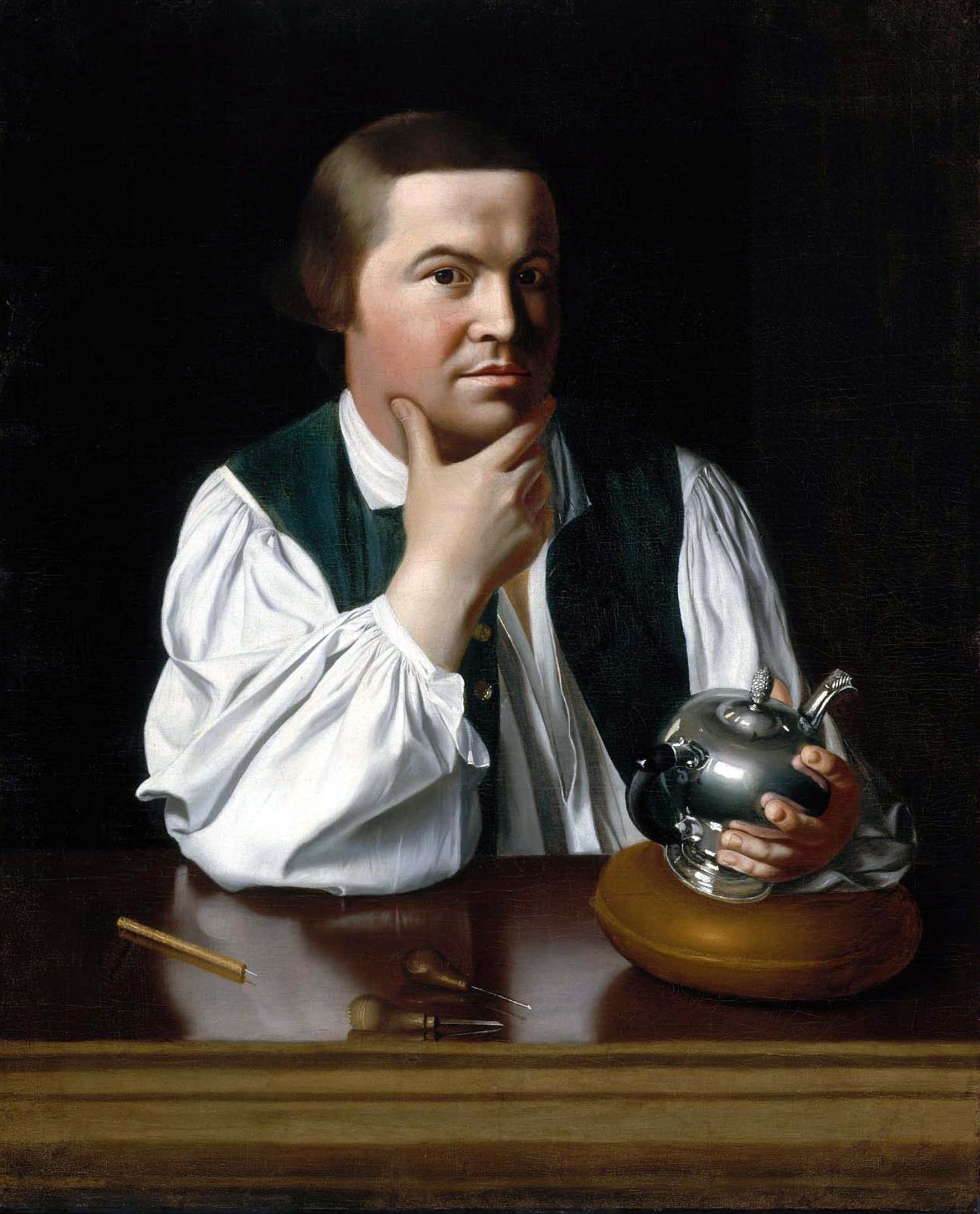
Portrait of Paul Revere (1768)

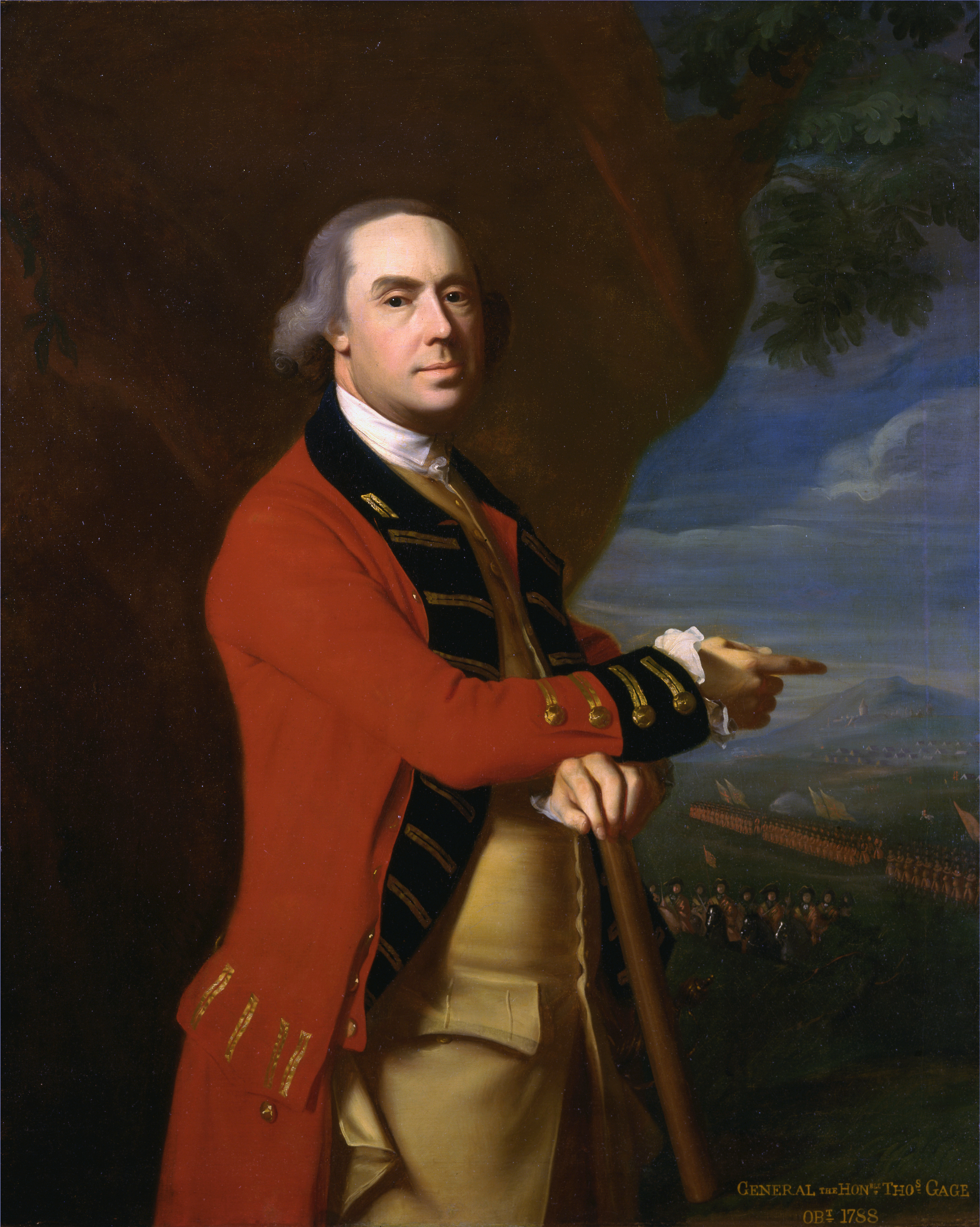
Thomas Gage (1768)

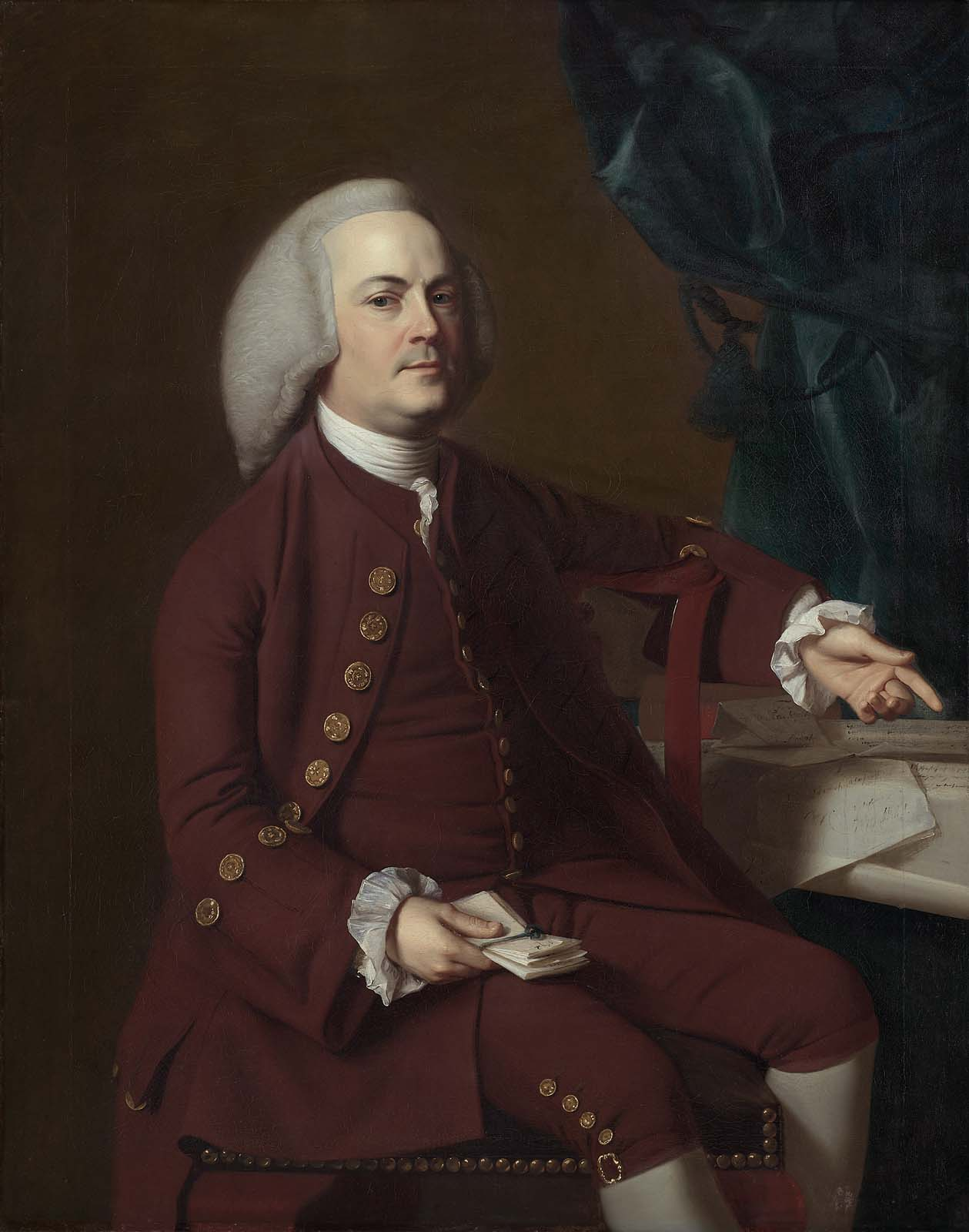
Isaac Royall (1769)

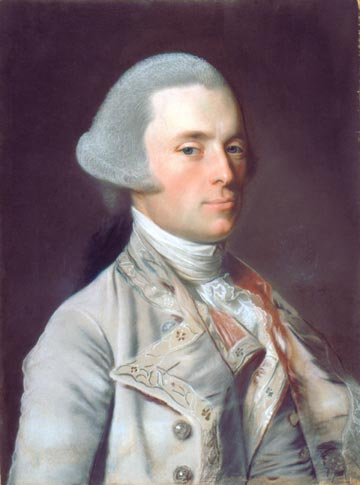
Sir John Wentworth, 1st Baronet (1769)

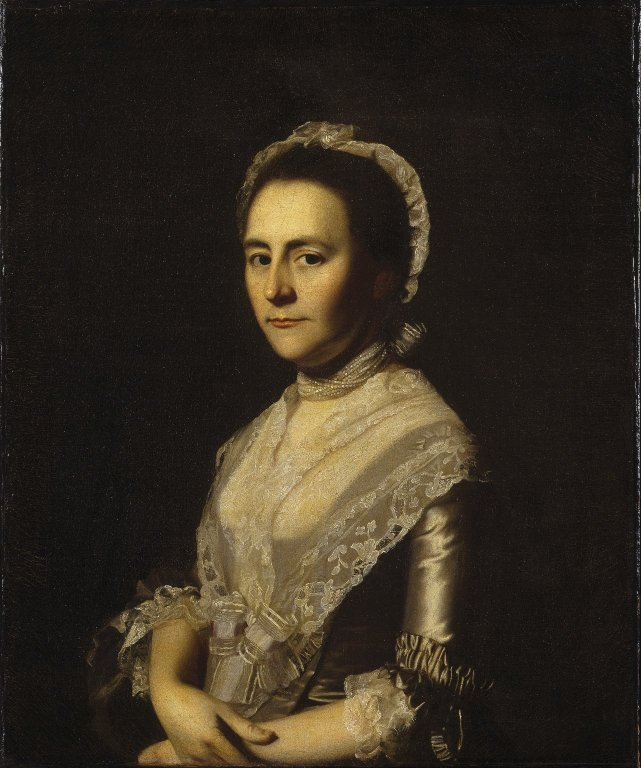
Mrs. Alexander Cumming (Elizabeth Goldthwaite), later Mrs. John Bacon (circa 1770)

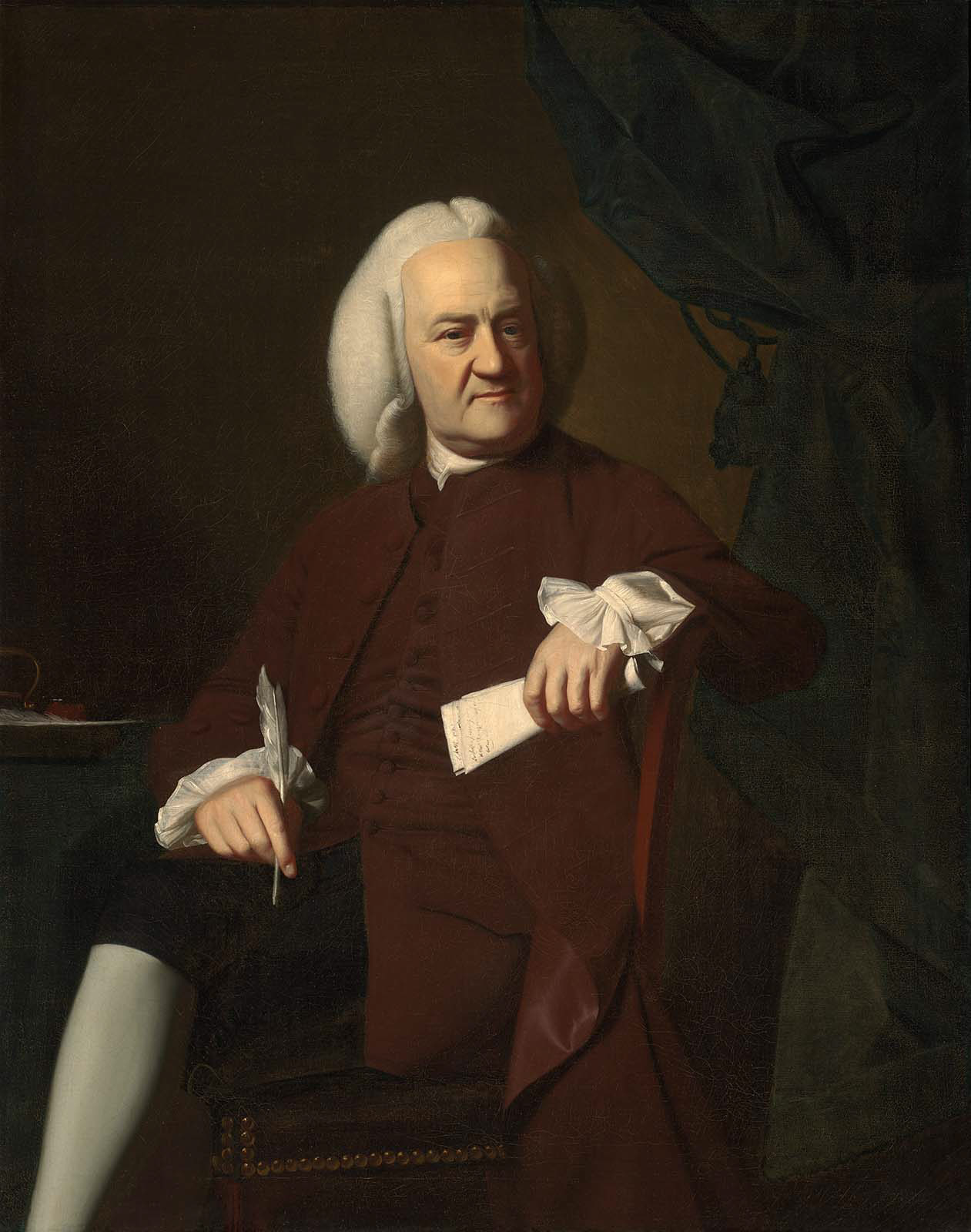
Ezekiel Goldthwait (1771)

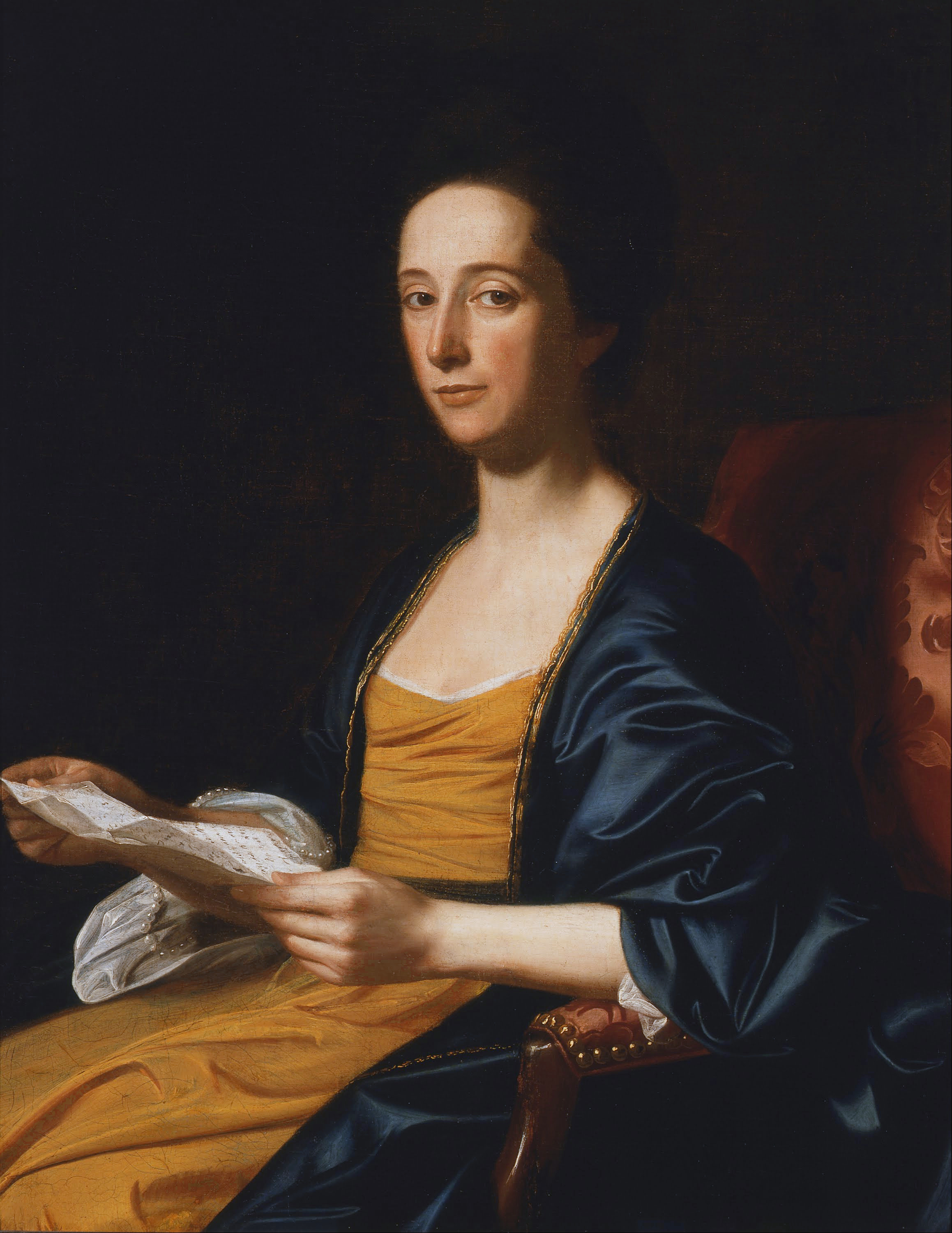
Portrait of a Lady (1771)

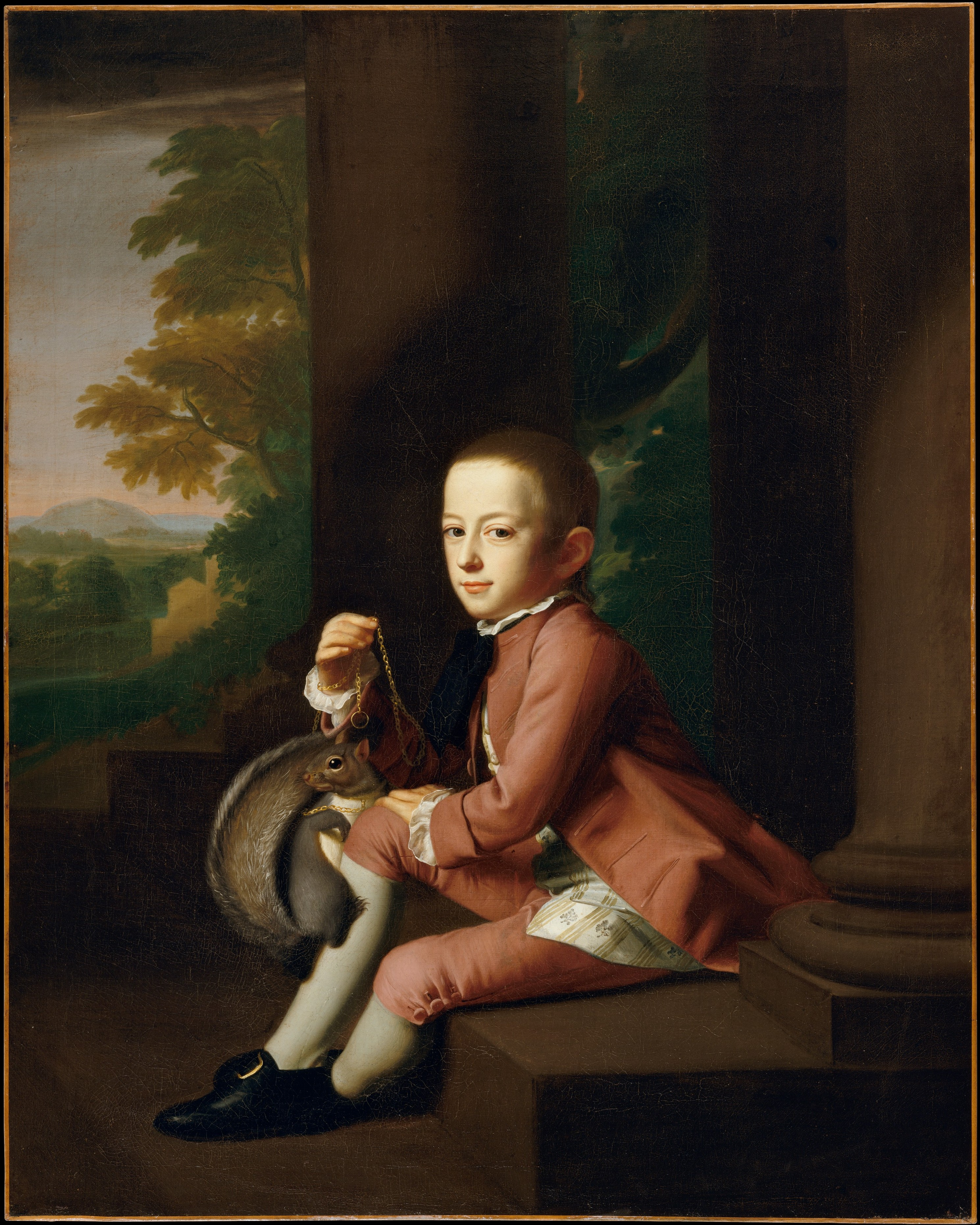
Daniel C. Verplanck (1771)

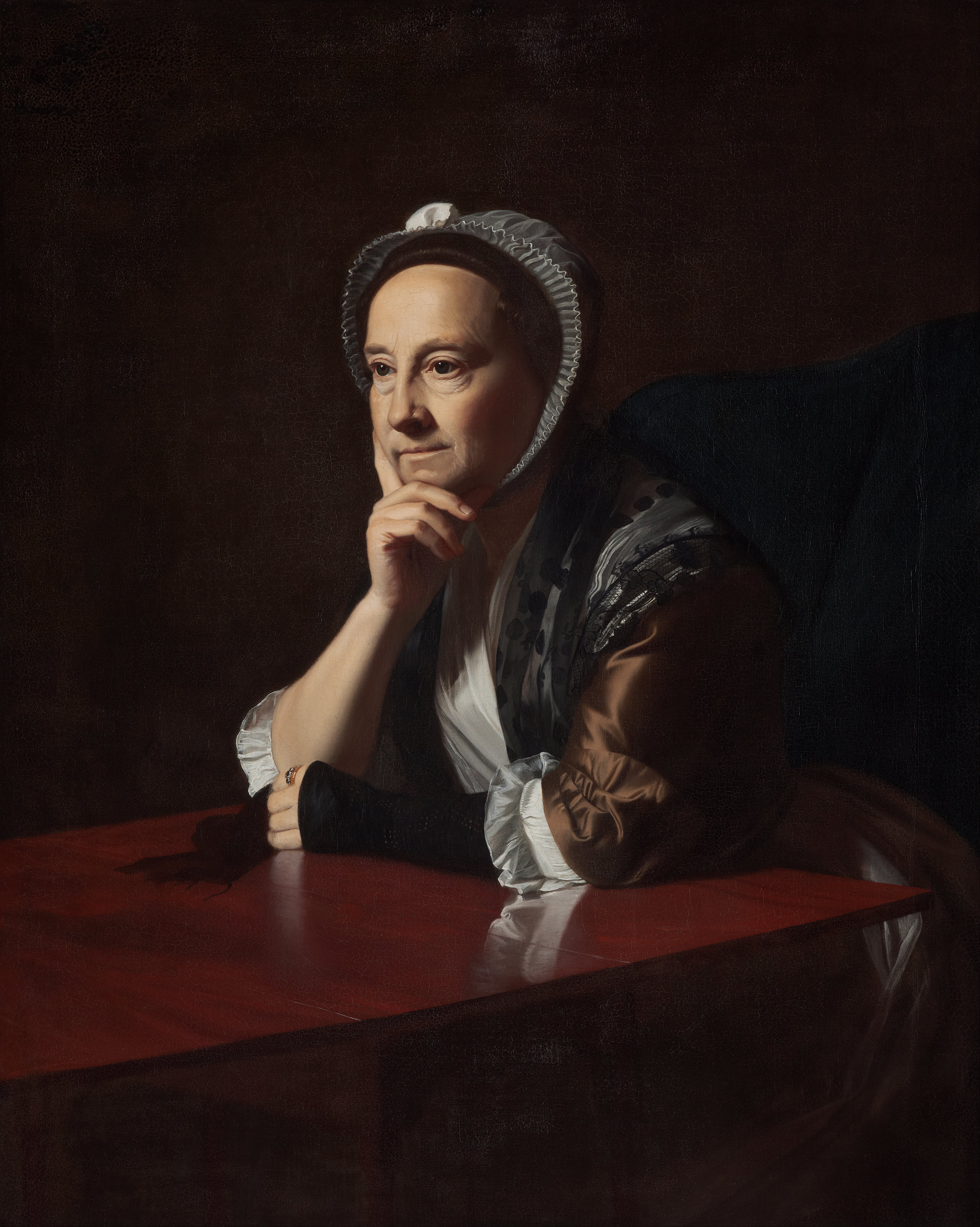
Mrs. Humphrey Devereux (1771)

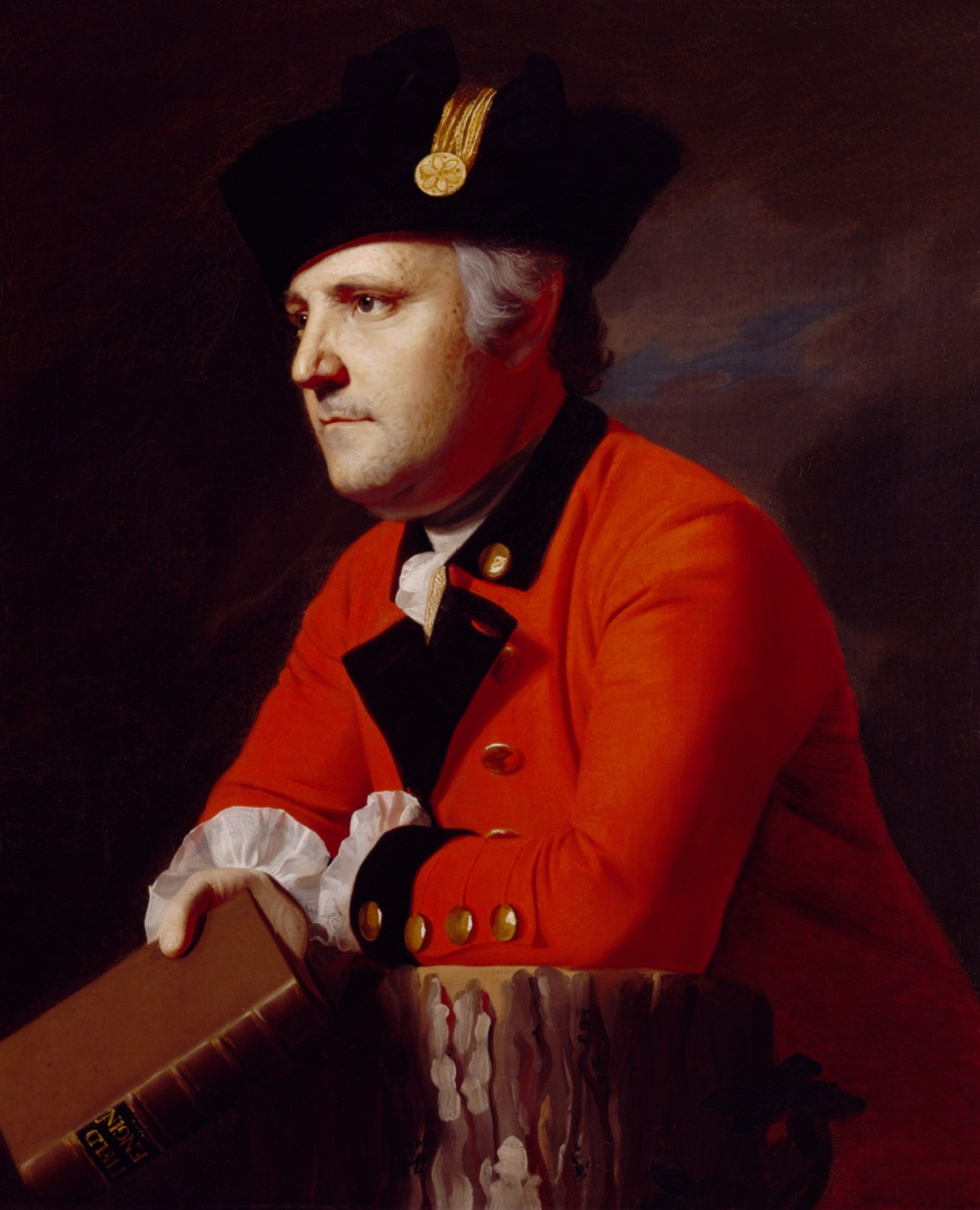
Portrait of John Montresor (1771)

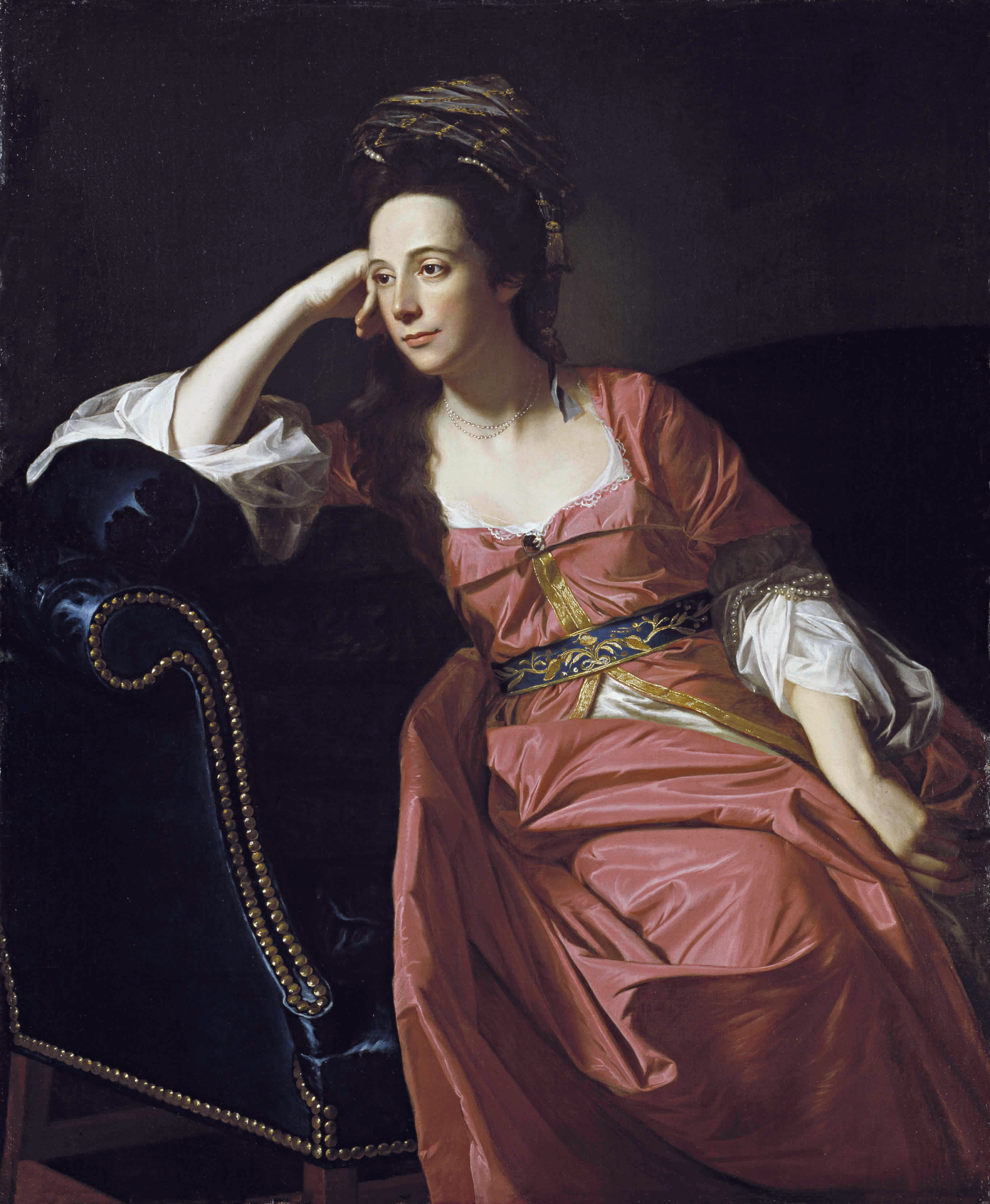
Mrs. Thomas Gage (Margaret Kemble) (circa 1771)

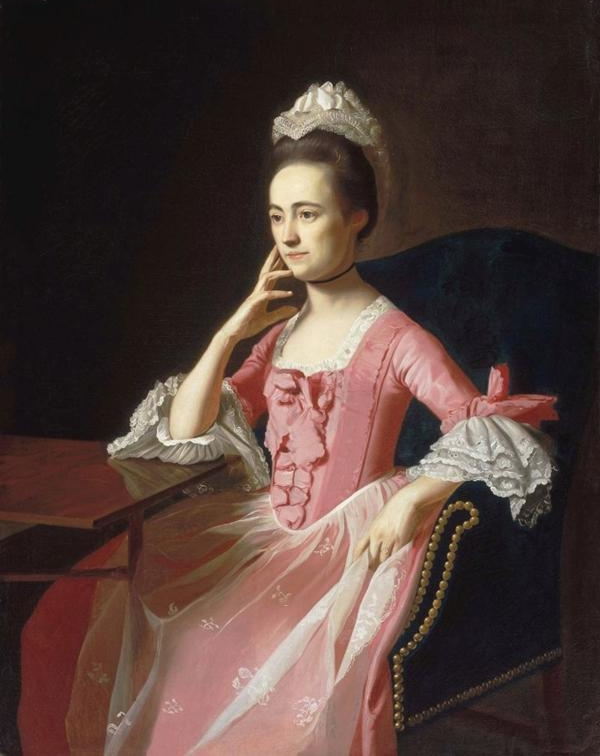
Mrs. John Hancock (Dorothy Quincy) (1772)

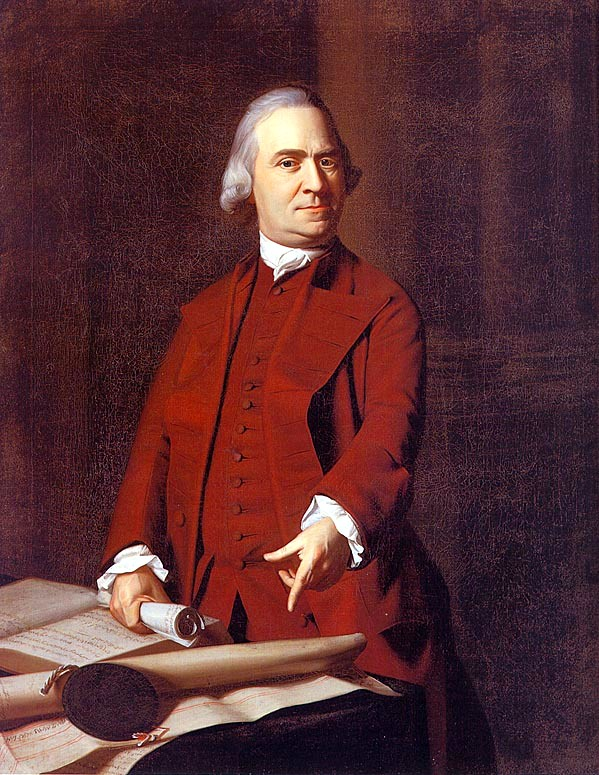
Samuel Adams (1772)

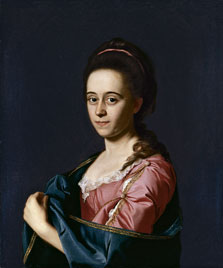
Mrs. Joshua Henshaw II (Catherine Hill) (circa 1772)

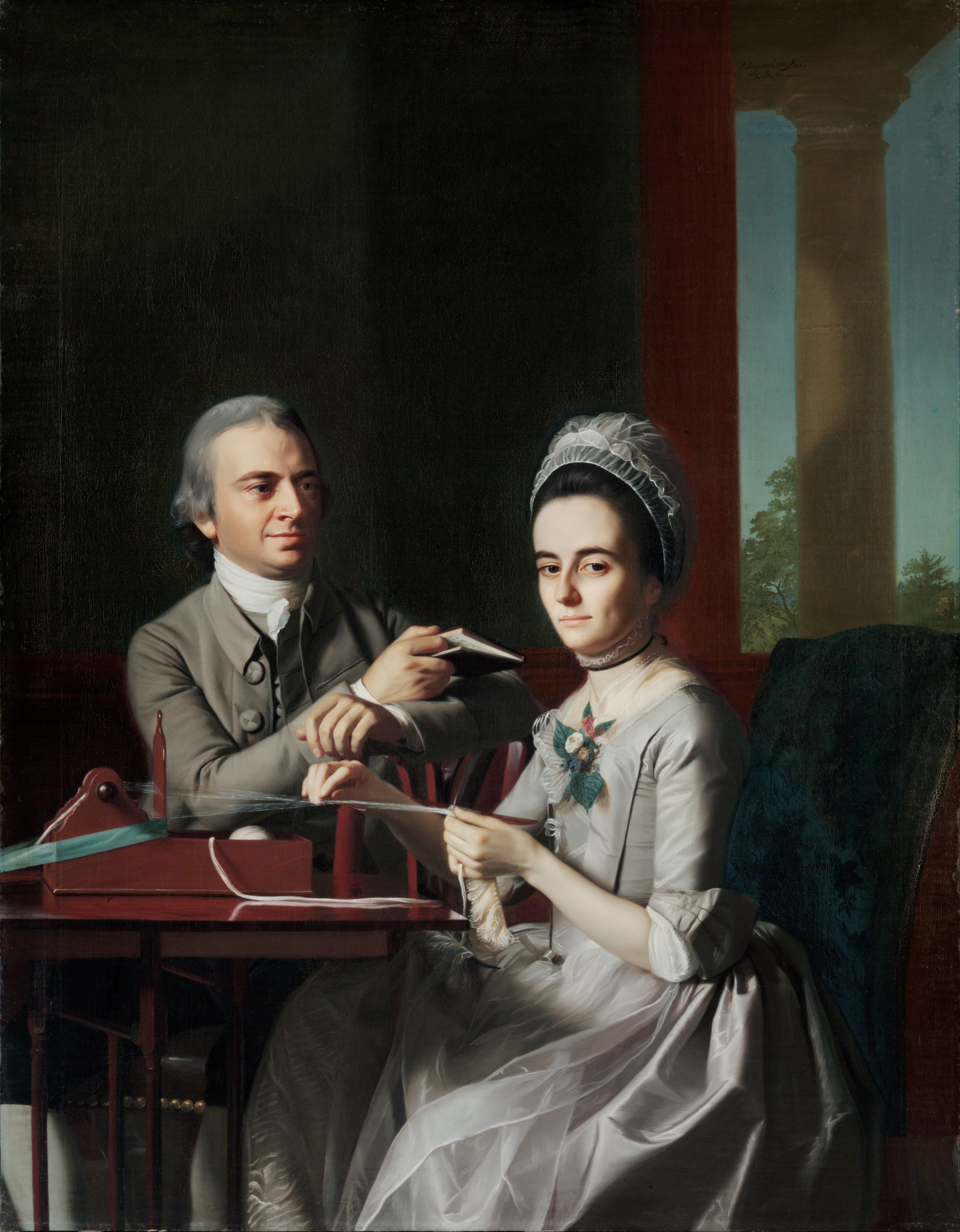
Mr. and Mrs. Thomas Mifflin (Sarah Morris) (1773)

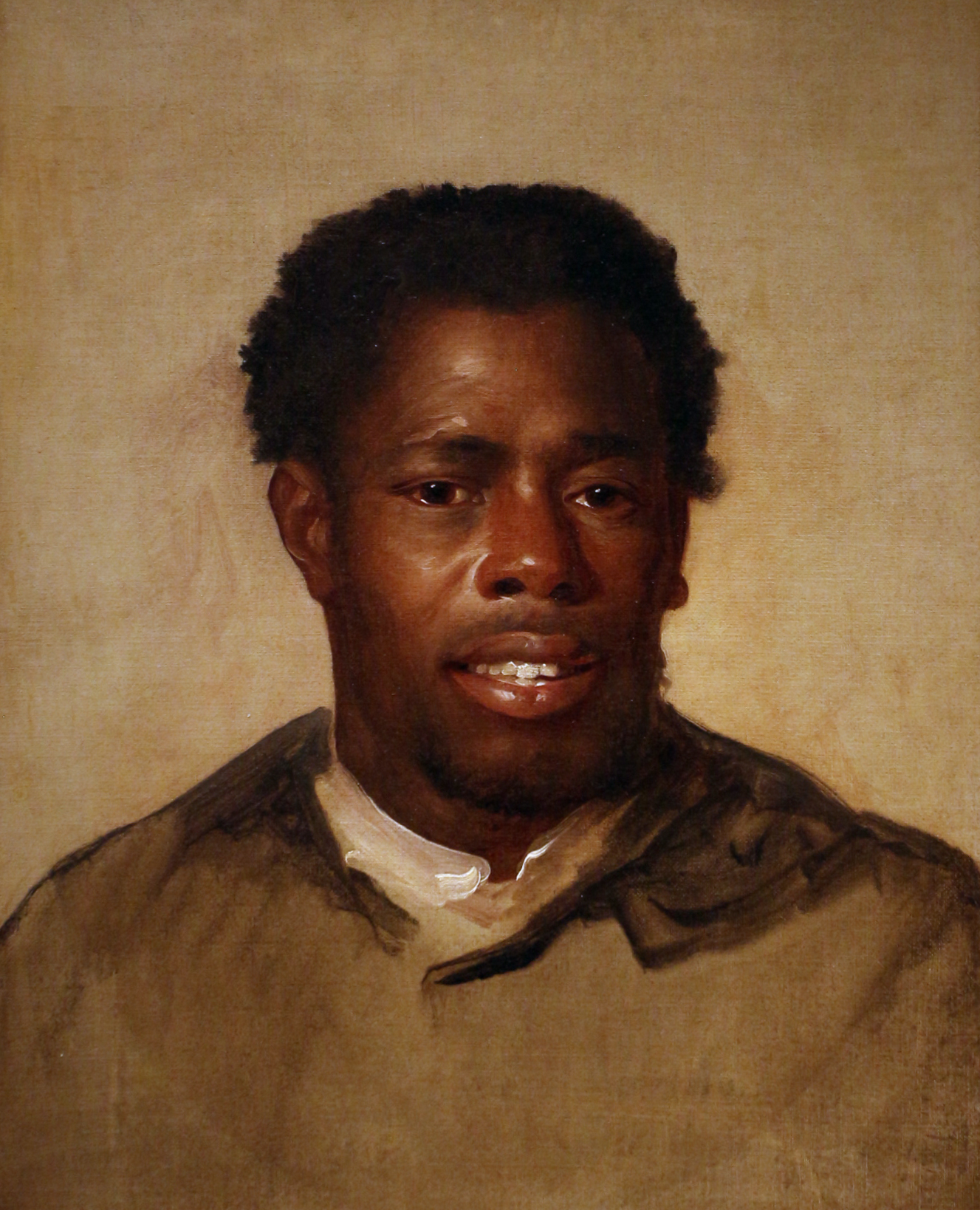
Head of a Negro (1777 or 1778)

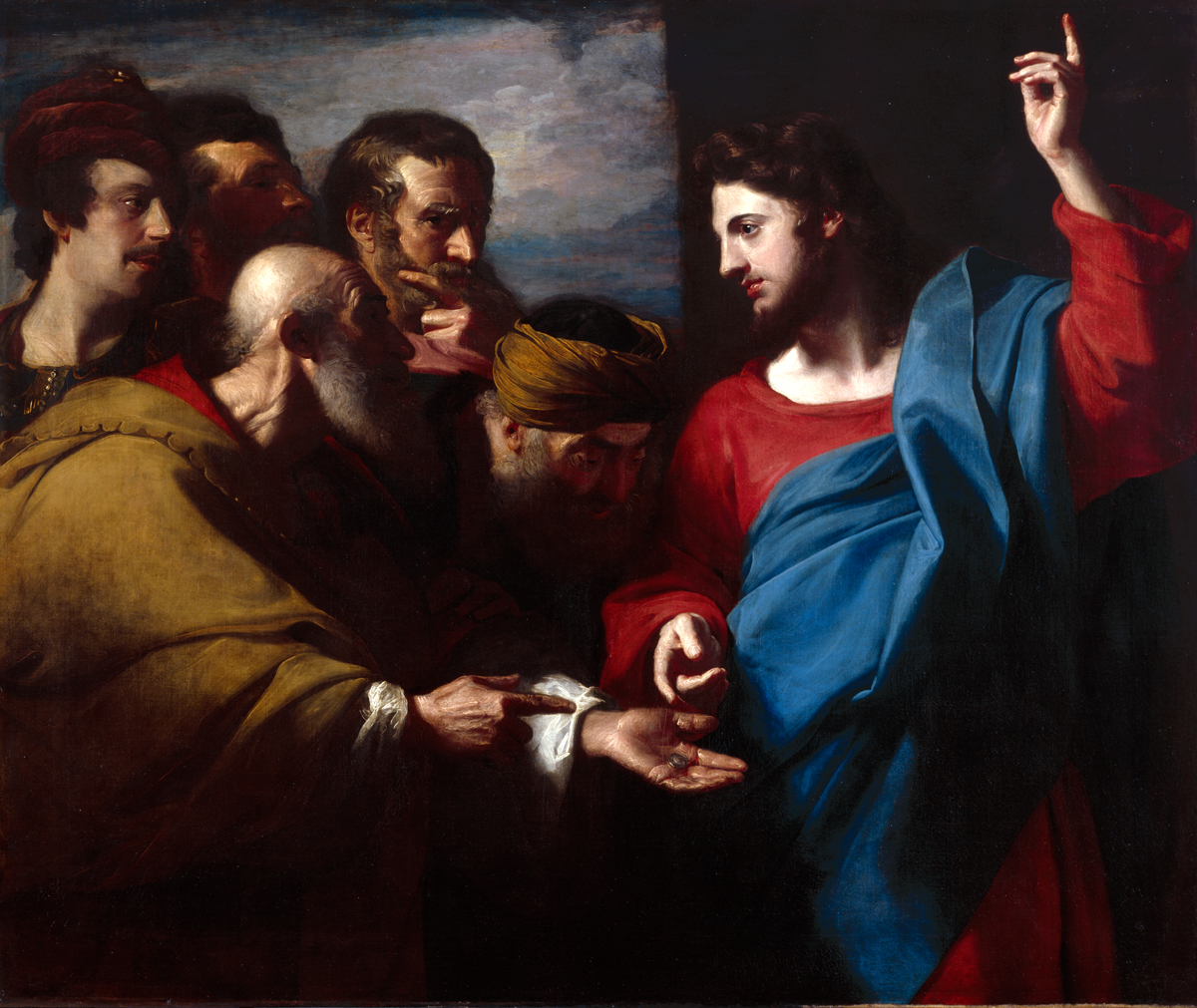
The Tribute Money (1782)

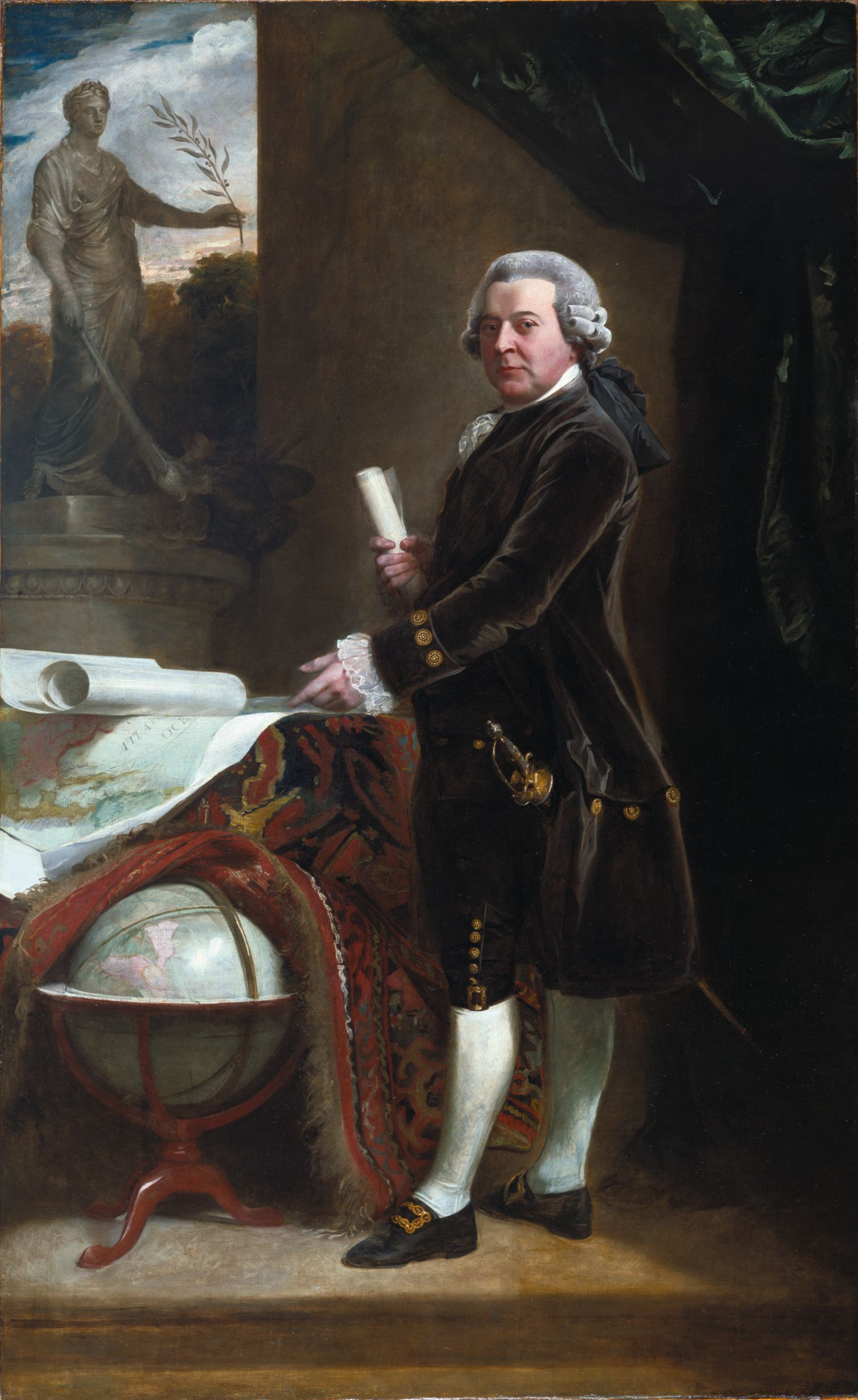
Portrait of John Adams (1783)

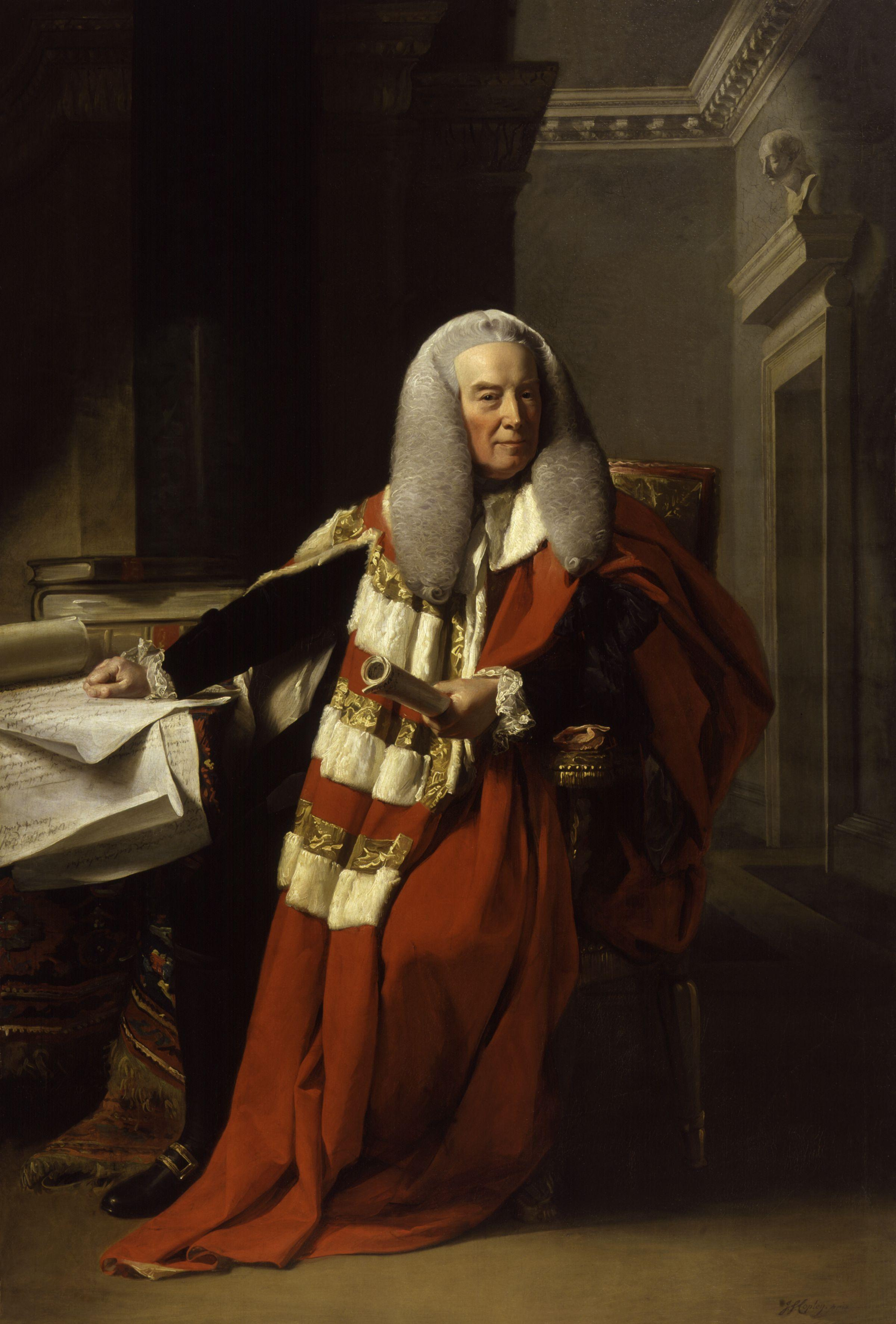
Portrait of Lord Mansfield, (1783)

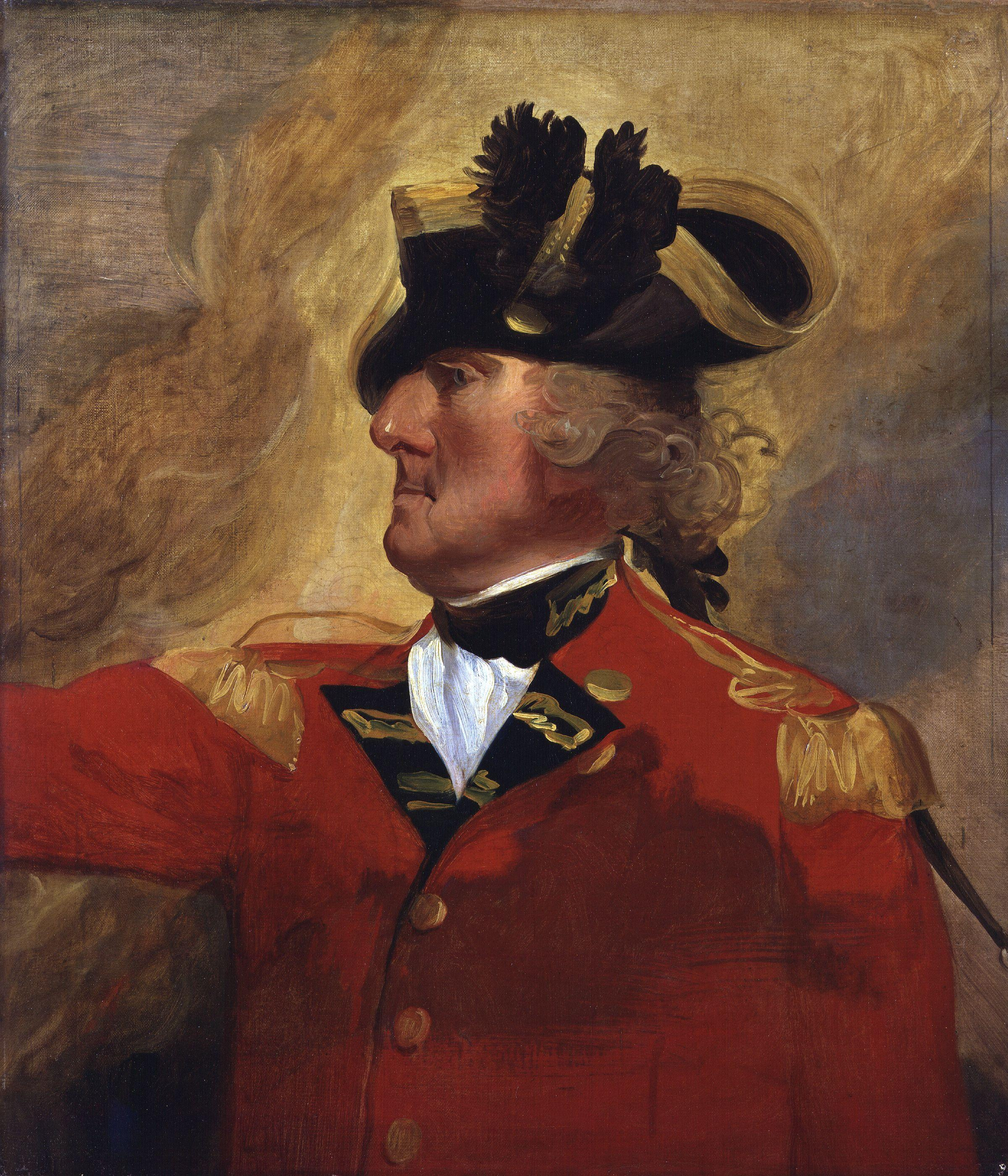
George Augustus Eliott, 1st Baron Heathfield (1787)

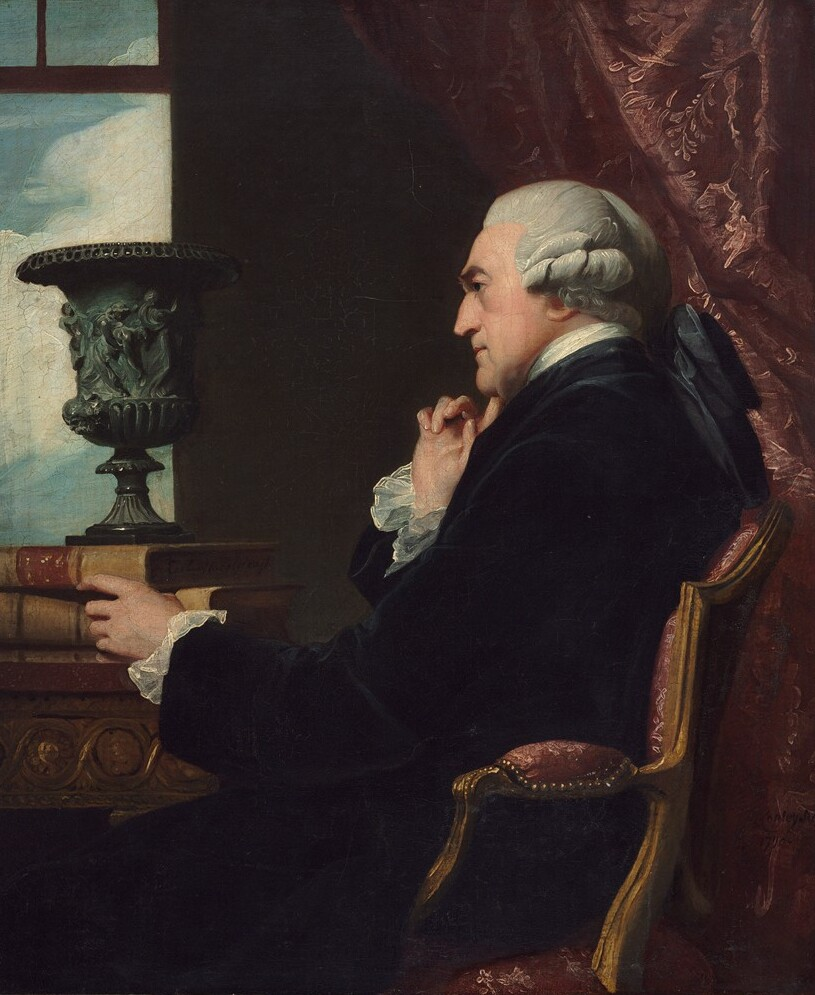
William Ponsonby, 2nd Earl of Bessborough (1790)

Colonel George Lewis (1794)

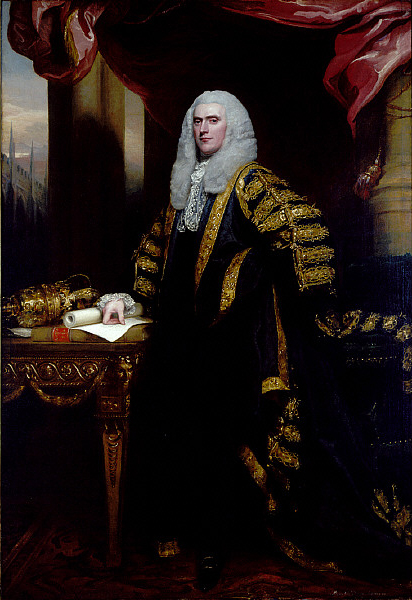
Henry Addington (1798)

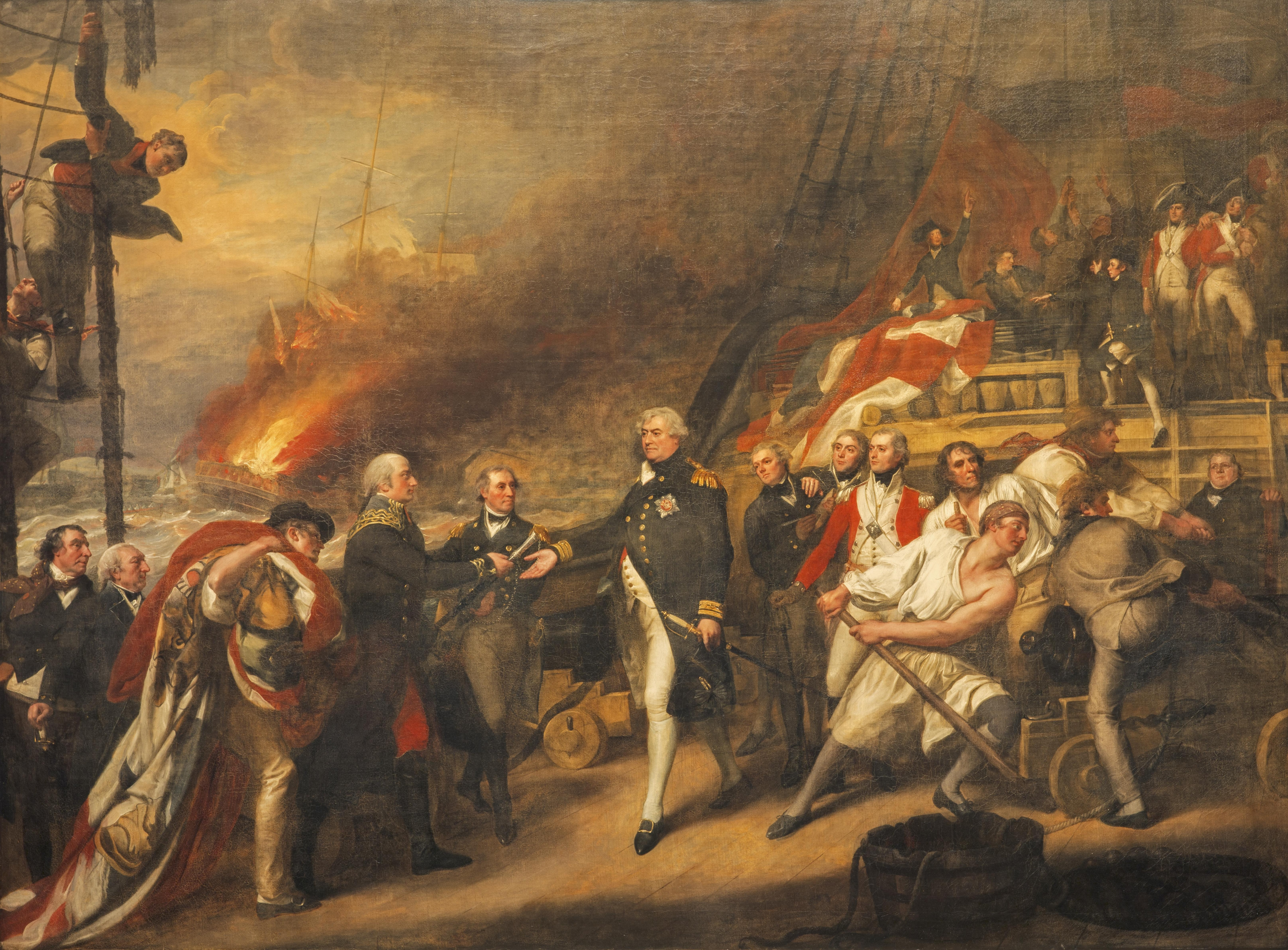
The Battle of Camperdown (1799)

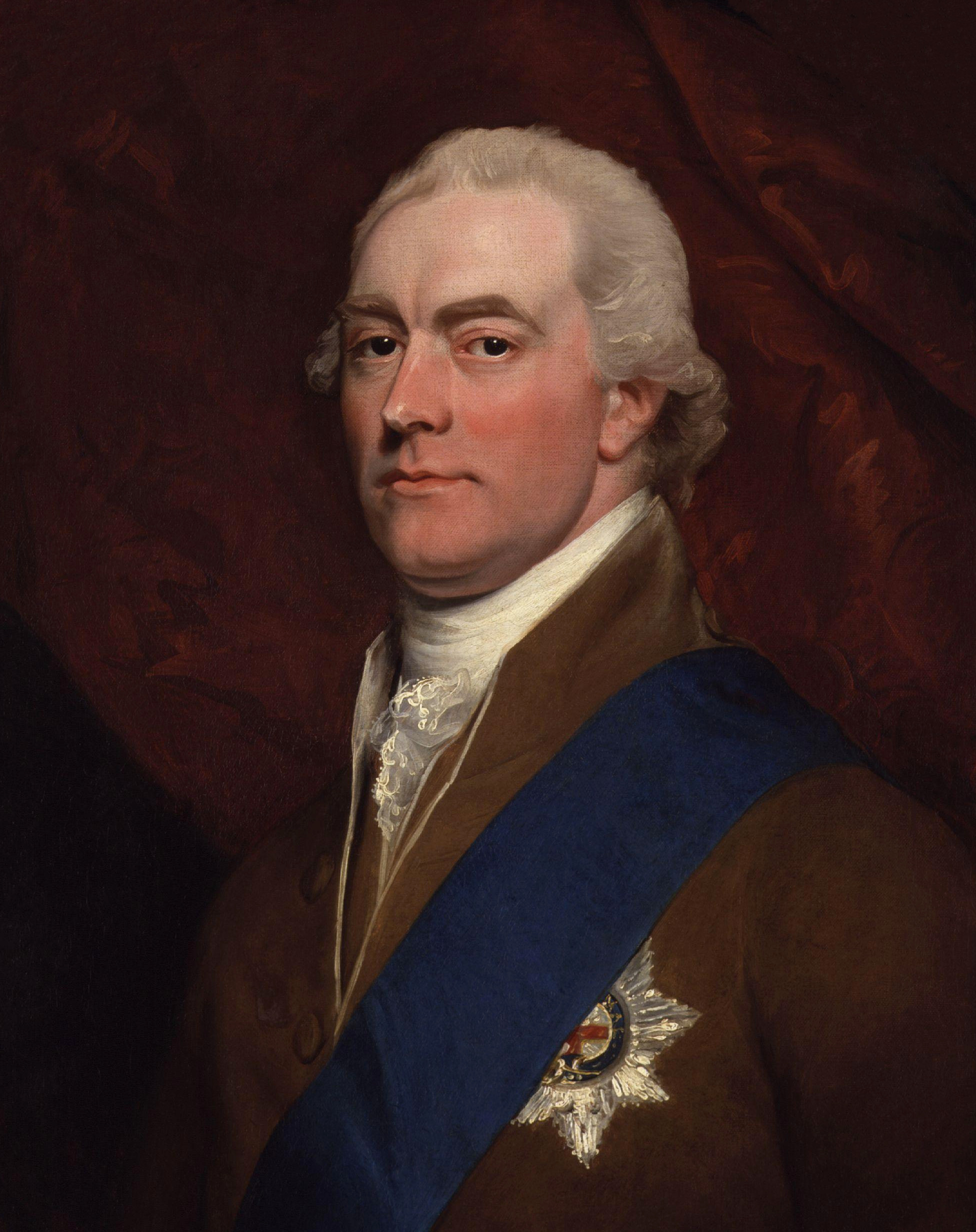
George Spencer, 2nd Earl Spencer (circa 1800)

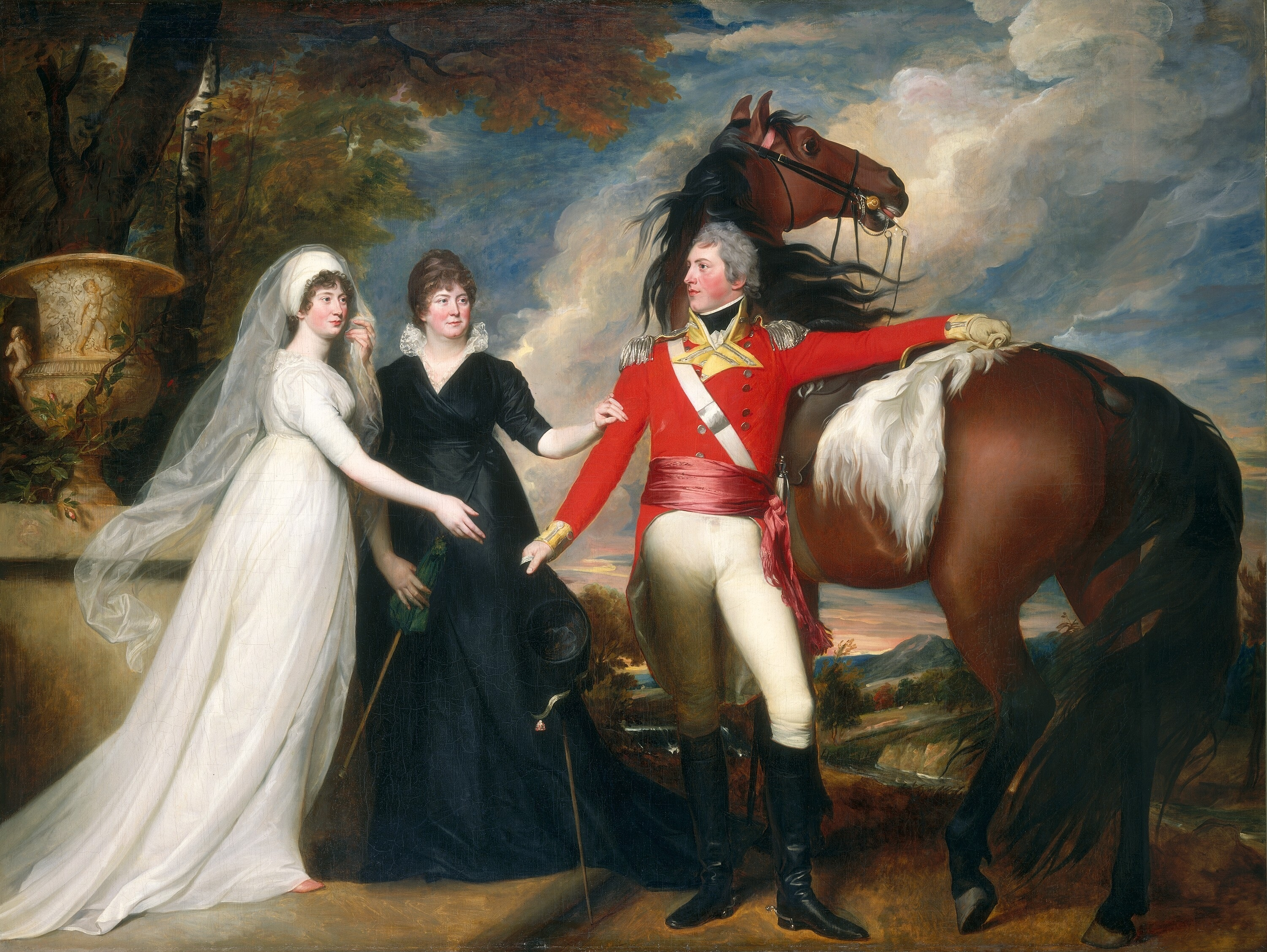
Colonel William Fitch and His Sisters (1801)

The Battle of the Pyrenees, (1814)
