= John Smith (engraver) =

English mezzotint engraver (c.1652–c.1742)

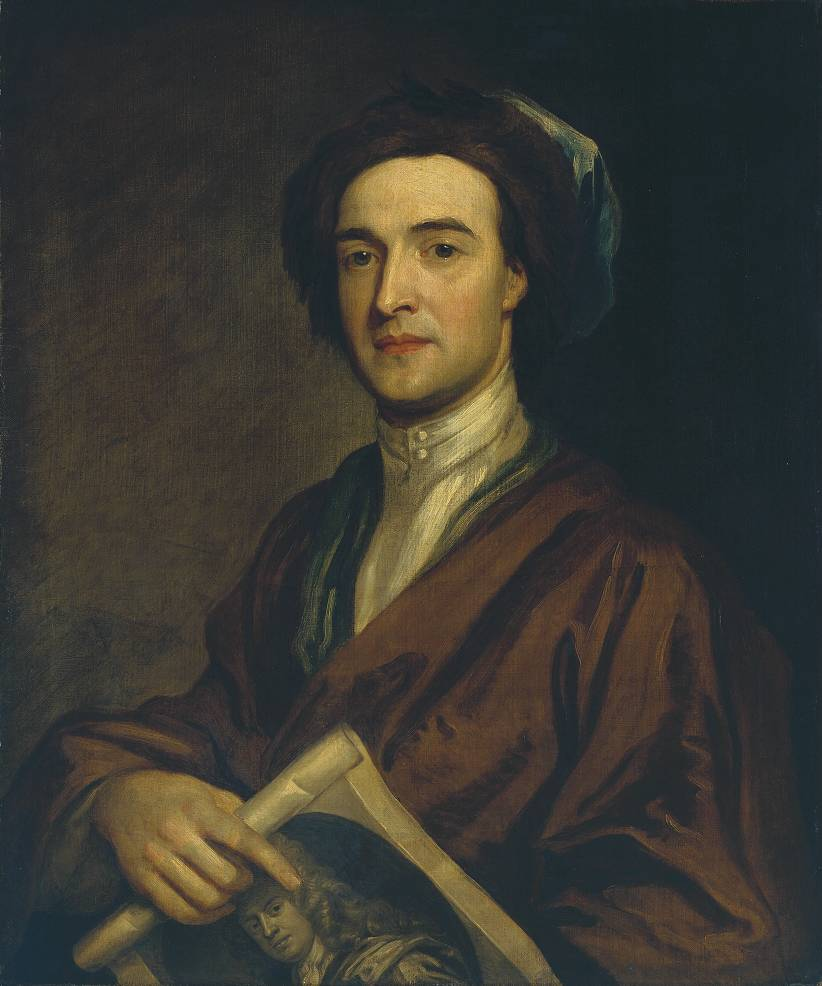
Godfrey Kneller, John Smith, 1696, Tate Britain, London

John Smith (c. 1652 – c. 1742) was an English mezzotint engraver and print seller. Closely associated with the portrait painter Godfrey Kneller, Smith was one of leading exponents of the mezzotint medium during the late 17th and early 18th centuries, and was regarded among first English-born artists to receive international recognition, along the younger painter William Hogarth.

== Life ==
Smith was born in Daventry, Northamptonshire, about 1652. He was articled to a painter named Tillet in London, and studied mezzotint engraving under Isaac Beckett and Jan van der Vaart. Smith became the favourite engraver of Sir Godfrey Kneller, whose paintings he extensively reproduced, and in whose house he is said to have lived for some time.

At the end of his career, Smith retired to Northamptonshire, where he died on 17 January 1742 at age 90. He was buried in the churchyard of St Peter's, Northampton church, where there was a tablet to his memory and that of his wife Sarah, who died in 1717.

== Works ==
Smith created approximately 500 plates; nearly 300 of these plates were portraits of notable men and women of the period between the reigns of Charles II and George II. Smith used pictures from artists such as Peter Lely, Godfrey Kneller, Willem Wissing, Michael Dahl, John Riley, John Closterman, Edward Gibson, and Thomas Murray. The rest of Smith's plates have sacred, mythological, and genre subjects after Titian, Correggio, Parmigianino, Carlo Maratti, Godfried Schalcken, Egbert van Heemskerck, Marcellus Laroon and others.

Most of Smith's early plates had been published by the renowned print seller Edward Cooper. In 1700, Smith became a printseller at the Lyon and Crown in Covent Garden and started publishing his own works. Smith also reissued many plates by Beckett, Bernard Lens, Williams, and others, retouching them and erasing the original engravers' names. Smith's latest print appears to have been the portrait of the young Prince William, Duke of Cumberland, after Joseph Highmore, dated 1729.

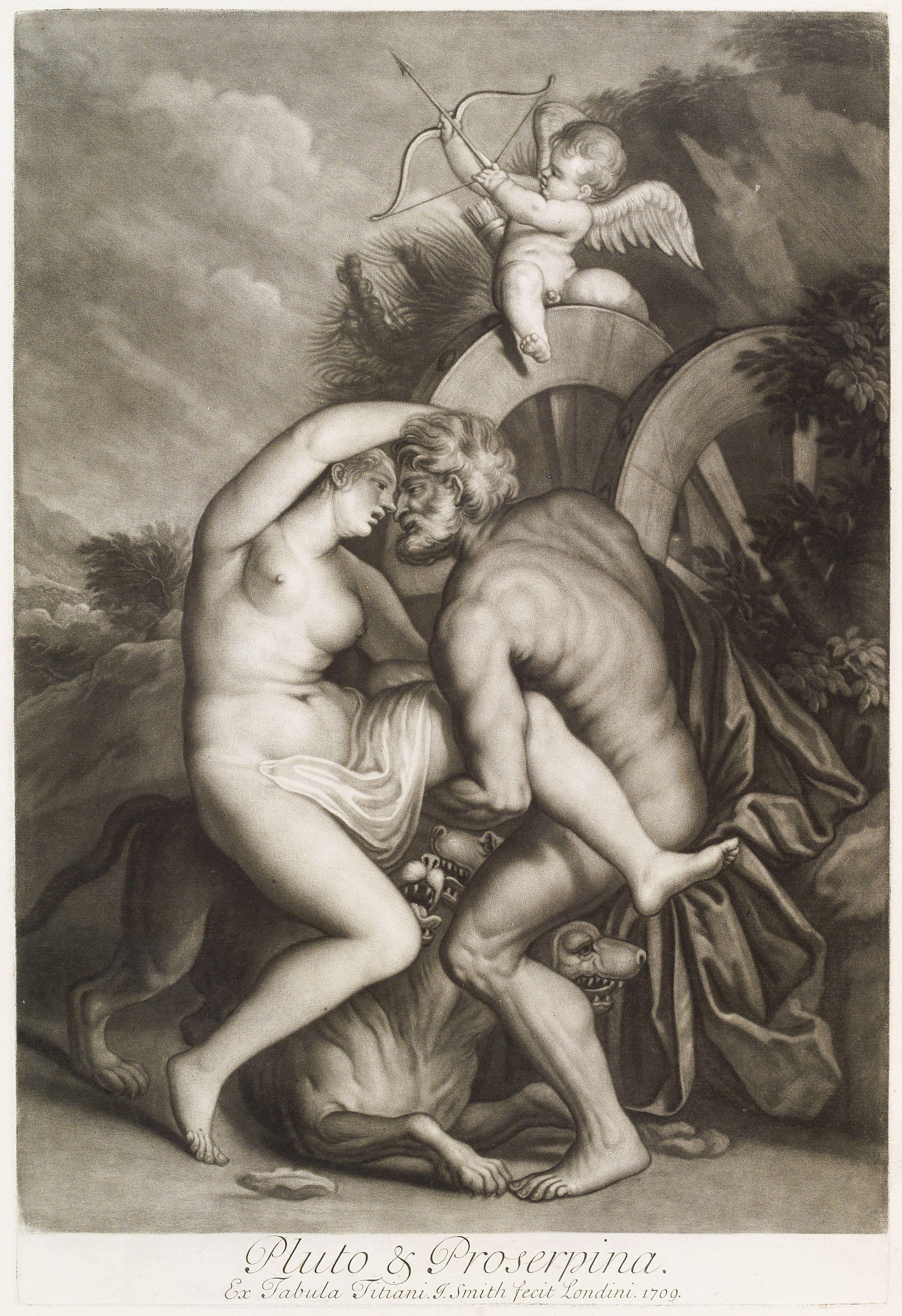
Loves of the Gods, after Titian

The bulk of Smith's copperplates eventually came into the hands of publisher John Boydell, who reprinted them in large numbers.

In 1696, Kneller painted a portrait of Smith holding a Kneller engraving and gave it to him. In 1716, Smith created a print from that portrait. Samuel Freeman later engraved that image for Horace Walpole's Anecdotes. Kneller's portrait of Smith is part of the collection of the Tate Gallery, London.
