= Edward Cooper (publisher) =

English print seller

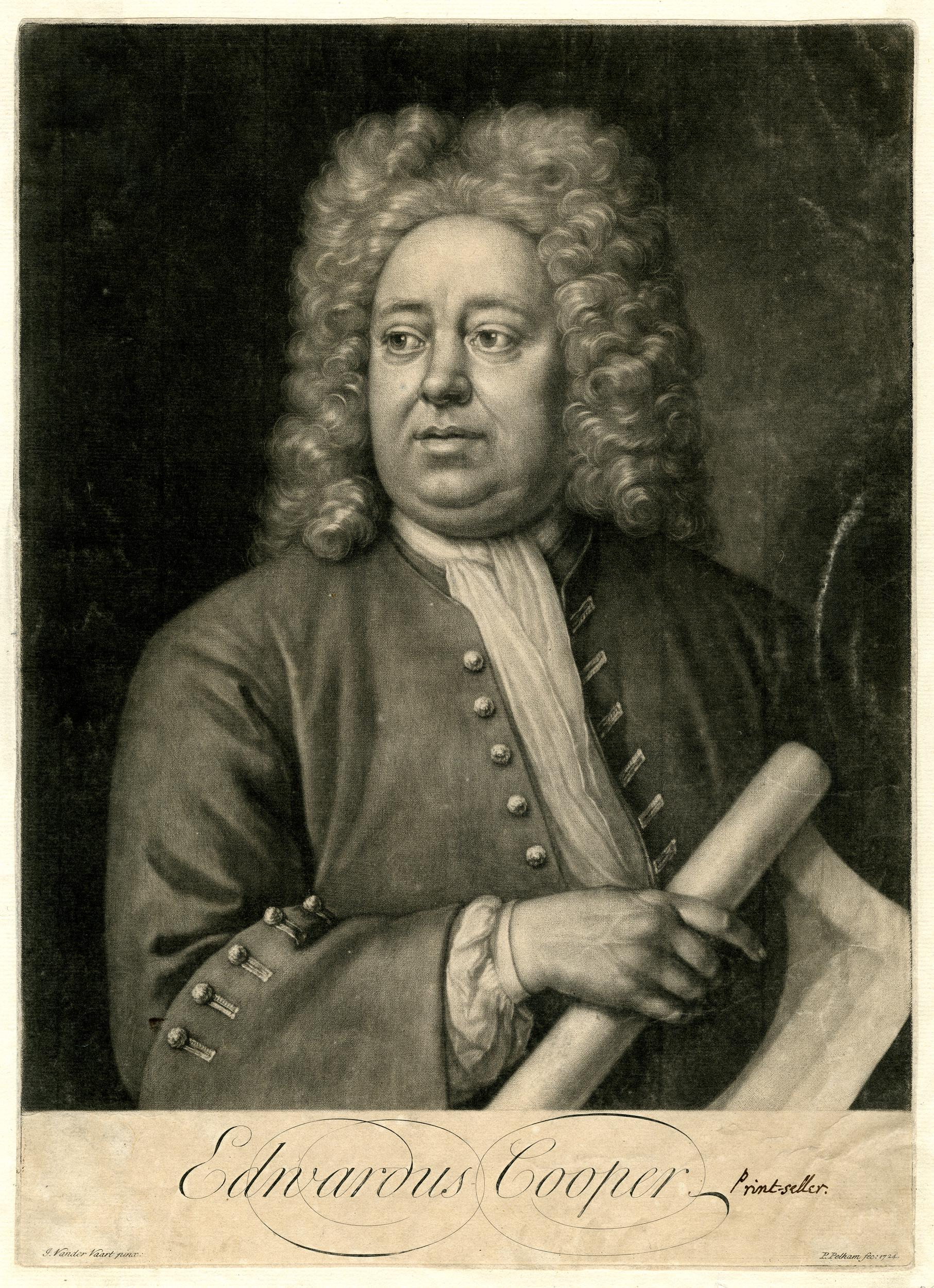
Peter Pelham after Jan van der Vaart, Edward Cooper, 1724, mezzotint; British Museum, London

Edward Cooper (fl. 1682–1725) was an English print seller, active in London from the late Stuart era to King George I's reign, regarded as the most distinguished print publisher of his generation and a leading figure in the art world.

== Life and career ==
Nothing is known of Cooper's early life; the earliest secure mention of him as publisher is an advertisement for an anonymous portrait of Thomas Thynne, published in the True Protestant Mercury on 21 February 1682. He first began to challenge the painter and publisher Alexander Browne's command on the mezzotint publishing business in 1684, and in 1686 he obtained a royal privilege protecting his plates against copies for a term of fourteen years. By this time, Cooper was already employing the mezzotint engraver John Smith and cultivating works by leading portrait painters, notably Willem Wissing, Frederick Kerseboom, Godfrey Kneller, and, soon after, Michael Dahl. He also published contemporary landscapes, still lifes, and genre subjects by Robert Robinson, Bernard Lens II, and Jan van der Vaart, and old master paintings, undertaking such important initiatives as a 1707 set of mezzotints made by John Simon after the Raphael Cartoons in Hampton Court Palace.

Mezzotint was the characteristic staple of Cooper's business, but he also issued some engravings and etching. Along with Richard Tompson, Cooper co-published c. 1682–1686 Peter Vanderbank's etchings after the ceilings in the north range at Windsor Castle; in 1691, he published Dirk Maas's large etching of The Battle of the Boyne. He also reissued some old plates, including a set of twenty-five Birds and Beasts, after Francis Barlow, later stolen during the view of the sale that followed his death. As a retailer, Cooper dealt in old master prints, imported Italian prints, and was named in advertisements as a principal distributor of such important English undertakings as Nicolas Dorigny's prints of the Raphael Cartoons and James Thornhill's prints of his designs for the cupola of St Paul's Cathedral.

Beside from prints, Cooper also sold paintings and artists' materials, and was widely acknowledged among England's leading connoisseurs. In 1703, he valued Robert Hooke's print collection and by 1711 he was distributing catalogues of important auction sales of paintings; it is likely that he was the cataloguer and possibly the auctioneer of many of these sales, such as one held in January 1719, reported in The Daily Courant that month. In 1714, Cooper was steward at the feast of the Virtuosi of St Luke, the exclusive club renowned as "the earliest organized group of art experts and art advisers" in England; he was a member of the Virtuosi from 1714 to 1720. He was also one of George Vertue's most entrusted informants about art history.

Throughout his life, Cooper remained at the Three Pigeons in Bedford Street, between Covent Garden and the Strand; with his spouse Priscilla, he had at least three children, Elizabeth, John (died 1729/30) and Priscilla. Portraits of all the family were later published as mezzotints. After at least four decades of activity, Cooper decided to retire from business in 1723, which was signaled by the advertisement for a sale published in The Daily Courant on 2 December 1723. At this point, he published his own portrait, a mezzotint engraved by Peter Pelham after Jan van der Vaart, showing a corpulent man holding a proof mezzotint; in his will, Cooper names van der Vaart as "a dear friend". Also in the will, he left a second house to his wife, while John was left one shilling, likely because of a fall out between the father and the son.

Cooper died early in 1725, and his death was followed by another sale, of household goods and shop goods; prints published by Cooper are present in the British Museum, London, and the Yale Center for British Art, New Haven, Connecticut. For a short time, he was survived by his son John, notable as a leading art auctionner during the 1720s; John was co-publisher of William Hogarth's 1726 illustrations for Hudibras, and published mezzotints of the Hampton Court Beauties, by John Faber the Younger after Godfrey Kneller, in 1727. John Cooper's spouse was the dramatist Elizabeth Cooper, remembered as the author of The Rival Widows and the compiler of The Muses Library.

== Sources ==
- Bignamini, Ilaria (1988). "George Vertue, Art Historian and Art Institutions in London, 1689–1768: A Study of Clubs and Academies". The Walpole Society. 54: 1–148. JSTOR 41829562.
- Clayton, Timothy (1997). The English Print, 1688–1802. London, New Haven: Yale University Press. ISBN 0-300-06650-3.
- Clayton, Timothy (2004). "Cooper, Edward". In Matthew, H. C. G. & Harrison, Brian (eds.). Oxford Dictionary of National Biography. Vol. 13. Oxford, New York: Oxford University Press. pp. 243–244. ISBN 0-19-861363-6. OCLC 1035751010 – via the Internet Archive.
- Griffiths, Antony (June 1990). "Early Mezzotint Publishing in England. II: Peter Lely, Tompson and Browne". Print Quarterly. 7 (2): 131–145. JSTOR 41824560.
- Tedder, Henry Richard (1887). "Cooper, Edward (d.1725?)" . In Stephen, Leslie (ed.). Dictionary of National Biography. Vol. 12. London: Smith, Elder & Co. pp. 141–142.
