= Jan van der Vaart =

Jan van der Vaart may refer to one of the following persons:

- Jan van der Vaart (ceramist) (1931 – 2000), a Dutch ceramist
- Jan van der Vaart (painter) (c.1650 –1727), a Dutch painter
