= Mary Singleton Copley Pelham =

Irish-American colonial settler (c. 1710 – 1789)

- Born: Mary Singleton c. 1710
- Died: April 29, 1789 (aged 78–79)
- Other names: Mary Singleton Copley; Mary Pelham
- Spouses: Richard Copley (died 1748), Peter Pelham (m. 1748; died 1751)
- Children: John Singleton Copley (son); Henry Pelham (son); Five step-children

Mary Singleton Copley Pelham (c. 1710 – April 29, 1789) was an Irish-American colonial settler. Her son was the artist John Singleton Copley. She operated a tobacco retail and wholesale business and taught education, art, and manners classes. By 1751, she had been widowed twice. Her sons, John Singleton Copley and Henry Pelham were accomplished artists. She was step-mother to her second husband, Peter Pelham's five children.

== Early life ==
Mary Singleton was born c. 1710 and was the daughter of Jane (Bruffel) Singleton and John Singleton. She had two siblings and lived in Quinville Abbey in County Clare, Ireland. Her Singleton ancestors came to Ireland in 1661 from Lancashire, England.

== Marriages and children ==
Mary Singleton married Richard Copley in Ireland in about 1735, according to family tradition. Richard's father was likely Charles Copley, who was a sheriff of Limerick, an alderman, and one of the landed gentry. Their son, John Singleton Copley, was born on July 3, 1738. (Note: July 3, 1738 is the date of birth in John Singleton Copley's article. He is also said to have been born July 26, 1738, or one year earlier.) Within a year of their marriage or about the time of John's birth, the family immigrated to Boston of the Massachusetts Bay Colony. Richard established a tobacco shop on Long Wharf. Richard died before May 6, 1748, when an inventory was taken of his estate. (Note: Richard Copley likely died after 1741 when he was involved in a lawsuit to recover debts.)

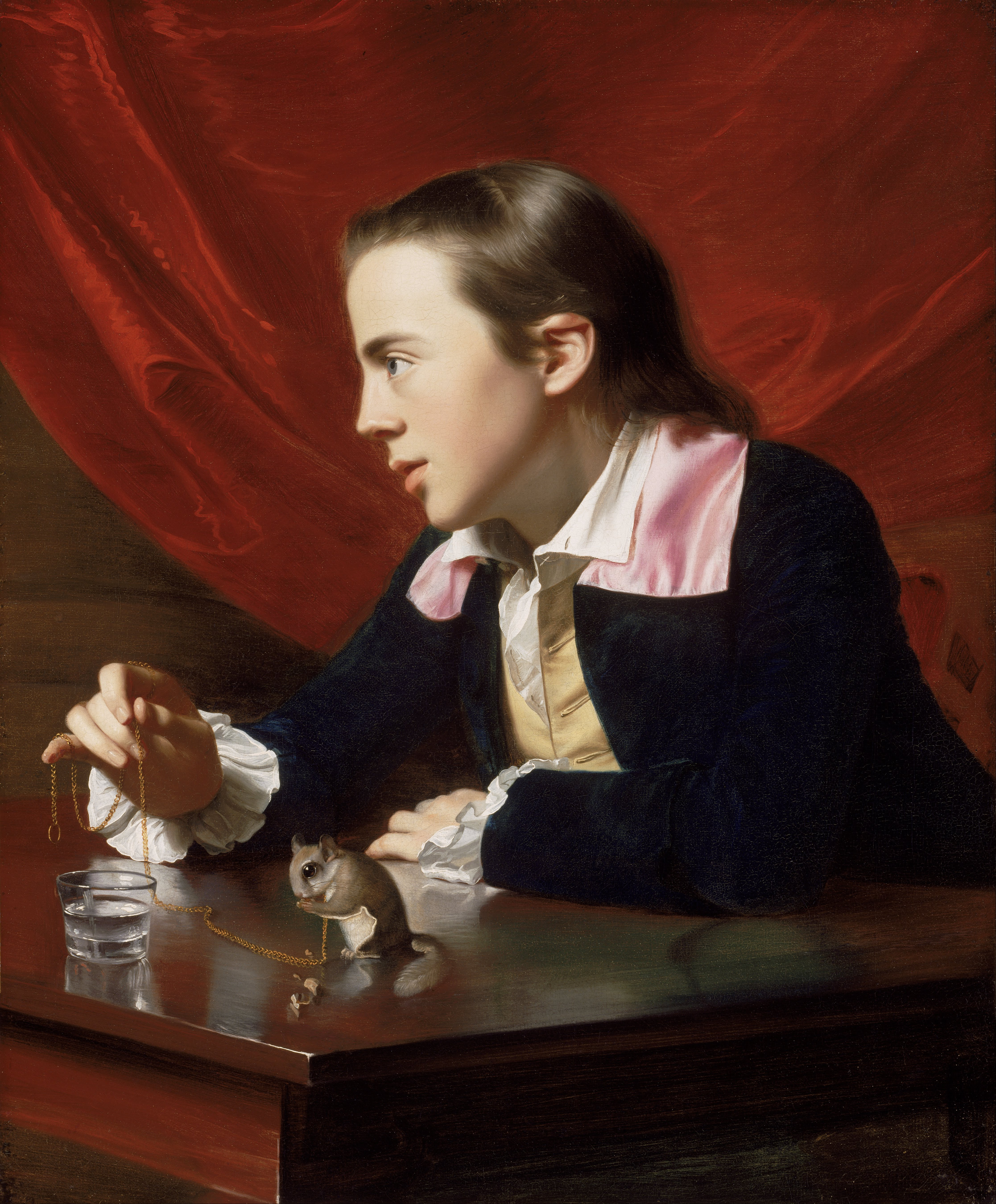
John Singleton Copley, A Boy with a Flying Squirrel (Henry Pelham) (1765)

Mary and Peter Pelham were married at the Trinity Church in Boston on May 22, 1748, becoming Mary Singleton Copley Pelham, also known as Mary Pelham. Peter Pelham was a schoolmaster and an artist. He painted portraits and was a mezzotint engraver. They had a son together, Henry, born February 14, 1749, in Boston. Peter brought a daughter and four sons from his previous wives into the marriage.

John had access to Peter Pelham's collection of prints, books, engraving equipment, and painting supplies as he grew up. He was also an apprentice to his step-father. Peter died in December 1751. Henry studied art under his half-brother John, with whom he was close. Henry then worked in John's studio making portraits and, about 1772, began painting miniature portraits. Pelham supported and nurtured her son's interest in art and was the matriarch of "one of America's earliest art families". John wrote after her death that he benefited from her support. Richard Klayment said that he "wrote glowingly of her kindness, vitality, and importance to his artistic development."

Your fame, my dear son, is sounded by all who are lovers of the art you bid fair to excel in. May God prosper and cause you to succeed in all your undertakings, and enroll your name among the first in your profession.

— Mary Singleton Copley Pelham's letter of her son John Singleton Copley, February 6, 1788.

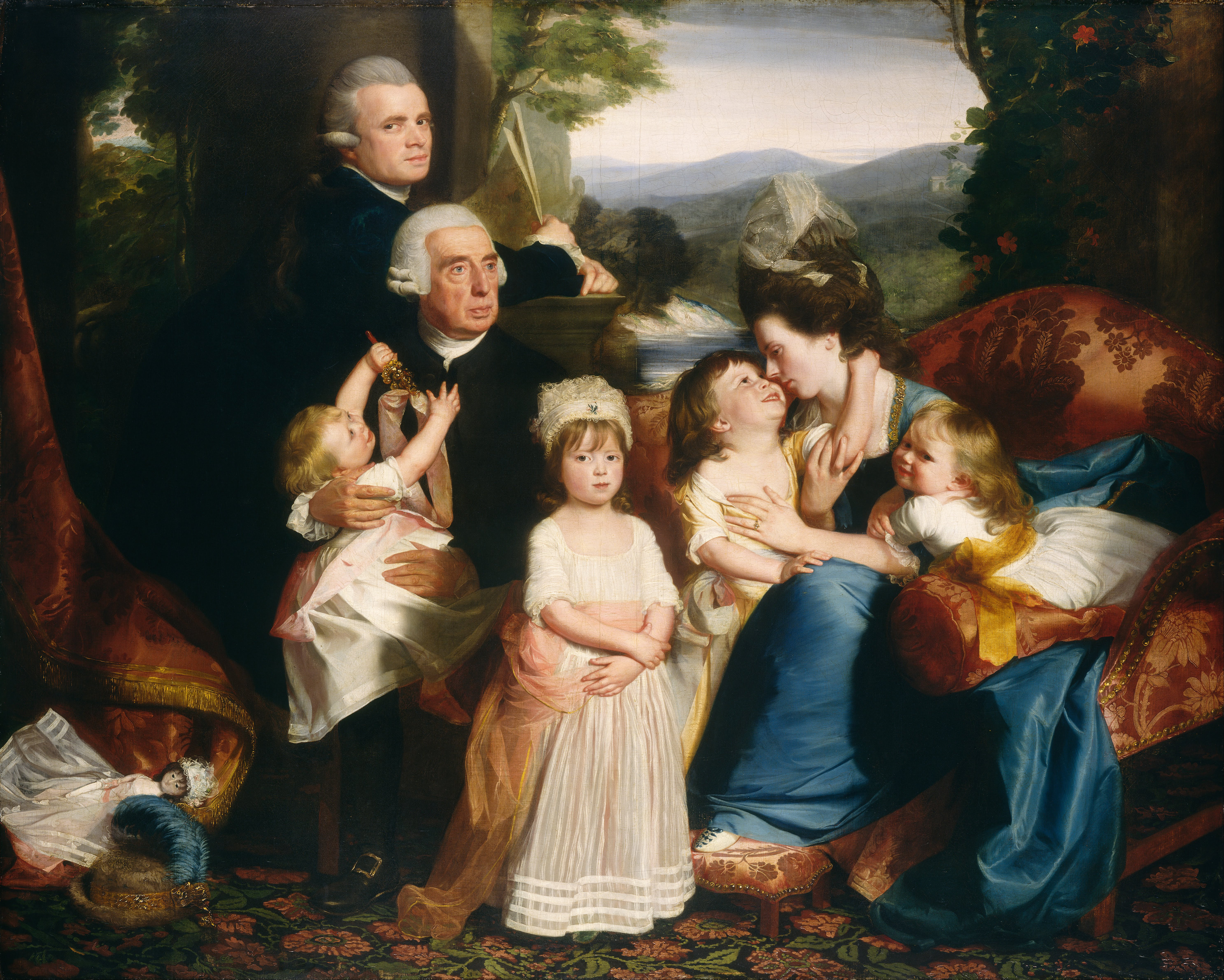
John Singleton Copley, Portrait of the Copley Family (1777)

By 1753, John created a "unique mezzotint" and paintings. He painted portraits of Boston society. John married Susanna Clark, and they started their family. He traveled to Europe and studied in Italy from 1774 to 1775. In 1775, Susanna left Boston at the outbreak of the American Revolutionary War at the Battles of Lexington and Concord. She took three of her children, Elizabeth, John, and Mary, with her to London. Mary Pelham took in her infant grandchild, who died on January 19, 1776, of consumption. The child was age one and a few days. Her son Henry, a loyalist, joined the Copleys in London, leaving Boston in August 1776. Because of his loyalty to the King, Henry's business dropped off, and he became concerned about his safety after a mob of patriots attacked him. Henry succeeded in London and settled in Ireland for the rest of his life. Pelham did not see either John or Henry again.

== Career ==
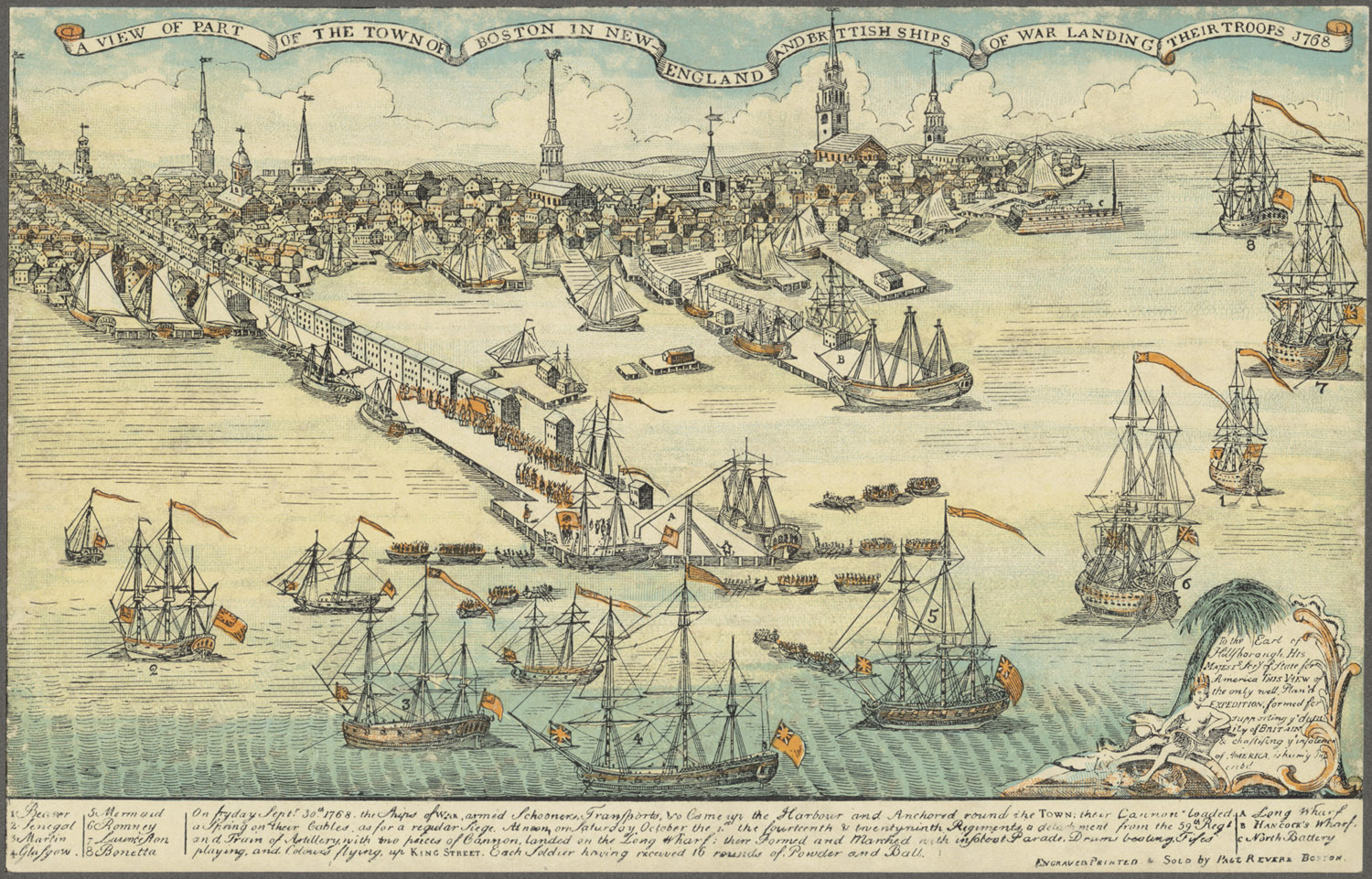
Boston in 1768, with Long Wharf extending into the harbor, engraving by Paul Revere

Pelham ran the retail and wholesale tobacco shop after the death of her husband, Richard Copley. John was likely by his mother's side in the tobacco shop, a floor below their residence. By mid-July 1748, she moved the business to Lindel's Row, near King Street and Mary and John moved into Peter Pelham's house on Lindel's Row. Mary Pelham continued to operate the tobacco business during the Revolutionary War.

Pelham and her husband advertised that they taught arithmetic, reading, writing, and French. They also taught painting on glass, needlework, dancing, and English manners.
