= Peter Pelham =

English painter and engraver

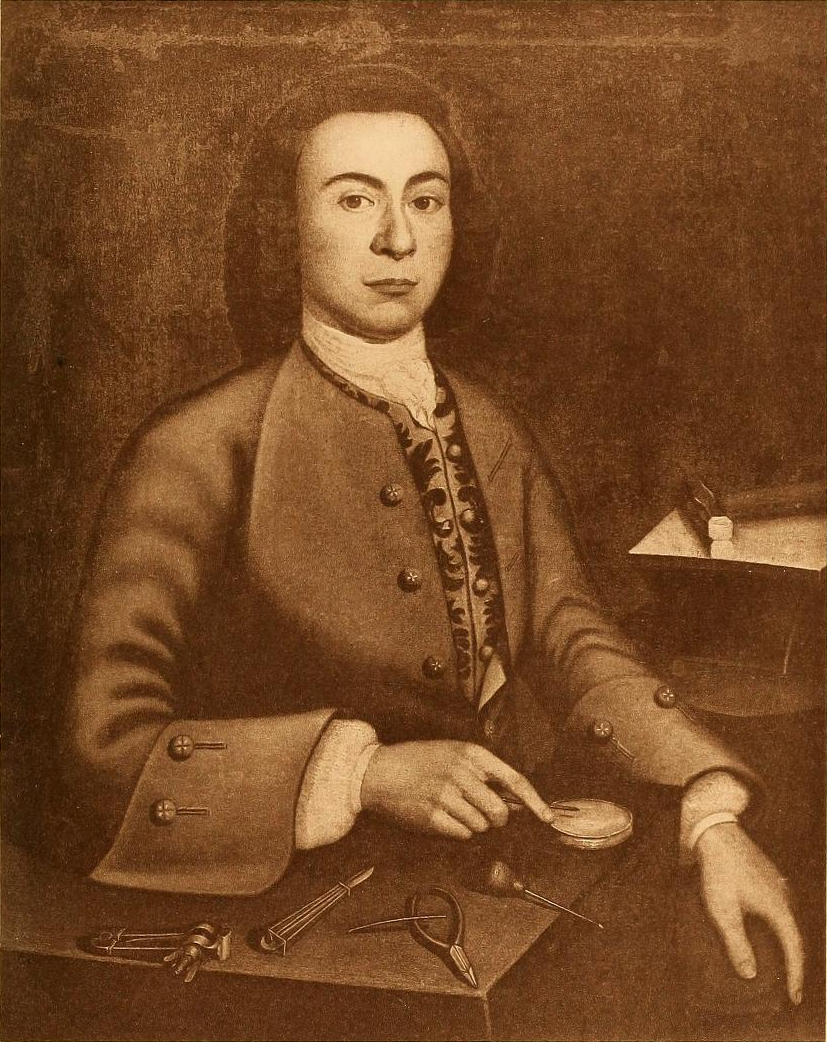
- John Singleton Copley, Peter Pelham (?), c. 1753–1754, private collection
- Born: c. 1695; London, Kingdom of England
- Died: December 1751 (aged 55–56); Boston, Massachusetts, British America
- Education: John Simon
- Known for: Mezzotint portraits
- Spouses: Martha Guy (m. 1719; died 1729) Margaret Lowrey (m. 1734; died 1748) Mary (Singleton) Copley (m. 1748)
- Children: 6, including Henry
- Relatives: John Singleton Copley (stepson)

Signature of Peter Pelham in the below engraving of Mather Byles

Peter Pelham (/ˈpɛləm/; c. 1695 – December 1751) was an American portrait painter and engraver, born in England.

== London ==
Born c. 1695 in London, Pelham was one of several London artists who learned the then new technique of the mezzotint engraving. Of his use of the medium one writer has said: "Pelham handled the rocker heavily, and so gave to his prints a darker appearance than usual". His father, who died in Chichester, Sussex, in 1756, is revealed in letters to his son in America as a man of some property.

He was well trained as a portrait painter, and had influential connections, and between 1720 and 1726 he produced portrait plates of Queen Anne, George I, the Earl of Derby, Lord Wilmington, Lord Carteret, Lord Molesworth, Edmund Gibson, and others. Why, amidst such engagements, Pelham should have emigrated is mysterious, if, as seems quite certain, the poor schoolmaster, limner and engraver of Boston, Massachusetts, is identical with the well-employed mezzotinter of London. It is possible that he left in disgrace. His portrait of Massachusetts Governor Samuel Shute, painted at London in 1724, was brought, according to plausible family tradition, to Boston to serve as introduction to local celebrities.

== Boston ==
Though various dates for his emigration have been suggested, the record of Peter Pelham's activities at Boston is well established. His portrait of the Rev. Cotton Mather, now at the American Antiquarian Society in Worcester, was painted as copy for the very familiar mezzotint engraving, reproduced frequently. "Proposals" for printing this engraving were published in the Boston News-Letter on February 27, 1728. Portraits of several other New England clergymen followed. Pelham was seemingly intimate with John Smibert, who settled in Boston in 1730, for he painted Smibert's portrait and made several engravings after Smibert's works. Such professional labors did not produce a sufficient living for an ever-growing family, and Pelham opened a school at which he taught dancing, arithmetic, and other subjects. His first wife Martha dying in Boston, he married on October 15, 1734, Margaret Lowrey, and after her death he married, on May 22, 1748, Mary (Singleton) Copley, widow of Richard Copley, a recently deceased tobacconist originally from Limerick, Ireland. Their home, school, studio, and tobacco shop were on Queen Street (ca.1747) and Lindall Street. In this household were reared the future artists John Singleton Copley (son of Mary's first husband Richard Copley) and Henry Pelham. Peter Pelham died without a will.

Pelham's descendants included grandson William Pelham (1759-1827), a bookseller in Boston.

== Gallery ==
Selected prints by Peter Pelham
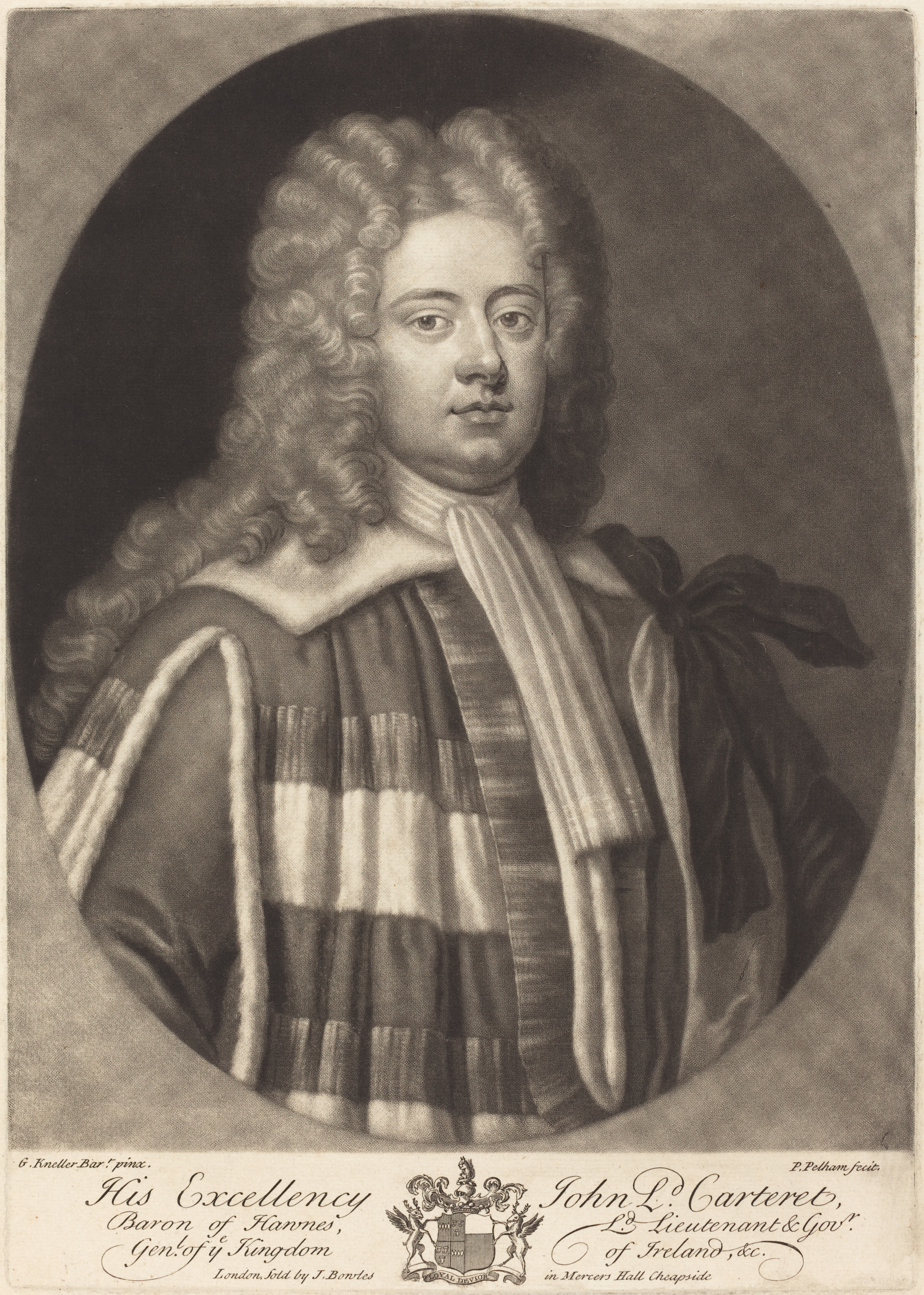
John, Lord Carteret, c. 1720, after Godfrey Kneller, National Gallery of Art, Washington, D.C.

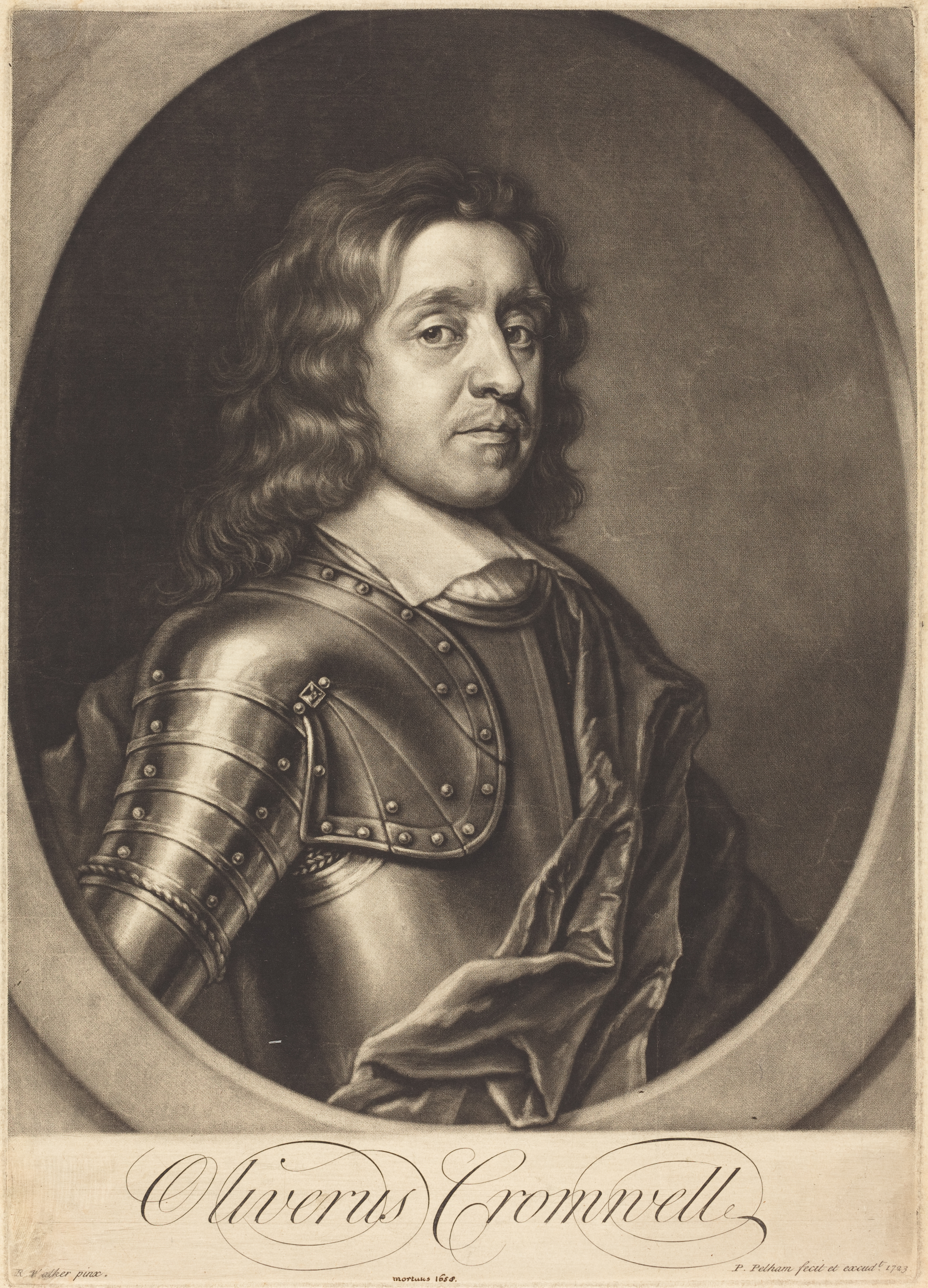
Oliver Cromwell, 1723, after Robert Walker, National Gallery of Art, Washington, D.C.

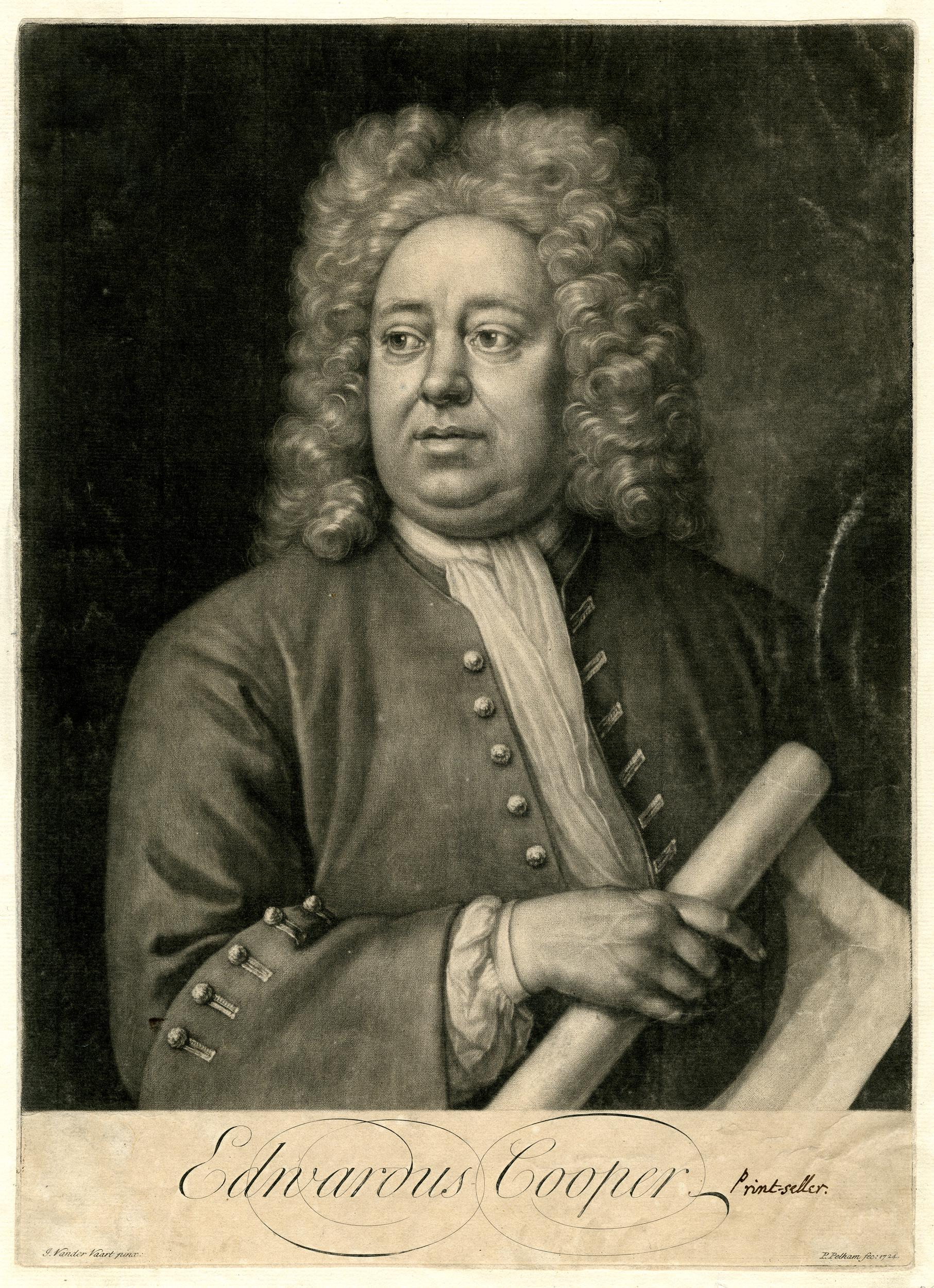
Edward Cooper, 1724, after Jan van der Vaart, British Museum, London

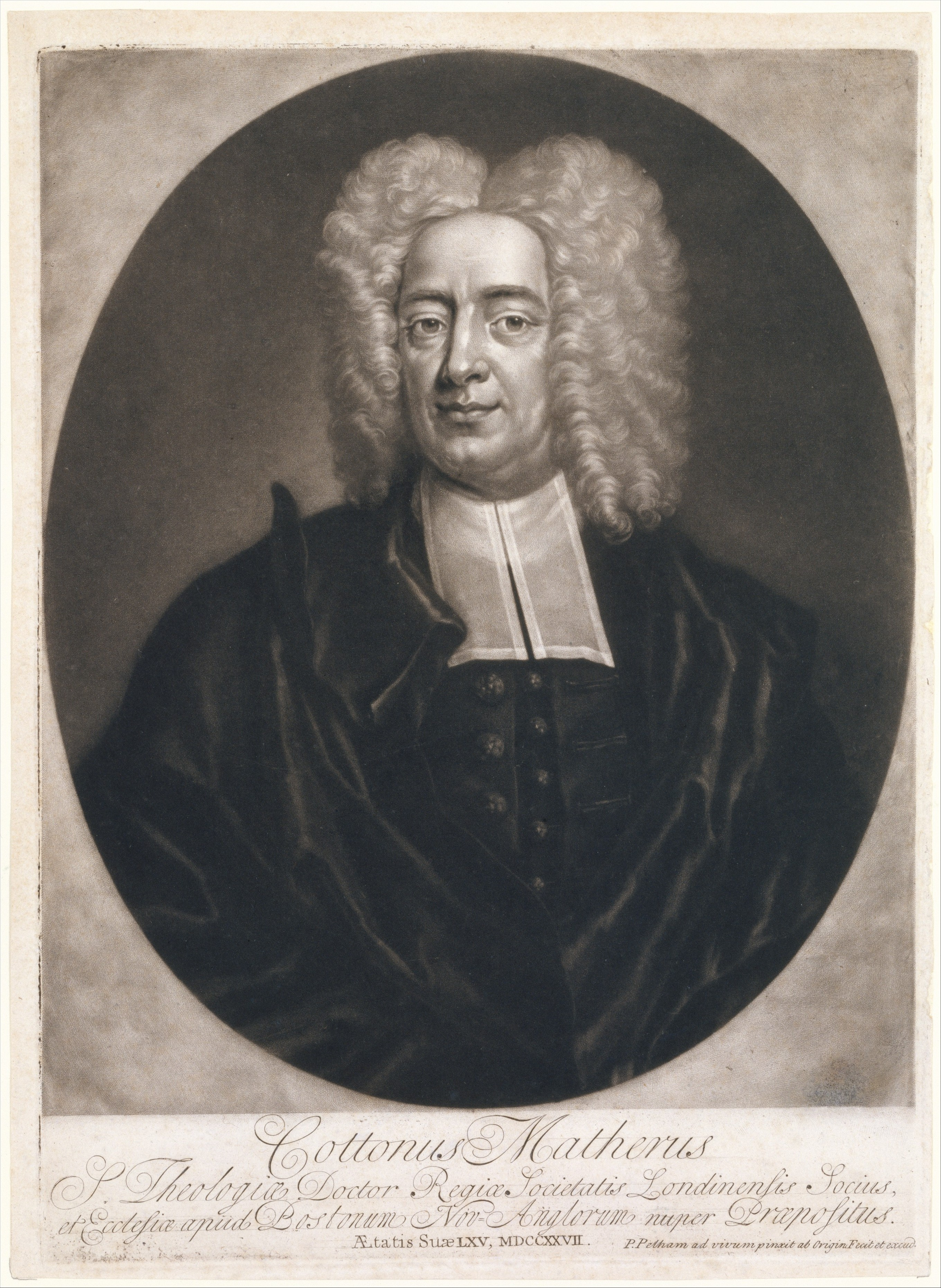
Cotton Mather, c. 1727–1728, Metropolitan Museum of Art, New York City

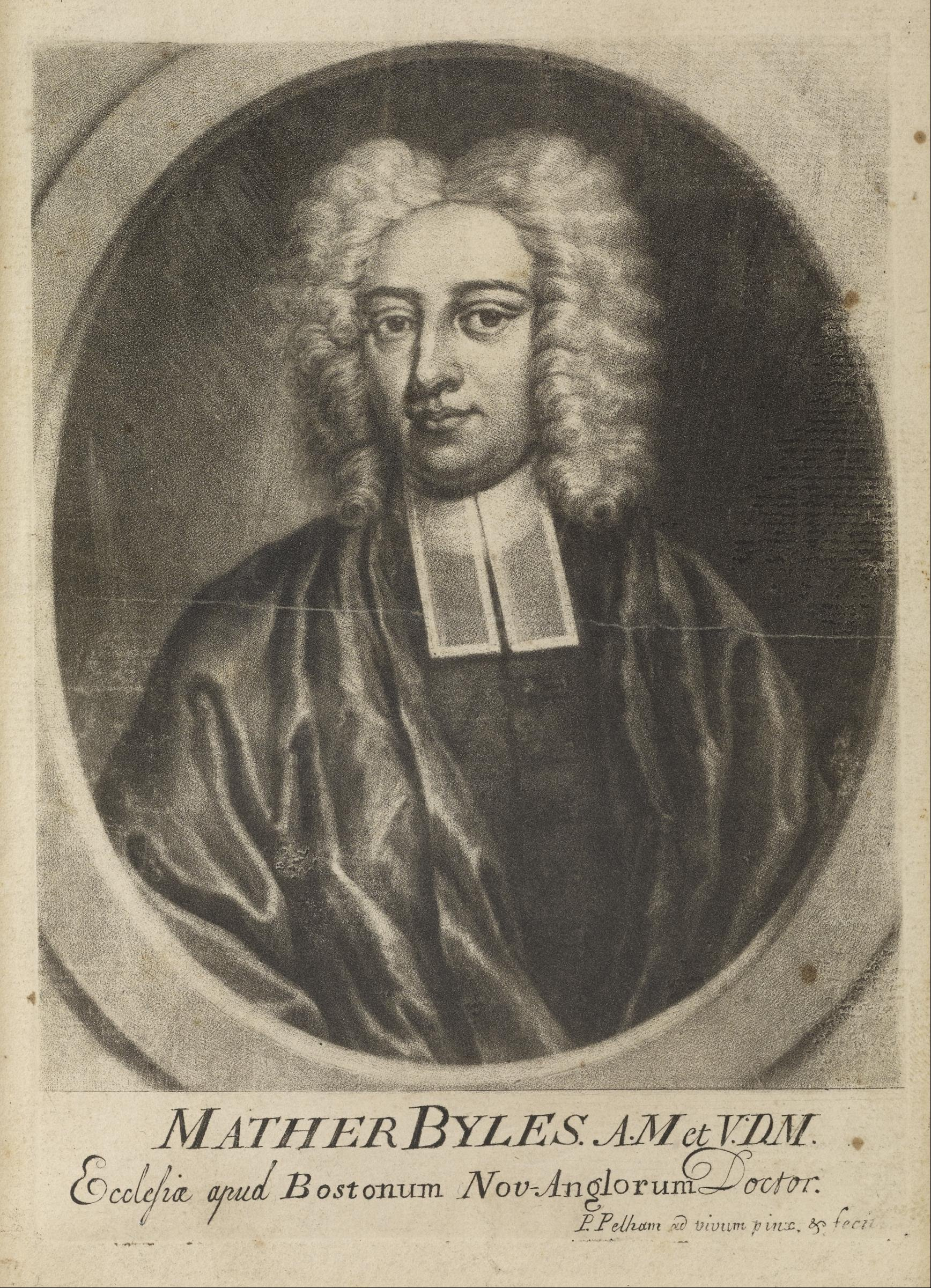
Mather Byles, c. 1732-1739, Museum of Fine Arts, Houston

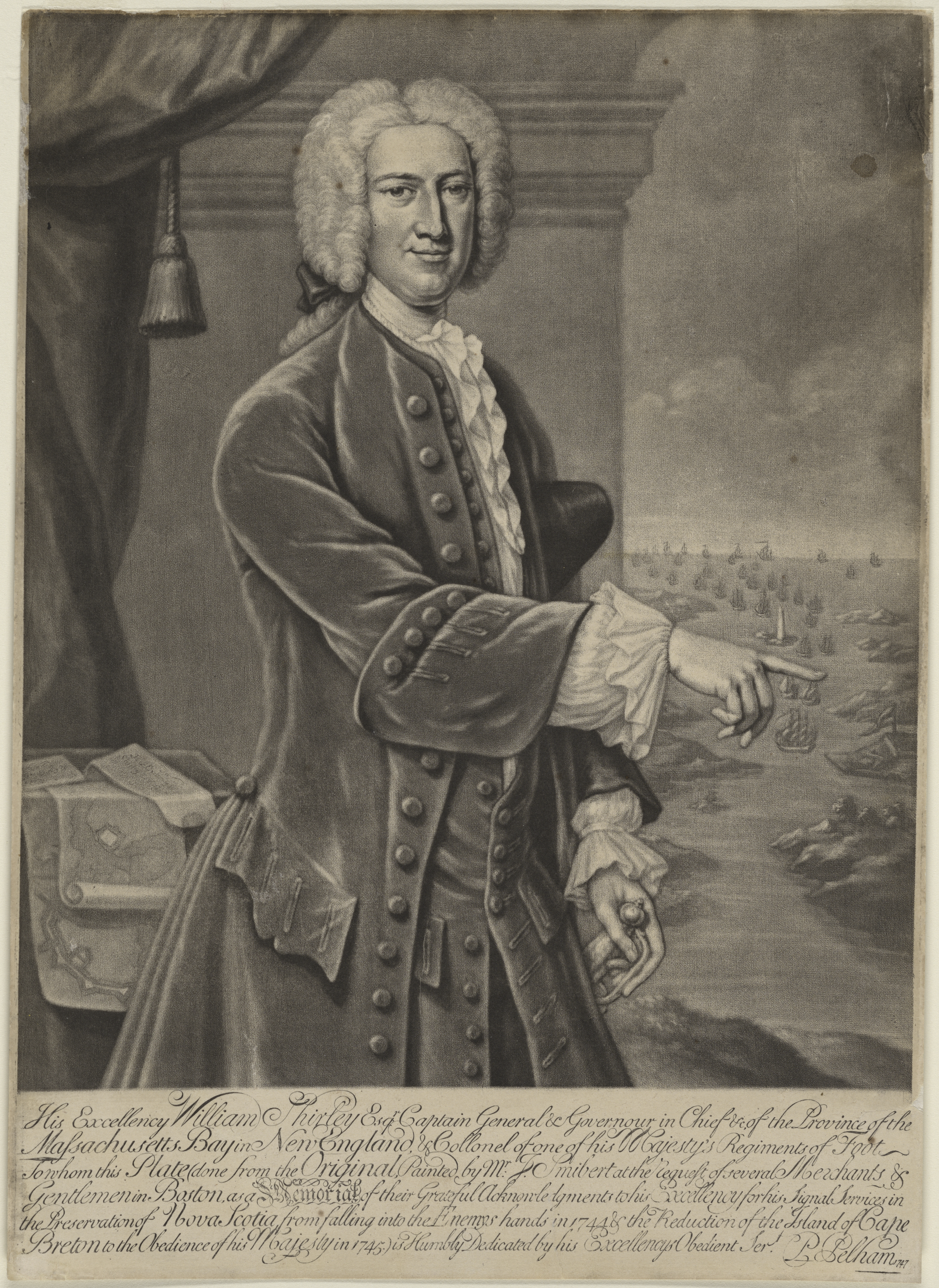
William Shirley, 1747, after John Smibert, National Portrait Gallery, Washington, D.C.
