= Henry Pelham (engraver) =

American painter

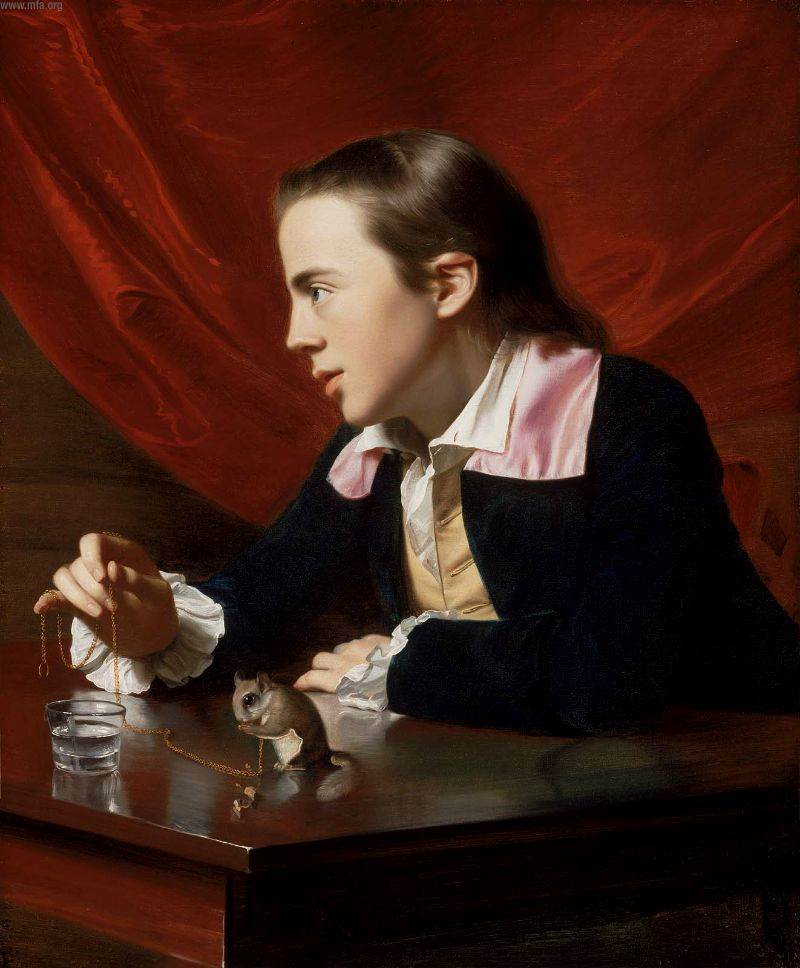
A Boy with a Flying Squirrel, a 1765 portrait of Pelham by his half-brother John Singleton Copley

Henry Pelham (February 14, 1748/49 – 1806) was an American painter, engraver, civil engineer, and cartographer active during the late 18th century. Pelham's many illuminating letters, especially to his half-brother and fellow painter John Singleton Copley, provide an important contemporary perspective of the events of the American Revolution.

Pelham's engraving of the 1770 Boston Massacre, the shooting of several rioters by British soldiers in Boston, was made soon after the event happened. Paul Revere improperly copied Pelham's work and distributed it throughout the thirteen colonies to increase or rouse anger against authorities.

Pelham remained loyal and was harassed for it. He moved to England in 1776.

== Early life and education ==
Pelham was born in Boston in the colonial-era Province of Massachusetts in February 1748. His father, Peter Pelham, was a limner, engraver, and schoolmaster, and his mother Mary (Singleton) Copley, was the widow of Richard Copley and mother of John Singleton Copley. His father died in 1751. A small tobacco shop run by his mother provided support for the family until Copley brought prosperity to them all through his portrait painting. Their home was on Lindall Street, at the present-day intersection of Exchange Place and Congress Street in Boston.

Pelham then attended the Boston Latin School, where he is believed to have studied drawing and painting with his half-brother. A likeness of Pelham, then aged fifteen or sixteen, is featured in A Boy with a Flying Squirrel, a painting that was exhibited in London in 1766 and brought Copley his first fame abroad.

== Career ==
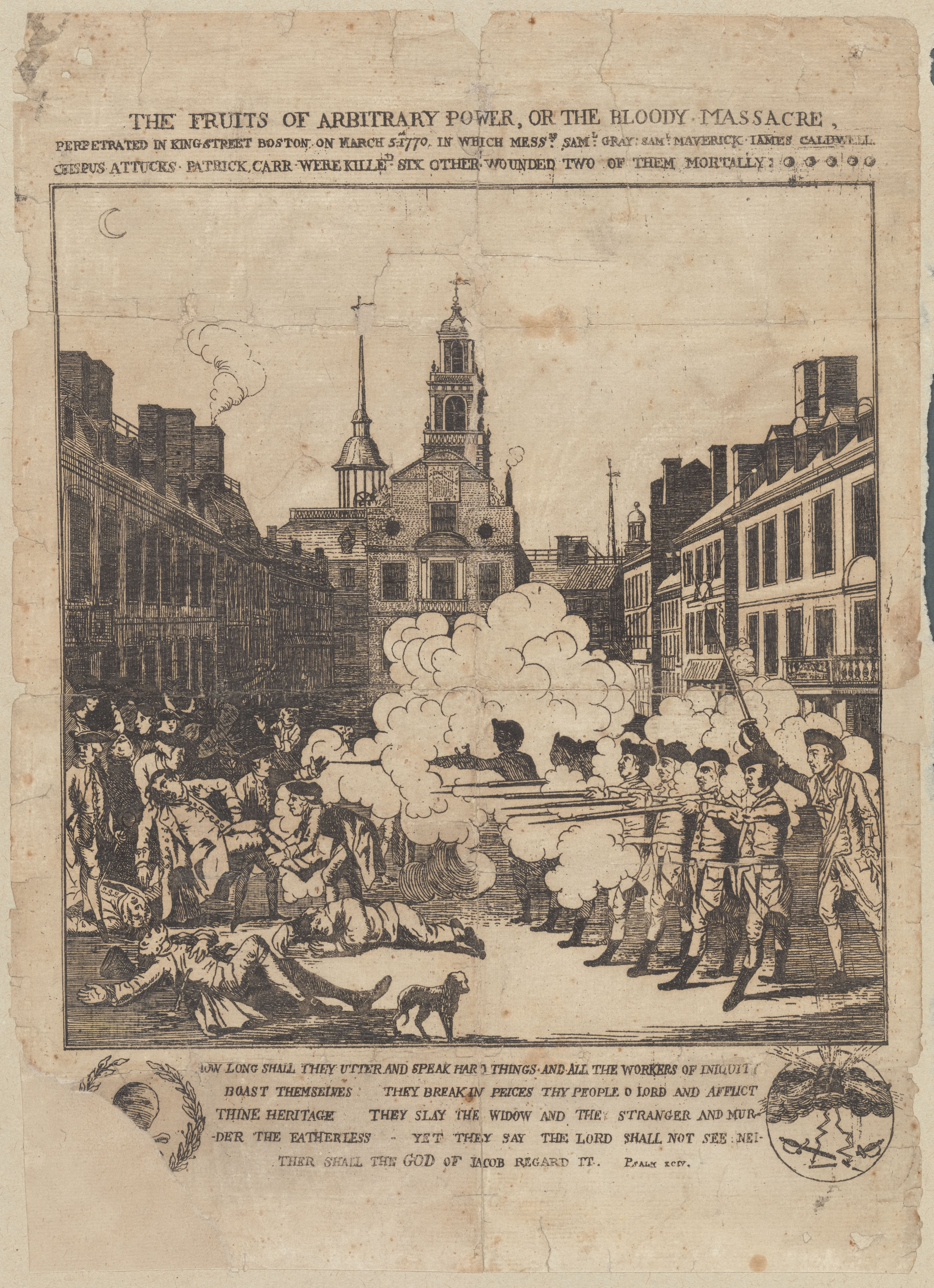
Pelham's 1770 engraving The Fruits of Arbitrary Power, or The Bloody Massacre, an engraving depicting the Boston Massacre that was copied and sold by Paul Revere

In 1770, Pelham's engravement, The Fruits of Arbitrary Power, or The Bloody Massacre, depicted the Boston Massacre of March 5, 1770. He lent a copy to Paul Revere, who copied it and produced his own engraving from it. Because Revere's version was advertised for sale three weeks after the massacre and a week before Pelham's version went on sale, and because it failed to credit him, Pelham felt that Revere had taken advantage of him.

A much more ardent Loyalist than Copley, Pelham expressed himself vigorously against his Patriot neighbors, whom he held to be misguided and rebellious. In the winter of 1775, while making a journey on horseback to Philadelphia, a mob attacked him in Springfield, Massachusetts, as one of "a damn'd pack of Torys." His sketch of the redoubts on Bunker Hill is reproduced with the Copley-Pelham letters. His Plan of Boston was engraved in aquatint in London in 1777.

Along with other Loyalists, Pelham left Boston for London in August 1776, just following the issuance of the Declaration of Independence by the Second Continental Congress in Philadelphia, which formalized and escalated the American Revolutionary War.

In London, Pelham supported himself by teaching drawing, perspective, geography, and astronomy. In 1777, he contributed to the Royal Academy The Finding of Moses, which was engraved by W. Ward in 1787. The following year he exhibited some enamels and miniatures. Having married Catherine Butler, daughter of William Butler of Castle Crine in County Clare, Ireland, Pelham subsequently went to Ireland. His wife, however, died while bearing twin sons, Peter and William, and Pelham returned with them to London.

He and Copley shared in the estate of their mother, who died in Boston on April 29, 1789. Soon after, Pelham was named agent for Lord Lansdowne's Irish estates, a work which he pursued with energy and ability. He became a civil engineer and cartographer, and his county and baronial maps are considered important documents of Irish history.

== Death ==
In 1806, Pelham drowned after falling from a boat while superintending the erection of a martello tower on a river in Kenmare.
