= Jan van der Vaart (painter) =

Dutch painter

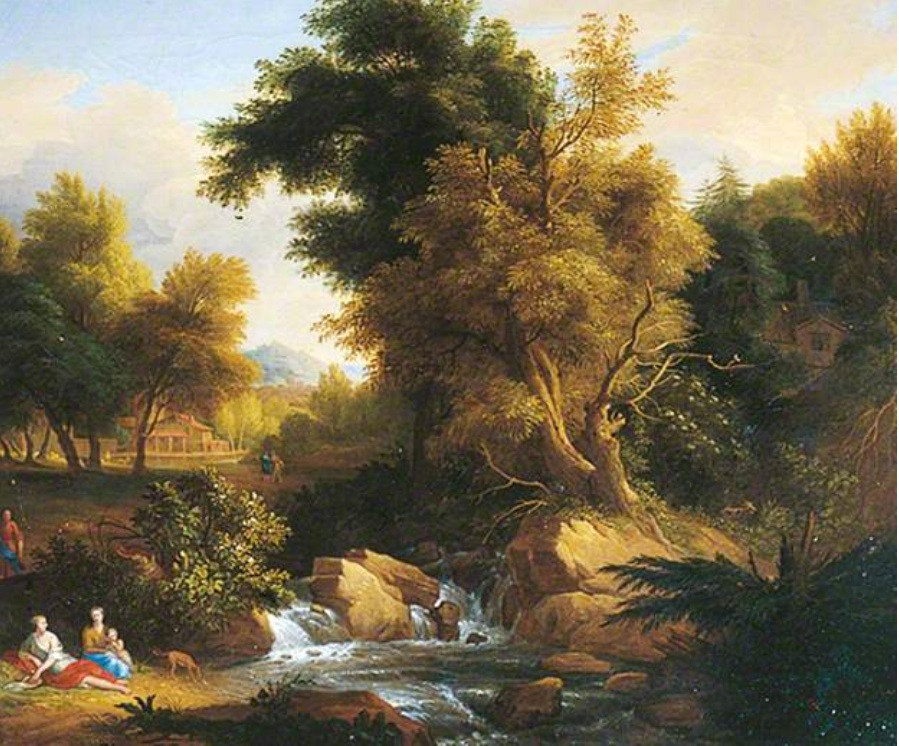
Wooded landscape with trees and figures

Jan van der Vaart or Jan van der Vaardt (name variations: John Van der Vaart, John Vander Vaart, Jan van der Waart) (c.1650 –1727) was a Dutch painter and draughtsman of portraits, landscapes and trompe-l'œil paintings and a mezzotint artist who was active in England for most of his career. He was also an art restorer and art collector.

== Life ==
Van der Vaart was born in Haarlem, where he trained with Thomas Wijck. Van der Vaart is documented from 1674 onwards in London. Here he worked in the workshop of another Dutch immigrant, Willem Wissing, who was a pupil and former collaborator of the court portrait painter Sir Peter Lely. Van der Vaart painted draperies and landscapes in the portraits of Wissing. After Wissing's death in 1687, van der Vaart continued his workshop. He collaborated on occasion with the German-born painter Johann Kerseboom.

In 1713 van der Vaart sold off his collection and built a house in Covent Garden. He stopped painting and confined himself to the restoration of paintings because of his deteriorating eyesight. He died in London, a bachelor, and his nephew Arnold continued his restoration business.

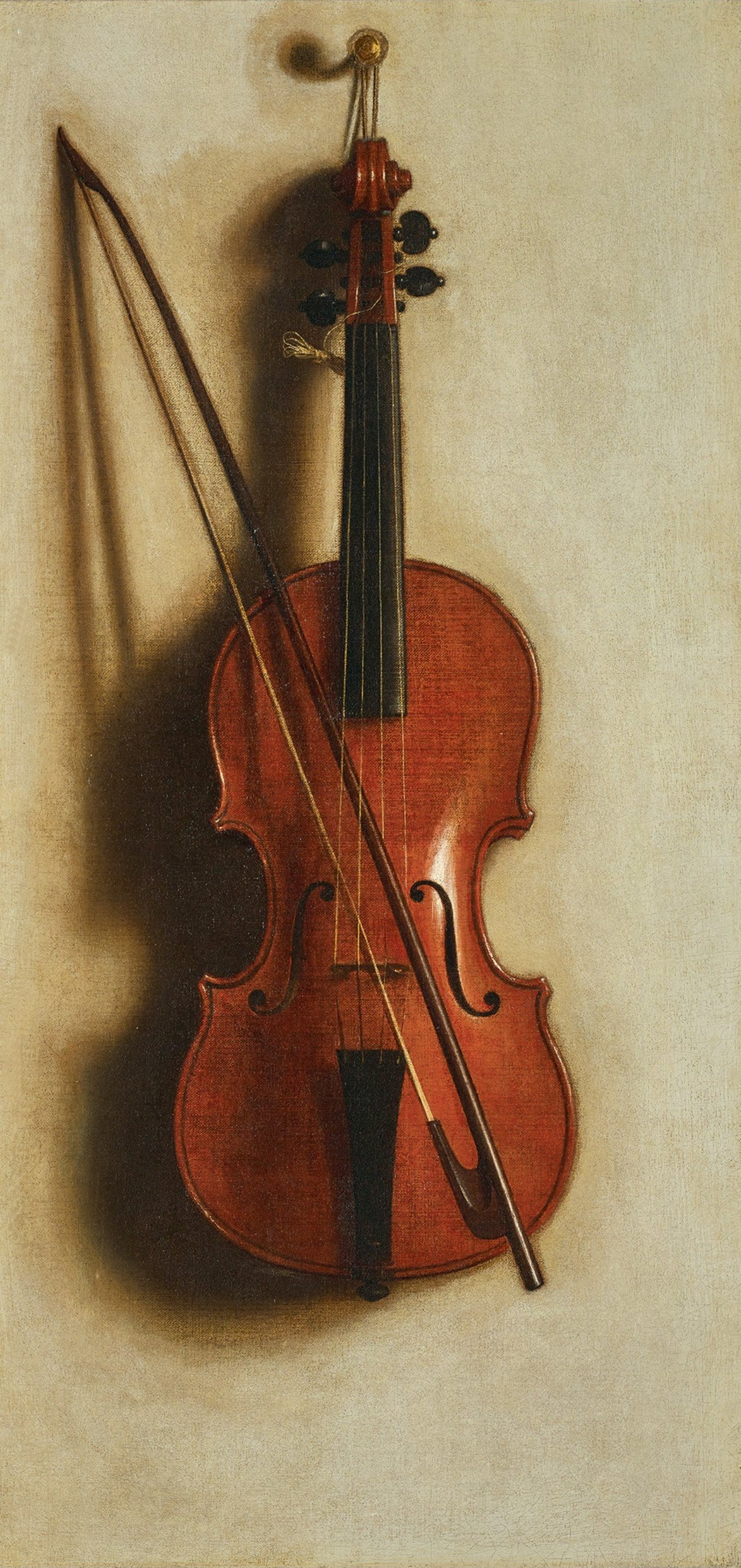
Portrait of a Violin

He was probably the teacher of the famous English mezzotint engraver John Smith (1652–1742).

== Work ==
He was a versatile painter and painted in a wide range of genres including flower still lifes, religious paintings, history paintings, landscapes, portraits and trompe-l'oeil still lives. According to Walpole he painted a trompe l'oeil of a violin on a door at Chatsworth House. He is primarily known for his portraits and landscapes.

A number of van der Vaard's portraits were engraved in mezzotint by Bernard Lens for the print publisher Edward Cooper. Van der Vaart was himself one of the earliest practitioners of mezzotint in England and produced many prints after portraits made by portrait artists like Sir Peter Lely, Willem Wissing etc.
