= Willem Wissing =

Dutch painter

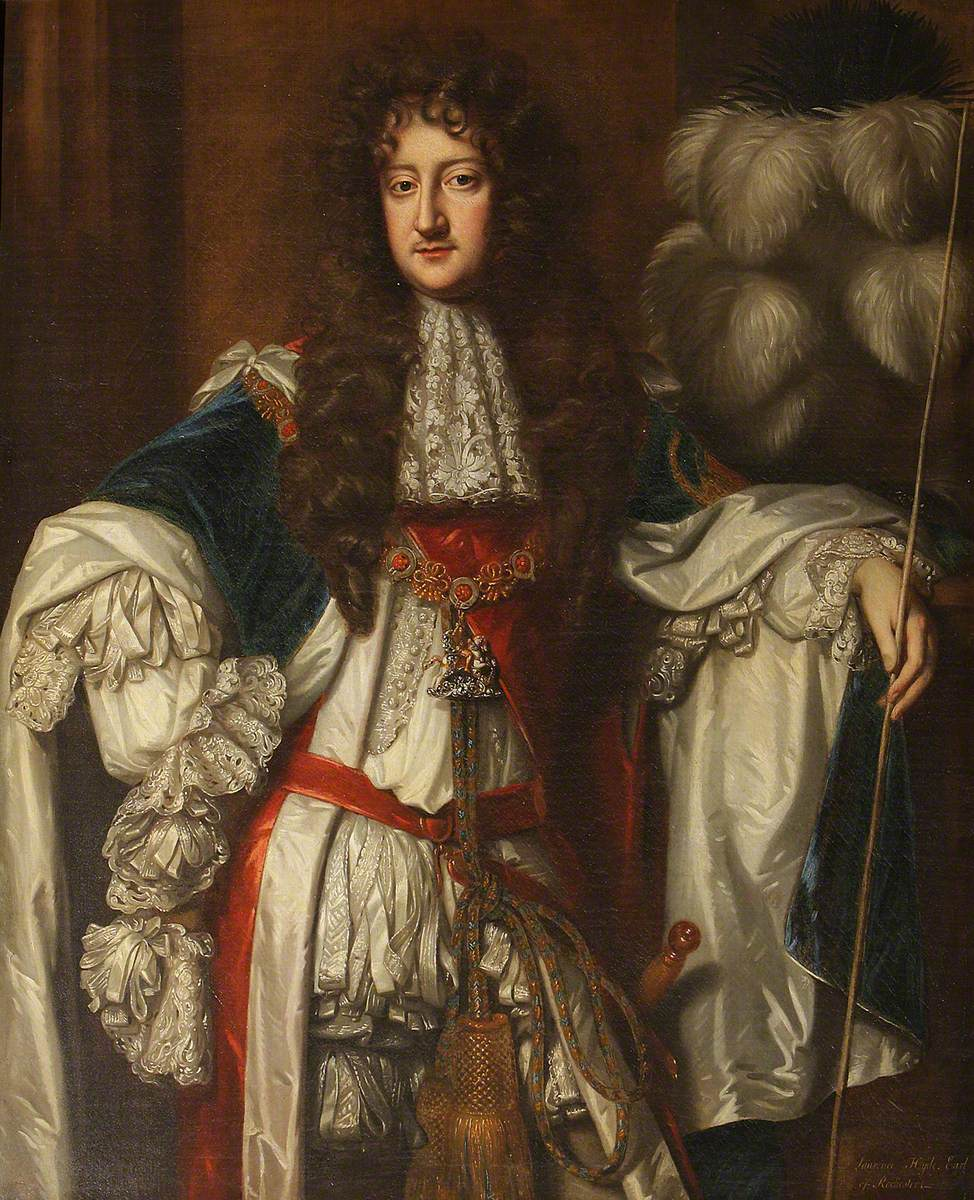
Willem Wissing, Portrait of Laurence Hyde, 1st Earl of Rochester, c. 1685 to 1687, Holburne Museum of Art

Willem Wissing, known in England as William Wissing (1656 – 10 September 1687), was a Dutch portrait artist who worked in England.

== Biography ==
He was born in either Amsterdam or The Hague, and studied at The Hague under Willem Doudijns (1630–97) and Arnoldus van Ravestyn (1615–90). In 1676, he moved to England, where he studied with and assisted Peter Lely. After Lely's death in 1680, Wissing emerged as his most important pupil. Godfrey Kneller was the only contemporary portrait artist in England to rival Wissing. Wissing's royal sitters include Charles II of England, Catherine of Braganza, George of Denmark and James Scott, 1st Duke of Monmouth.

In 1685, James II of England sent Wissing to the Netherlands to paint portraits of his Dutch son-in-law and daughter, the future William III of England and the future Mary II of England. The portraits were often repeated; versions are on display in the Great Hall of the Wren building at the College of William and Mary in Williamsburg, Virginia. Wissing died in 1687 at the peak of his fame as a portrait painter, at Burghley House, the home of John Cecil, 5th Earl of Exeter near Stamford in Lincolnshire. Some suspected he was poisoned out of jealousy of his success. According to Arnold Houbraken his epitaph was Immodicis brevis est aetas, meaning Brief is the life of the outstanding. He was buried in St Martin's Church, Stamford, Lincolnshire.

Fellow Dutch immigrant Jan van der Vaart worked in his workshop and added the draperies and landscapes in the portraits painted by Wissing. After Wissing's death in 1687, van der Vaart continued Wissing's workshop.

Many of Wissing's portraits of prominent sitters and his self-portrait were disseminated in mezzotint.

== Gallery ==
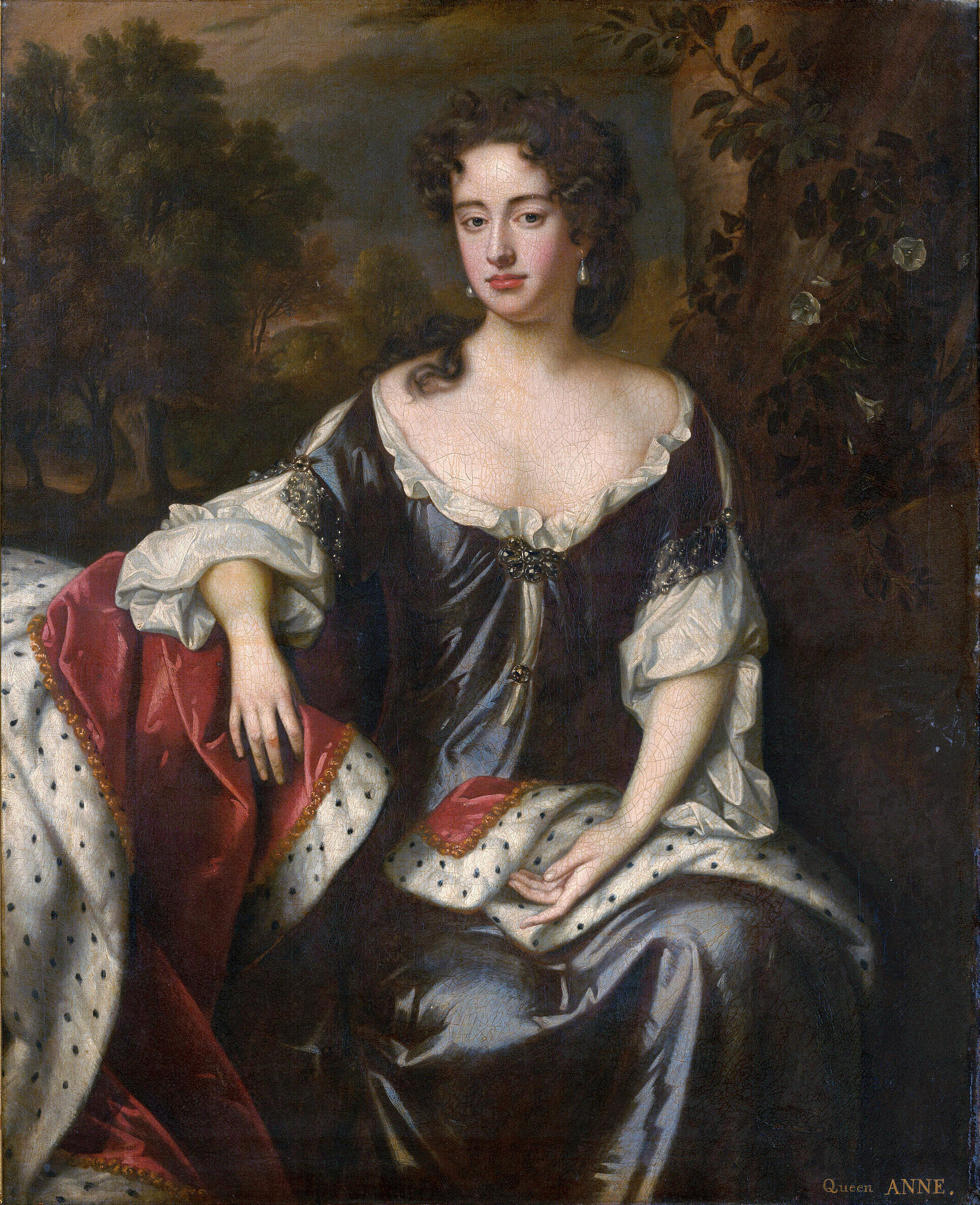
Portrait of Queen Anne (private collection)

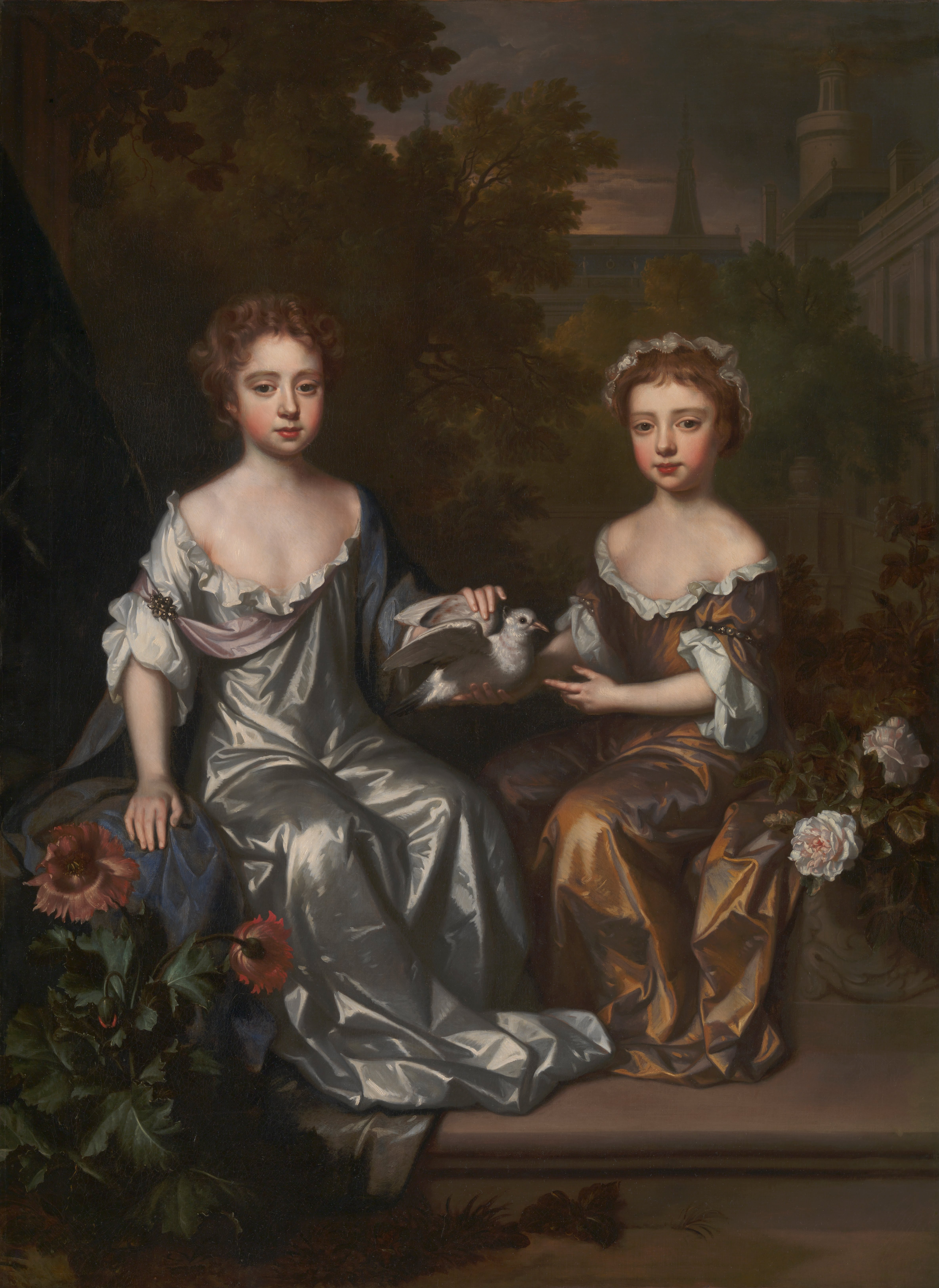
Portrait of Henrietta and Mary Hyde. c. 1683

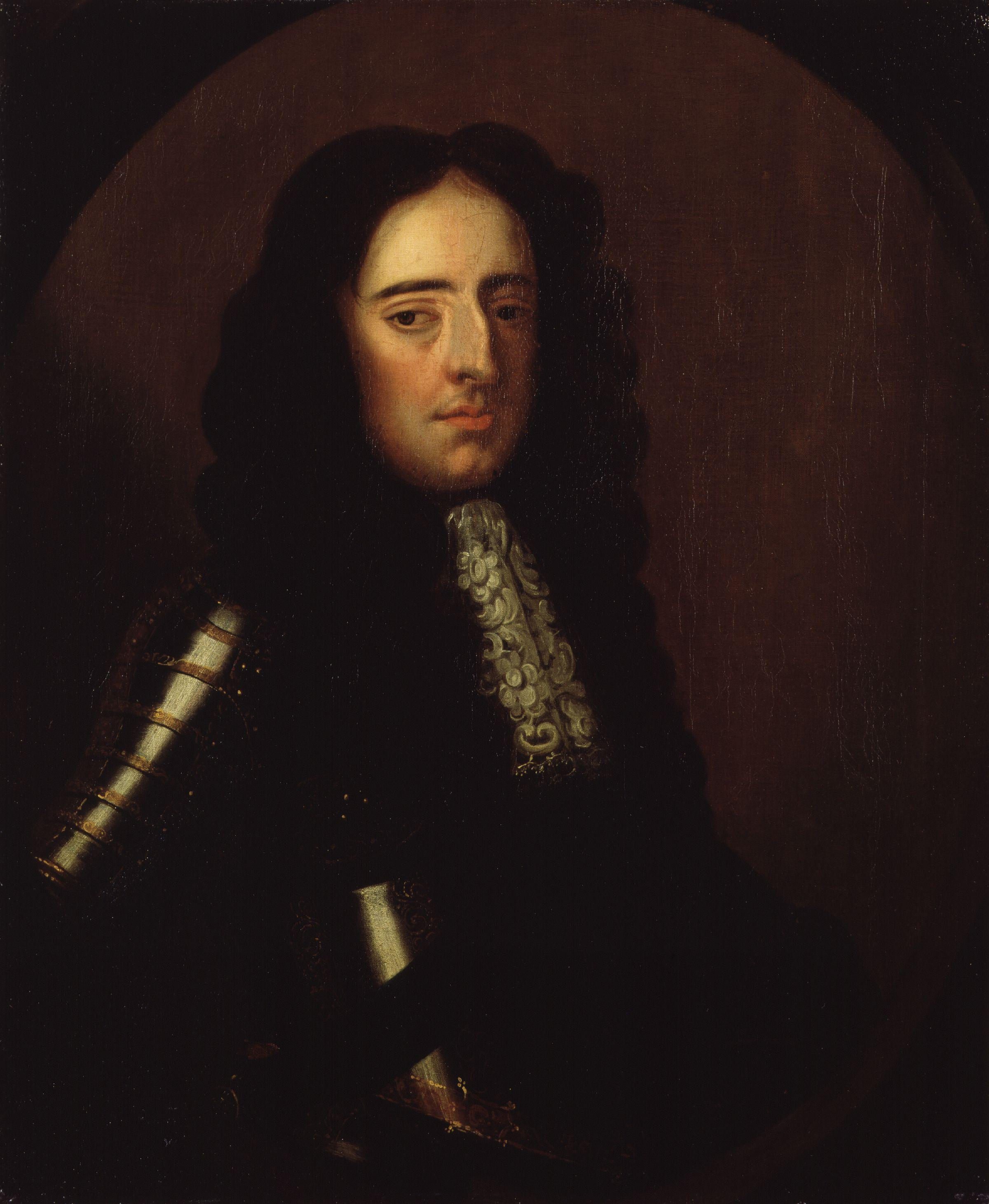
Portrait of William III when Prince of Orange (National Portrait Gallery, London)

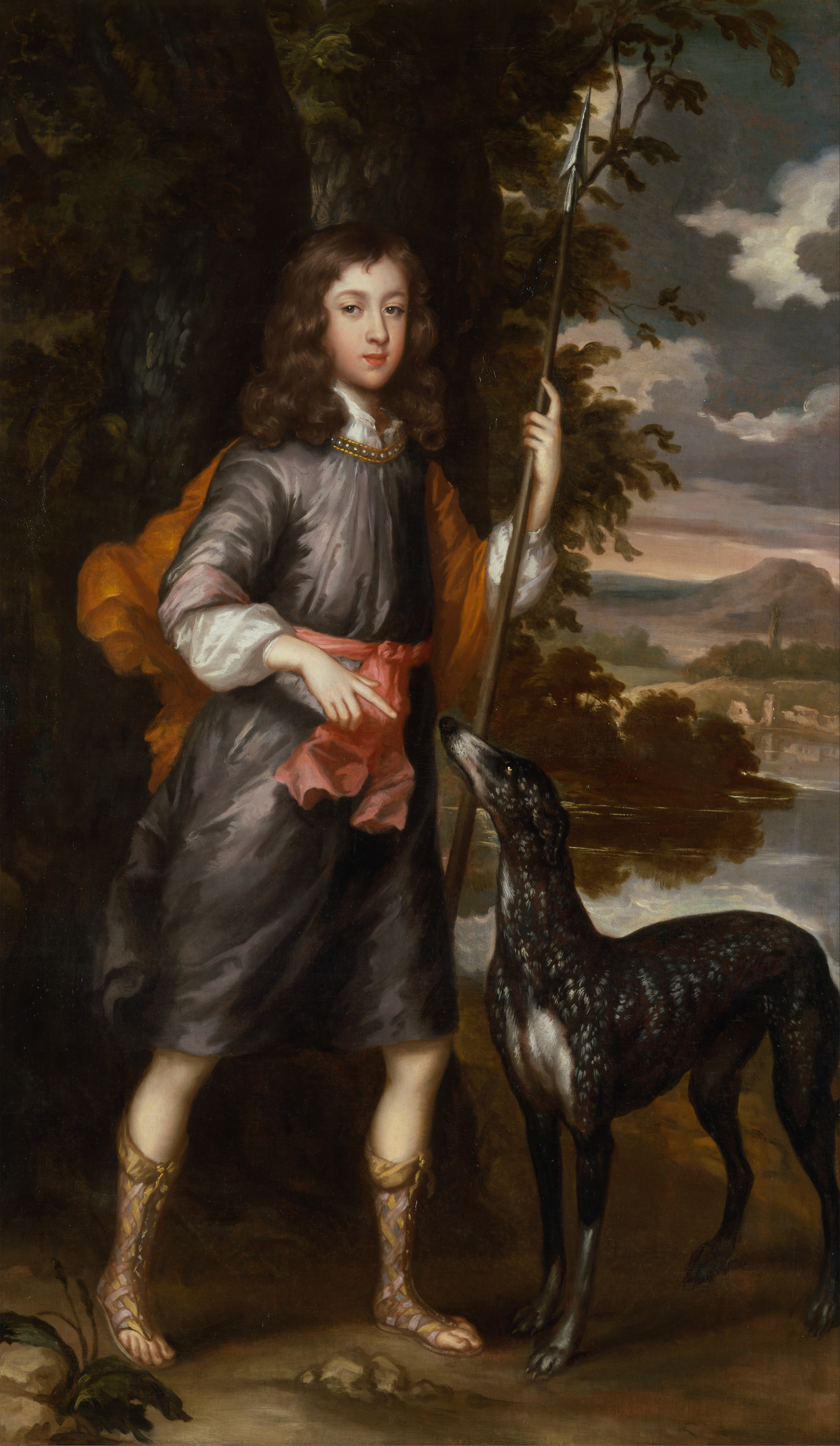
Portrait of a Boy with Dog attrib. to Wissing (Yale Center for British Art)

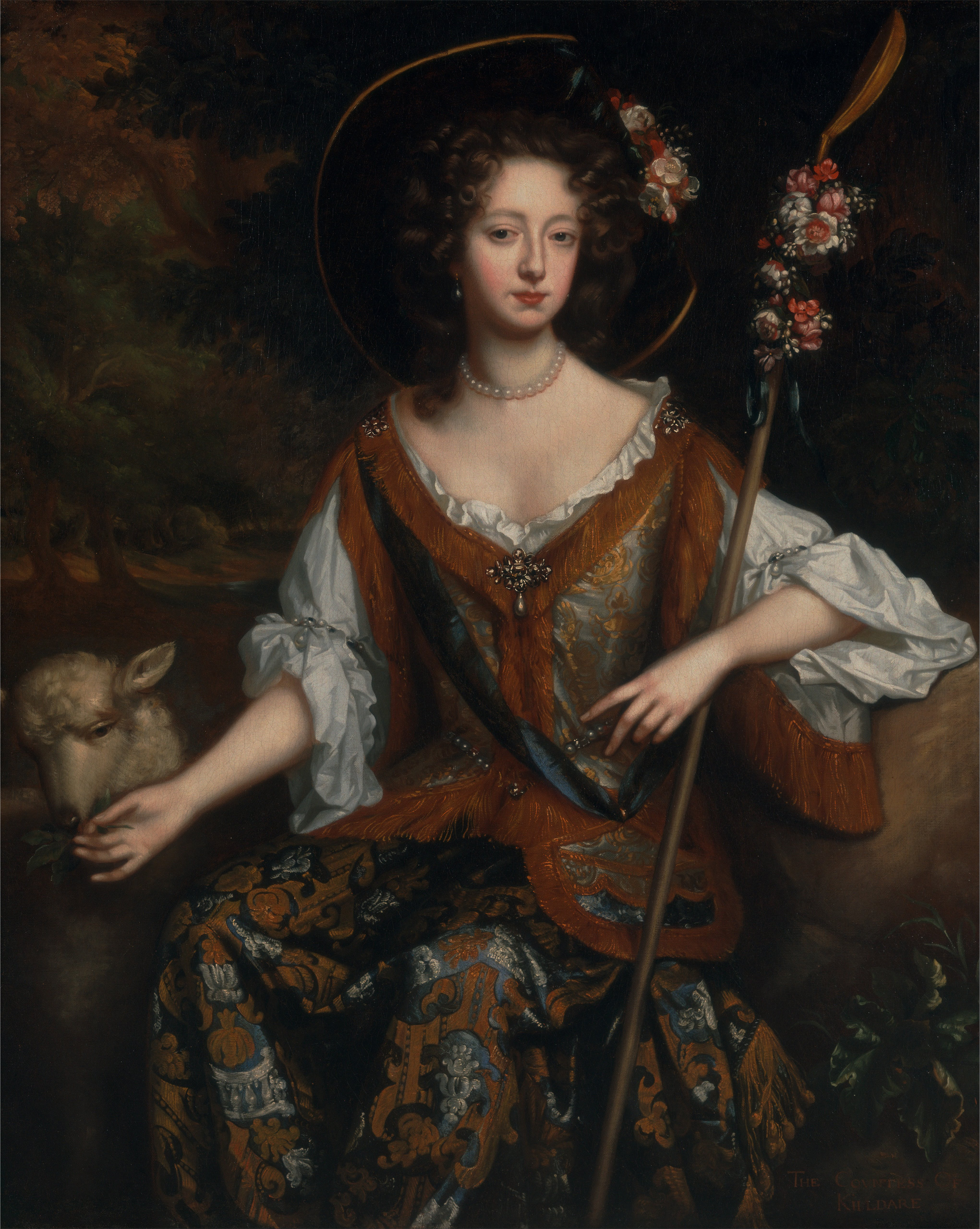
Portrait of Elizabeth Jones, Countess of Kildare, attrib. to Wissing c. 1684 (Yale Center for British Art)

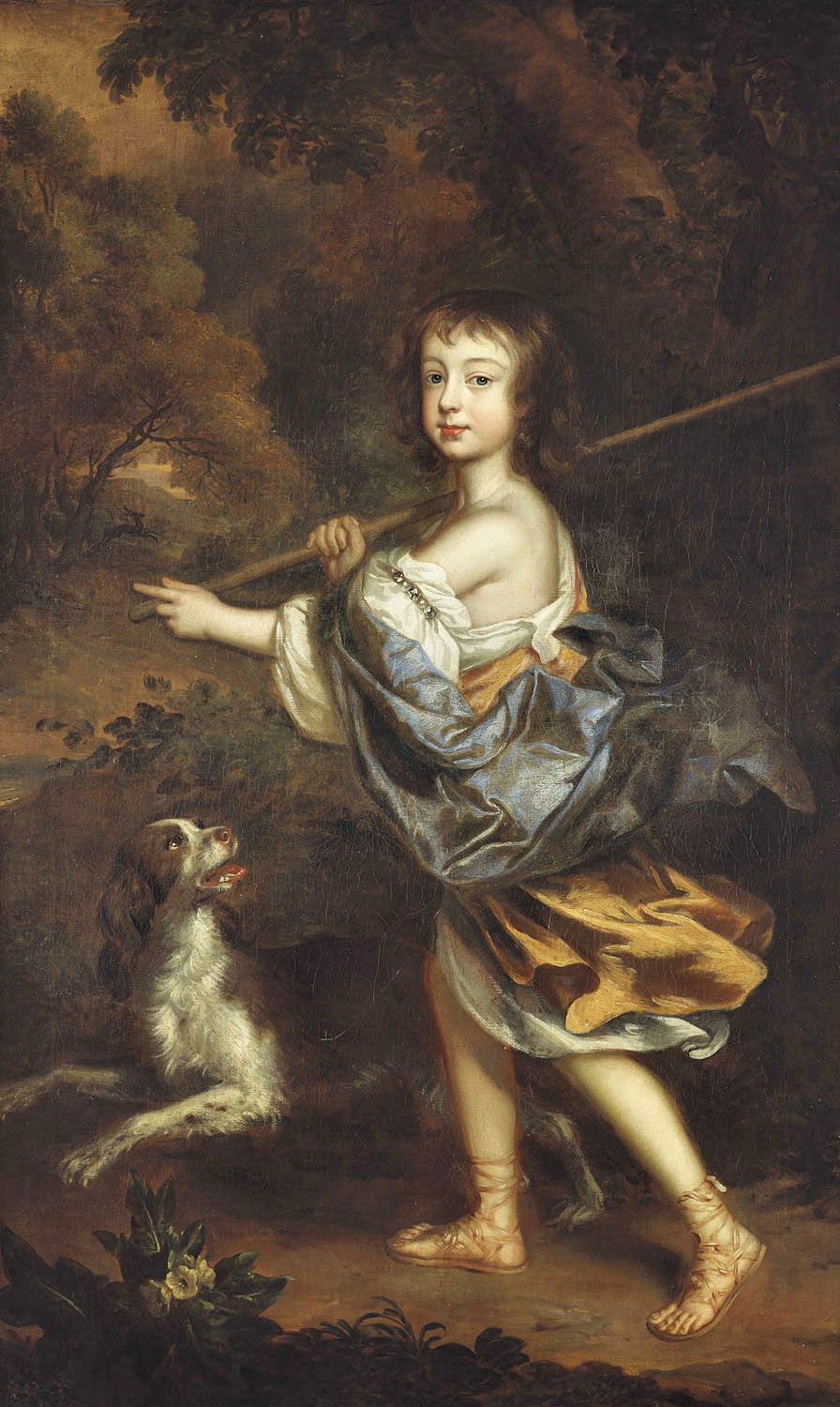
Posthumous Portrait of James Stuart, Duke of Cambridge, 1676-87 (Royal Collection)

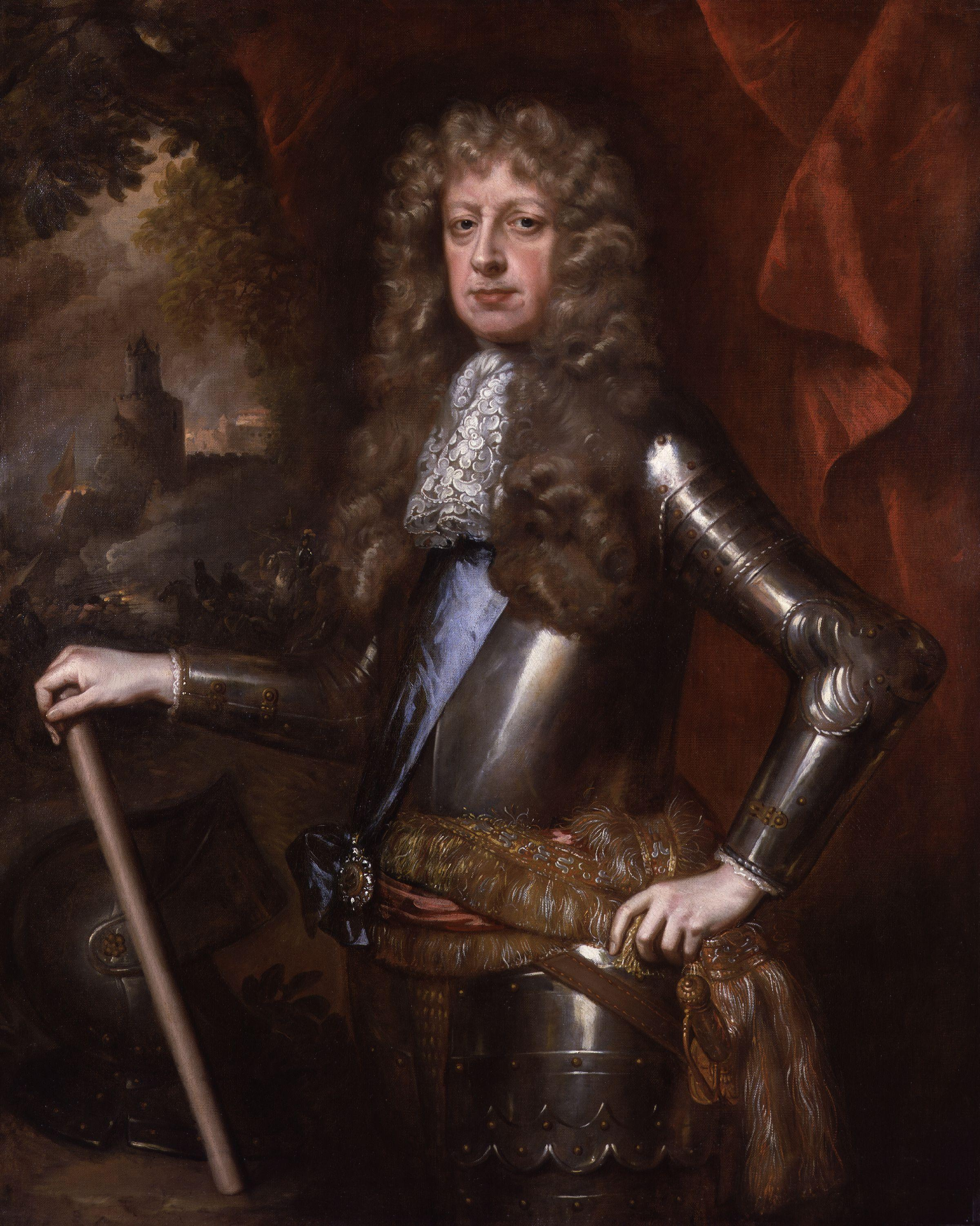
Portrait of James Butler, 1st Duke of Ormonde

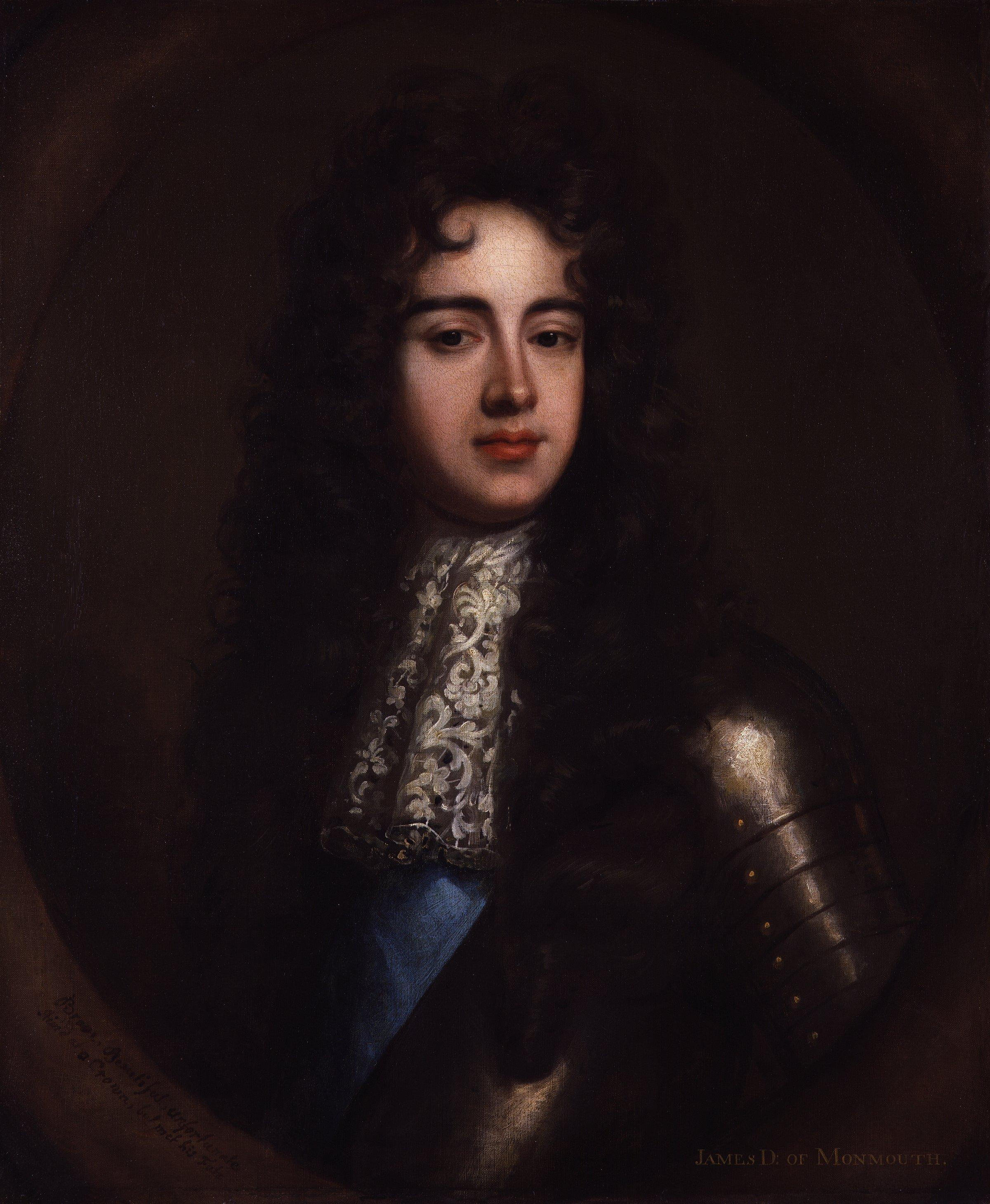
Portrait of James Scott, Duke of Monmouth and Buccleuch (National Portrait Gallery, London)

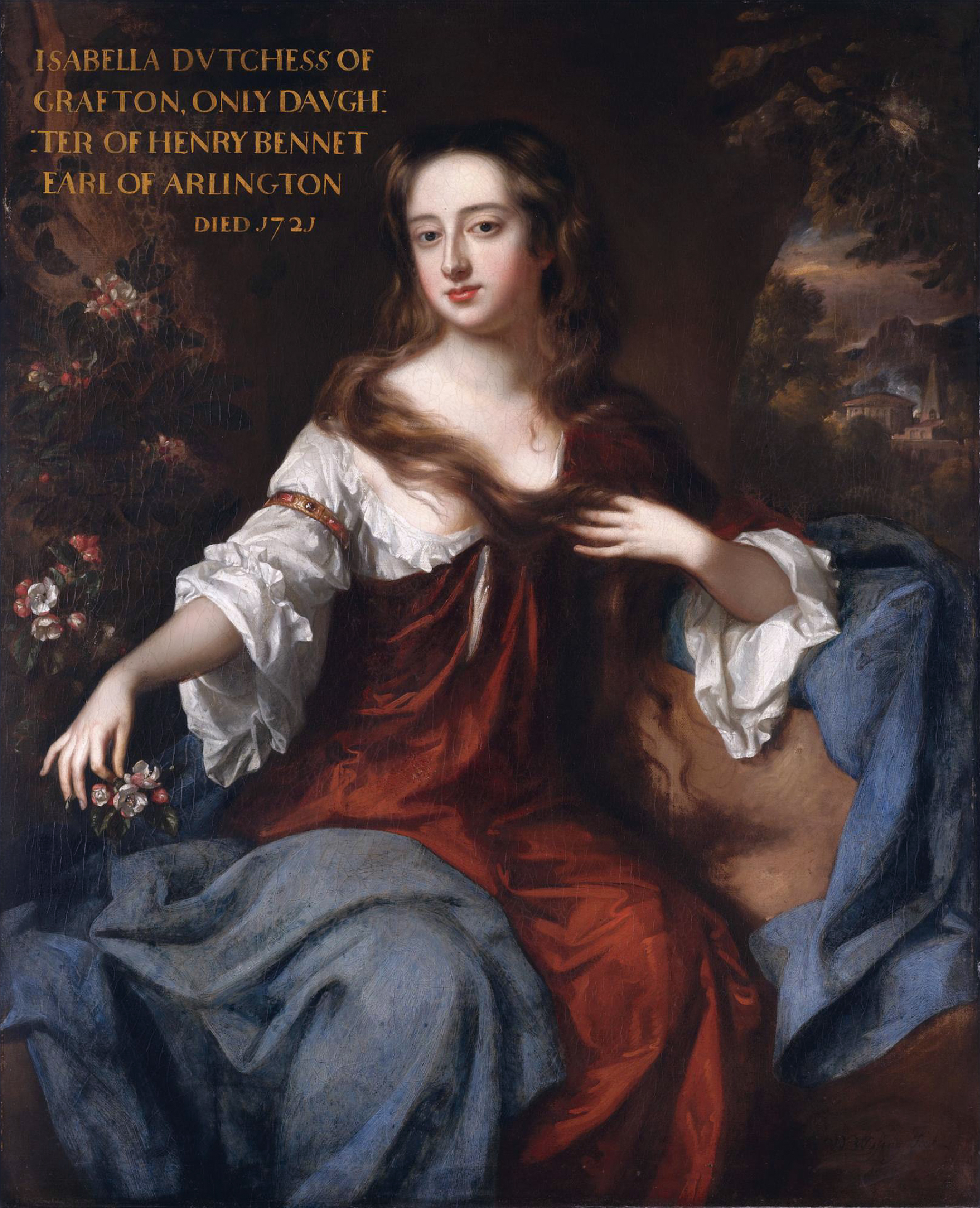
Portrait of Isabella, Duchess of Grafton (Sotheby's)

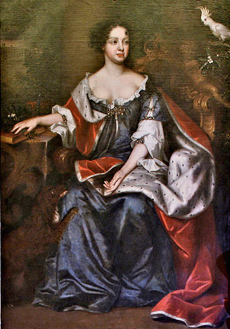
Portrait of Catherine of Braganza, Queen of England (Necessidades Palace, Lisbon)
