= 1632 in art =

Events from year 1632 in art.

== Events ==
- July - Portraitist Anthony van Dyck, newly returned to London, is knighted and granted a pension as principalle Paynter in ordinary to their majesties.
- Construction of the Taj Mahal mausoleum begins at Agra in India, probably to a design by Ustad Ahmad Lahauri. It will continue until 1653.

== Works ==
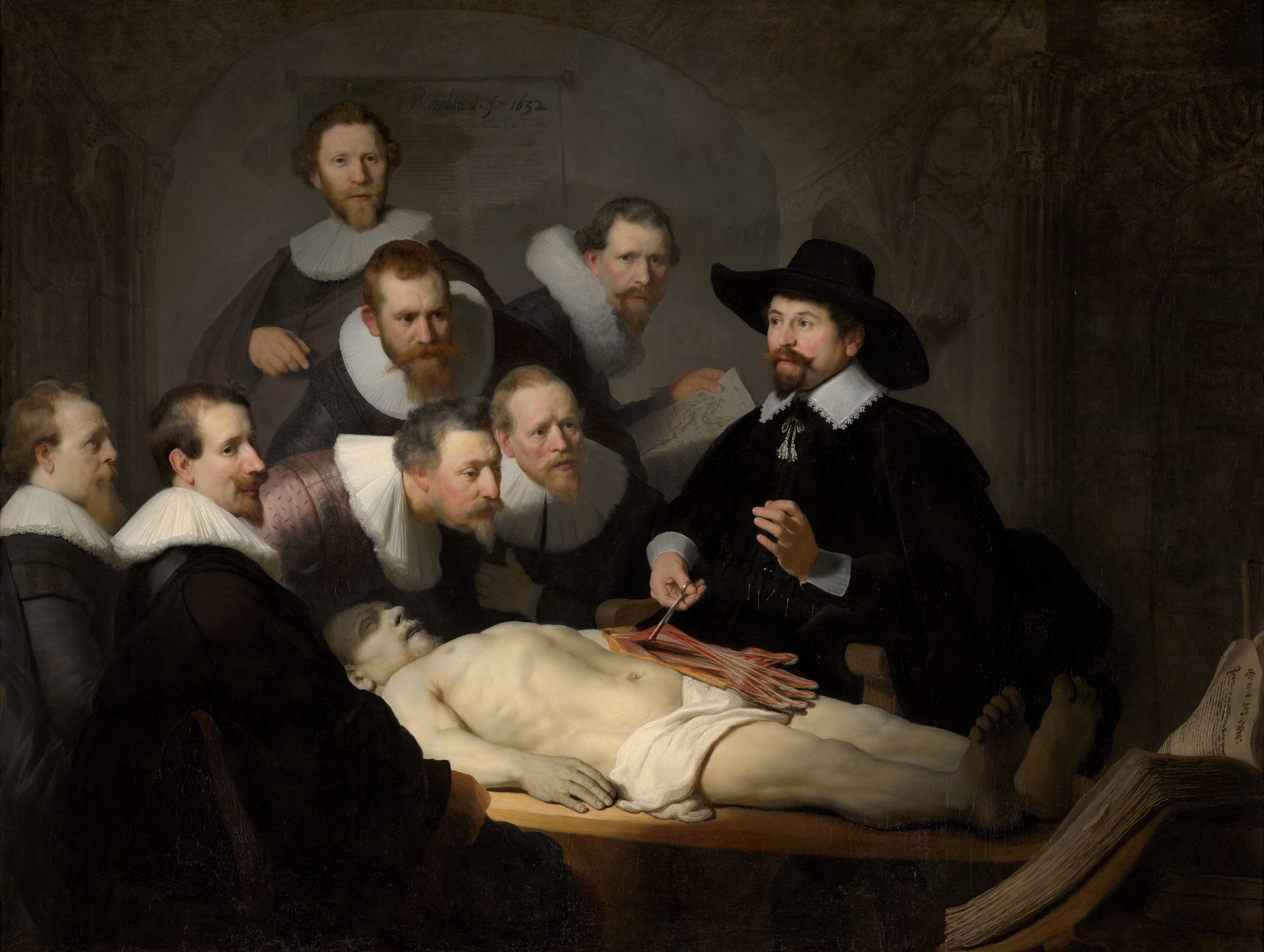
The Anatomy Lesson of Dr. Nicolaes Tulp by Rembrandt

- Rembrandt
  - The Anatomy Lesson of Dr. Nicolaes Tulp
  - Jacob de Gheyn
  - Maurits Huygens
  - Philosopher in Meditation (or Interior with Tobit and Anna)
- Nicholas Stone - Monument to Heneage Finch
- Jusepe de Ribera
  - Ixion
  - The Blind Sculptor
- Sir Anthony van Dyck
  - Queen Henrietta Maria
  - Thetis Receiving the Weapons of Achilles from Hephaestus
- Diego Velázquez
  - Christ Crucified
  - Temptation of St. Thomas

== Births ==
- January 11 - Adam Frans van der Meulen, Flemish Baroque painter specializing in battle scenes (died 1690)
- May 13 - Nicolas Pitau, Flemish engraver and printmaker (died 1671)
- August 8 - Johann Carl Loth, German painter active in Venice (died 1698)
- September 12 bapt. - Claude Lefèbvre, French painter and engraver (died 1675)
- October 31 - Johannes Vermeer, Dutch painter (died 1675)
- date unknown
  - Giacomo Alboresi, Italian painter (died 1677)
  - Hendrik Bary, Dutch engraver (died 1707)
  - Antoine Benoist, French painter and sculptor (died 1717)
  - Bartolomeo Biscaino, Italian painter, active in his native Genoa (died 1657)
  - Jean-Gilles Delcour, Flemish religious painter (died 1695)
  - Enkū, Japanese Buddhist monk and sculptor during the early Edo period (died 1695)
  - Wang Hui, Chinese landscape painter, the best known of the Four Wangs (died 1717)
  - Frederick Kerseboom, German painter (died 1690)
  - Giovanni Battista Merano, Italian painter of frescoes, mainly active in his native Genoa (died unknown)
  - Hendrik van Minderhout, Dutch seascape painter (died 1696)
  - Jan Wijnants, Dutch painter (died 1684)
- probable
  - Wu Li, Chinese landscape painter and poet during the Qing Dynasty (died 1718)
  - Wang Wu, Chinese painter and poet during the Qing Dynasty (died 1690)

== Deaths ==
- January - Abraham Janssens, Flemish painter (born 1567-1576)
- January 29 - Jan Porcellis, Dutch marine artist (born 1583/1585)
- July 17 - Hendrick van Balen, Flemish painter, who was born and died in Antwerp (born 1575)
- August 19 - Valentin de Boulogne, French painter (born 1591)
- October 23 - Giovanni Battista Crespi, Italian painter, sculptor, and architect (born 1573)
- date unknown
  - Francisco Salmerón, Spanish painter (born 1608)
  - Barend van Someren, Dutch Golden Age painter (born 1572)
- probable
  - Carlo Bononi, Italian painter of the School of Ferrara (born 1569)
  - Domenico Falcini, Flemish Renaissance painter and engraver (born 1575)
  - (died 1632/1633) Tanzio da Varallo, Italian painter of the late-Mannerist or early Baroque period (born 1575/1580)
  - David Vinckboons, Dutch painter of Flemish origin (born 1576)
