= 1690 in art =

Events from the year 1690 in art.

== Events ==
- Jean-Baptiste Monnoyer leaves France for England, where he produces a series of decorative panels for Montagu House, Bloomsbury.
- Approximate date – Dutch Golden Age artist Gerard de Lairesse goes blind due to congenital syphilis and gives up painting in favour of art theory.

== Paintings ==
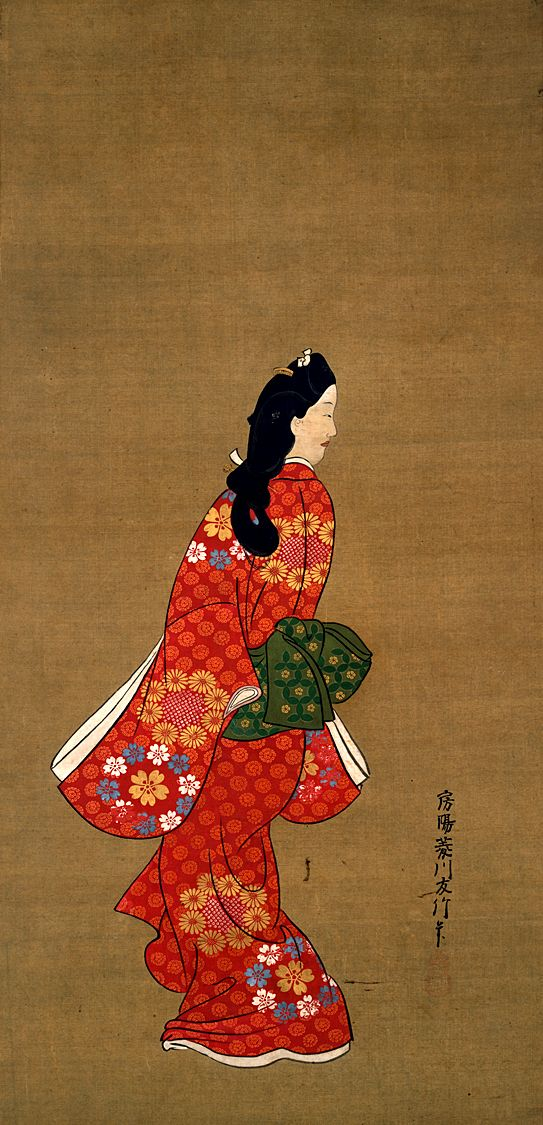
Hishikawa – Beauty looking back

- Ludolf Bakhuizen – Ships in distress in raging storm (Rijksmuseum)
- Richard Brakenburgh – Peasant scenes
- Melchior d'Hondecoeter – De Menagerie (approx. date – Rijksmuseum)
- Hishikawa Moronobu – Beauty looking back
- Charles Le Brun – Adoration of the Shepherds
- Ricardo do Pilar – Christ in Martyrdom (Monastery of São Bento, Rio de Janeiro)
- Jan Siberechts – Landscape with Rainbow, Henley-on-Thames
- Jan van Kessel the Younger – Noah and the Animals Entering the Ark
- Spinoza – Virgin del Carmen and the Child Jesus (Church of the Holy Kings, Metztitlán, Mexico; painting destroyed by fire 1998)
- Altarpiece of Strandebarm Church in Norway

== Births ==
- January 22 – Nicolas Lancret, French painter (died 1743)
- September 23 – Giuseppe Bazzani, Italian Rococo painter (died 1769)
- probable
  - Lorenzo Fratellini, Italian painter of miniature portraits (died 1729)
  - Claes Lang, Finnish painter (died 1761)
  - Philip Mercier, portrait painter (died 1760)
  - Michael Ignaz Mildorfer, Austrian painter (died 1747)
  - Ivan Nikitich Nikitin, Russian painter of portraits and battles (died 1741)
  - Orazio Solimena, Italian painter (died 1789)

== Deaths ==
- February 22 – Charles Le Brun, French painter (born 1619)
- March
  - Bendix Grodtschilling, Danish painter and carpenter (born 1620)
  - Abraham van Beijeren, Dutch painter (born 1620)
- March 17 – Jan van Mieris, Dutch painter (born 1660)
- April 25 – David Teniers the Younger, Flemish painter (born 1610)
- June 11 - Frederik Bloemaert, Dutch engraver (born c.1614)
- July 15 – Carlo Antonio Bussi, Swiss painter (born 1658)
- October 15
  - Juan de Valdés Leal, Spanish painter (born 1622)
  - Adam Frans van der Meulen, Flemish Baroque painter specializing in battle scenes (born 1632)
- date unknown
  - Giacomo Barri, Italian painter and printmaker (born unknown)
  - Benjamin Block, German–Hungarian portrait painter (born 1631)
  - Abraham Brueghel, Flemish painter from the famous Brueghel family of artists (born 1631)
  - Antonio Castrejon, Spanish painter (born 1625)
  - Tommaso Costa, Italian painter (born 1634)
  - Giovanni Stefano Danedi, Italian painter of frescoes (born 1608/1612)
  - Francesco di Maria, Italian painter active mainly in Naples (born 1623)
  - Frederick Kerseboom, German painter (born 1632)
  - Francesco Pianta, Italian sculptor (born 1634)
  - Herman Verelst, Dutch Golden Age portrait and still life painter (born 1641)
  - Yun Shouping, Chinese painter of the Qing dynasty (born 1633)
- probable
  - Pietro Lucatelli, Italian painter active in Rome (born 1630)
  - Wang Wu, Chinese painter and poet of the Qing Dynasty (born 1632)
