= Archivolt =

Ornamental molding or band following the curve on the underside of an arch

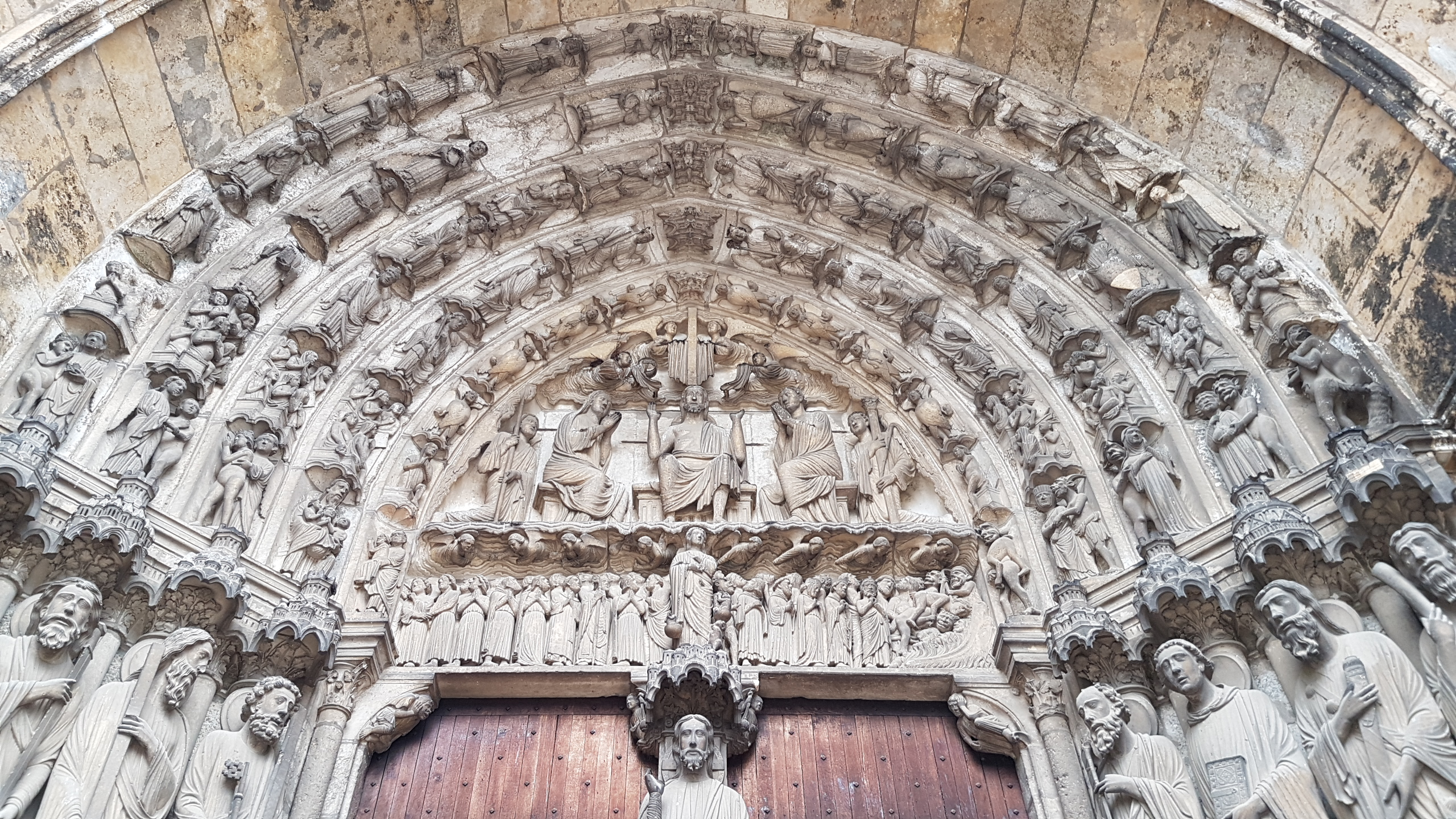
Archivolts on the South Portal of the Cathedral of Our Lady of Chartres, Chartres, France.

An archivolt (or voussure) is an ornamental moulding or band following the curve on the underside of an arch. It is composed of bands of ornamental mouldings (or other architectural elements) surrounding an arched opening, corresponding to the architrave in the case of a rectangular opening. The word is sometimes used to refer to the under-side or inner curve of the arch itself (more properly, the intrados). Most commonly archivolts are found as a feature of the arches of church portals. The mouldings and sculptures on these archivolts are used to convey a theological story or depict religious figures and ideologies of the church in order to represent the gateway between the holy space of the church and the external world. The presence of archivolts on churches is seen throughout history, although their design, both architecturally and artistically, is heavily influenced by the period they were built in and the churches they were designed for.

== Etymology ==
The word originates in the Italian (or French) equivalents of the English words arch and vault.

== Structural features ==
Archivolts are usually found as a part of a church portals, on the underside of the arches above the tympanum, bracketing the lintel and ending on the jamb columns, each archway usually has several layered archivolts. While this basic structure and placement of archivolts is usually present, the specific artistic features of archivolts change frequently as a result of when and where they were designed and what kind of church they are a feature of. The shape of the arch is an example of this, in Gothic portals a pointed archway is iconic, while in Romanesque portals a rounded archway is to be expected. These rounded and pointed features are also seen inside the church, where Gothic churches have pointed vaults, and Romanesque churches have rounded ones.

== Evolution of archivolts ==
Archivolts first became a feature on the entrance of churches in France and Spain during the Reconquest. They are believed to have evolved as a compressed version of the nave of a church, the moldings of the layered arches depicting a theological journey from outside the church to the sacred atmosphere inside it.

The use of stone sculpture on the outside of churches was first widely seen in the eleventh century. The later utilisation of these mouldings and sculptures is depicted by Calvin Kendall, “[Church Portals] concerned themselves with the spiritual well-being of worshippers, and they served to create and delineate sacred space.” The use of portals and the mouldings on their archivolts as a separation between the outside public domain and the holy space inside a church was an innovative idea to communicate knowledge about the church and theology observed inside.

As demonstrated by Rudolph Conrad, this evolution in the utilisation of church architecture came about simultaneously with the significant advances of categorising, maintaining and sharing large amounts of information that was happening in the twelfth century. The application of this in the design of archivolts is shown through the complex theological stories and messages that are represented by the detailed design of many archivolts.

== Historical context ==
=== Romanesque ===
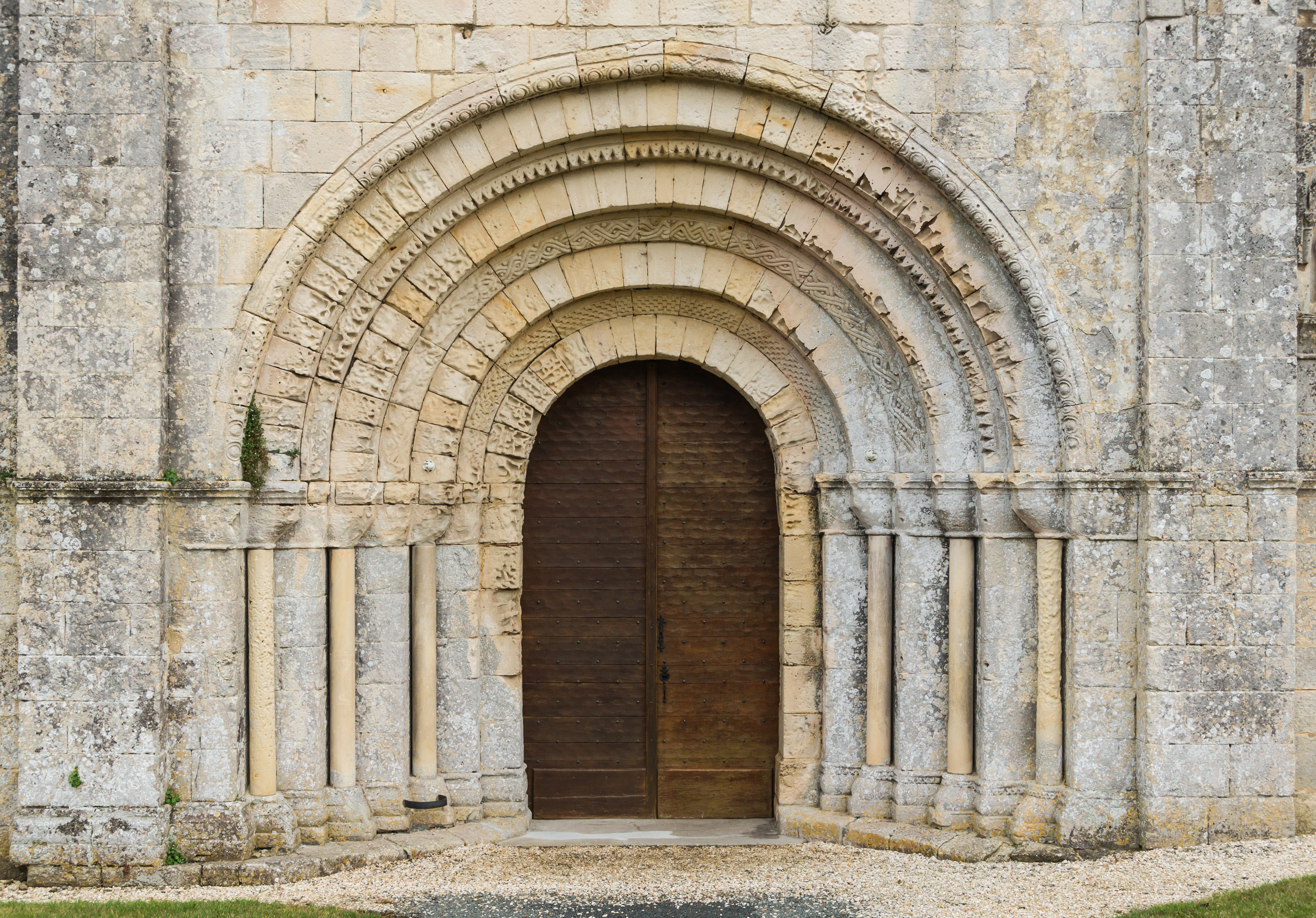
Romanesque portal with rounded archivolts on Saint-Sulpice church in Paris

The complexity of church portals and the subsequent significance of their mouldings and the designs of their archivolts was first observed on a wide scale on Romanesque churches, seen primarily in the eleventh century through to the early thirteenth century. The Romanesque period of church architecture is when stone sculpture began to become a common feature of church portals, specifically the use of Christ, on the archivolts and surrounds to signify the beginning of holy space. Romanesque portals and archivolts are most often rounded, as seen in Roman architecture. This was significant to the role of the church as both a building and congregational place as during the medieval Romanesque period most people were not able read, so these sculptures were able to depict important events central to the Christian faith and convey ideologies of the church that the public may have otherwise been unable to understand.

=== Gothic ===
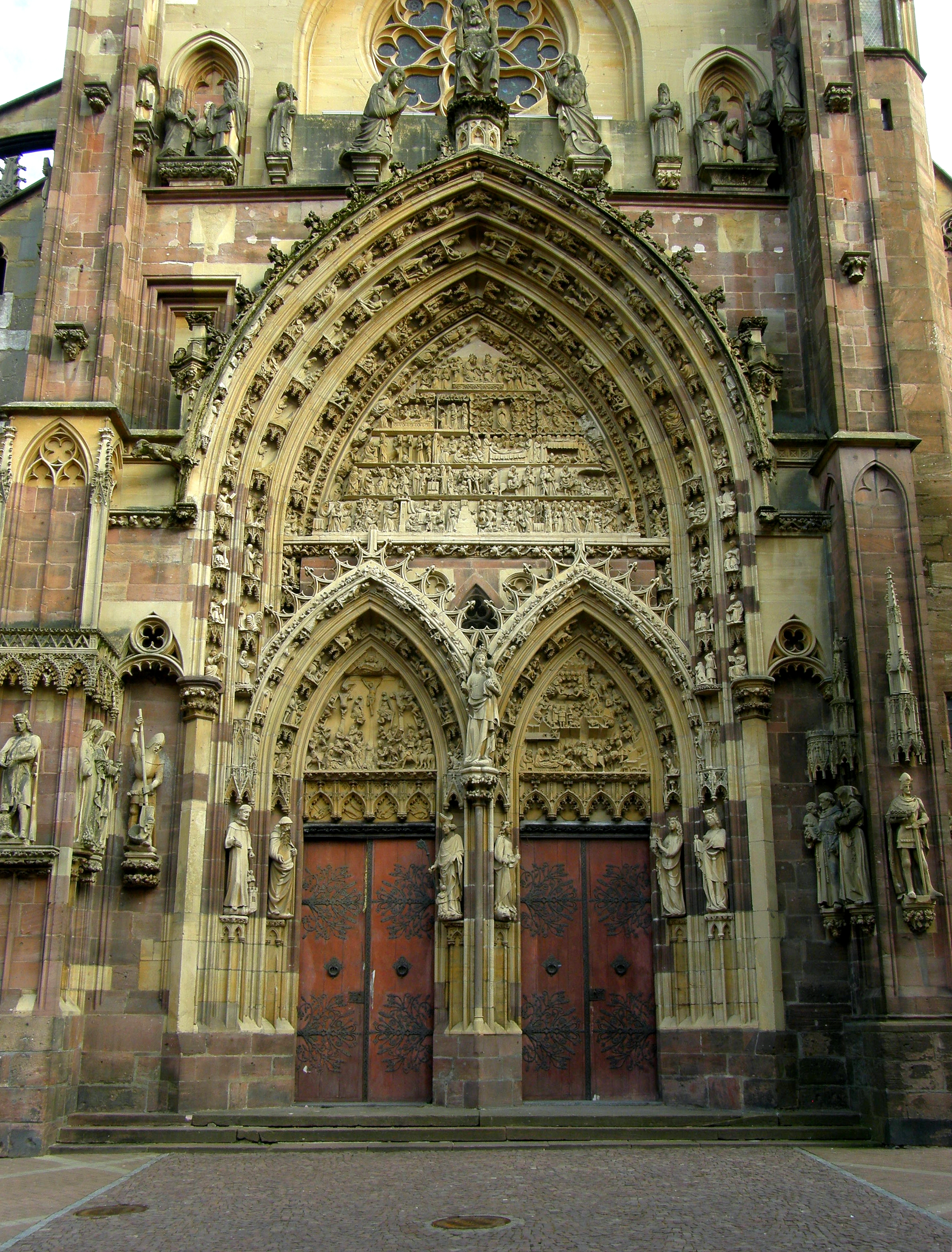
Gothic Portal with pointed archivolts on St Theobald's Church in Thann

Gothic architecture, predominately found between in mid-twelfth century and the sixteenth century was the successor to Romanesque architecture, and is often viewed as the birth of Christian architecture. This is seen in the symbolism of both the artistic and architectural features of Gothic portals and their archivolts. The classic pointed arch of Gothic portals and archivolts is used to direct people’s eyes above, to heaven, a constant reminder of the presence of God and an encouragement to focus on the sacred and heavenly aspects of life, and not the earthly ones.

== Notable examples ==
=== Saint-Denis Cathedral ===
The Saint-Denis Cathedral is a French cathedral, known as one of the founding examples of Gothic Christian architecture, it was designed by Abbott Suger in the twelfth century and constructed during the thirteenth century. While it is generally accepted that the portals on the west facing side of Saint-Denis cathedral have most of the Early Gothic architectural features, as claimed by Pamela Blum, there is still some debate about whether the cathedral is more accurately characterised as Gothic or Romanesque due to the multiple restorations that have been done on the Cathedral in varying artistic and architectural styles since it was built.

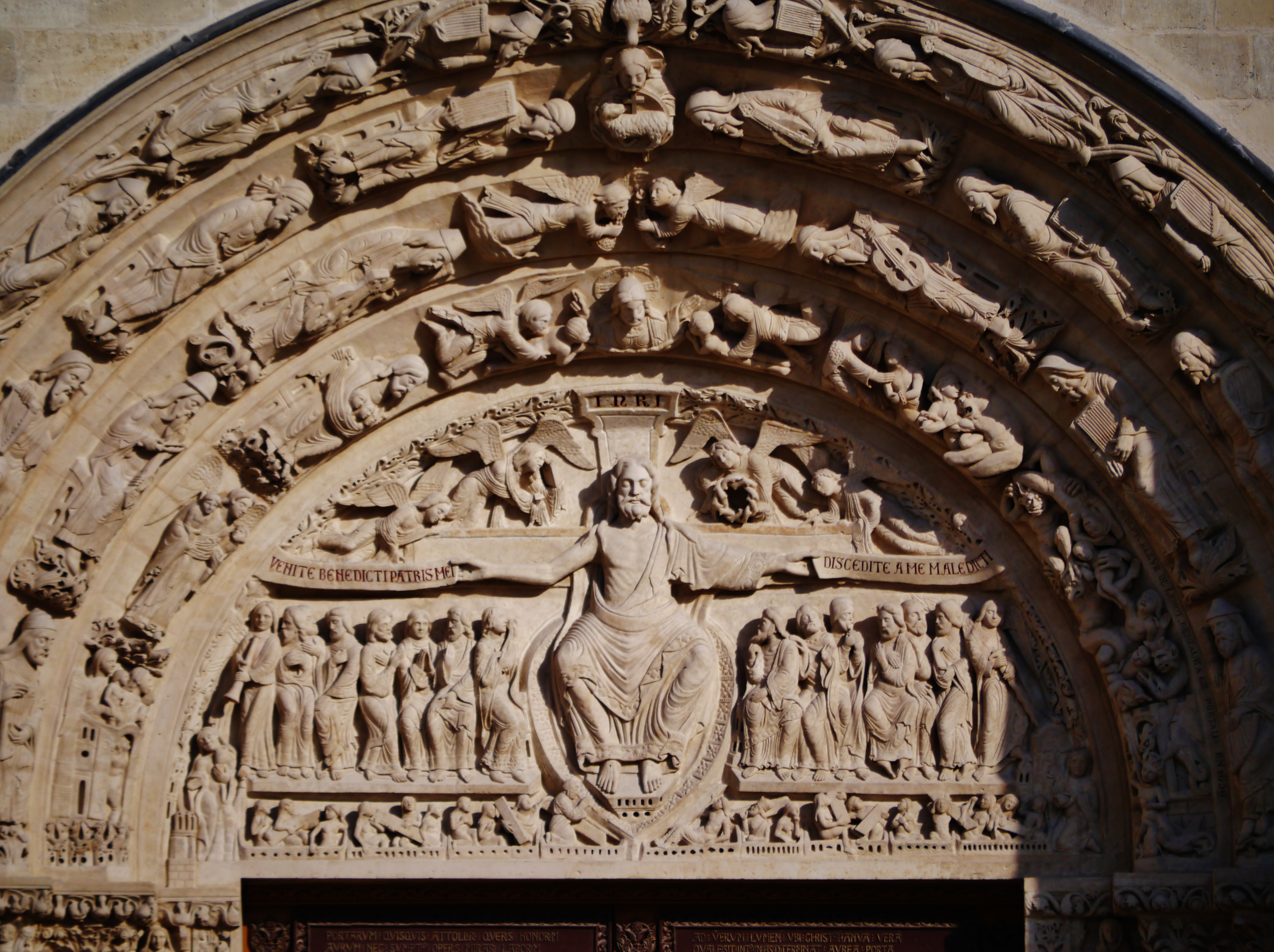
Central Portal on the West Facade of the Saint Denis Cathedral

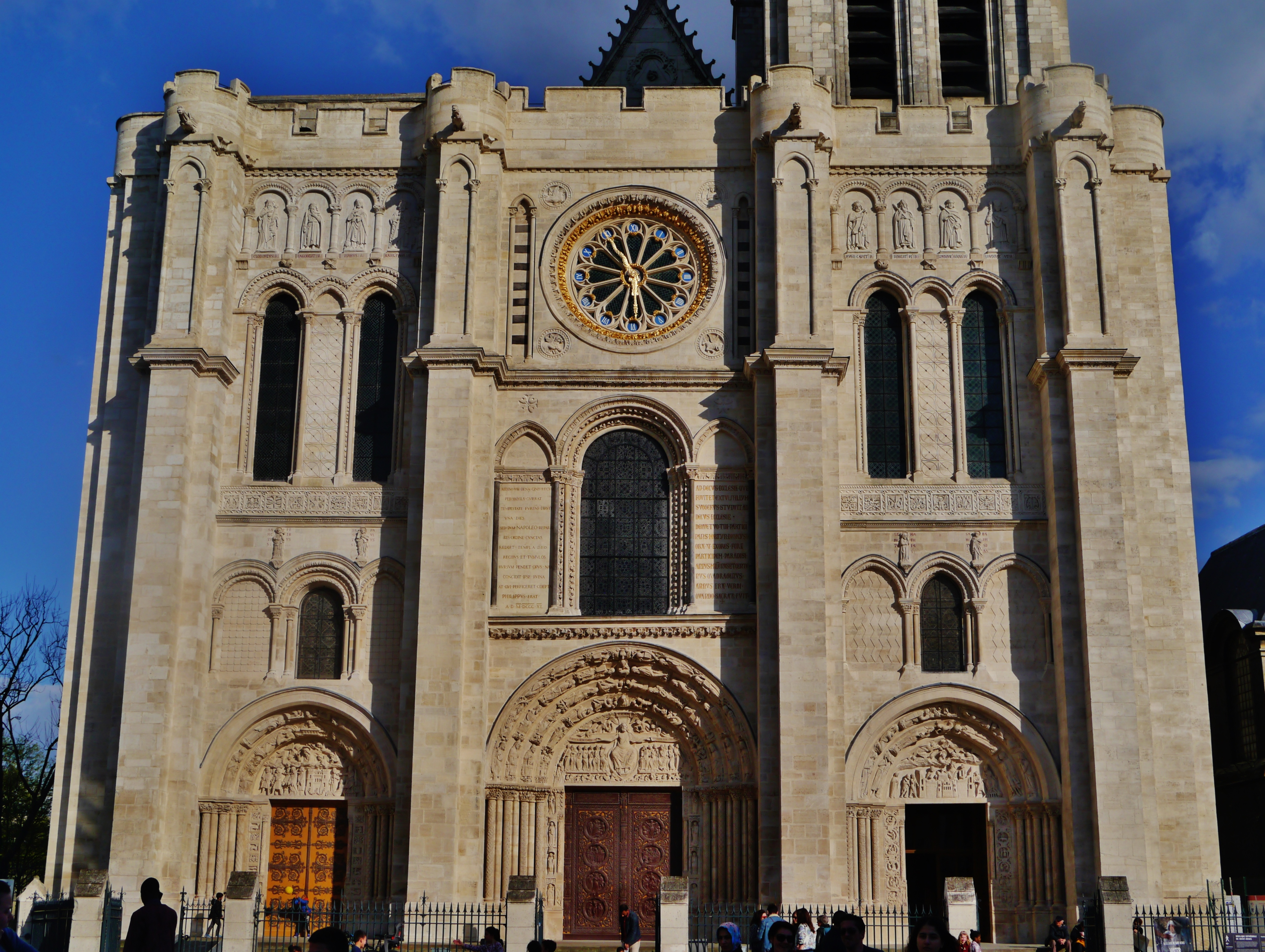
West Facade of the Saint Denis Cathedral

The west-side of the cathedral is home to three church portals, all of which contain archivolts. In 1140 these three portals and the west-end of Saint-Denis Cathedral were consecrated. The archivolts of the Saint-Denis Cathedral are one of the earliest examples of the use of complex sculptures and inscriptions on church entrances as a means of communication in Gothic churches. As the archivolts of Saint-Denis Cathedral were designed in the very early stages of Gothic architecture, there are still instances of features that characterise Romanesque architecture such as the use of drapery in the sculptures of the portal.

=== The Sainte-Anne Portal, Notre Dame ===
Sainte-Anne portal situated on the west facade of the Notre Dame was built in Paris during the twelfth century in honour of Sainte-Anne, Mary’s Mother and Jesus Christ’s Grandmother. The portal displays some of the different aspects of Jesus Christ’s life, like his Grandparents Anne (whom the portal is dedicated to) and Joachim, and his parents Mary and Joseph. The archivolts of the Saint-Anne portal are pointed, a classic feature of Gothic archways. The archivolts are lined with several small sculptures of people, these sculptures have been identified as coming from both the twelfth and thirteenth century. Several restorations have been performed on the Saint-Anne archivolts, which was discovered as a result of the slightly varying stylistic features of the archivolts and colour differences in the stone the archivolt is made of. These sculptures on the portal and its archivolts depict specific people that were significant to the church and the community it served, both as religious icons, and figures of societal power at the time of its design, such as King Louis VIII, bishops involved with the church, Jesus and several members of his family.

Detail on the Archivolts of Sainte-Anne Portal

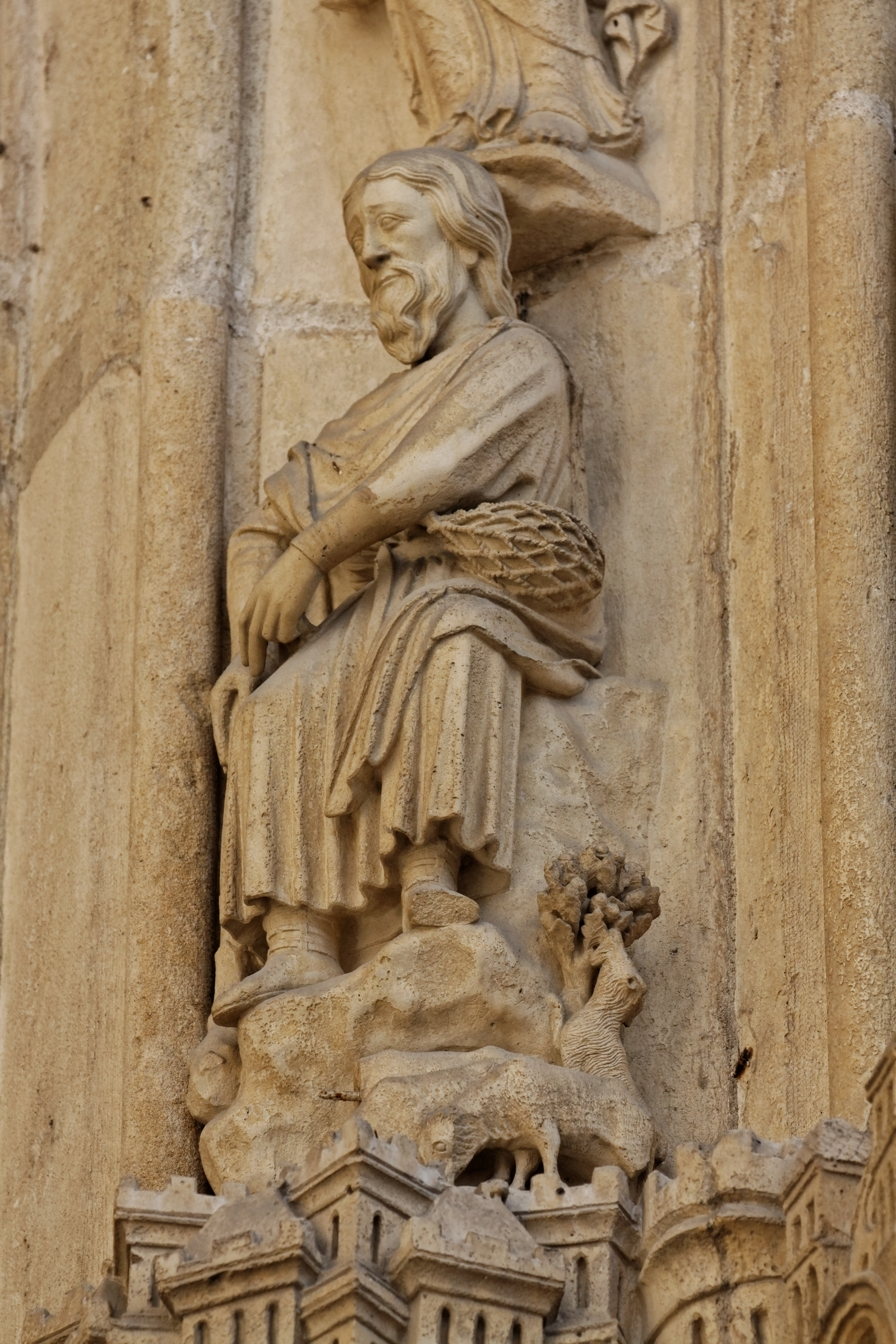

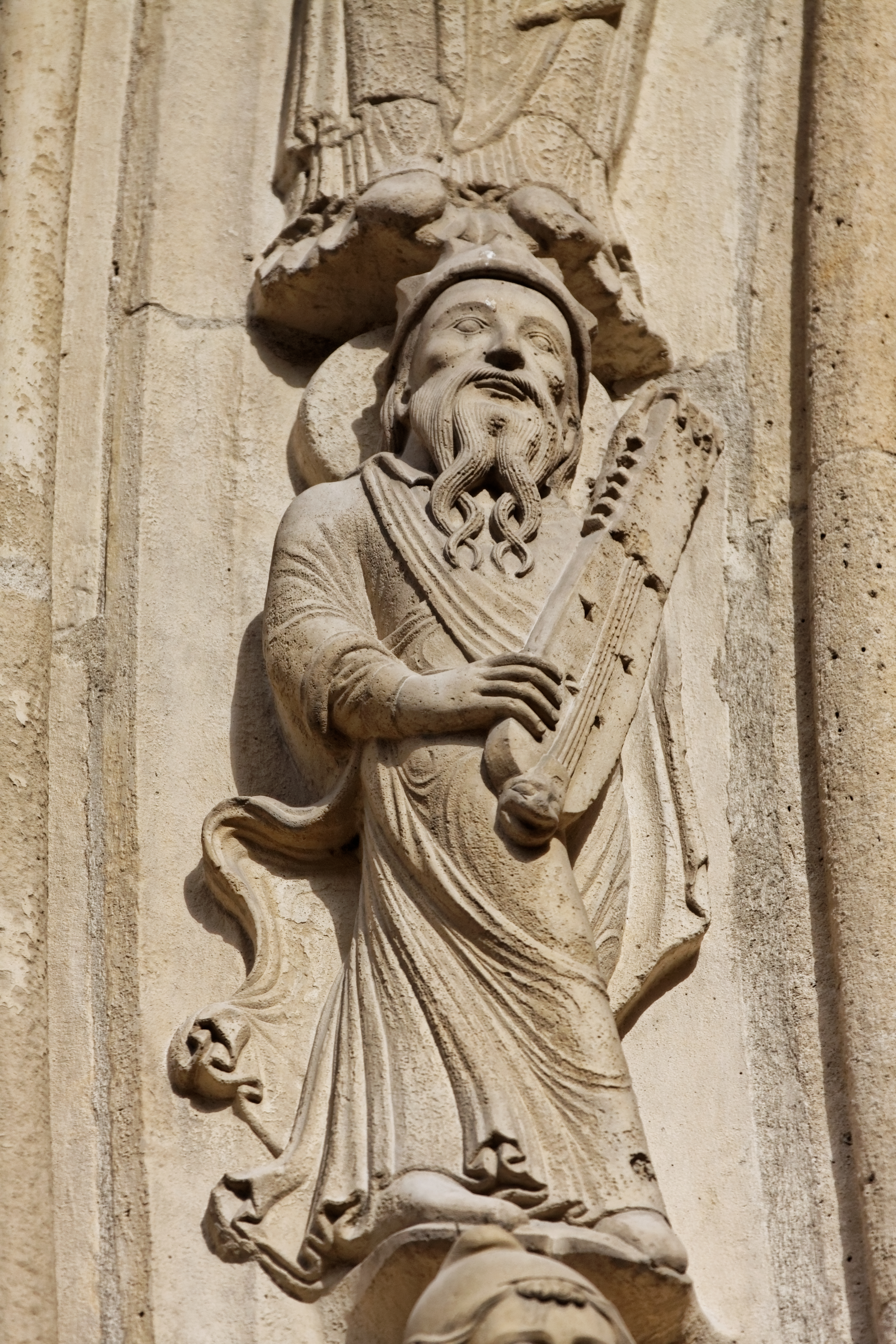

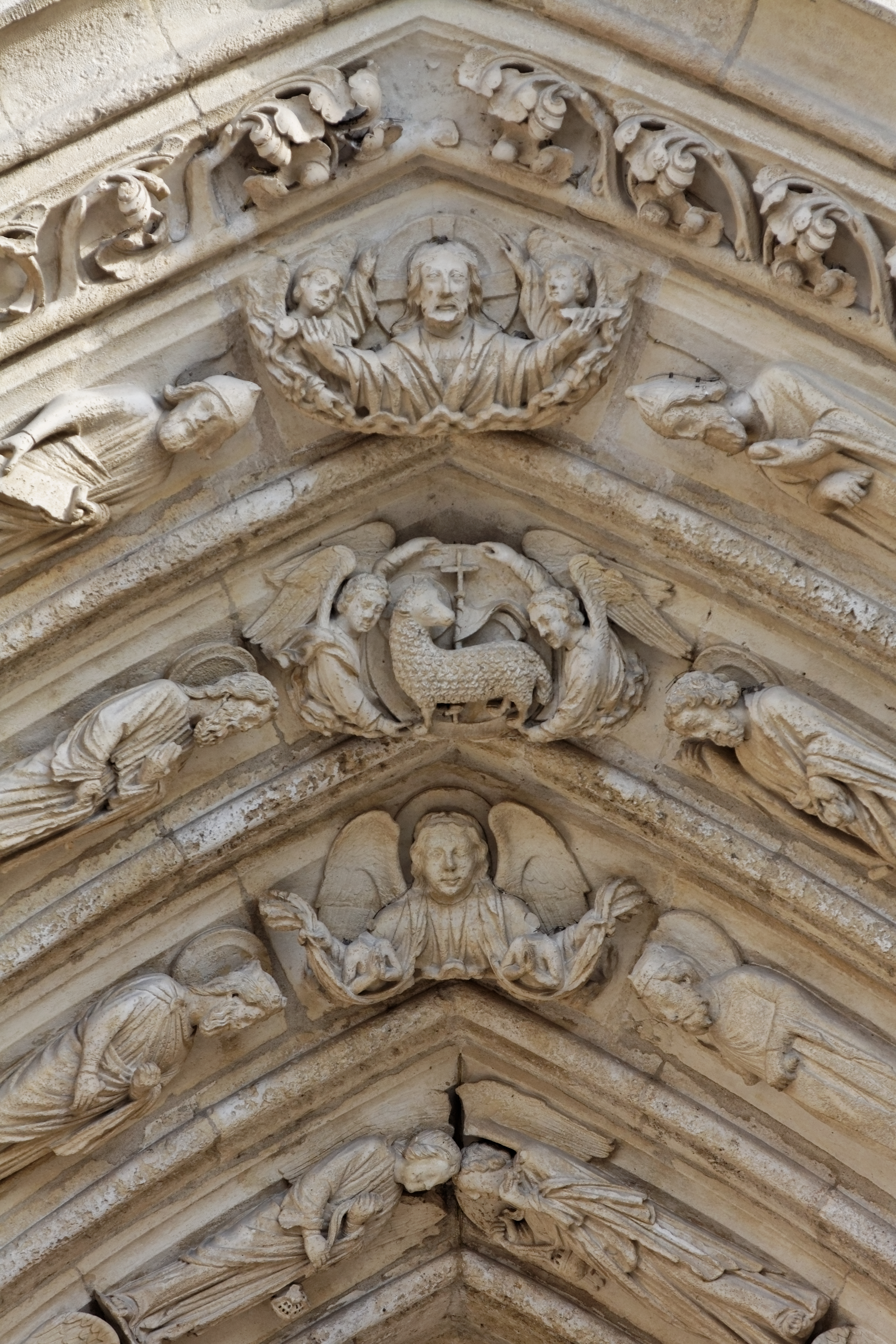

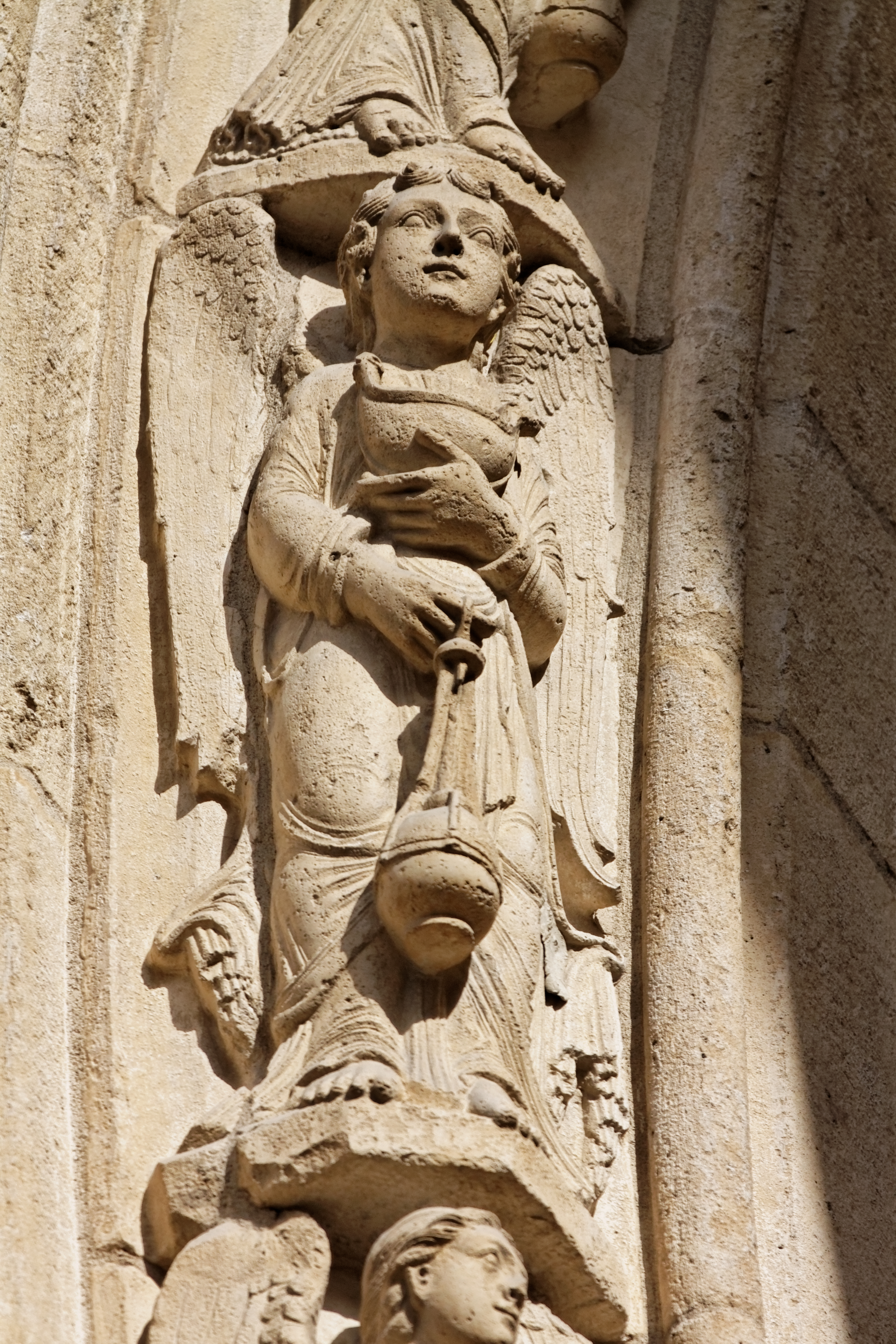

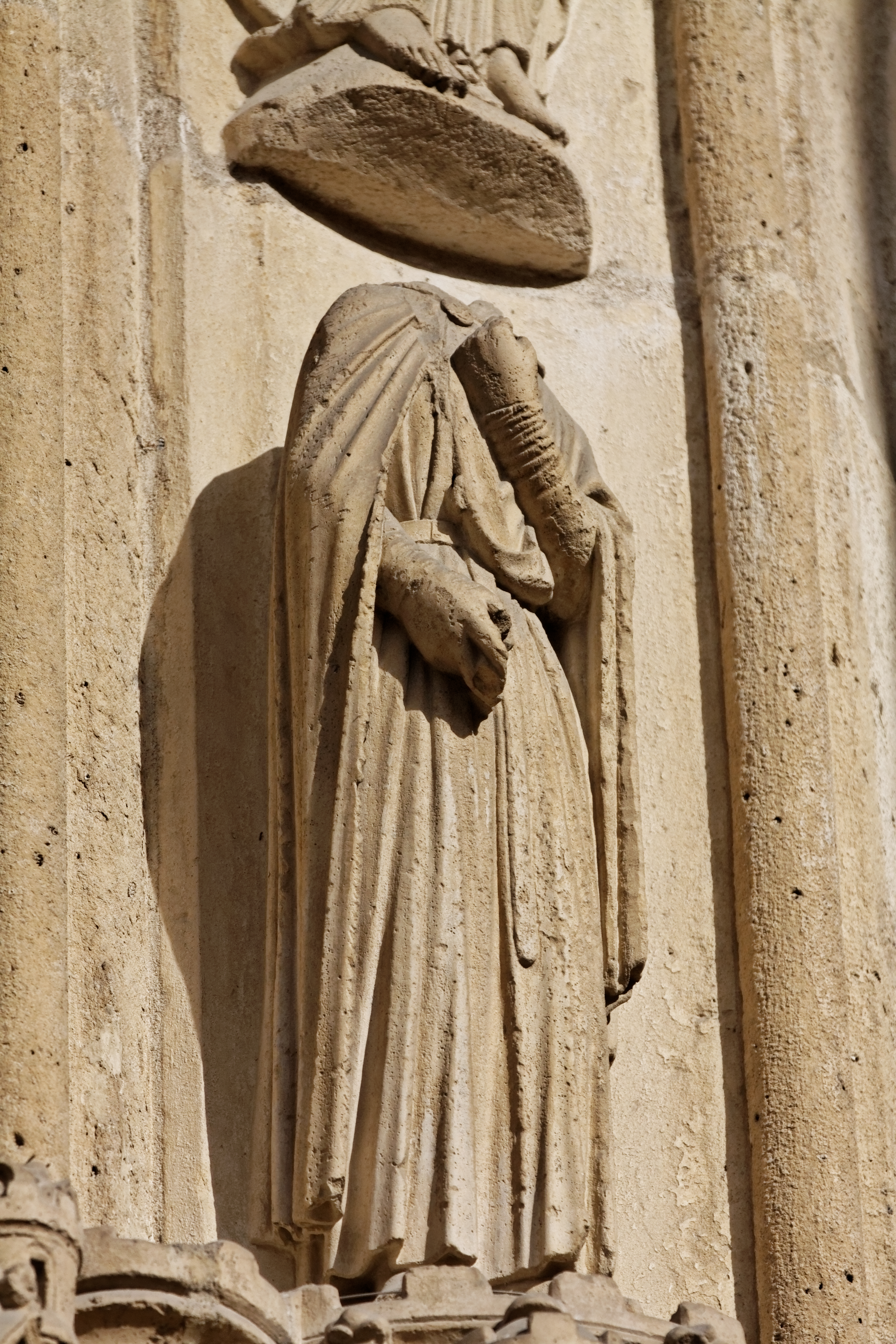

=== Vézelay Abbey ===
The Vézelay Abbey was built in France in the ninth century on a hill in the village of Vézelay by Benedictine Monks and became a UNESCO world heritage site in 1979. This classification is due to its well preserved Burgundian Romanesque art and its importance as a religious site to Christians in the Middle Ages. The portal has a rounded arch, classic to the Romanesque style and is densely populated with many different sculptures and mouldings. The artwork on the Vézelay Abbey’s portal depicts messages and figures such as scenes from the Book of Acts, Christ, Apostles and John the Baptist. The sculptures and mouldings on the portal’s archivolts display events of the Pentecost, from the Book of Acts,

The peripheral figures of the archivolt compartments and the lintel blocks are divided into Jews on the left, led by Peter holding the keys just to the left of Christ, and gentiles on the right, led by Paul seated immediately to the right of Christ. That the gentile audience of the passage is frequently enjoined to enter the Church in a state of peace is also visualized, through the depiction of the leading (gentile) figure on the right lintel relinquishing his sword blade-downward, in an emphatically pacifist gesture.

— Peter Low (2012)

The Benedictine Monks that founded the Vézelay Abbey claimed that the remains of Mary Magdalene were found there, which made it a site of significant religious importance and consequently it became a popular site for pilgrims. The arrival of pilgrims and the subsequent increased notoriety led to vast renovations, resulting in its complex and grand artistic style. The importance of what is happening at the time of a portal’s construction, as well as its church’s intended audience is demonstrated by the design of the portal’s tympanum, which contains a large sculpture of Jesus Christ in its centre, with Magdalene depicted facing Christ at his feet. This highlights the significance of the Abbey’s purpose as a pilgrimage site to its design.

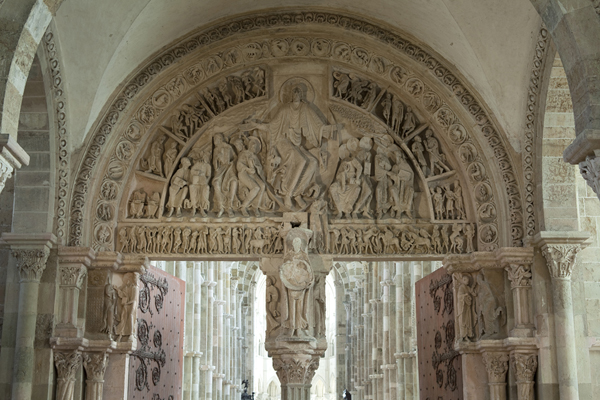
A Portal of the Vézelay Abbey

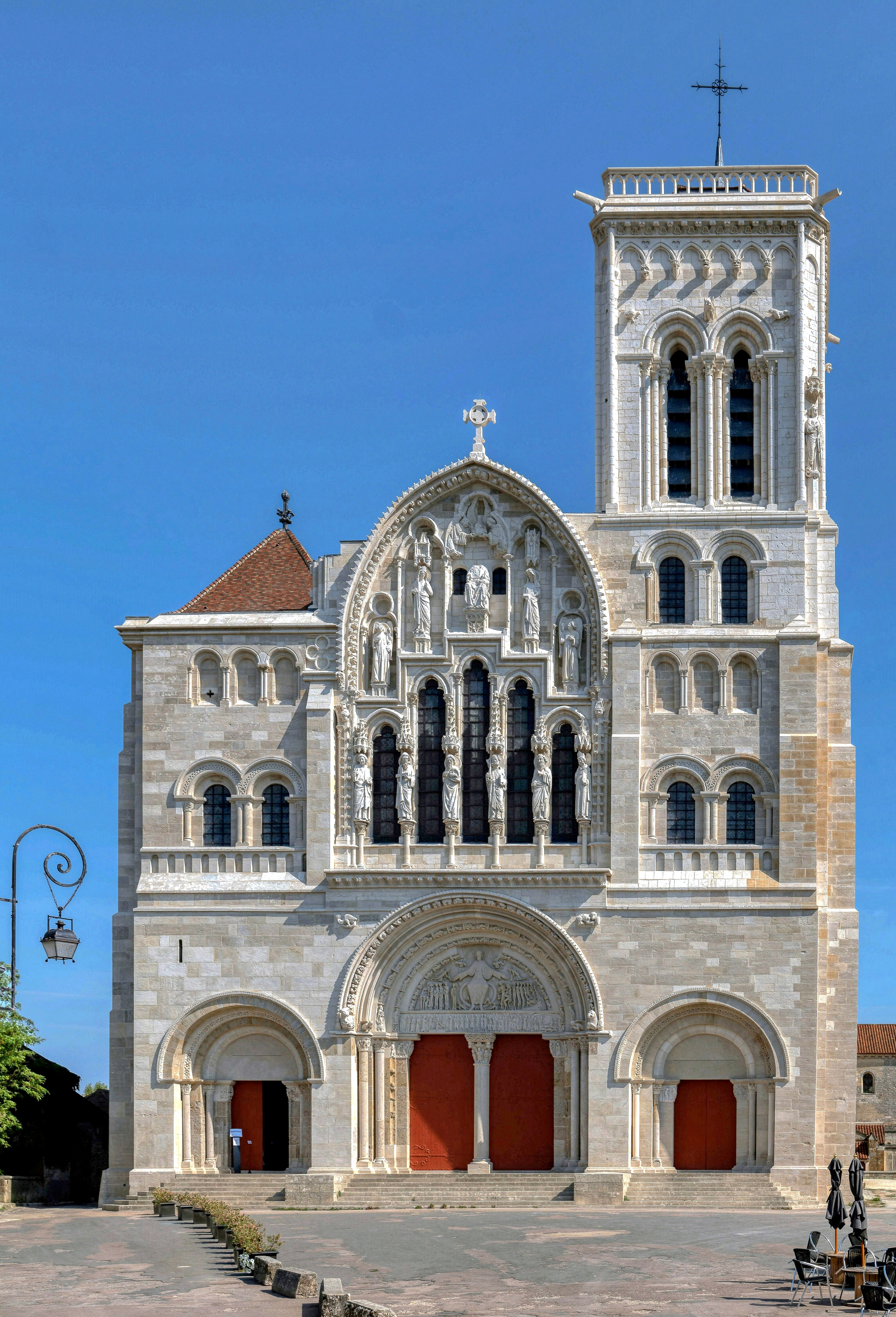
Facade of the Vézelay Abbey

== Gallery ==
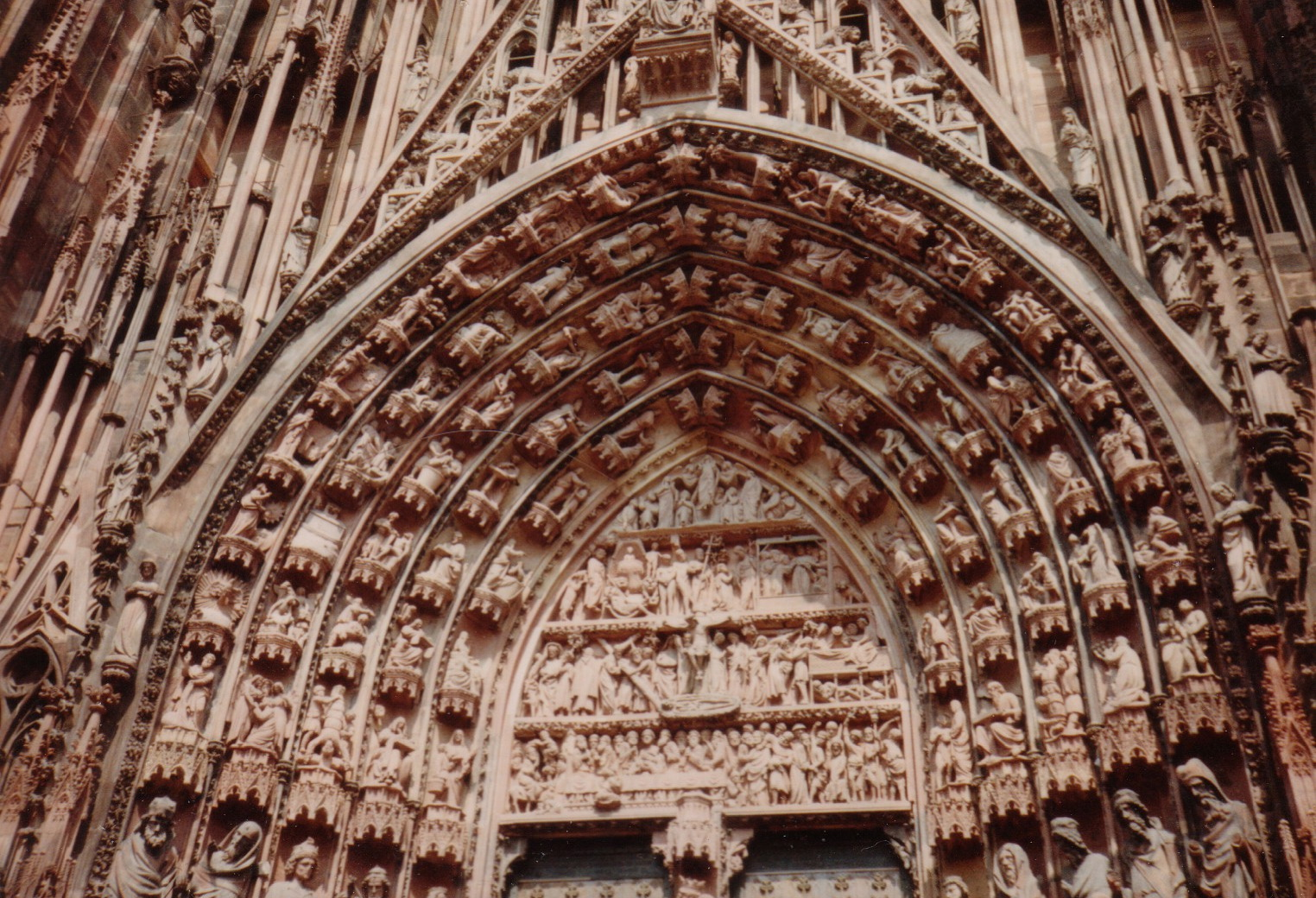
Archivolts and tympanum from Strasbourg Cathedral, France

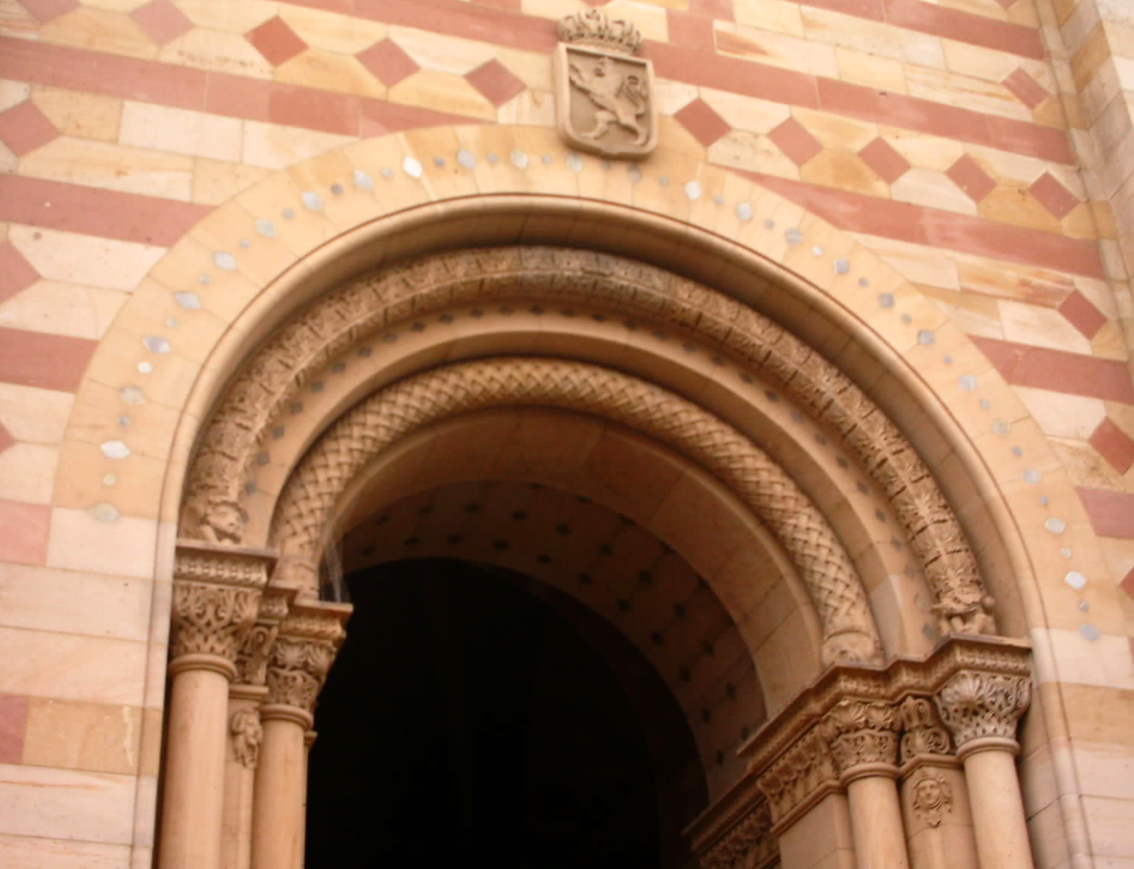
Entrance into Speyer Cathedral, Germany

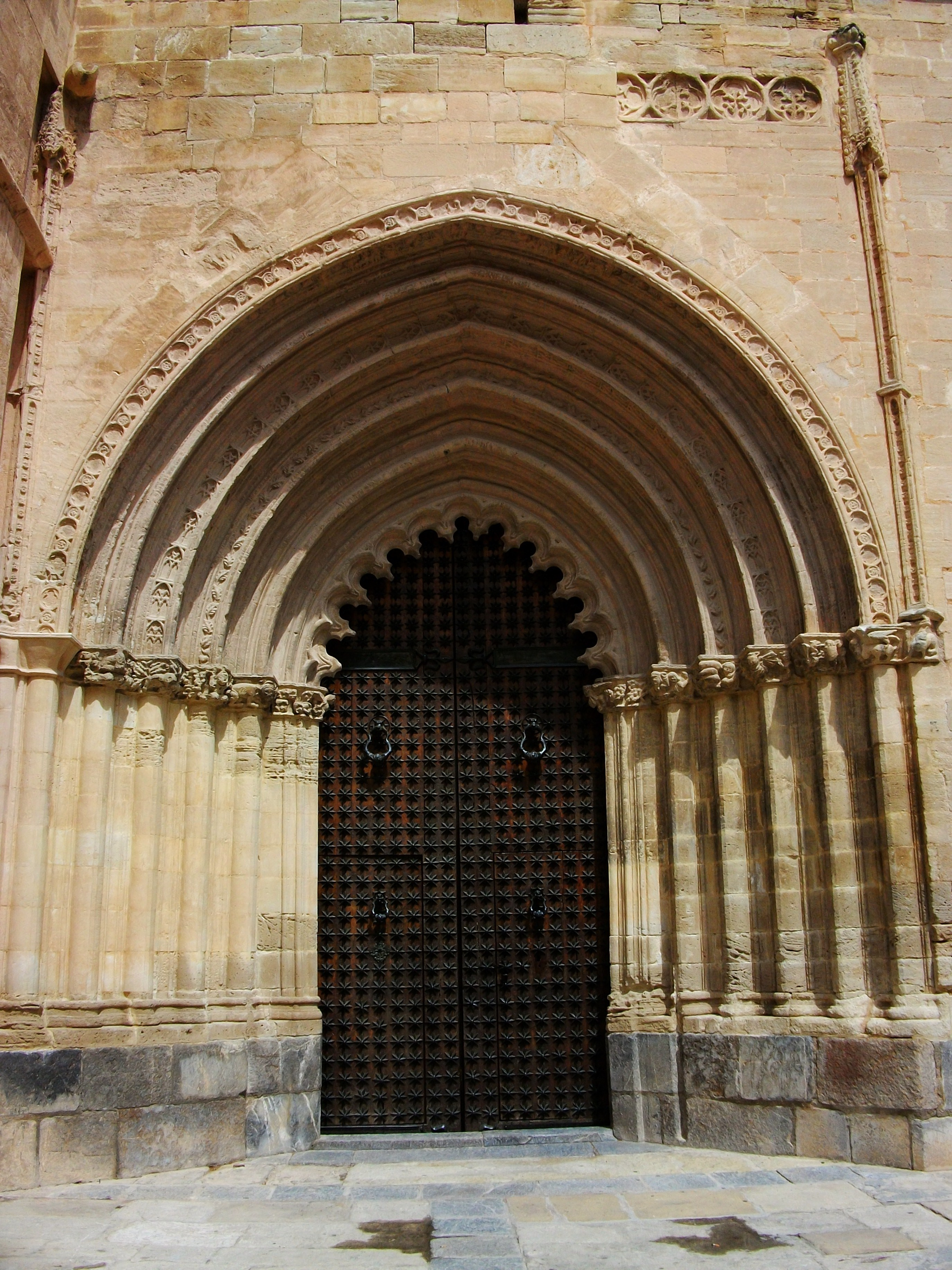
Gateway into Orihuela Cathedral in Orihuela, Spain

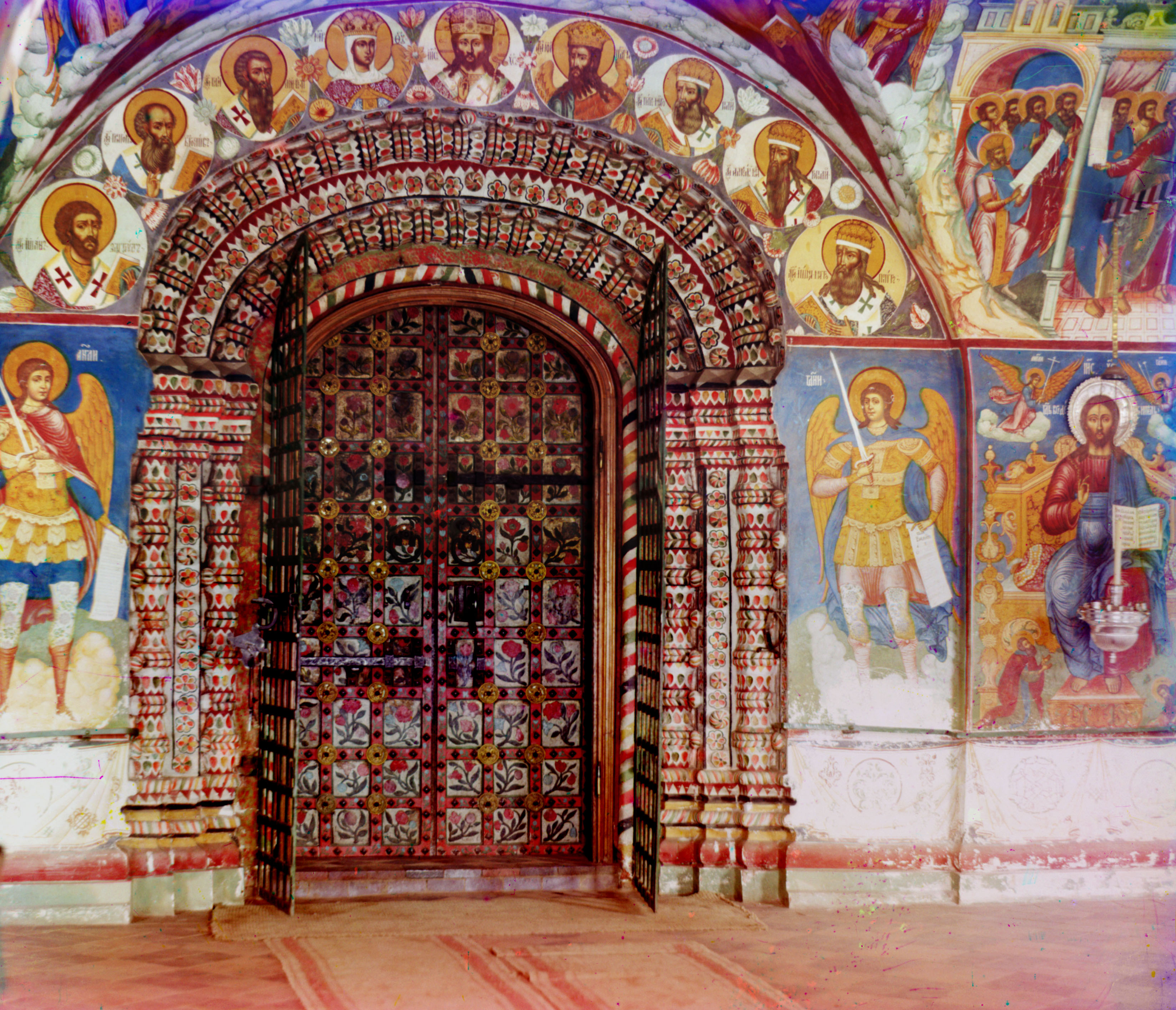
A 1911 image showing the central church of the Church of St. John in Yaroslavl, Russia

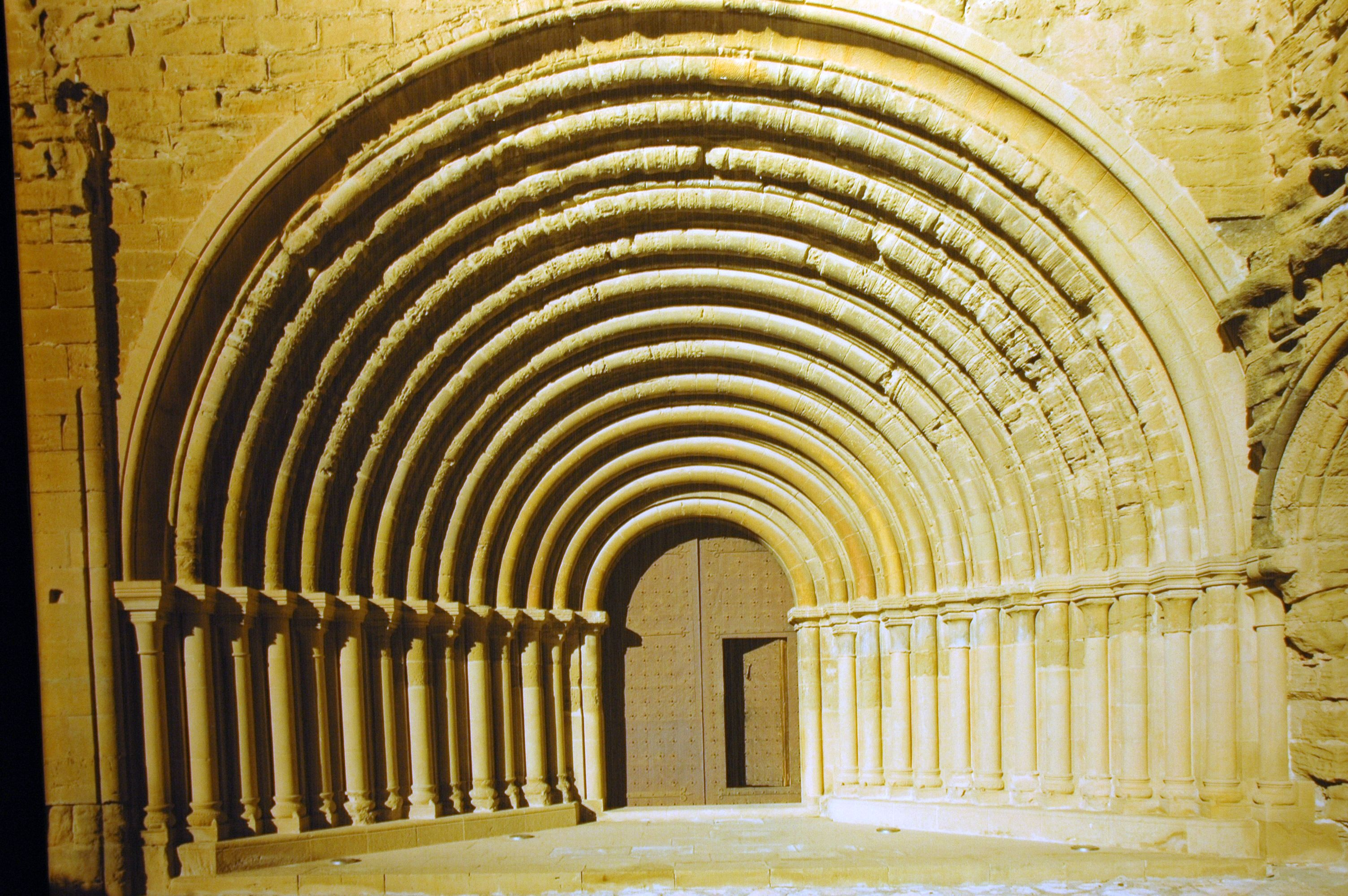
14 archivolts enclose the Romanesque entranceway into the Monastery of Santa María de Sigena in Aragon, Spain
