= Shield of Achilles =

Shield described in Homer's Iliad

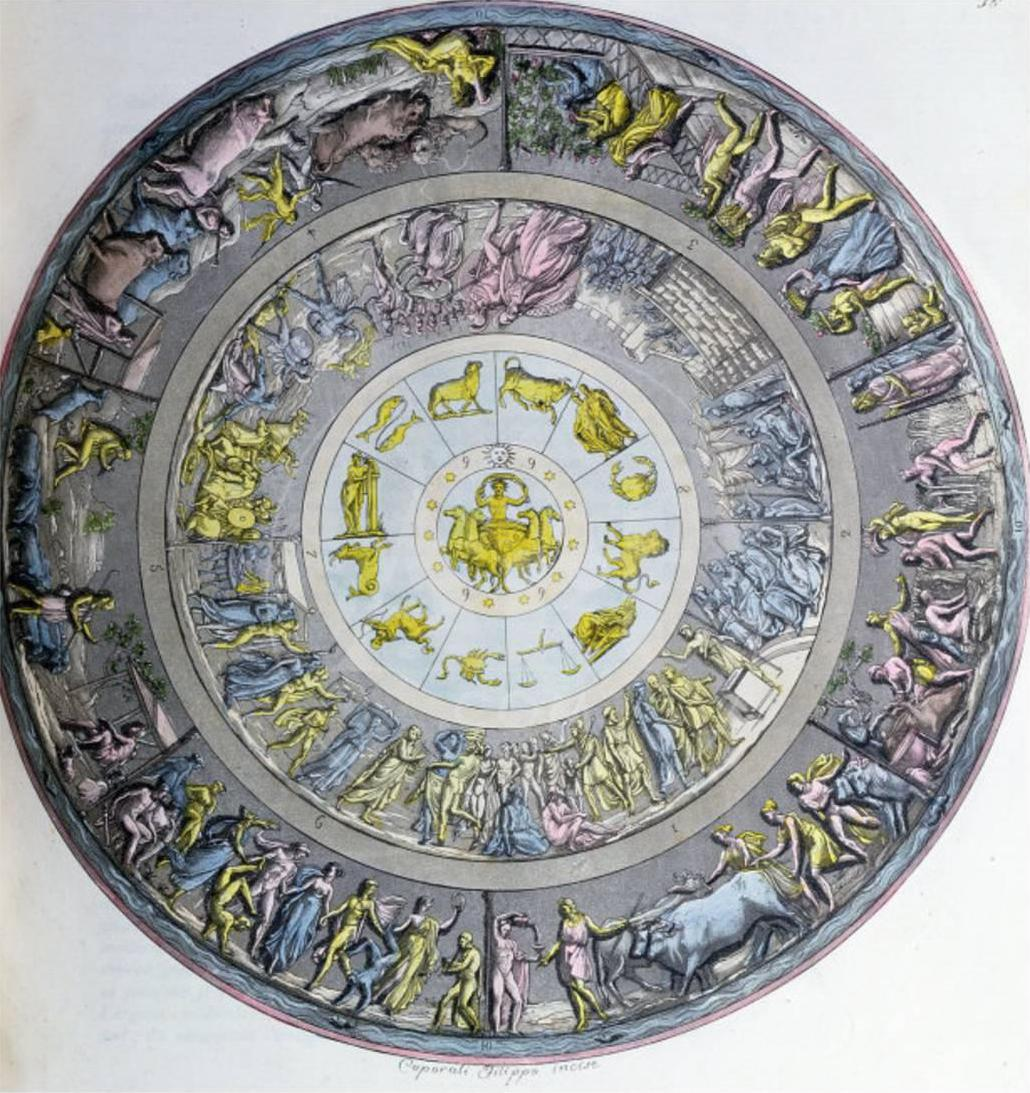
The shield's design as interpreted by Angelo Monticelli, from Le Costume Ancien ou Moderne, ca. 1820.

The shield of Achilles is the shield that Achilles uses in his fight with Hector, as described in a passage in Book 18, lines 478–608 of Homer's Iliad. The intricately detailed imagery on the shield has inspired many different interpretations of its significance.

== Overview ==
In the poem, Achilles lends Patroclus his armor in order to lead the Achaean army into battle. Ultimately, Patroclus is killed in battle by Hector, and Achilles' armor is stripped from his body and taken by Hector as spoils. The loss of his companion prompts Achilles to return to battle, so his mother Thetis, a nymph, asks the god Hephaestus to provide replacement armor for her son. He obliges, and forges a shield with spectacular decorative imagery.

== Criticism ==
Homer's description of the shield is the first known example of ekphrasis in ancient Greek poetry; this is a rhetorical device in which a detailed textual description is given of a visual work of art. Besides providing narrative exposition, it can add deeper meaning to an artwork by reflecting on the process of its creation, in turn allowing the audience to envision artwork that they cannot see.

The passage in which Homer describes the creation of the shield has influenced many later poems, including the Shield of Heracles once attributed to Hesiod. Virgil's description of the shield of Aeneas in Book Eight of the Aeneid is clearly modeled on Homer. Of other significance, this passage is recognized as the first example of cosmological mapping in the history of Greece.

== After the classical period ==
The theme inspired related illustrations and paintings, for example Thetis Receiving the Weapons of Achilles from Hephaestus by Anthony van Dyck.

At least since the beginning of the 18th century scholars and artisans attempted to recreate the shield in detail on paper, gold, and bronze.

The poem The Shield of Achilles (1952) by W. H. Auden reimagines Homer's description in 20th-century terms.

== Description ==
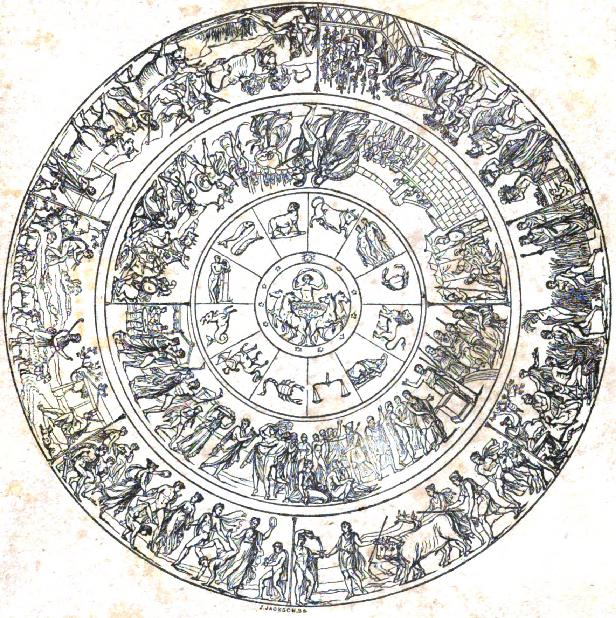
The shield of Achilles, from an 1832 illustration.

Homer gives a detailed description of the imagery which decorates the new shield. Starting from the shield's center and moving outward, circle layer by circle layer, the shield is laid out as follows:

1. The Earth, sky and sea, the sun, the moon and the constellations: Pleiades, Hyades, Orion, and Ursa Major (484–89)
2. "Two beautiful cities full of people": in one a wedding and a law case are taking place (490–508); the other city is besieged by one feuding army and the shield shows an ambush and a battle (509–40)
3. A field being plowed for the third time (541–49)
4. A king's estate where the harvest is being reaped (550–60)
5. A vineyard with grape pickers and children (561–72)
6. A "herd of straight-horned cattle"; the lead bull has been attacked by a pair of savage lions which the herdsmen and their dogs are trying to beat off (573–86)
7. A picture of a sheep farm (587–89)
8. A dancing floor where young men and women are dancing and courting (590–606)
9. The great stream of Ocean (607–608)

== Interpretations ==
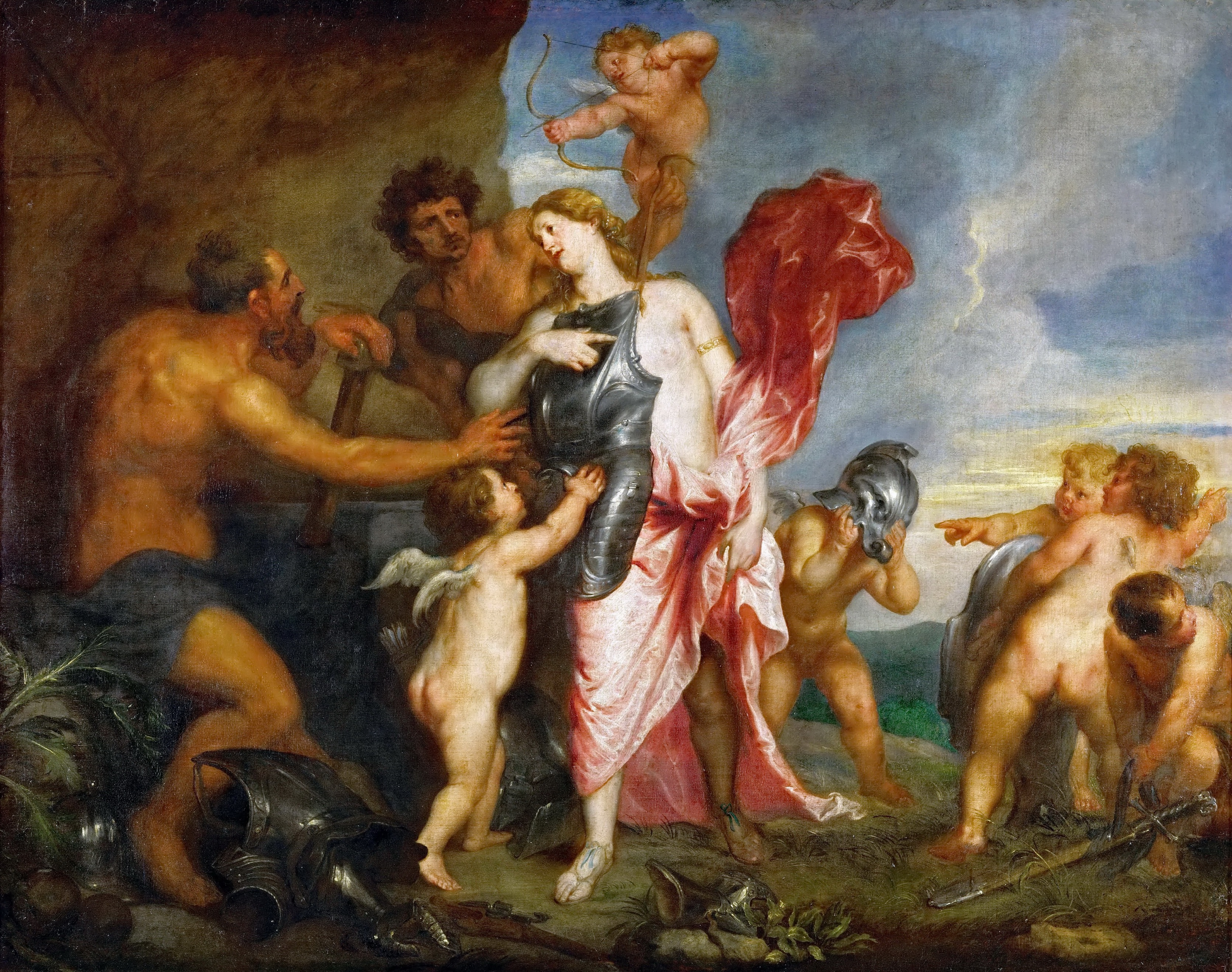
Thetis Receiving the Weapons of Achilles from Hephaestus by Anthony van Dyck, 1630–32.

The shield of Achilles can be read in a variety of different ways. One interpretation is that the shield represents a microcosm of civilization, in which all aspects of life are shown. The depiction of law suggests the existence of social order within one city, while feuding armies depict a darker side of humanity. The imagery of nature and the universe also reinforce the belief that the shield is a microcosm of Greek life, as it can be seen as a reflection of their perception of the world. In a poetic and descriptive way, some scholars read it as a summation of the whole of human knowledge in the Homeric era. Also, the sun and the moon are shown shining simultaneously, which some consider representative of a general understanding of the universe and awareness to the cosmological order of life.

The shield shows images of conflict and discord by depicting the shield's layers as a series of contrasts – i.e. war and peace, work and festival. Wolfgang Schadewaldt, a German writer, argues that these intersecting antitheses show the basic forms of a civilized, essentially orderly life. This contrast is also seen as a way of making "us…see [war] in relation to peace".

The images of the shield can also be interpreted as a visual expression of specific themes that were found in corresponding text sections elsewhere in the Iliad and the Odyssey. This suggests symbolic imagery of Achilles' own life and of overcoming both inner and outer enemies, therefore endowing the hero with a special and different power and protection in his second attempt at fulfilling his fate as a warrior – this time with a shield that reveals a diverse, balanced, and more mature imagery than the typical battle shield for example used by Agamemnon, who was bearing a simpler image of a bloody head of the Gorgon Medusa with twisted snakes in place of hair, which projected a less refined but more common form of intimidating brute force in war.

The construction of the shield also allegorises the role of fate in the Iliad. Fate in ancient Greek mythology is unchangeable even by the gods, because it is the three Moirai that spin the destiny of each human life like a thread from the laws of the universe. The description of the shield has been considered a form of foreshadowing, a narrative technique that underlines the inevitability of future events and is used in classical epics. The images on the shield are narrated as cryptic parables linking powerful symbolism (creation and cosmos, origins and destiny, war and peace, life and death, the seasons, urban and agricultural civilization, identity and eternity) with specific predictions regarding events in corresponding verses in the Iliad and Odyssey, therefore not only raising anticipation and suspense in the audience, but also giving the hero Achilles an indication of his own destiny concealed from himself on the very shield that he carries to his fate.
