= Johann Kerseboom =

German painter

- Born: Germany
- Died: 26 October 1708 (Burial), London
- Occupation: Painter
- Known for: Portrait painting
- Relatives: Frederick Kerseboom (uncle)

Johann Kerseboom (died 1708) was a German painter, also called John Kersseboom. His date of birth is not known.

== Life ==
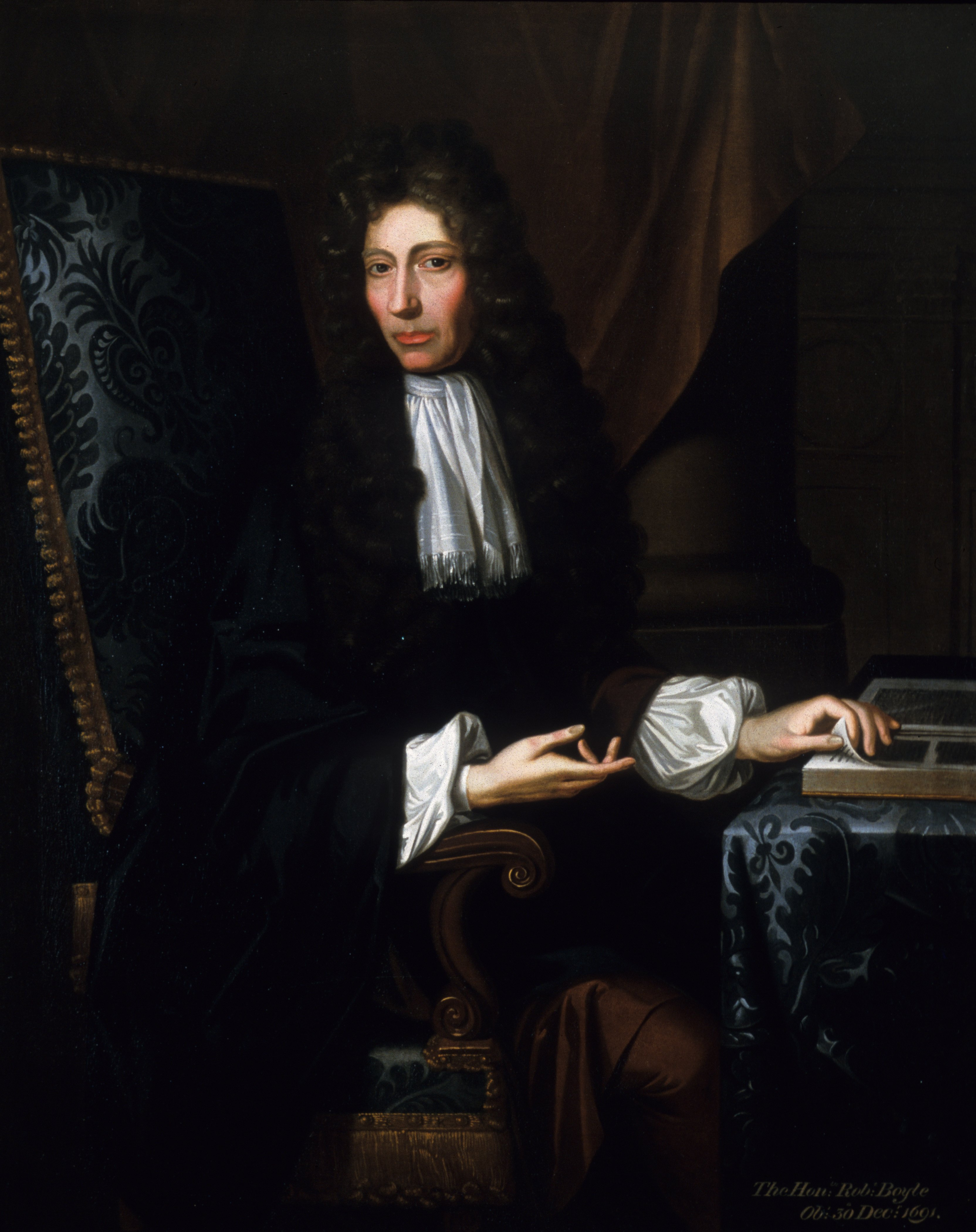
Robert Boyle (1689)

Kerseboom was born as Johann Kirschbaum in Germany, and was the nephew of the painter Frederick Kerseboom. In the 1680s he traveled together with Frederick to England, where he eventually set up his own practice in London. Some of the noted portraits that in the past were attributed to Frederick are now considered to be by him. A number of his portraits were engraved in mezzotint by engravers including John Smith.

He died in London in 1708, and was buried in St Paul's, Covent Garden.
