= Josef Ignaz Mildorfer =

Austrian painter (1719–1775)

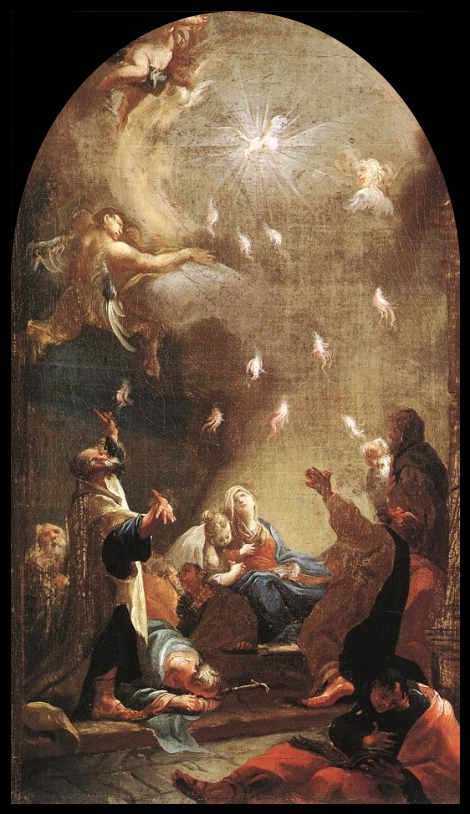
Pentecost byJosef Ignaz Mildorfer, Hungarian National Gallery, 1750s

Josef Ignaz Mildorfer (13 October 1719 – 8 December 1775) was an Austrian painter.

== Biography ==
Mildorfer was born in Innsbruck, and was initially trained by his father Michael Ignaz Mildorfer. He later apprenticed with Paul Troger. In 1745 Mildorfer became a member of the Academy of Fine Arts Vienna, and starting in 1751 taught as a professor of painting. That same year he was appointed court painter to Princess Eleonora of Savoy, where he was commissioned to paint frescoes for the Menagerie Pavilion at Schönbrunn. Mildorfer primarily painted religious-themed altarpieces and frescoes. He died in Vienna in 1775.
