= Claes Lang =

Finnish painter

Claes Lang (1690 – 13 July 1761) was a Finnish painter.

Lang was born in Stockholm, but his family later moved to Finland. His father- Jochim Lang was also a painter who had lived and worked in Åland. He married Catharina Elizabeth Roling, whose family came from Lübeck, just like Lang's early family. Artistic painter jobs do not fully employ the Lang, so he periodically had to paint houses and furniture.

He moved to Turku in 1735 and painted a new city hall. He also painted murals and altarpieces at a number of churches, including in Paimion (1738), Lempäälä, Saltvik (1759), and Lumparland (1760). Lang died in Turku on 13 July 1761.
