= Michael Ignaz Mildorfer =

Austrian painter

Michael Ignaz Mildorfer (1690–1747) was an Austrian painter.

== Biography ==
Mildorfer was born in Innsbruck, County of Tyrol and later trained his son Josef Ignaz Mildorfer to become a painter as well. Mildorfer painted primarily religious themed works.
