= Temptation of St. Thomas (Velázquez) =

Painting by Diego Velázquez

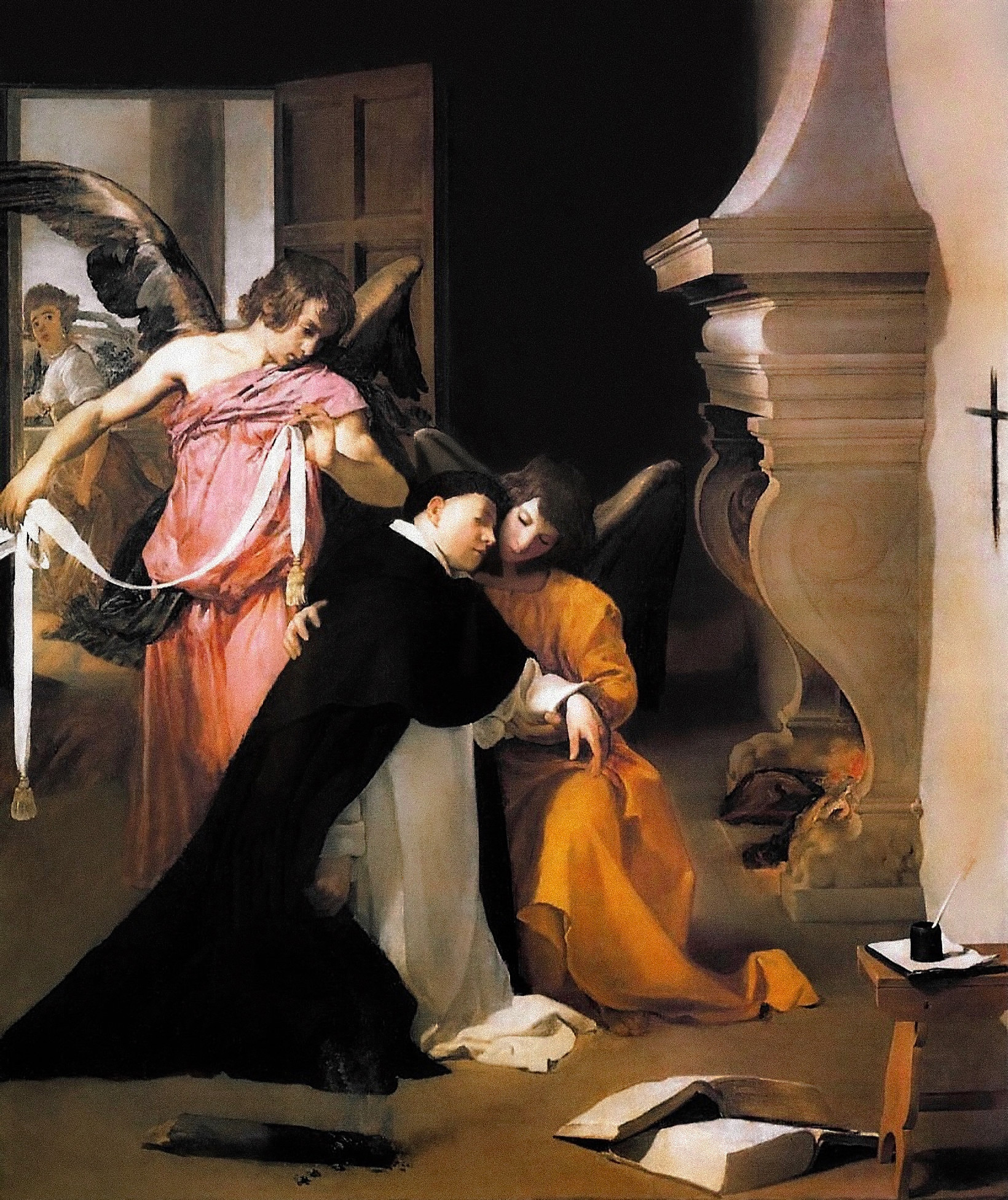
- Artist: Diego Velázquez
- Year: 1632
- Medium: Oil on canvas
- Dimensions: 244 cm × 203 cm (96 in × 80 in)
- Location: Cathedral Museum of Sacred Art; Orihuela

The Temptation of St. Thomas is a painting by the Spanish Baroque painter Diego Velázquez, executed in 1632 and housed in the Museum of Sacred Art of Orihuela Cathedral, southern Spain.

The work, for a period, was attributed to Murcian painter Nicolás de Villacis, until it was recognized as Velázquez's in the 1920s. It portrays the episode of the life of Saint Thomas Aquinas when, as a novice, he resisted the temptation represented by a prostitute, who is visible in the background door. The saint is held by an angel, while another is preparing to dress him with a white ribbon, representing chastity.

Temptation of St. Thomas is among Velázquez's better-known paintings.

== See also ==
- List of works by Diego Velázquez

== Sources ==
- Velázquez, Catálogo de la Exposición. Museo del Prado. 1990.
