= Orihuela Cathedral =

Church in Orihuela, Spain

Coordinates: 38°05′09″N 0°56′45″W

Orihuela Cathedral Catedral de Orihuela
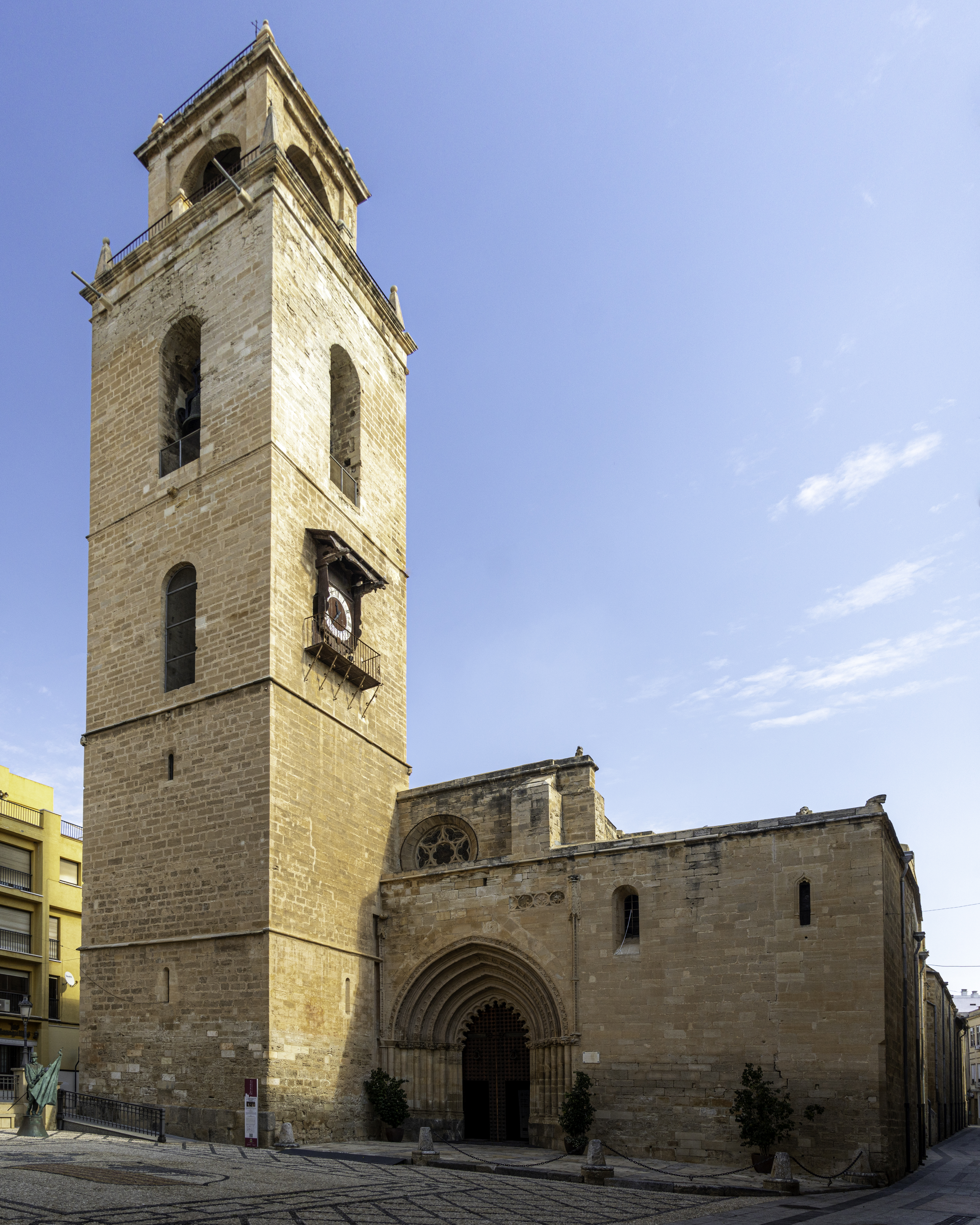
- Main façade.

Religion
- Affiliation: Roman Catholic Church

Location
- Location: Orihuela, Spain
- Interactive map of Orihuela Cathedral; Catedral de Orihuela

Architecture
- Type: Church
- Style: Valencian Gothic, Renaissance, Baroque

Orihuela Cathedral (Catedral de Orihuela) is the main Roman Catholic church of Orihuela, Valencian Community, southern Spain.

== History ==
It was built above a pre-existing Muslim mosque as a simple parish church and was later converted into main church by order of King Alfonso X of Castile in 1281. In 1413, pope Benedict XIII elevated it to the rank of collegiate, until it became a cathedral in 1510.

Construction was begun in the late 13th century in Valencian Gothic style, with a Latin cross plan including a nave and two aisles, an ambulatory and chapels within buttresses. The crossing, the late-Gothic great chapel, and the ambulatory are 15th century-early 16th century additions, including the removal of two pillars of the nave to obtain a taller vault at the crossing, after a design by Pere Compte.

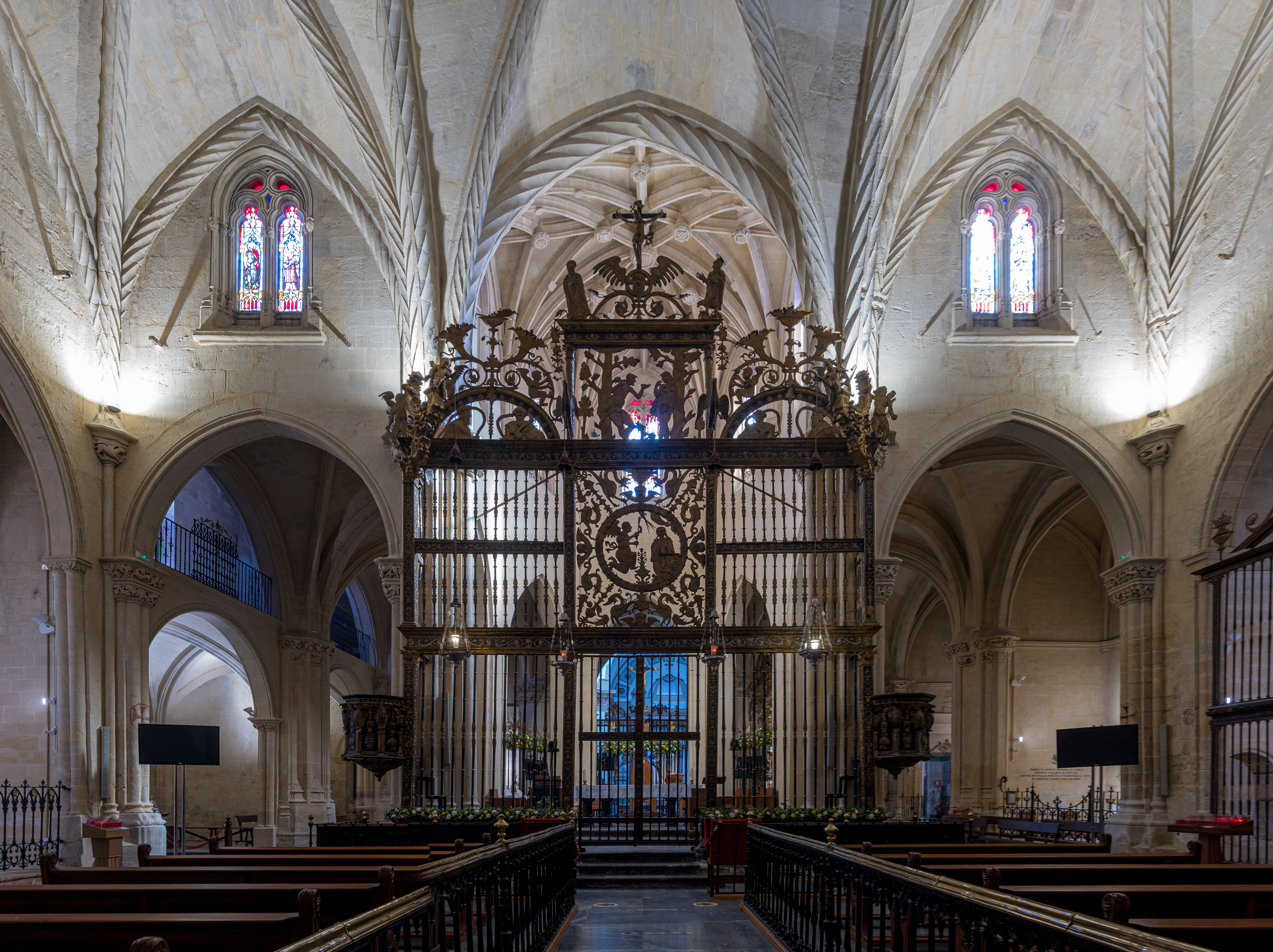
Interior

The interior receives little light due to the small size of the windows. There are three entrances: the Puerta de las Cadenas (Portal of the Chains, 14th century) is in Islamic style, the Puerta de Loreto (mid-15th century) is Gothic, and Gate of the Annunciation (at the north, built in 1588 by Juan Inglés), in Renaissance-style triumphal arch-shape. Other Renaissance elements include the stalls and the grills of the choir, and the cloister (originally from 1377, but rebuilt until 1560). The oldest part is the bell tower, which dates from late 12th-mid 14th centuries. It has four floors covered by groin vaults.

Annexed to the church is a museum of Sacred Art, housing works by Diego Velázquez (Temptation of St. Thomas), Vicente López Portaña, José de Ribera, Juan de Juanes, Francisco Salzillo and other artists.

The large organ is from the Baroque renovation, and was realized in 1733 by Valencian craftsmen.

== Sources ==
- Sebastián, Santiago (1986). El Coro de la catedral de Orihuela. Valencia: Institució Alfons el Magnànim. ISBN 84-505-4788-1.
