= The Blind Sculptor =

1632 painting by Jusepe de Ribera

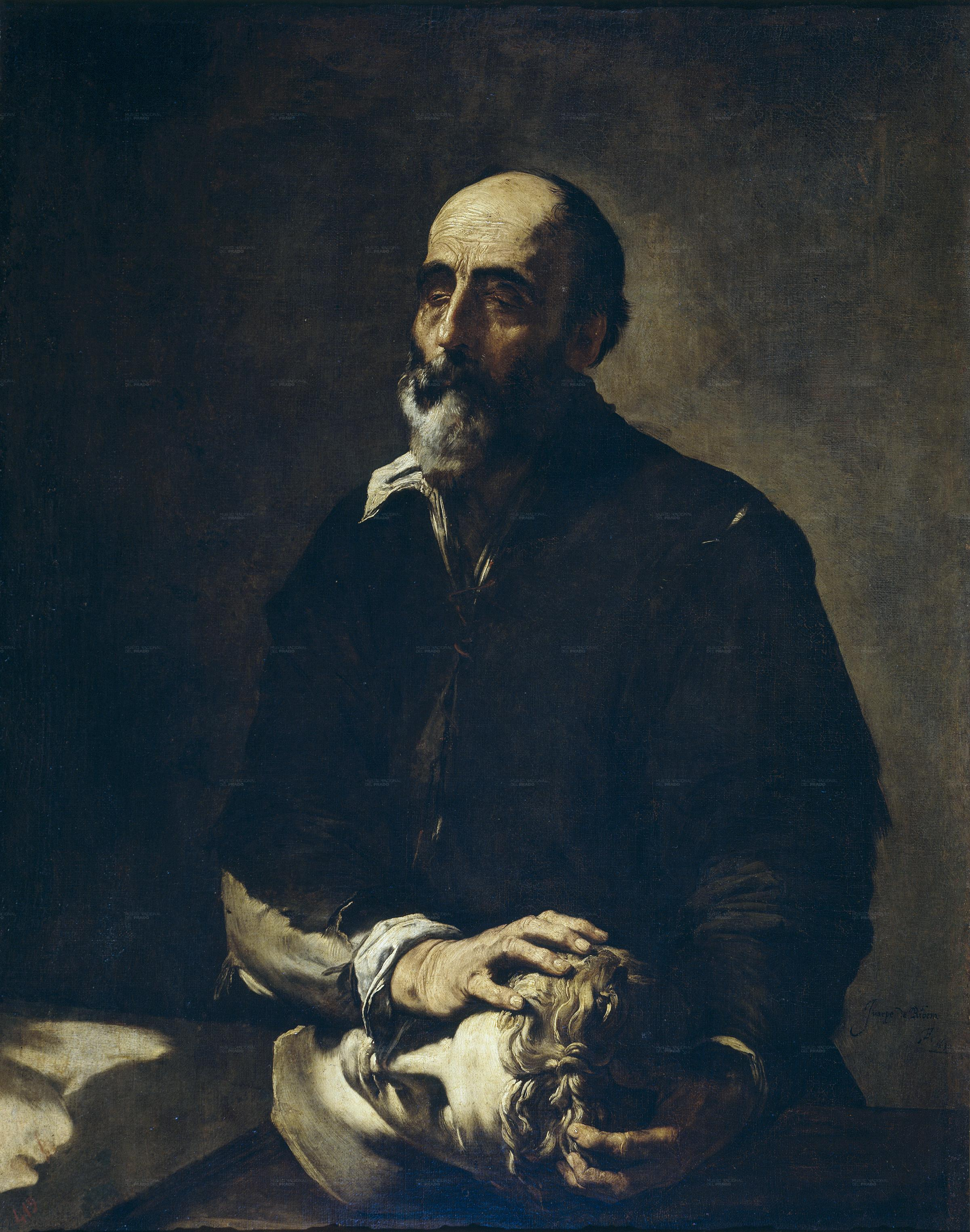
The Blind Sculptor (1632) by Jusepe de Ribera

The Blind Sculptor is an oil on canvas painting by Jusepe de Ribera, signed and dated to 1632. Its origins are unknown - the first documentary reference to the work is a 1764 inventory of the collections at El Escorial, from which it moved to its present home at the Prado Museum in 1837.

The work is traditionally known as The Blind Man of Gambazzo, since it was previously thought to have been a portrait of the blind sculptor Giovanni Gonnelli, but this theory has now been rejected as that artist was only thirty years old when the work was painted and its subject is visibly older than that. There is also a theory that it shows the blind philosopher Carneades who was able to recognise the god Pan simply by touching the head of a statue, but the most likely theory is that it should be entitled Allegory of Touch as part of a series of works showing the five senses
