= Thetis Receiving the Weapons of Achilles from Hephaestus =

Painting by the workshop of Anthony van Dyck

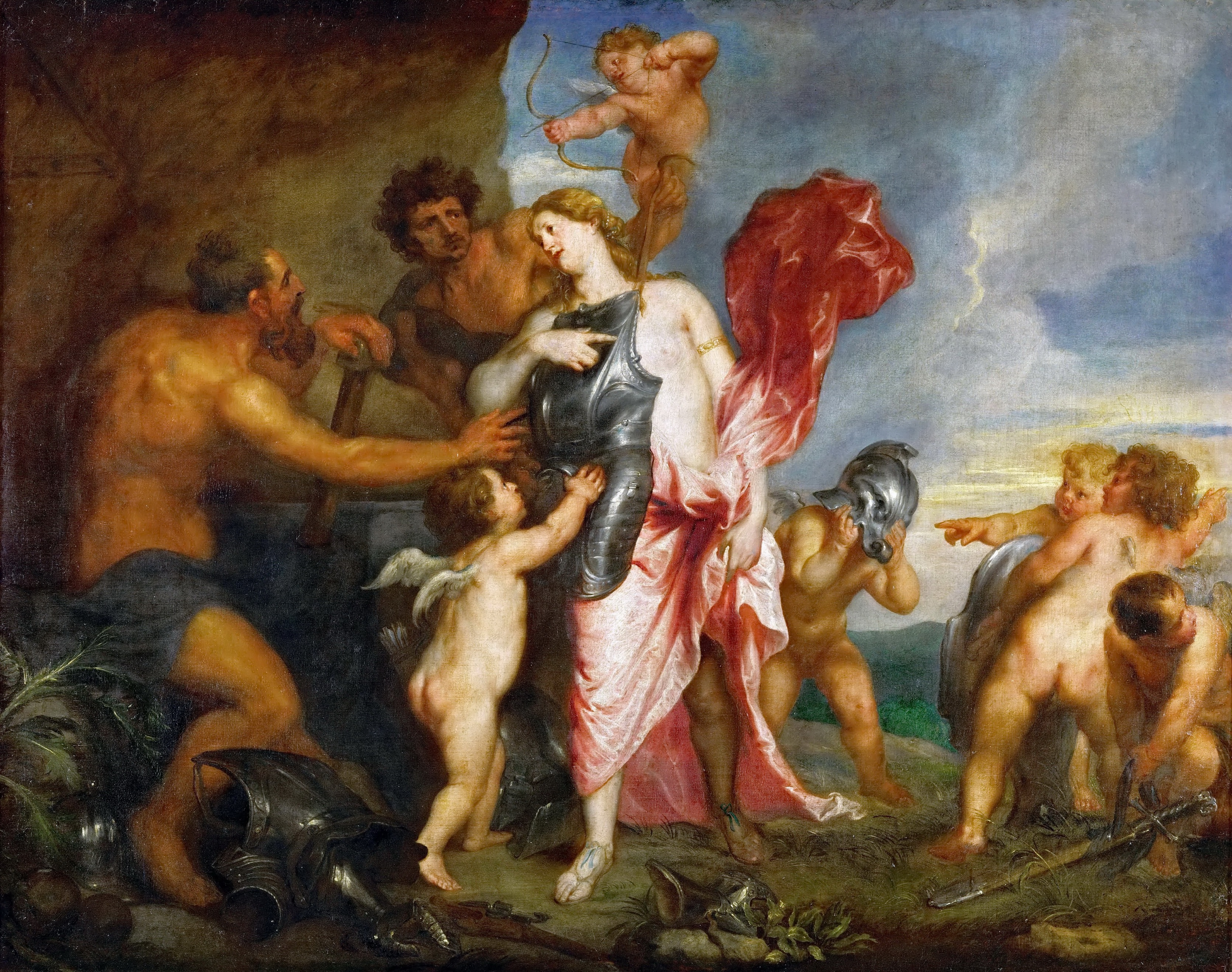

Thetis Receiving the Weapons of Achilles from Hephaestus is a 1630–1632 painting in the workshop of the Flemish painter Anthony van Dyck. It was acquired by Archduke Leopold Wilhelm of Austria and is now in the Kunsthistorisches Museum in Vienna. It illustrates the story of the Shield of Achilles, from the Iliad, Book 18, lines 478–608, in which Thetis requests replacement weapons and shield for her son Achilles from Hephaestus.

== See also ==
- List of paintings by Anthony van Dyck
