= Wang Wu (painter) =

Chinese painter and poet (1632–1690)

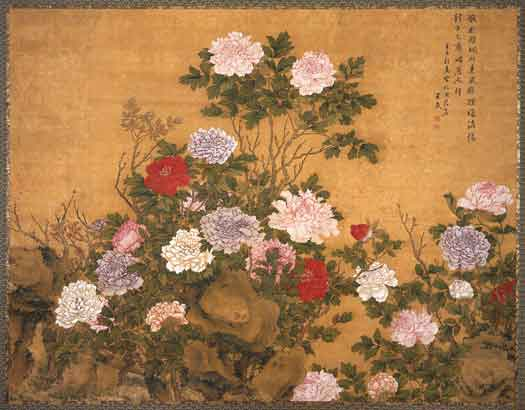
Wang Wu, Peonies, 1672, ink and pigment on silk. The Trammell & Margaret Crow Collection of Asian Art, Dallas.

Wang Wu (Chinese: 王武; pinyin: Wáng Wǔ; Wade–Giles: Wang^{2} Wu^{3}; 1632–1690) was a Chinese painter and poet during the Qing Dynasty (1644–1912).

Wang was born in the province of Jiangsu, in the region of Wu. His courtesy name was Qingzhong (勤中), and his art names were Xuedian Daoren (雪顛道人) and Wang'an (忘庵). Wang specialized in bird-and-flower painting, using a brilliant and minute style. Unlike many painters of the time, Wang was not affiliated with any school of painting.
