= Frederick Kerseboom =

German painter

- Born: Solingen, Germany
- Died: 25 July 1690 (Burial), London
- Occupation: Painter
- Known for: Portrait painting
- Relatives: Johann Kerseboom (nephew)

Frederick Kerseboom (c.1632 – buried 25 July 1690) was a German painter, only one time called Casaubon (mistaking) in England.

== Life ==
Born as Friedrich Kirschbaum at Solingen in Germany, he studied painting in Amsterdam, where he changed his name, and in 1650 was at Paris, where he worked under Charles Le Brun. He subsequently went to Rome, and remained there for 14 years, two of which he spent under Nicolas Poussin.

On leaving Rome Kerseboom came to England, where he devoted himself to portrait-painting. He died in London in 1690, and was buried in St Andrew's Church, Holborn.

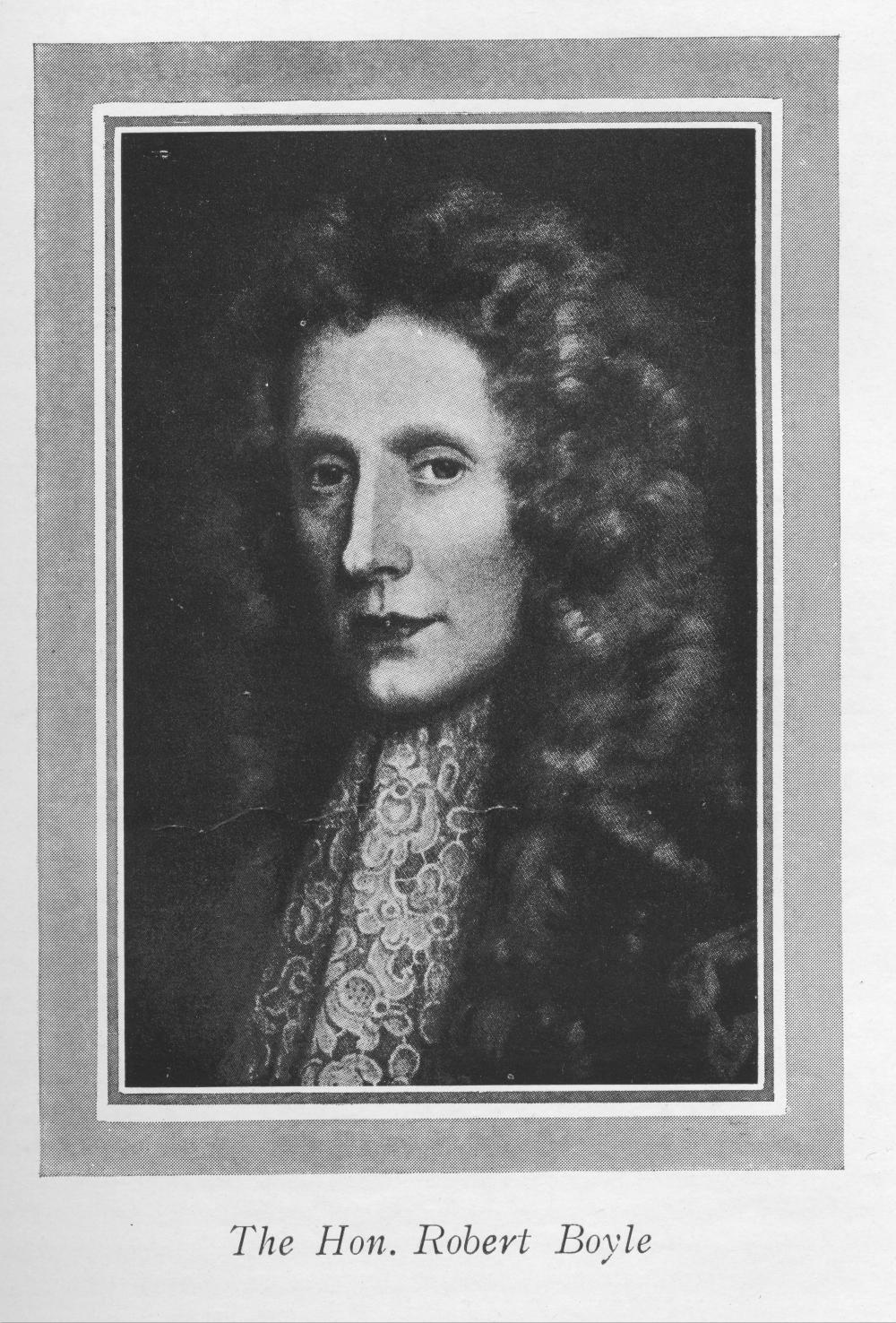
Robert Boyle, from Arthur Shuster & Arthur E. Shipley´s "Britain´s Heritage of Science", London, 1917. Based on a painting by Frederick Kerseboom

== Family ==
Johann Kerseboom was the nephew of Frederick, and together they came to England. Some of the noted portraits that in the past were attributed to the uncle are now considered to be by him.

== Notes ==
Attribution

This article incorporates text from a publication now in the public domain: Lee, Sidney, ed. (1892). "Kerseboom, Frederick". Dictionary of National Biography. Vol. 31. London: Smith, Elder & Co.
