= 1777 in art =

Events from the year 1777 in art.

== Events ==
- 24 April – The Royal Academy Exhibition of 1777 opens in Pall Mall in London
- 25 August – The Salon of 1777 opens at the Louvre in Paris
- The Cane Tago, a terracotta statue of a dog by Luigi Acquisti, commissioned by an Italian nobleman to commemorate his own pet Weimaraner, is erected in Bologna, Italy.
- The Kunsthochschule Kassel is founded in Germany.
- Det Dramatiske Selskab is founded in Copenhagen (Denmark) as an acting academy.

== Works ==
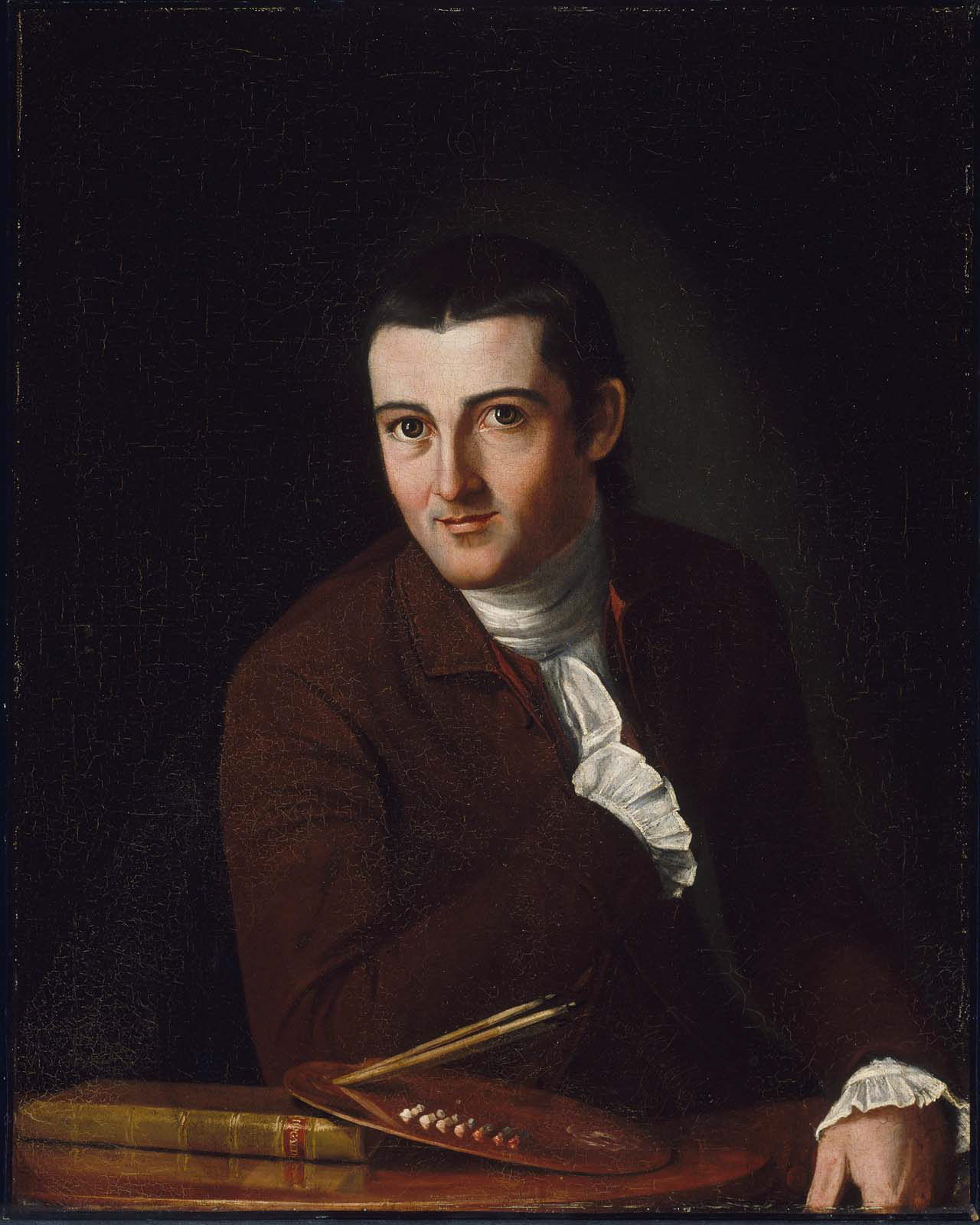
John Trumbull's self-portrait

- Antonio Carnicero – Portrait of Pedro Rodríguez, Conde de Campomanes
- John Singleton Copley – The Copley Family
- Nathaniel Dance-Holland – Portrait of Arthur Murphy
- Thomas Gainsborough
  - Portrait of Mary Gainsborough
  - Pomeranian Bitch and Puppy ("Two Fox Dogs" – approximate date)
  - The Watering Place
- Francisco Goya – The Parasol (tapestry cartoon – approximate date)
- Jean-Baptiste Greuze – Portrait of Benjamin Franklin
- William Hoare – Portrait of Christopher Anstey with his daughter
- Ozias Humphry – Portrait of George Stubbs
- Philip James de Loutherbourg – Moonlight
- Joshua Reynolds
  - A Fortune-Teller
  - Portrait of Lady Bampfylde
  - Portrait of Henry Thrale
- John Francis Rigaud – Agostino Carlini, Francesco Bartolozzi and Giovanni Battista Cipriani
- George Romney – The Gower Family: The Children of Granville, 2nd Earl Gower
- Alexander Roslin – Portraits of
  - Ivan Betskoy
  - Catherine the Great
  - Natalya Golitsyna
  - Gustavus III of Sweden
- John Trumbull – Self-portrait
- John Webber – The Tahitian Princess Poedua, the daughter of Orio, Chief of Raiatea
- Benjamin West – Portrait of Sir Thomas Beauchamp-Proctor

== Births ==
- January 2 – Christian Daniel Rauch, German sculptor (died 1857)
- January 7 – Lorenzo Bartolini, Italian sculptor (died 1850)
- March 9 – Aleksander Orłowski, Polish painter and sketch maker, pioneer of lithography in the Russian Empire (died 1832)
- March 10 – Louis Hersent, French painter (died 1860)
- March 13 – John Bacon, English sculptor (died 1859)
- June 20 – Jean-Eugène-Charles Alberti, Dutch painter working primarily in Paris (died 1843)
- June 22 (bapt.) – John Thirtle, English watercolour painter and frame-maker (died 1839)
- July 23 – Philipp Otto Runge, German painter (died 1810)
- August 11 – Giuseppe Bossi, Italian painter, arts administrator and writer on art (died 1815)
- October 15 – Christian David Gebauer, Danish animal painter and etcher (died 1831)
- October 16 – J. L. Lund, Danish painter especially of historical subjects (died 1867)
- November 1 – Per Krafft the Younger, Swedish portrait and historical painter (died 1863)
- December 15 – Agostino Aglio, Italian painter, decorator, and engraver (died 1857)
- December 17 – François Marius Granet, French painter (died 1849)
- date unknown
  - George Bullock, English sculptor (died 1818)
  - Gustaf Erik Hedman, Finnish painter (died 1841)
  - Matthew Cotes Wyatt, English painter and sculptor (died 1862)

== Deaths ==
- April 29 – Antonio Joli, Italian painter of veduta (born 1700)
- May 21 – John Cleveley the Elder, English marine artist (born 1712)
- June 22 – Johann Joseph Christian, German Baroque sculptor and woodcarver (born 1706)
- July 13 – Guillaume Coustou the Younger, French painter (born 1716)
- August 23 – Charles-Joseph Natoire, French rococo painter (born 1700)
- November 17 - Johan Stålbom, Finnish painter who later lived and worked in Sweden (born 1712)
- December 2 – Lorenzo De Caro, Neapolitan Baroque painter (born 1719)
- December 5 – Claude François Devosge, French sculptor and architect (born 1697)
- date unknown
  - Jean Charles Baquoy, French engraver (born 1721)
  - Pierre-Charles Canot, French engraver who spent most of his career in England (born 1710)
- probable
  - Nicholas Thomas Dall, Danish landscape painter (date of birth unknown)
  - Francesco Pavona, Italian painter primarily of pastel portraits (born 1695)
