= Lydia (painting) =

Painting by William Peters

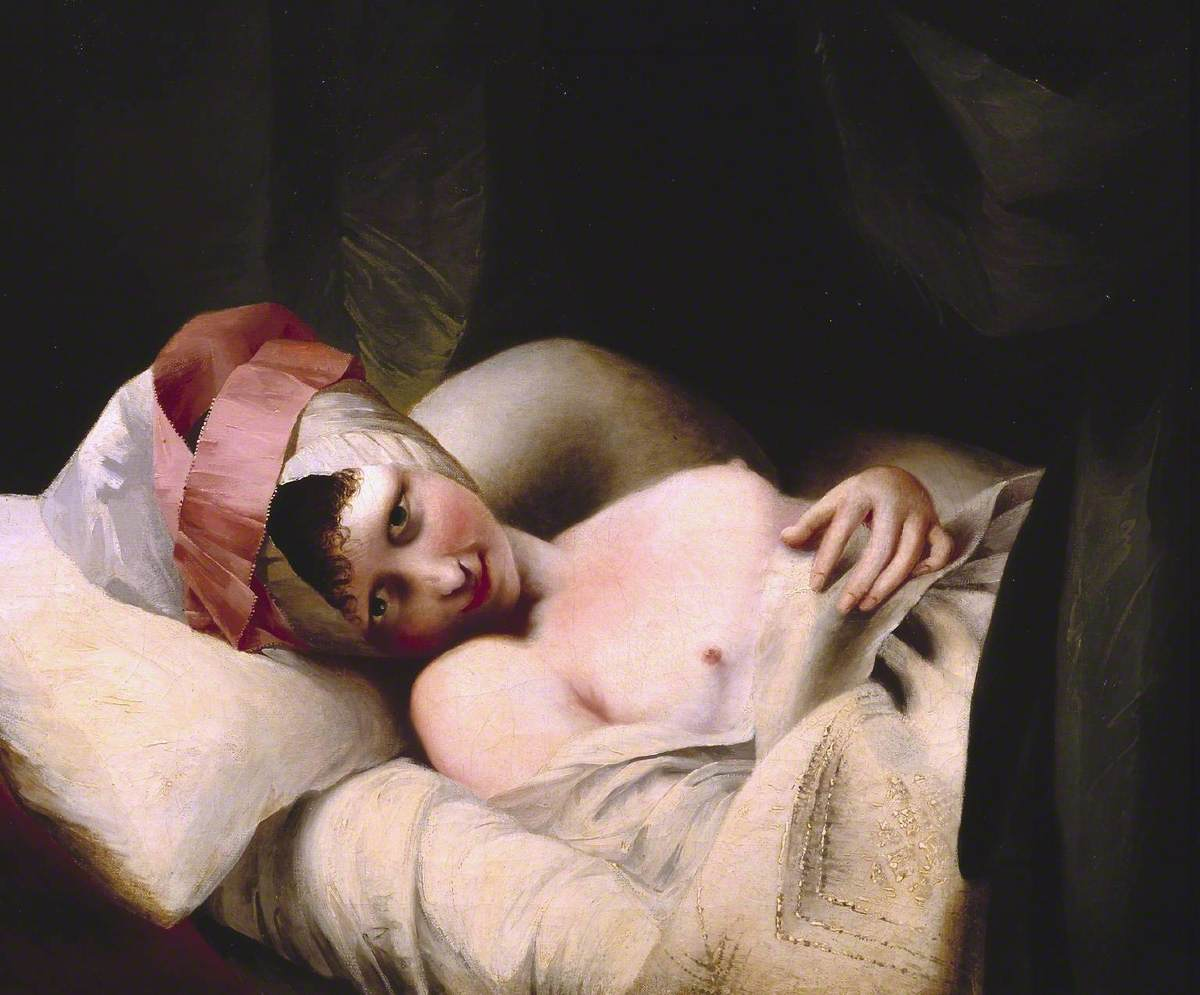
- Artist: William Peters
- Year: 1777
- Type: Oil on canvas, genre painting
- Dimensions: 77 cm × 64.2 cm (30 in × 25.3 in)
- Location: Tate Britain, London

Lydia is a 1777 oil painting by the British artist William Peters. It depicts a young woman, often considered to be a courtesan laying topless in bed. The painting was displayed at the Royal Academy Exhibition of 1777 held in Pall Mall where it attracted significant attention with many treating it as a form of erotic art despite the tradition of nudes being displayed.

It was turned into an mezzotint by the engraver William Dickinson even before it featured at the Royal Academy. Peters subsequently became an Anglican clergyman in 1781 and came to regret pictures such as this he had previously produced. The original painting is now in the collection of the Tate Britain in Pimlico, having been purchased in 1986.

== Bibliography ==
- Manners, Victoria. Matthew William Peters, R. A. His Life and Work. Connoisseur, 1913.
