= Fidelia and Speranza =

Painting by Benjamin West

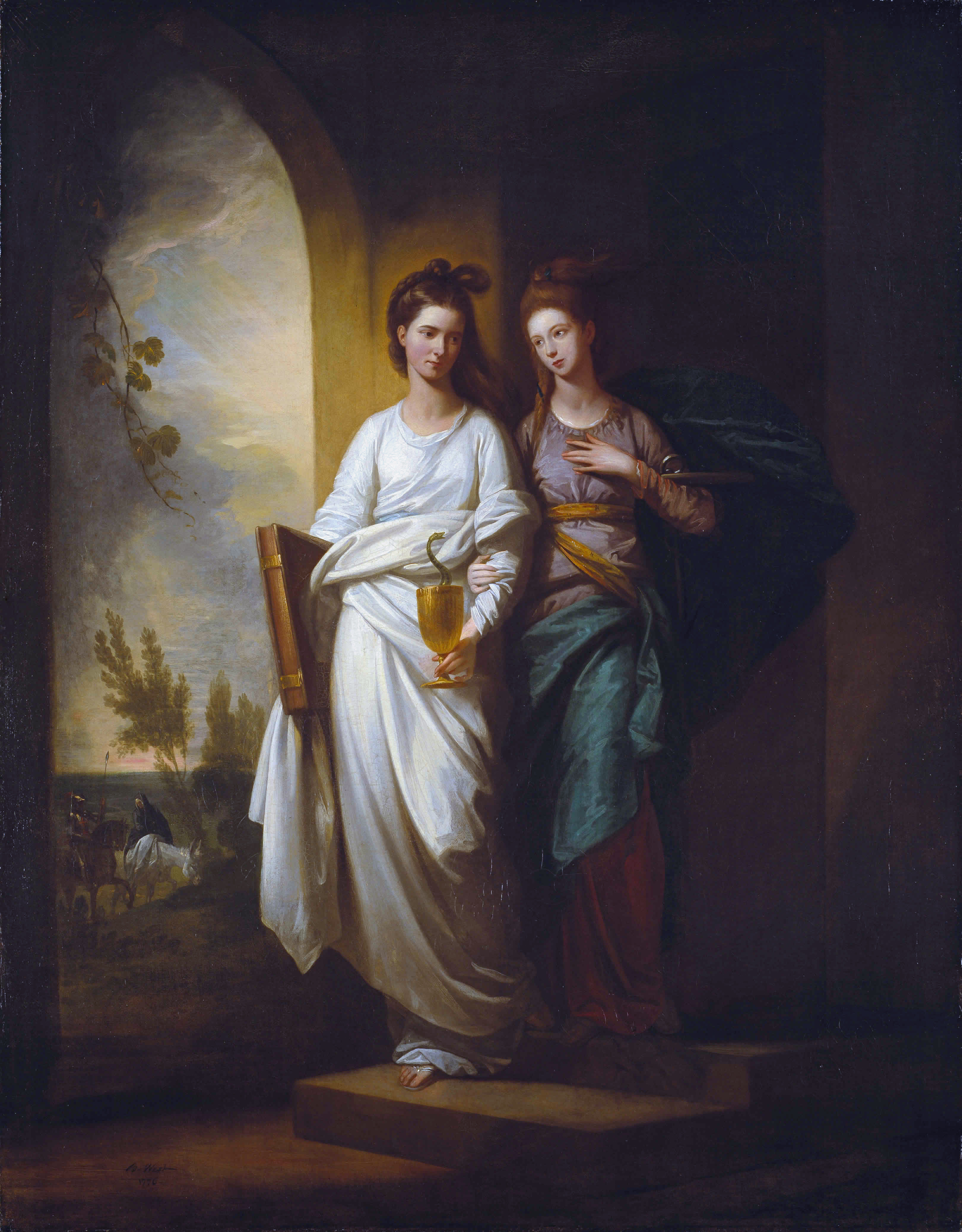
- Artist: Benjamin West
- Year: 1776
- Medium: oil on canvas
- Dimensions: 136.5 cm × 108.3 cm (53.7 in × 42.6 in)
- Location: Timken Museum of Art, San Diego, California, U.S.

Fidelia and Speranza is a 1776 painting by Benjamin West. It is a neoclassical depiction of a scene from the poem The Faerie Queene by Edmund Spenser. It was displayed at the Royal Academy Exhibition of 1777 in London.

== Subject and analysis ==
The neoclassical style oil on canvas painting Fidelia and Speranza portrays a scene from the epic poem The Faerie Queene, written by Edmund Spenser. Together Fidelia, representing faith, is holding the New Testament while her sister Speranza; representing hope, wait at the entry of the House of Holiness for the arrival of the Red Cross Knight. The knight, representing humanity, is lead through the ominous landscape by Una who represents the church. West depicts the two sisters in classical dress. Their elegant gestures and graceful contrapposto reveal West's, an American, admiration of the classical sculpture and artwork of the European old masters.

The central focus of the painting are the two sisters elevated on the stairway. West’s uses the lines from the sister’s tilted heads down to the landing, upon which they stand, to create the traditional pyramid structure that subtlety states the stability and eternal truth of the Christian virtues faith and hope. The high contrast of dark and light color throughout the painting emphasizes the battle between good and evil in humanity. This is represented in the opposing colors of the Red Cross Knight and Una’s horses, as well as, the growing light in the sky illuminating the doorway of the House of Holiness in contrast to the dark interior. The artist makes special note of the impending light overcoming the sky by reflecting it in the eyes of Speranza who is facing the doorway versus Fildelia’s subdued eyes that are turned away from the entry. The brightest color is the iridescent white of Fidelia’s robe, likely the source of the radiance surrounding her head and symbolizes the purity of faith. Again in contrast to her sister’s light purple or violet dress that is covered by a blue-green robe and bound by an orange sash. The violet color represents numerous religious ideals, such as, The Sacrament of Penance and Reconciliation and furthers the spiritual context of the piece. The foreground shows a landscape partially covered by dark clouds that are receding, almost as if the fluffy bright white clouds are pushing them off of the canvas edge. This artistic impression coincides with the humanity and the church, represented by knight and Una, approach toward the House of Holiness suggesting a new dawn is upon humanity for allowing divine intervention to present it sanctified enlightenment.

Fidelia and Speranza is full of biblical references, for example the white robe represents truth, holiness and purity. The external nature of these ideals and the historical setting of the poem are best illustrated in the artist’s choice of classical dress for the sisters. The sacramental cup filled with wine, could also be the chalice of St. John. He was known to have miraculously changed a chalice of poisoned wine into a serpent. Also the serpent is symbolical of healing, something the Red Cross Knight seeks from the sisters. Most notable Speranza’s holding of an anchor most likely is a direct reference to the bible scripture Hebrews 6:19 that reads, “We have this hope as an anchor for the soul, firm and secure. It enters the inner sanctuary behind the curtain.” The painting’s narrative closely follows stanzas twelve through fourteen of book 1, canto 10 of The Faerie Queen. It depicts the spiritual entity Una leading the sinning knight to the House of Holiness where his healing and conversion take place. The willingness of the sinful knight to allow the spiritual Una to lead him to Christian virtues demonstrates how mortal man can find spiritual redemption and salvation through religious conviction. The first people to meet him are sisters Fidelia and Speranza symbolizing the virtues of faith and hope.
