= Royal Academy Exhibition of 1777 =

1777 art exhibition in London

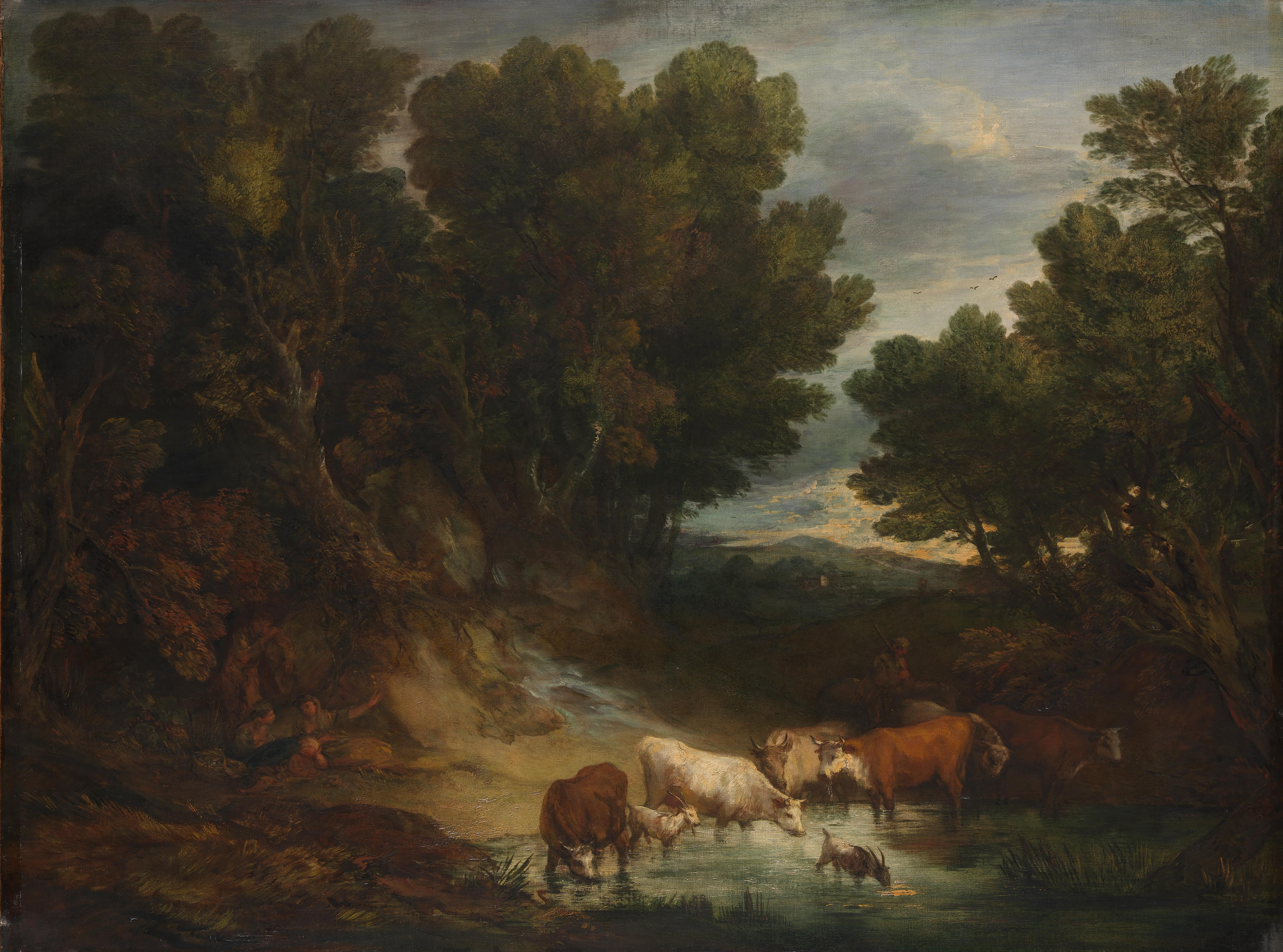
The Watering Place by Thomas Gainsborough

The Royal Academy Exhibition of 1777 was an art exhibition held in London from 24 April to 29 May 1777. It was the ninth annual Summer Exhibition of the British Royal Academy of Arts and took place at Pall Mall. It featured submissions from top artists and architects of the Georgian era and was held during the American War of Independence, although it did not feature paintings of the conflict as a major theme.

The exhibition was notable for the return of Thomas Gainsborough who had been boycotting the Academy since 1773, despite having been a founder member. His submissions were generally compared favourably to those of the President of the Royal Academy Sir Joshua Reynolds. Gainsborough's proto-Romantic landscape The Watering Place won widespread praise and Horace Walpole described it as "the finest landscape ever painted in England". His portraits included the composer Carl Friedrich Abel and his Portrait of Mary Graham. Gainsborough also displayed pendant full-length portraits of the King's younger brother Henry, Duke of Cumberland and his wife Anne Horton whose wedding had led to the passing of the Royal Marriages Act.

The American John Singleton Copley exhibited a group portrait of his relatives The Copley Family. William Hodges displayed landscape paintings based on his experiences accompanying the Second voyage of James Cook. Angelica Kauffmann showed five paintings including Maria Near Moulines based on Laurence Sterne's Sentimental Journey. Amongst the works displayed by Joshua Reynolds was a full-length portrait of the Countess of Derby commissioned by her husband the Twelfth Earl, which was later destroyed by him when she left him. In general Reynolds faced a number of partisan attacks over the quality of his output, notably from Henry Bate Dudley.

== Gallery ==
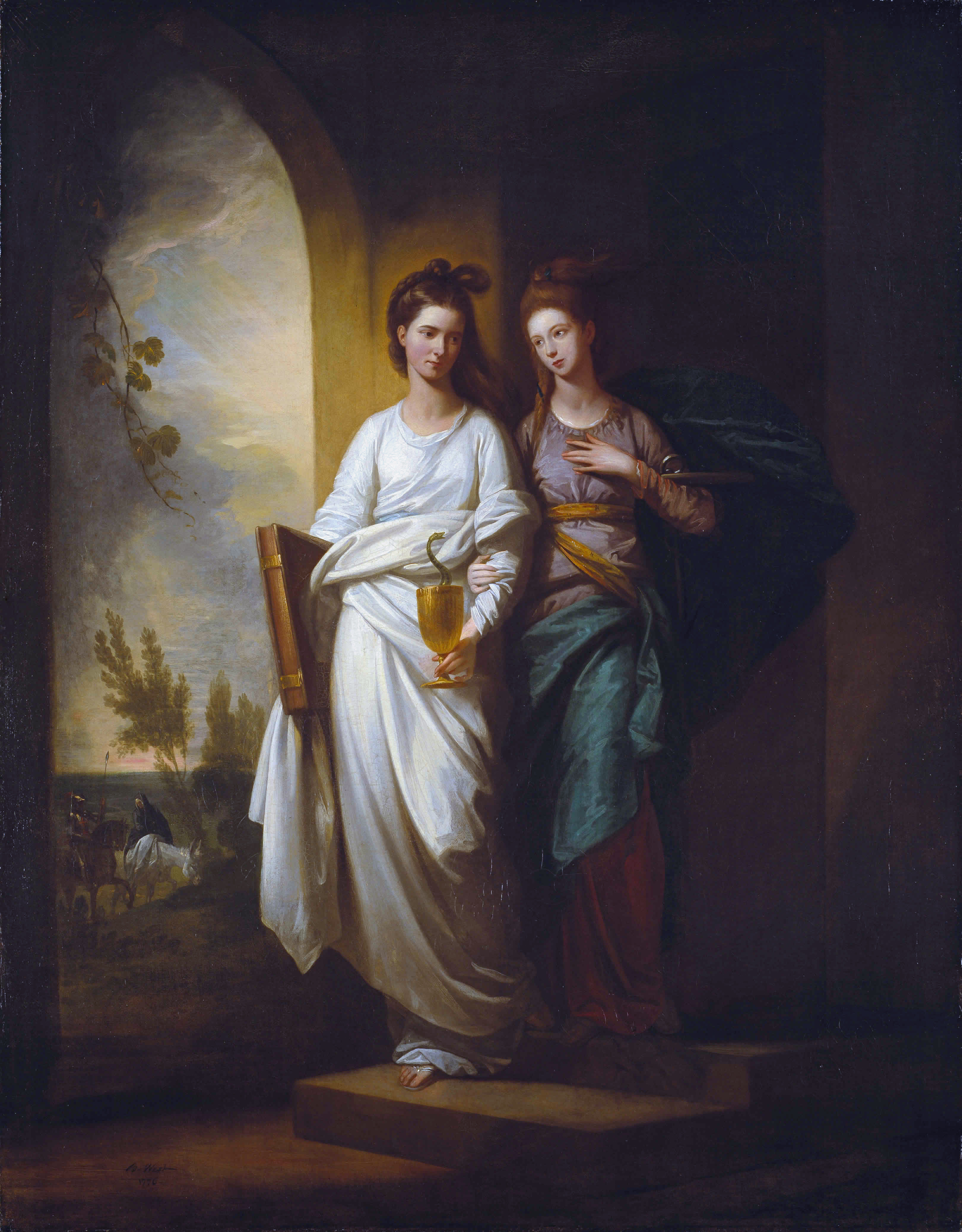
Fidelia and Speranza by Benjamin West

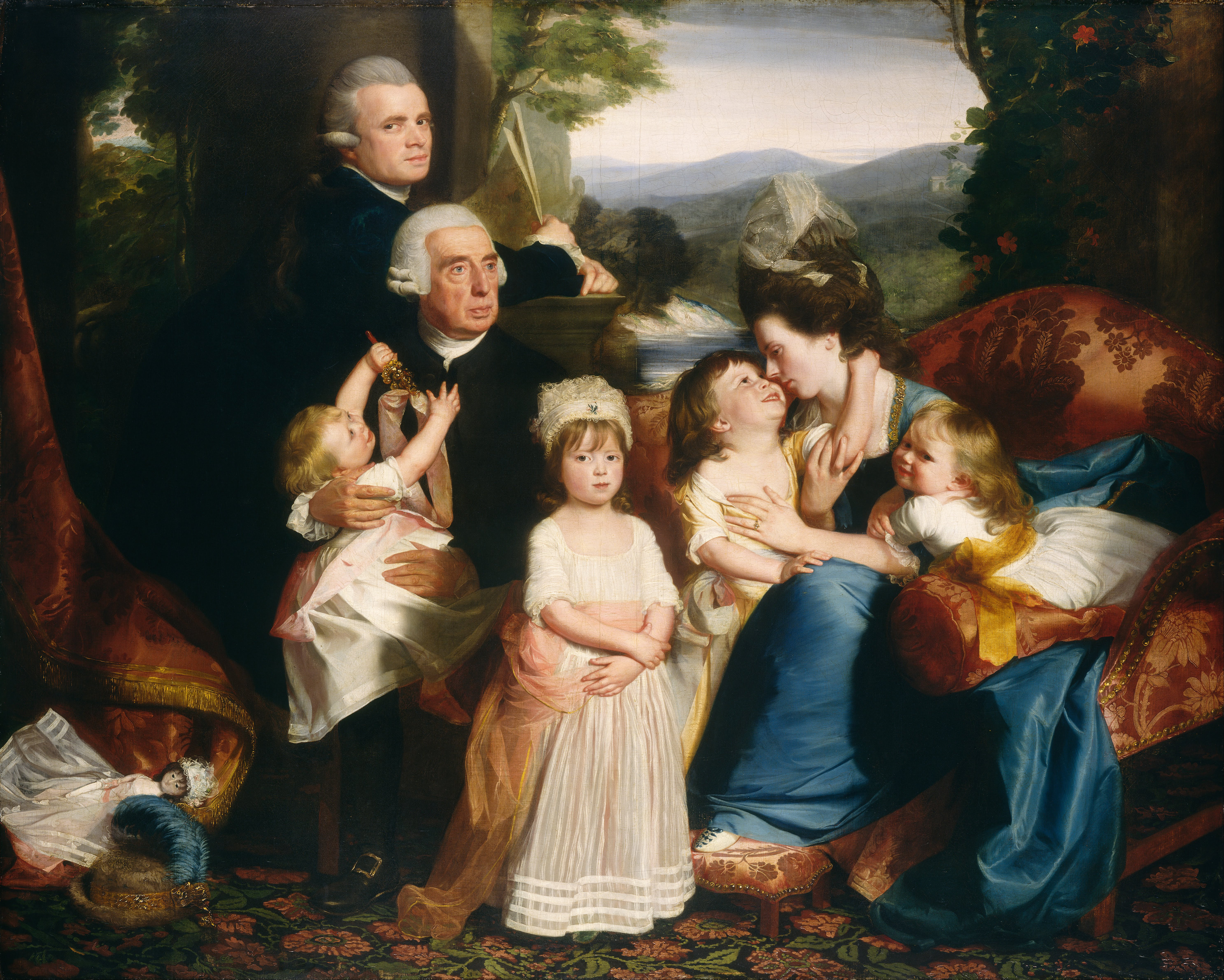
The Copley Family by John Singleton Copley

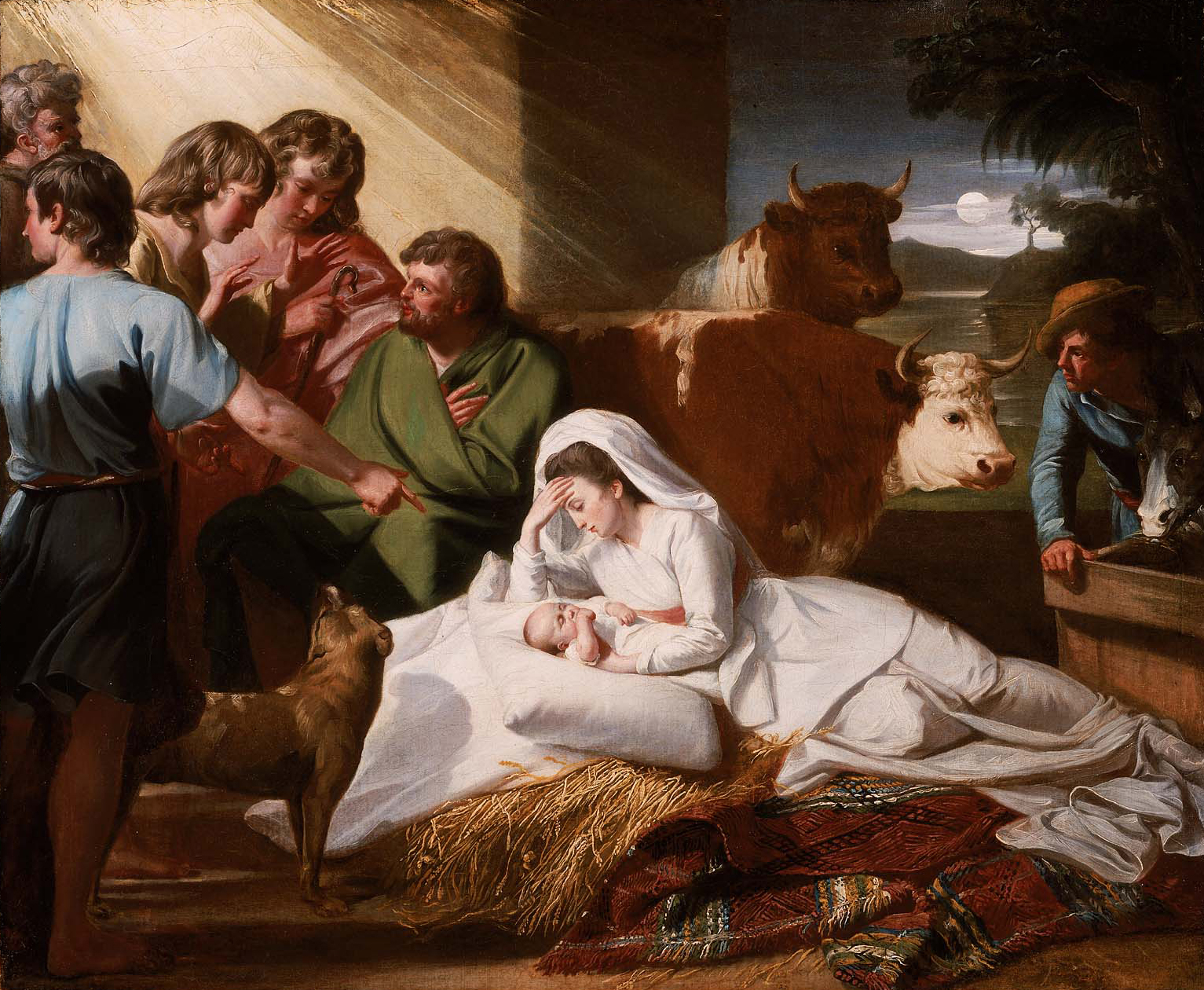
The Nativity by John Singleton Copley

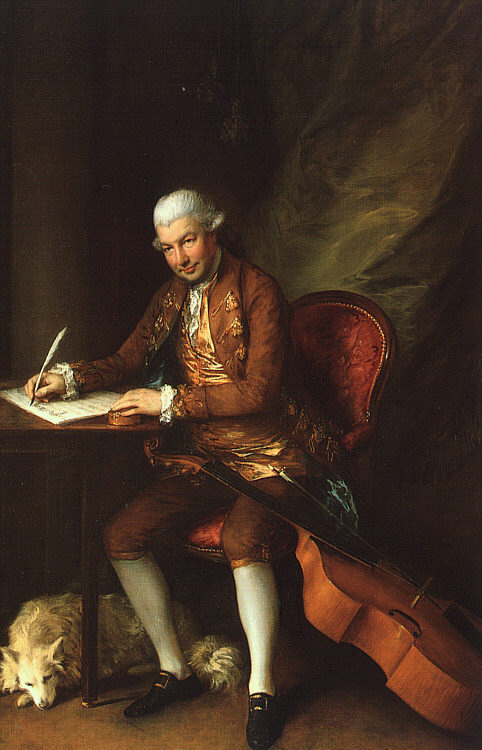
Portrait of Carl Friedrich Abel by Thomas Gainsborough

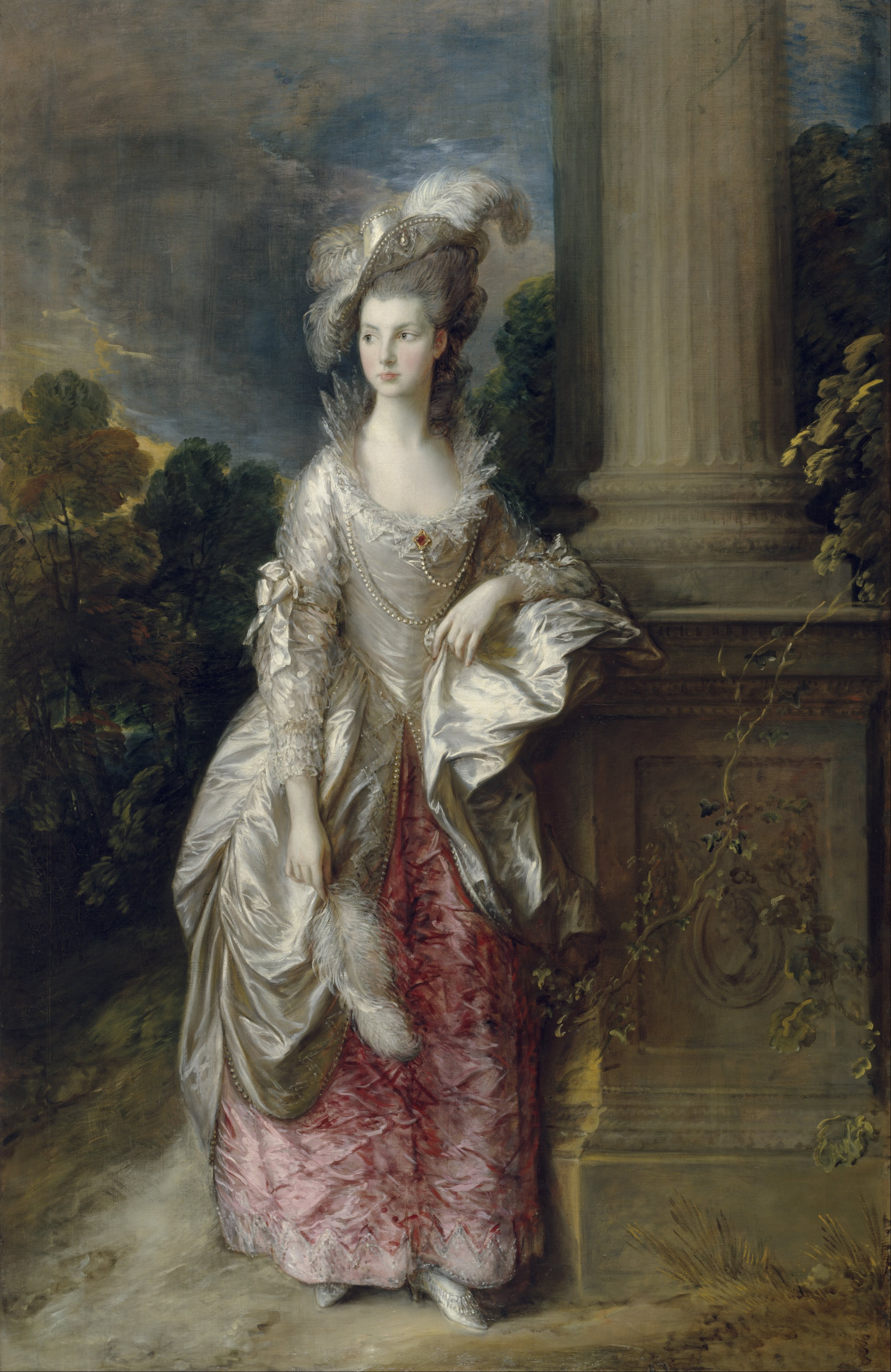
Portrait of Mary Graham by Thomas Gainsborough

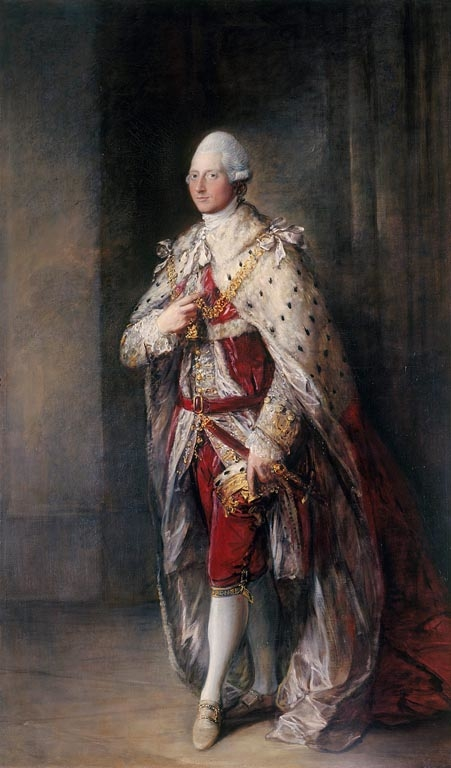
Portrait of the Duke of Cumberland by Thomas Gainsborough

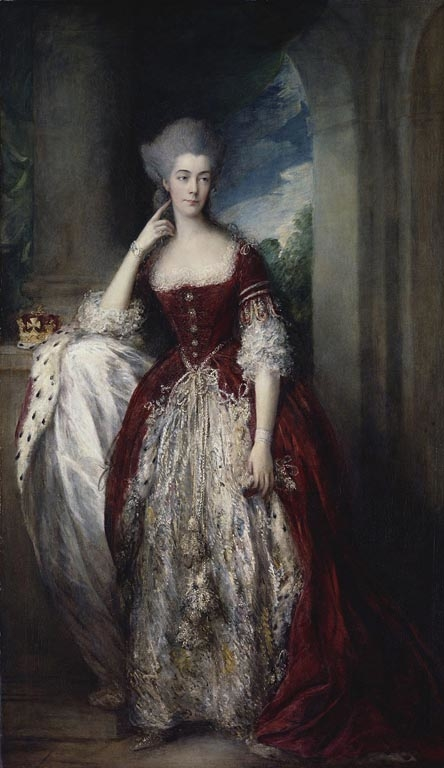
Portrait of the Duchess of Cumberland by Thomas Gainsborough

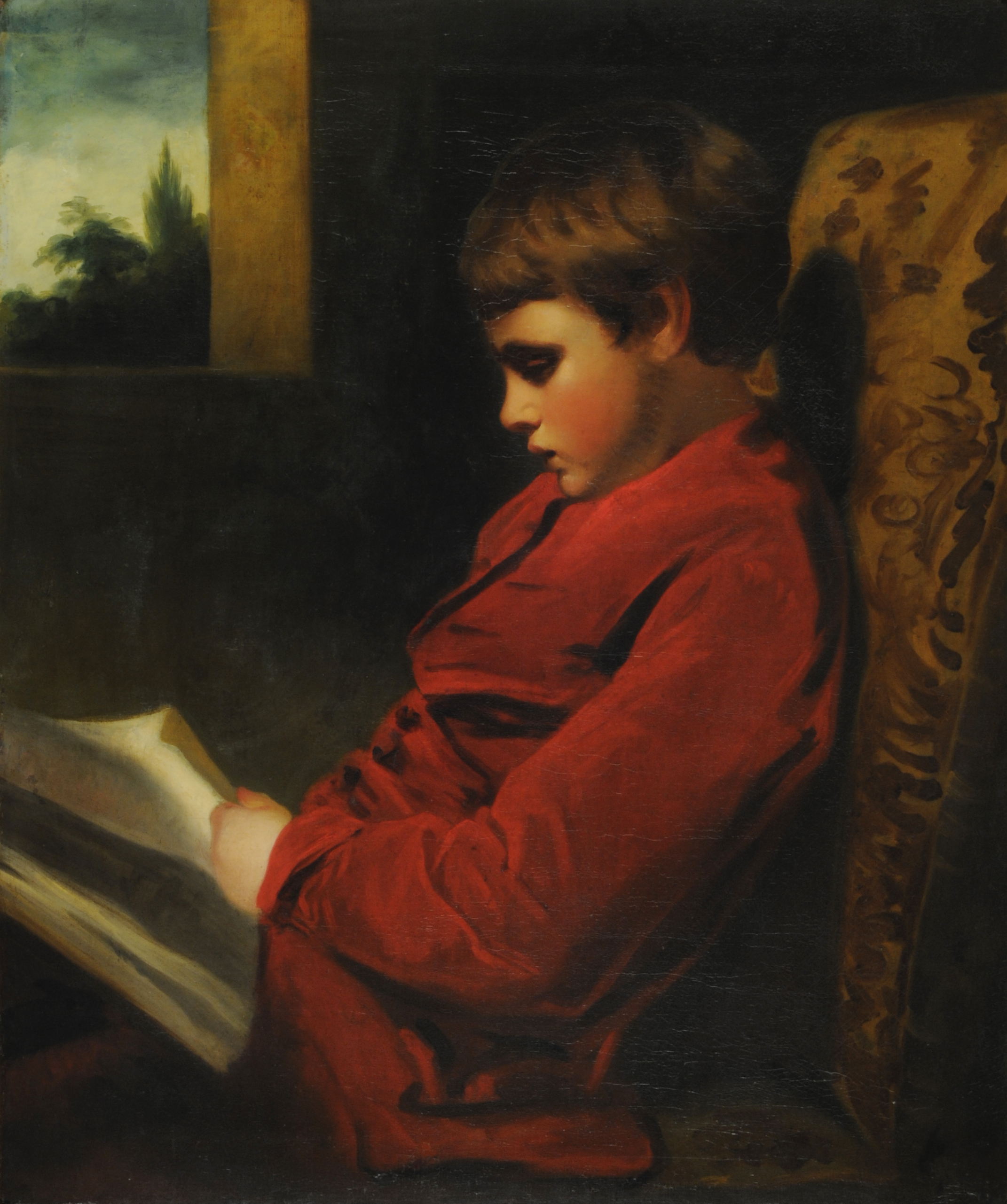
The Reading Boy by Joshua Reynolds

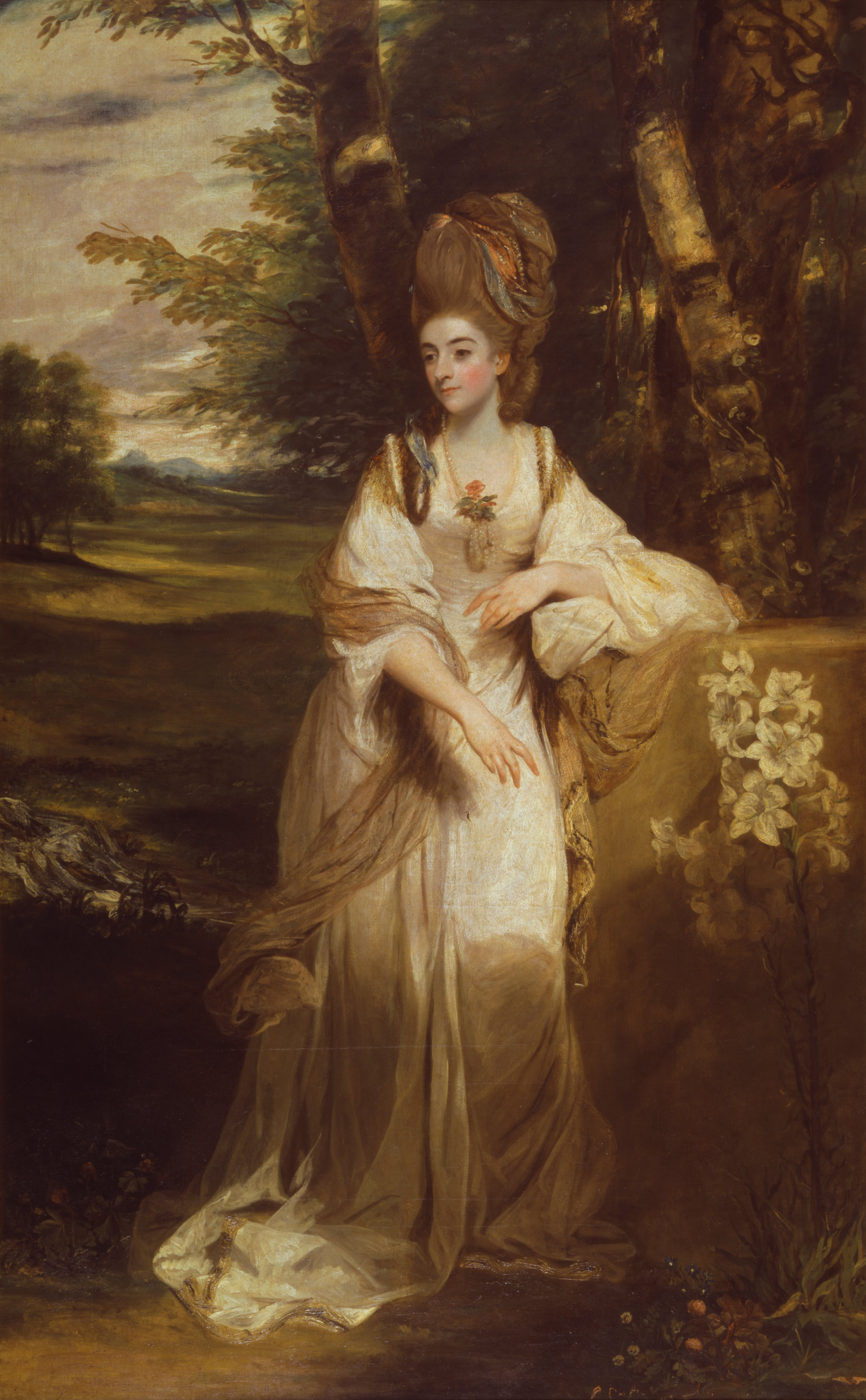
Portrait of Lady Bampfylde by Joshua Reynolds

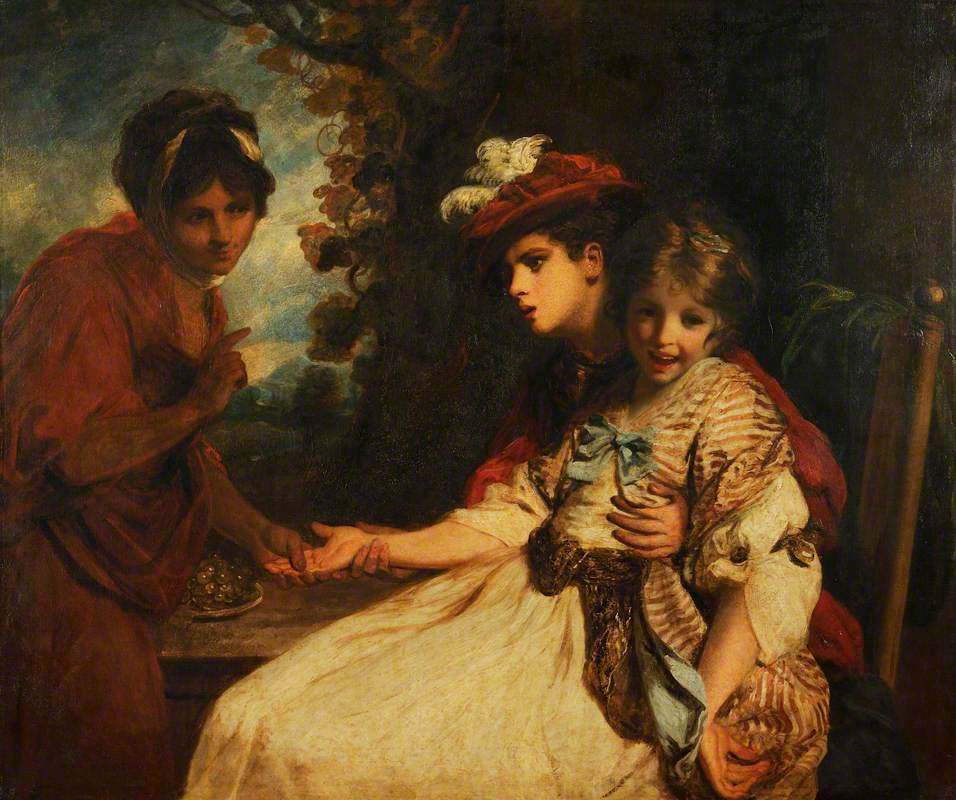
A Fortune-Teller by Joshua Reynolds

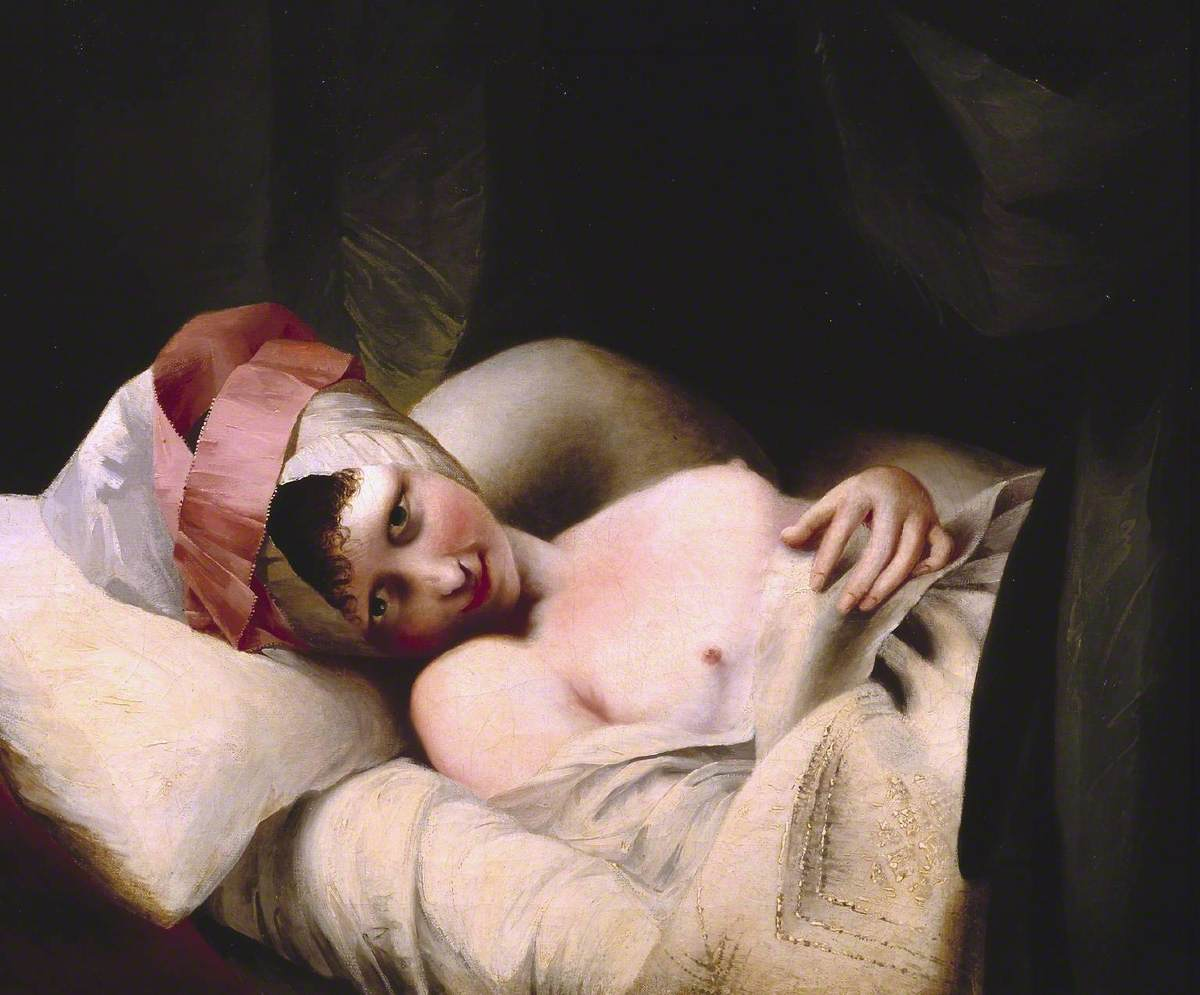
Lydia by William Peters

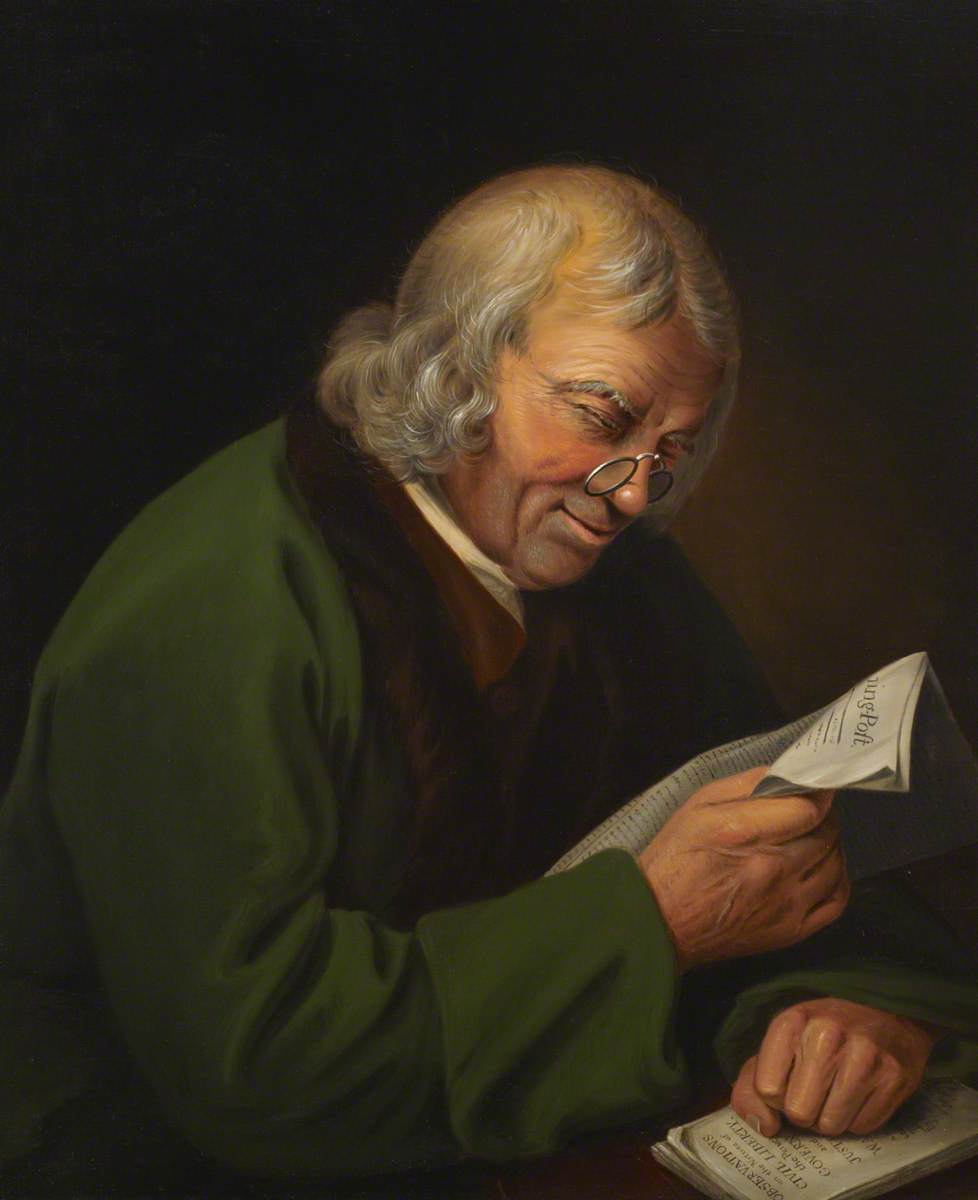
The Politician by Stephen Elmer

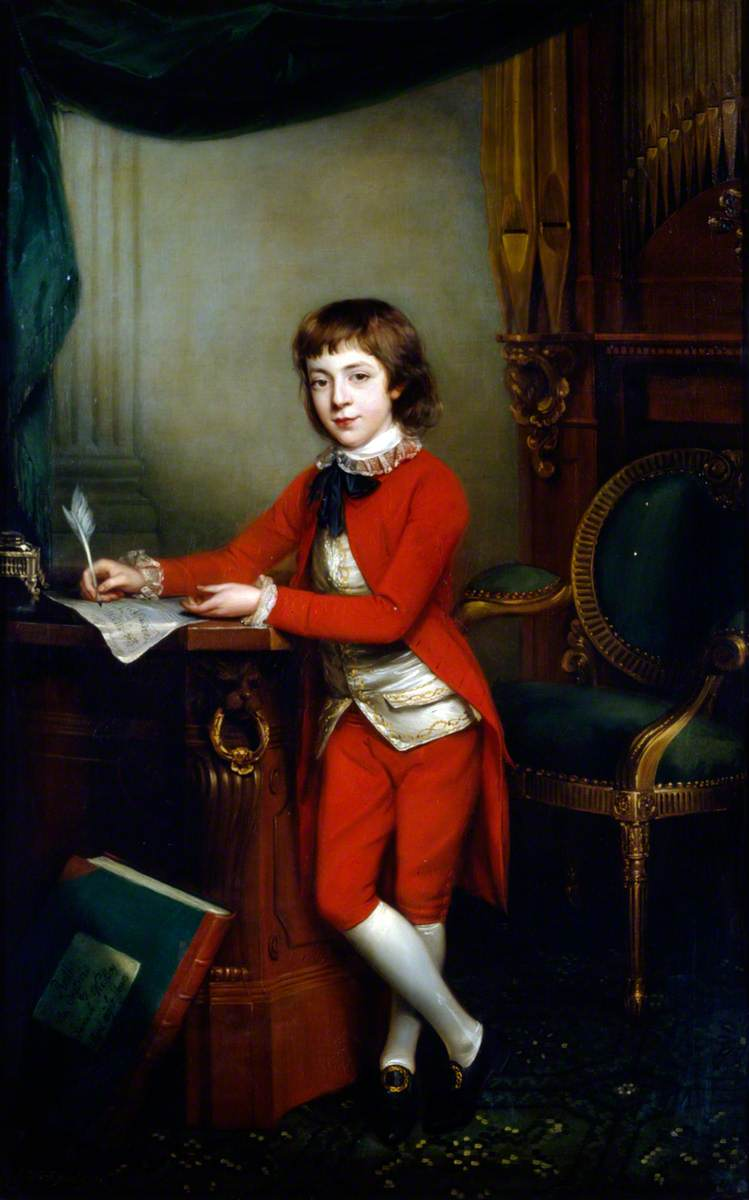
Portrait of Samuel Wesley by John Russell

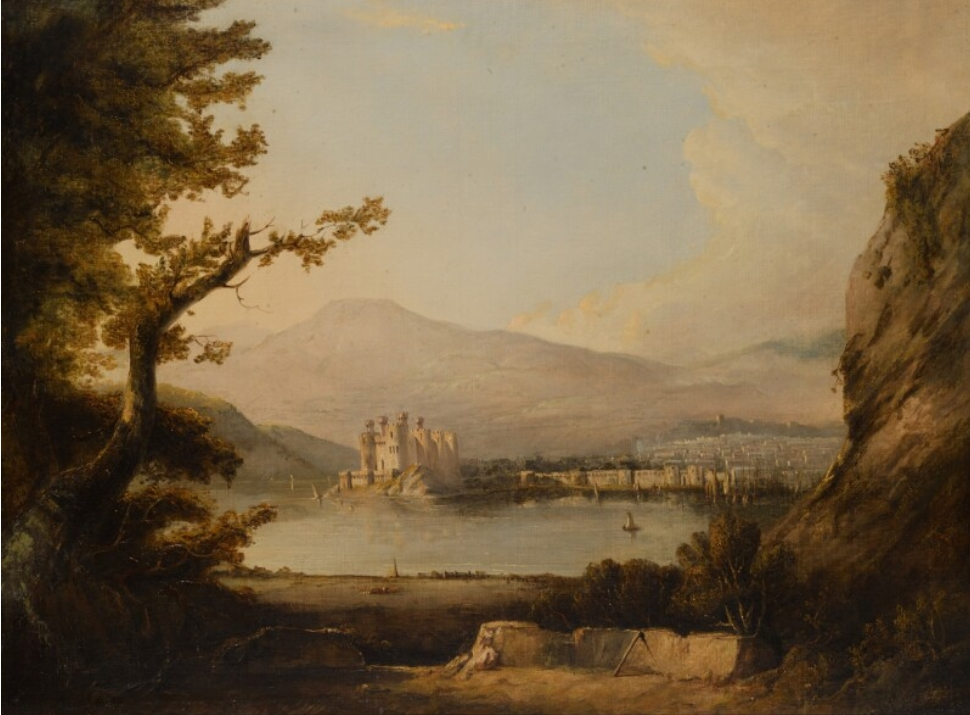
A View of Conway Castle by Edmund Garvey

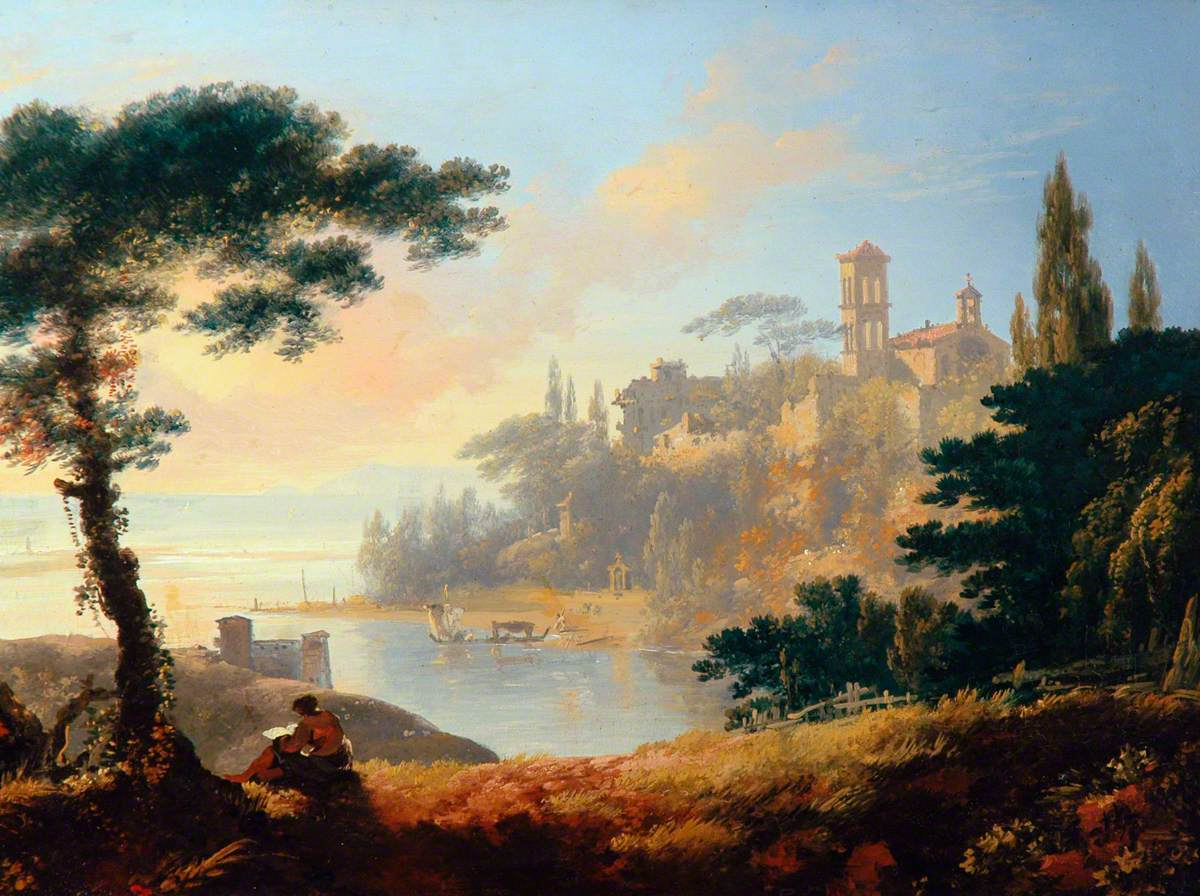
A View of the Island of Madeira by William Hodges

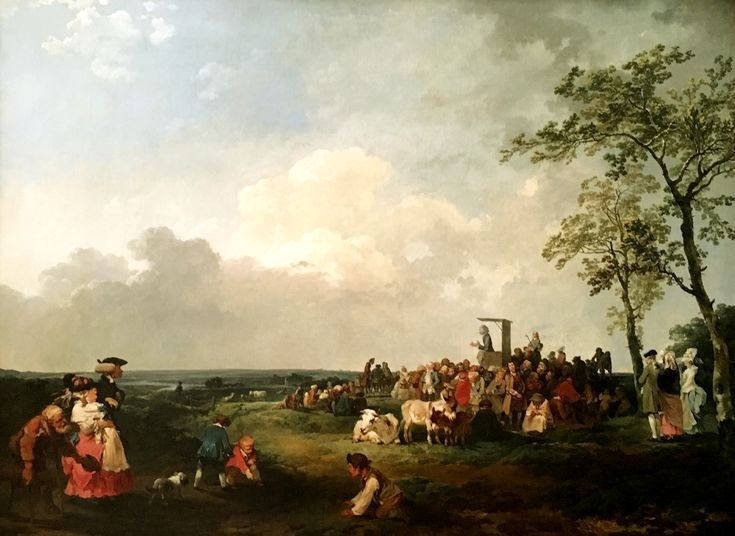
A Midsummer's Afternoon with a Methodist Preacher by Philip James de Loutherbourg

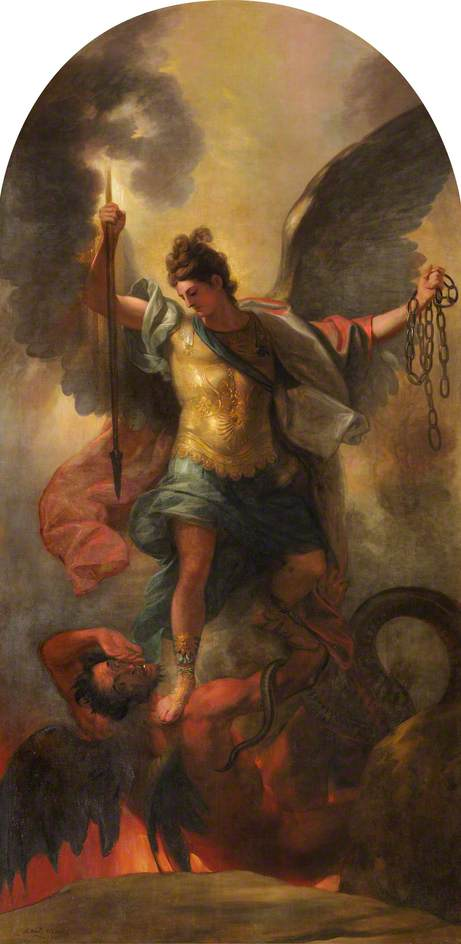
The Archangel Michael by Benjamin West

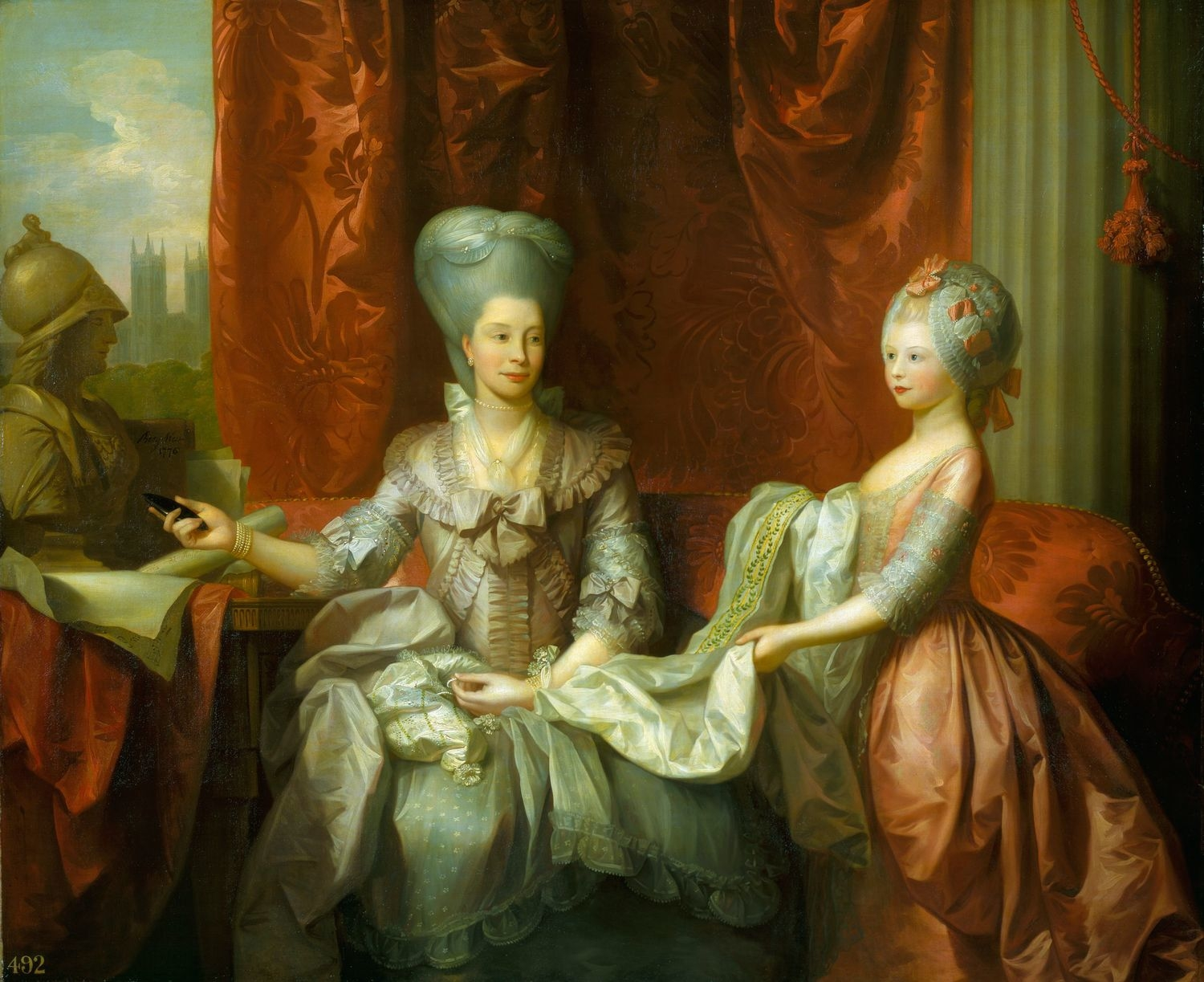
Queen Charlotte with the Princess Royal by Benjamin West

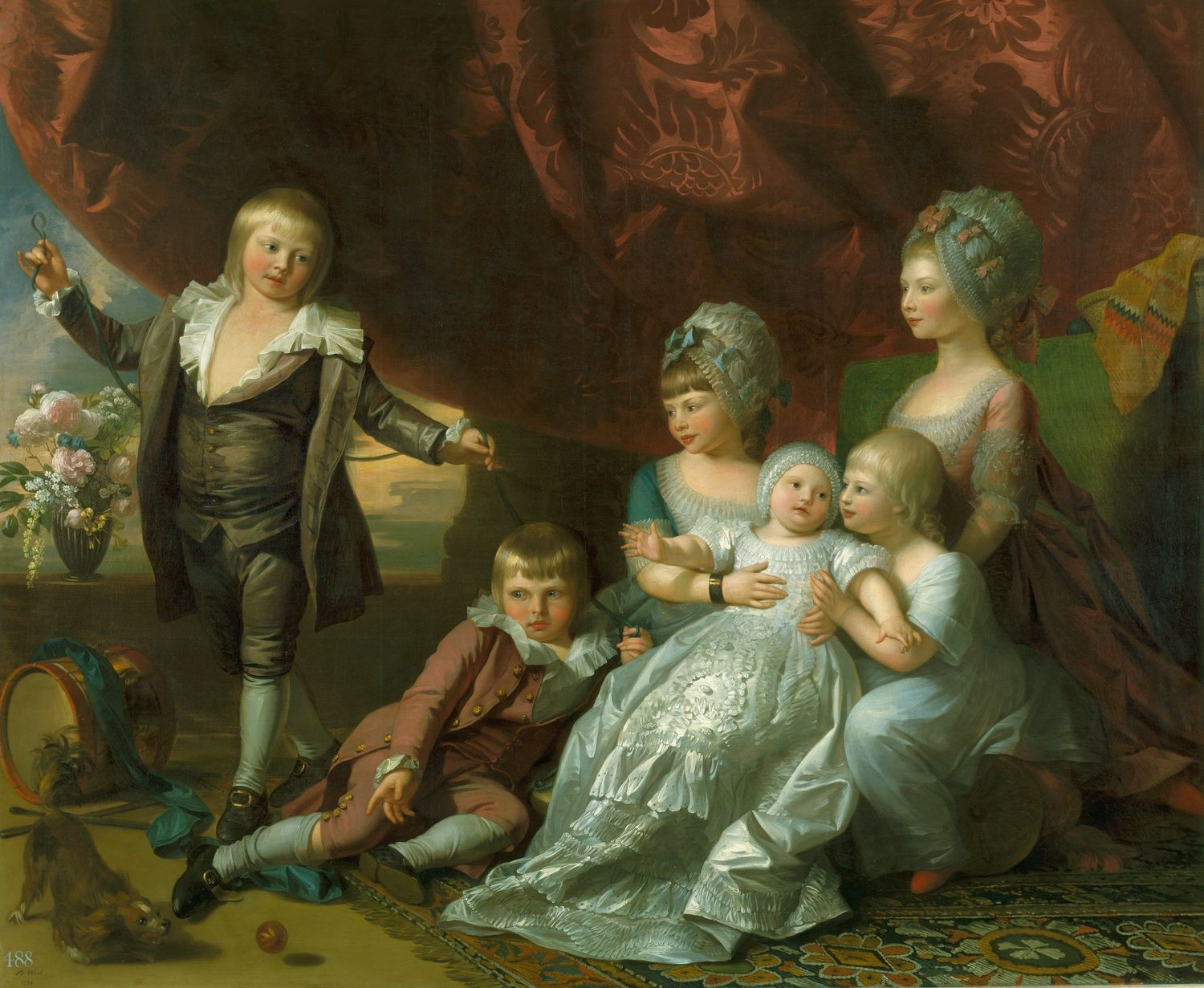
Six Children of George III by Benjamin West

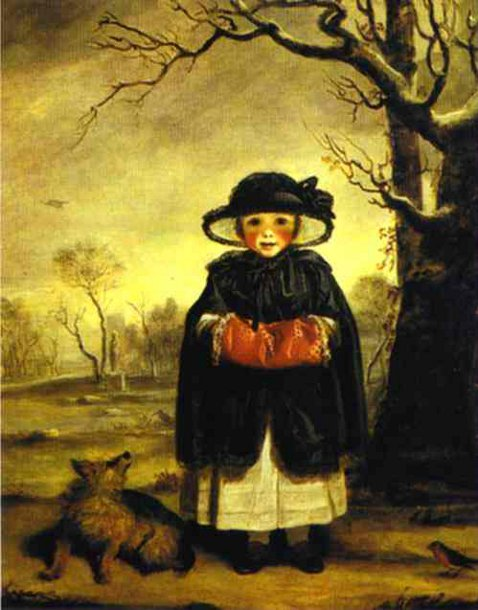
Lady Caroline Scott as Winter by Joshua Reynolds

== See also ==
- Salon of 1777, held at the Louvre in Paris

== Bibliography ==
- Hamilton, James. Gainsborough: A Portrait. Hachette UK, 2017.
- Hand, John Oliver. National Gallery of Art: Master Paintings from the Collection. National Gallery of Art, 2004.
- Kamensky, Jane. A Revolution in Color: The World of John Singleton Copley. W. W. Norton & Company, 2016.
- McIntyre, Ian. Joshua Reynolds: The Life and Times of the First President of the Royal Academy. Allen Lane, 2003.
- Moyle, Franny. Mrs Kauffman and Madame Le Brun: The Entwined Lives of Two Great Eighteenth-Century Women Artists. Bloomsbury Publishing, 2025.
