= The Watering Place (painting) =

Painting by Thomas Gainsborough

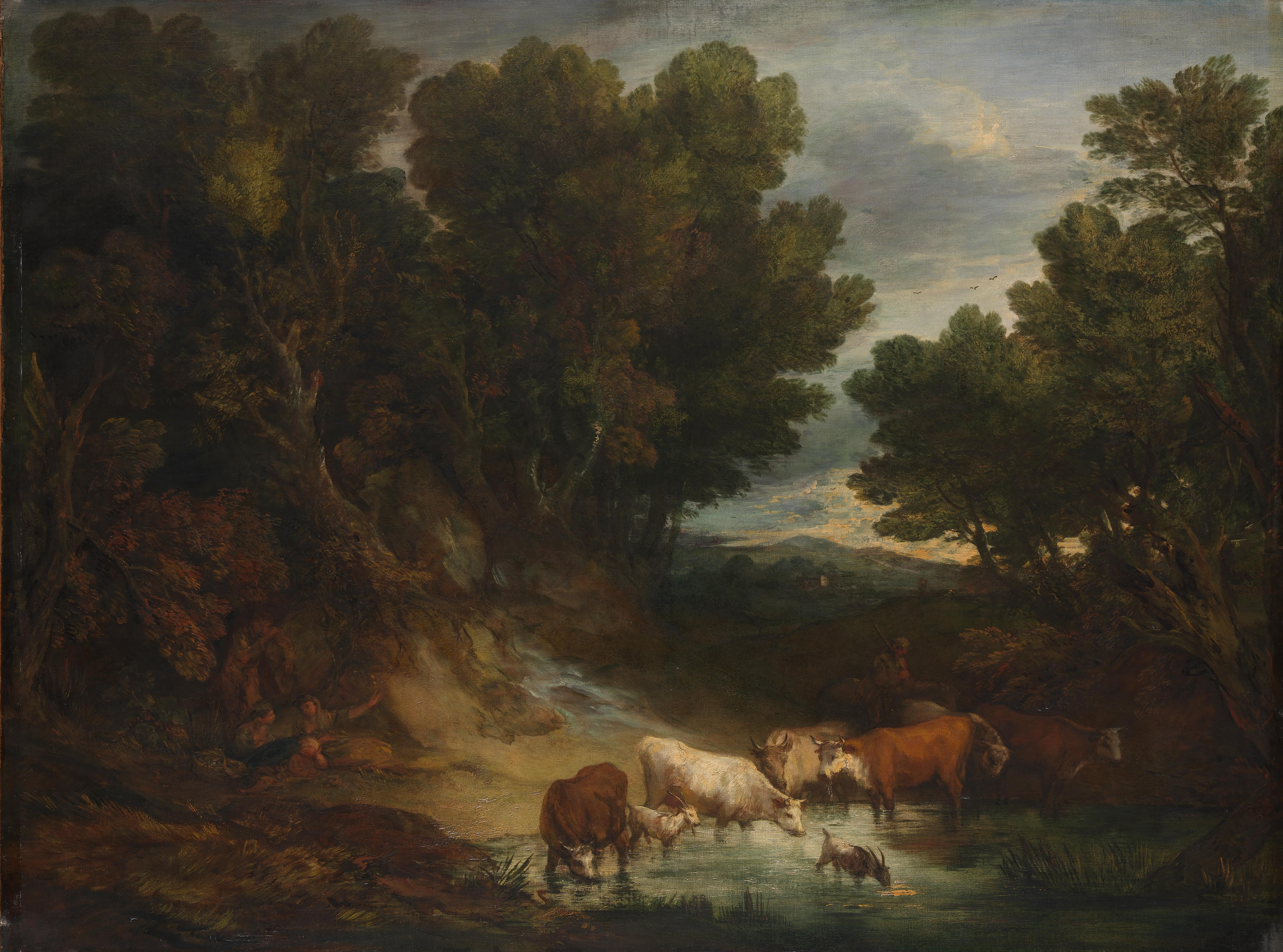
- Artist: Thomas Gainsborough
- Year: c. 1777
- Type: Oil on canvas, landscape painting
- Dimensions: 147.3 cm × 180.3 cm (58.0 in × 71.0 in)
- Location: National Gallery, London

The Watering Place is an oil on canvas landscape painting by the British artist Thomas Gainsborough, from c. 1777. It is held in the National Gallery, in London.

It was shown at the Royal Academy's Summer Exhibition of 1777. It was one seven paintings Gainsborough exhibited at the show, in a comeback after several years boycotting the Academy due to their rejection of his portrait of Countess of Waldergrave at the Exhibition of 1773. It was widely acclaimed. Horace Walpole described it as being "in the style of Rubens and by far the finest landscape ever painted in England and equal to the Great Masters".

It was donated to the National Gallery by Charles Long, 1st Baron Farnborough, in 1827.

== Bibliography ==
- Asfour, Amal & Williamson, Paul. Gainsborough's Vision. Liverpool University Press, 1999.
- Bermingham, Ann. Landscape and Ideology: The English Rustic Tradition, 1740-1860. University of California Press, 1989.
- Hamilton, James. Gainsborough: A Portrait. Hachette UK, 2017.
