= William Peters (painter) =

English painter

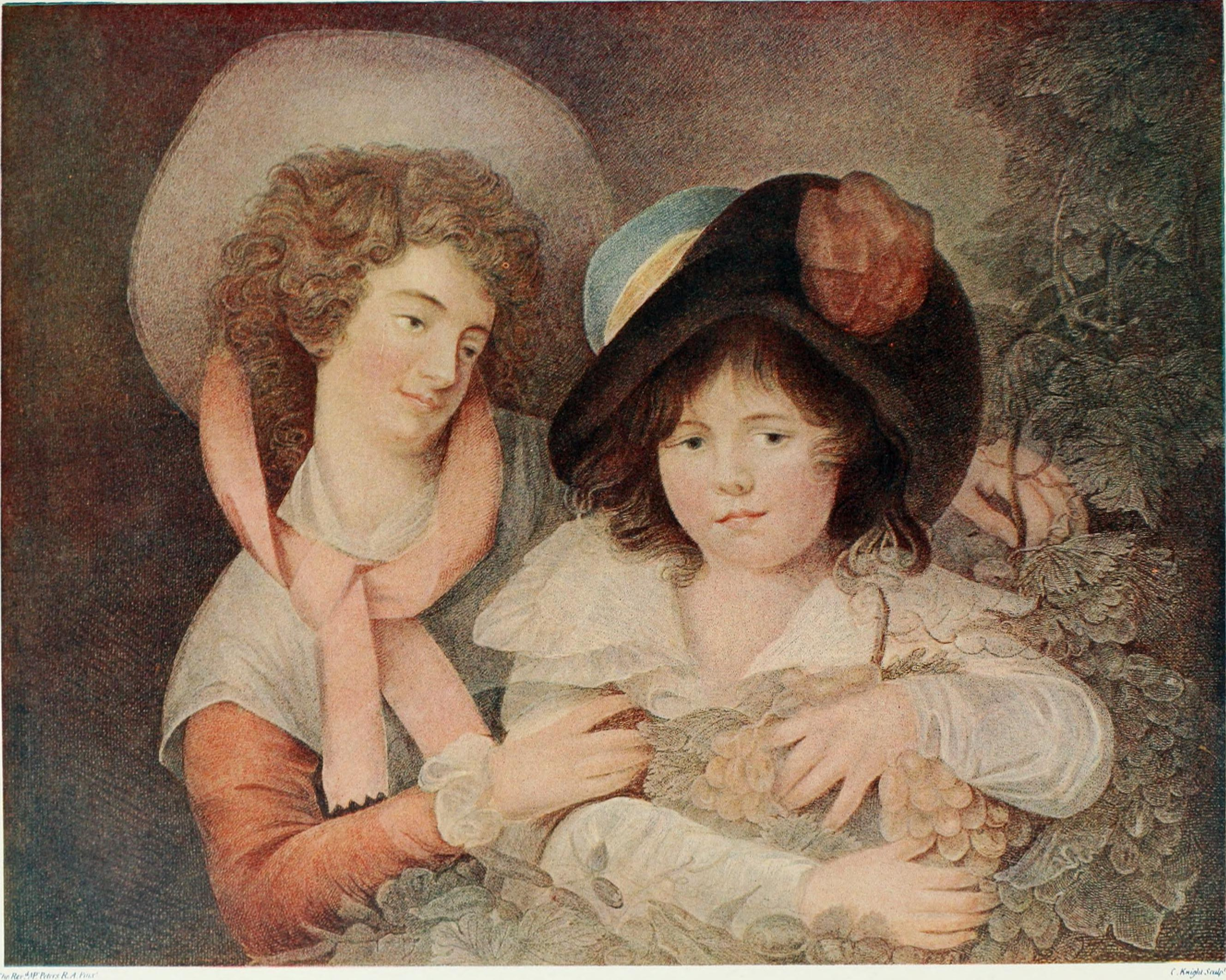
Lady Victoria Manners

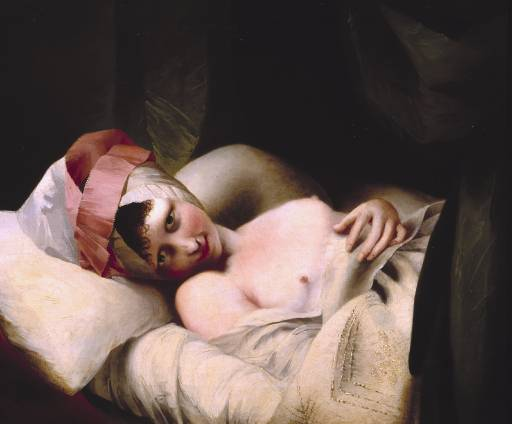
Peters later regretted painting erotic works, such as Lydia (c. 1777), after he became an ordained minister.

Matthew William Peters (1742 – 20 March 1814) was an English portrait and genre painter who later became an Anglican clergyman and chaplain to George IV. He became known as "William" when he started signing his works as "W. Peters".

== Life ==
Peters was born in Freshwater, Isle of Wight, the son of Matthew Peters (born at Belfast, 1711), a civil engineer and member of the Royal Dublin Society; by Elizabeth, the eldest daughter of George Younge of Dublin. The family moved from England to Dublin when Peters was young, where his father "advised on the improvement of loughs and rivers for navigation". and published two treatises on the subject.

Peters received his artistic training from Robert West in Dublin; in 1756 and 1758 he received prizes from the first School of Design in Dublin. In 1759, he was sent by the Dublin Society to London to become a student of Thomas Hudson and won a premium from the Society of Arts. The group also paid for him to travel to Italy to study art from 1761 to 1765. On 23 September 1762 he was elected to the Accademia del Disegno in Florence. Peters returned to England in 1765 and exhibited works at the Society of Artists from 1766 to 1769. Beginning in 1769, Peters exhibited works at the Royal Academy. In 1771 he was elected an associate and in 1777 an academician. He returned to Italy in 1771 and stayed until 1775. He also probably traveled to Paris in 1783–84, where he met Léopold Boilly, Antoine Vestier, and was influenced by the work of Jean-Baptiste Greuze.

On 27 February 1769, Peters became a freemason, and he was made the grand portrait painter of the Freemasons and the first provincial grand master of Lincolnshire in 1792. In 1785, he exhibited portraits of the Duke of Manchester and Lord Petre as Grand Master at the Royal Academy exhibition.

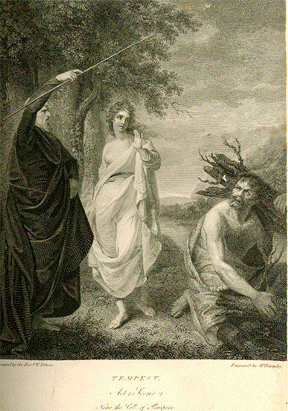
Near the Cell of Prospero by Peters

According to Robin Simon's article in the Oxford Dictionary of National Biography, "no British contemporary had such an Italian manner of painting as Peters, reflecting the old masters he copied". Many of Peters' works were erotic and although these works did not damage his career, according to Simon, Peters later regretted these when he became an ordained clergyman in 1781. He served as the Royal Academy's chaplain from 1784 to 1788, at which time he resigned to become chaplain to the Prince of Wales.

In 1784, Peters was awarded the living of Scalford, Leicestershire by Charles Manners, 4th Duke of Rutland. In 1788, the Dowager Duchess gave him the living at Knipton, at which time he also obtained that at Woolsthorpe. These livings were near to Belvoir Castle, at which he was curator of pictures. He became prebendary of Lincoln Cathedral in 1795, first with the stall of St Mary, Crackpool, but later with the better position of Langford Ecclesia, Oxfordshire. That same year he also acquired the living at Eaton. He lived at Woolsthorpe, Knipton, and Langford. After 1800, Masonic disputes forced Peters to live almost exclusively at Langford.

During these years, Peters also painted religious works, including a ten-by-five foot Annunciation for Lincoln Cathedral and The Resurrection of a Pious Family. He also painted five Shakespearean works for the Boydell Shakespeare Gallery and six for the Irish Shakespeare Gallery. He charged 80 guineas for painting full-length portraits.

On 28 April 1790 he and Margaret Susannah Knowsley were married; the couple had five children.

Peters died in Kent on 20 March 1814.
