= Nicholas Thomas Dall =

Scandinavian landscape painter

Nicholas Thomas Dall ARA (fl. – 1776 or 1777) was a native of Scandinavia (probably Denmark) who settled in London as a landscape painter in about 1760. He painted scenes for the Covent Garden Theatre, though his engagements in that branch of art prevented him from painting many pictures. In 1768 he obtained the first premium given by the Society for the Encouragement of Arts for the best landscape. He was chosen an Associate of the Royal Academy in 1771, and died in London.
