= Jean-Eugène-Charles Alberti =

Dutch painter

Johannes Echarius Carolus or Jean Eugène Charles Alberti (bapt. 20 June 1777 - after 1843), was a Dutch painter of Italian descent who worked in Paris for most of his life.

== Life ==
Alberti was born in Maastricht. He studied first in Amsterdam, where he had moved at the age of five, and then at Paris under David, and afterwards in Rome, where he copied the works of Guido Reni and Anthony van Dyck. He subsequently returned and settled in Paris. He left Paris in 1843, presumably returning to the Netherlands, but the date of his death is not recorded. Marius among the Ruins of Carthage, painted in 1805, gained him a gold medal.

Alberti made engravings both from his own works and from those of the Italian masters.

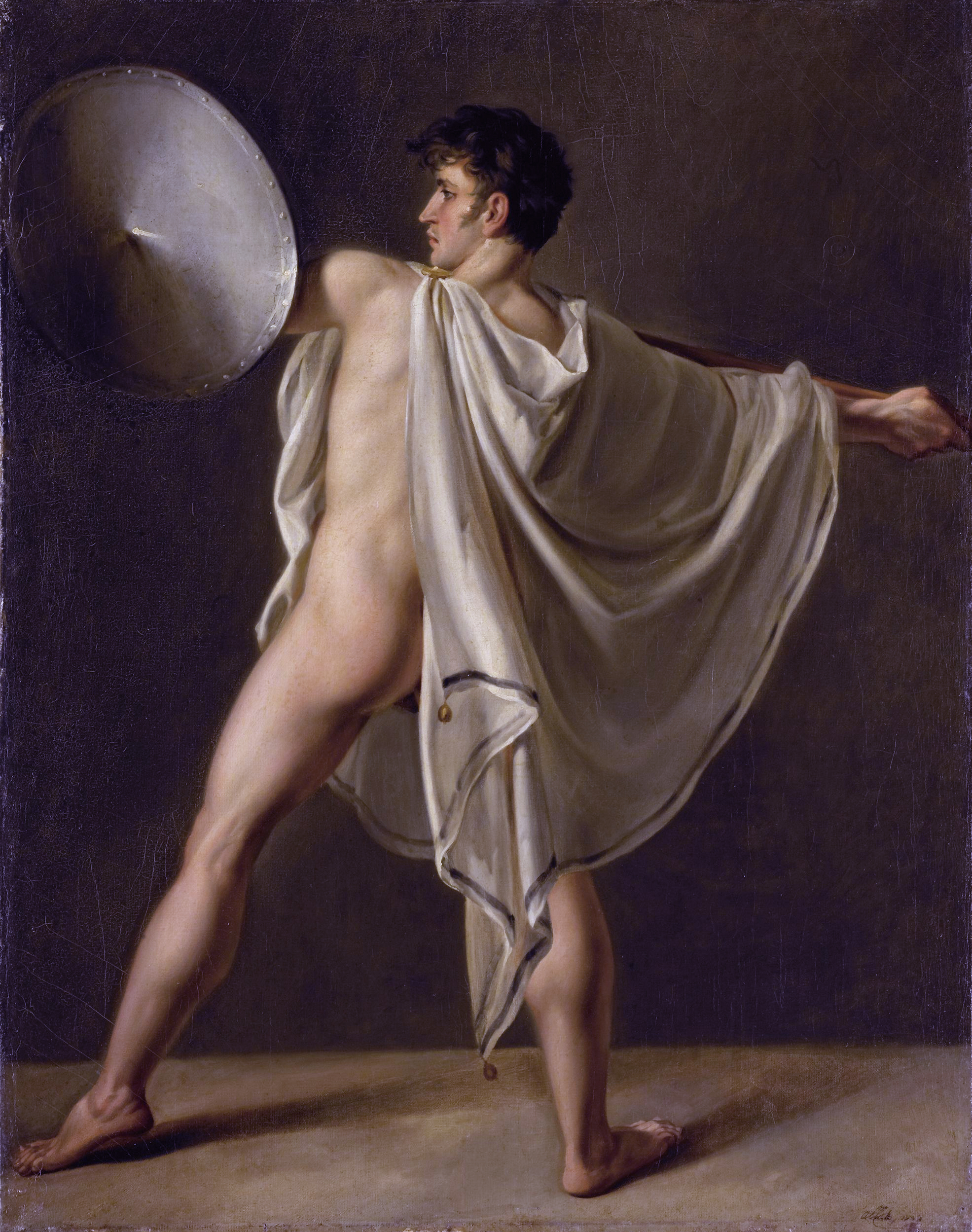
Warrior with shield and lance (1808)

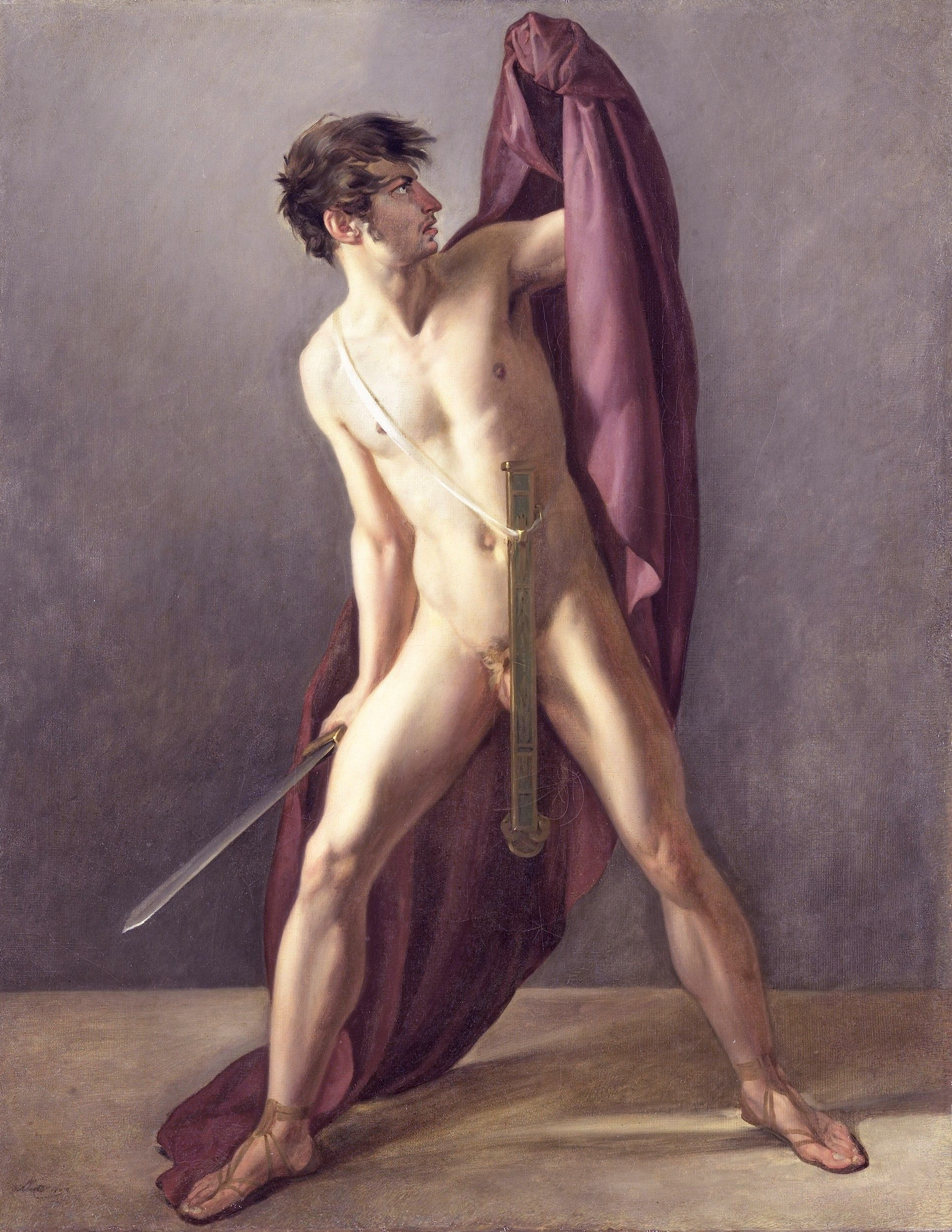
Warrior with drawn sword (1808)

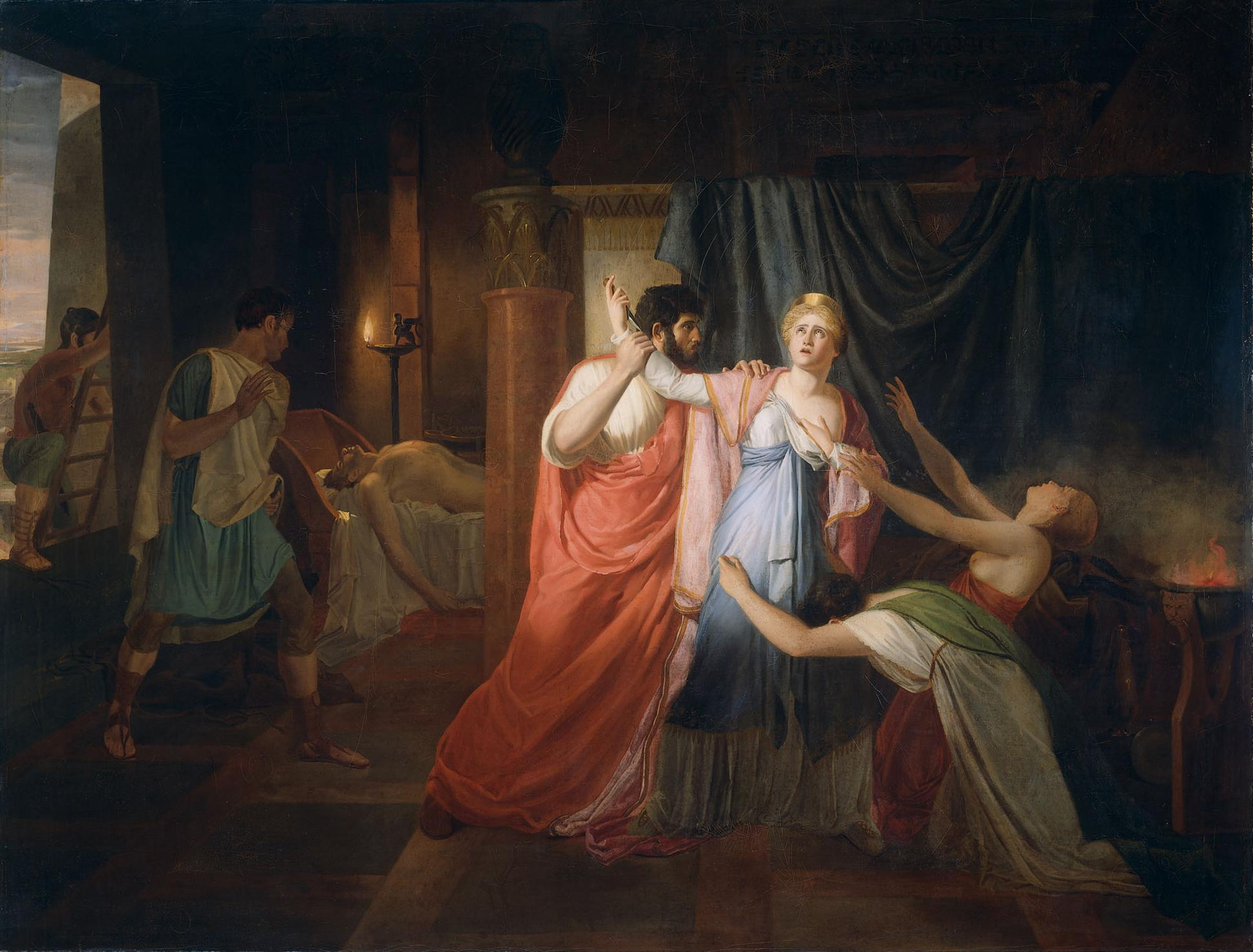
Proculeius preventing Cleopatra from stabbing herself (1810)
