= The Copley Family =

Painting by John Singleton Copley

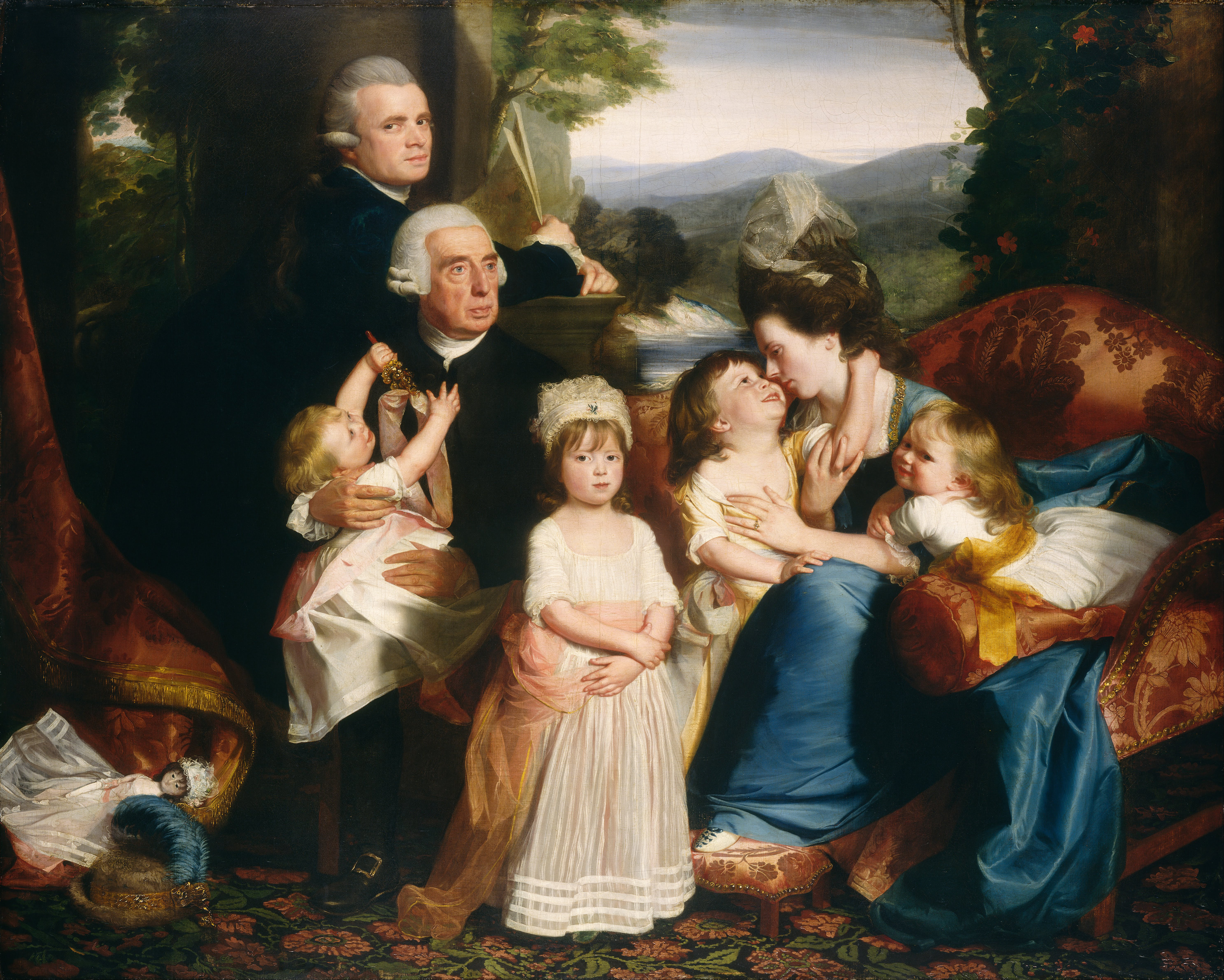
- Artist: John Singleton Copley
- Year: 1777
- Type: Oil on canvas, portrait painting
- Dimensions: 184.1 cm × 229.2 cm (72.5 in × 90.2 in)
- Location: National Gallery of Art, Washington D.C.
- Accession: 1961.7.1

The Copley Family is a 1777 oil on canvas portrait painting by the American artist John Singleton Copley. A group portrait, it features a self-portrait of the artist with his wife Susanna and children and his father-in-law Richard Clarke, an Loyalist merchant.

The Boston-born Copley settled in Britain shortly after the outbreak of the American War of Independence. He became known for his large modern history paintings such as The Death of Lord Chatham, The Death of Major Pierson and The Defeat of the Floating Batteries at Gibraltar.

The work was displayed at the Royal Academy's Summer Exhibition of 1777 at Pall Mall in London. Today the painting is in the National Gallery of Art in Washington, having once belonged to the artist's son Lord Lyndhurst, a British lawyer and politician and one of the sitters in the painting.

== Bibliography ==
- Hoock, Holger. Empires of the Imagination: Politics, War, and the Arts in the British World, 1750–1850. Profile Books, 2010.
- Kamensky, Jane. A Revolution in Color: The World of John Singleton Copley. W. W. Norton & Company, 2016.
- Prown, Jules David. John Singleton Copley: In England, 1774–1815. National Gallery of Art, Washington, 1966.
