= Gustaf Erik Hedman =

Finnish painter

Gustaf Erik Hedman (1777 – 1841) was a Finnish painter.

Hedman was born in Oulu, and married to Elisabeth Margaretha. He studied at the Royal Swedish Academy of Arts. He primarily painted religious-themed works for church commissions. His works include murals and altarpieces at the Esse (1816) and Vähäkyrö (1819) churches. He has also painted furniture.
