= A Fortune-Teller =

Painting by Joshua Reynolds

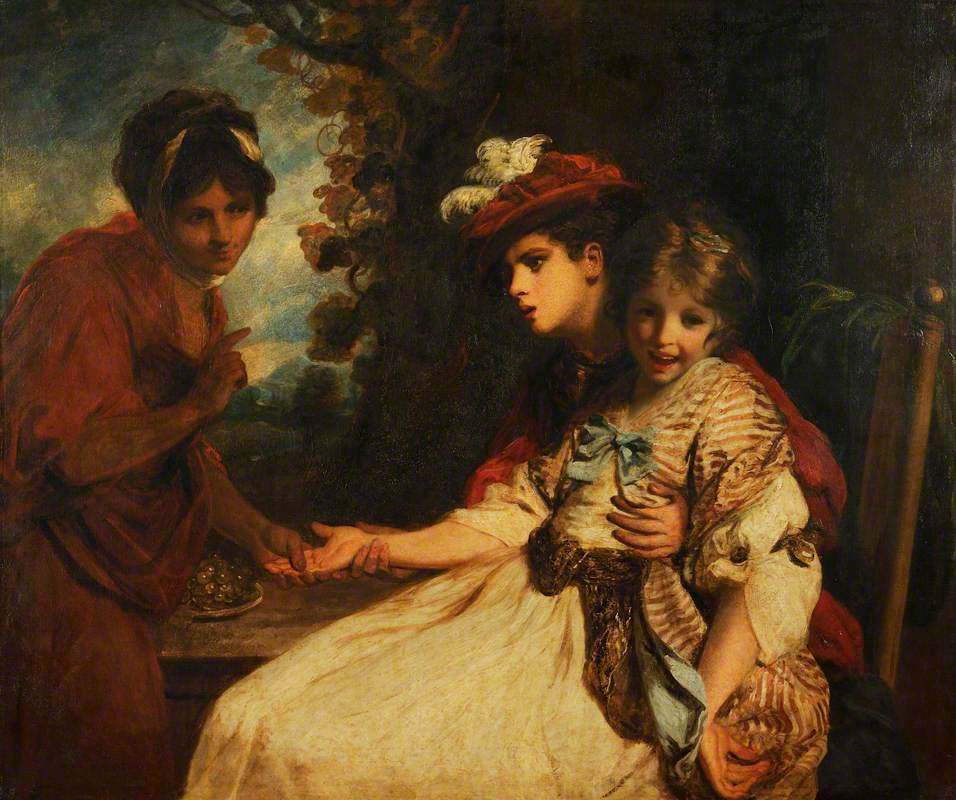
- Artist: Joshua Reynolds
- Year: 1777
- Type: Oil on canvas, genre painting
- Dimensions: 124.5 cm × 147.5 cm (49.0 in × 58.1 in)
- Location: Waddesdon Manor, Buckinghamshire

A Fortune-Teller is a 1777 genre painting by the British artist Joshua Reynolds. It presents a gipsy fortune teller reading the palm of a woman with a young girl perched on her lap. Reynolds, the first President of the Royal Academy was well-known for his portraits but increasingly branched out into other genres including history. With this painting he may have been making reference to a work of Caravaggio It was displayed at the Royal Academy Exhibition of 1777 at Pall Mall. Today the original is at Waddesdon Manor in Buckinghamshire. Other versions of the work exist, notably a 1781 painting now in the collection of Kenwood House in Highgate.

== Bibliography ==
- Bryant, Juliua. Kenwood: Catalogue of Paintings in the Iveagh Bequest. Yale University Pewss, 2003.
- McIntyre, Ian. Joshua Reynolds: The Life and Times of the First President of the Royal Academy. Allen Lane, 2003.
