= Portrait of Lady Bampfylde =

Painting by Joshua Reynolds

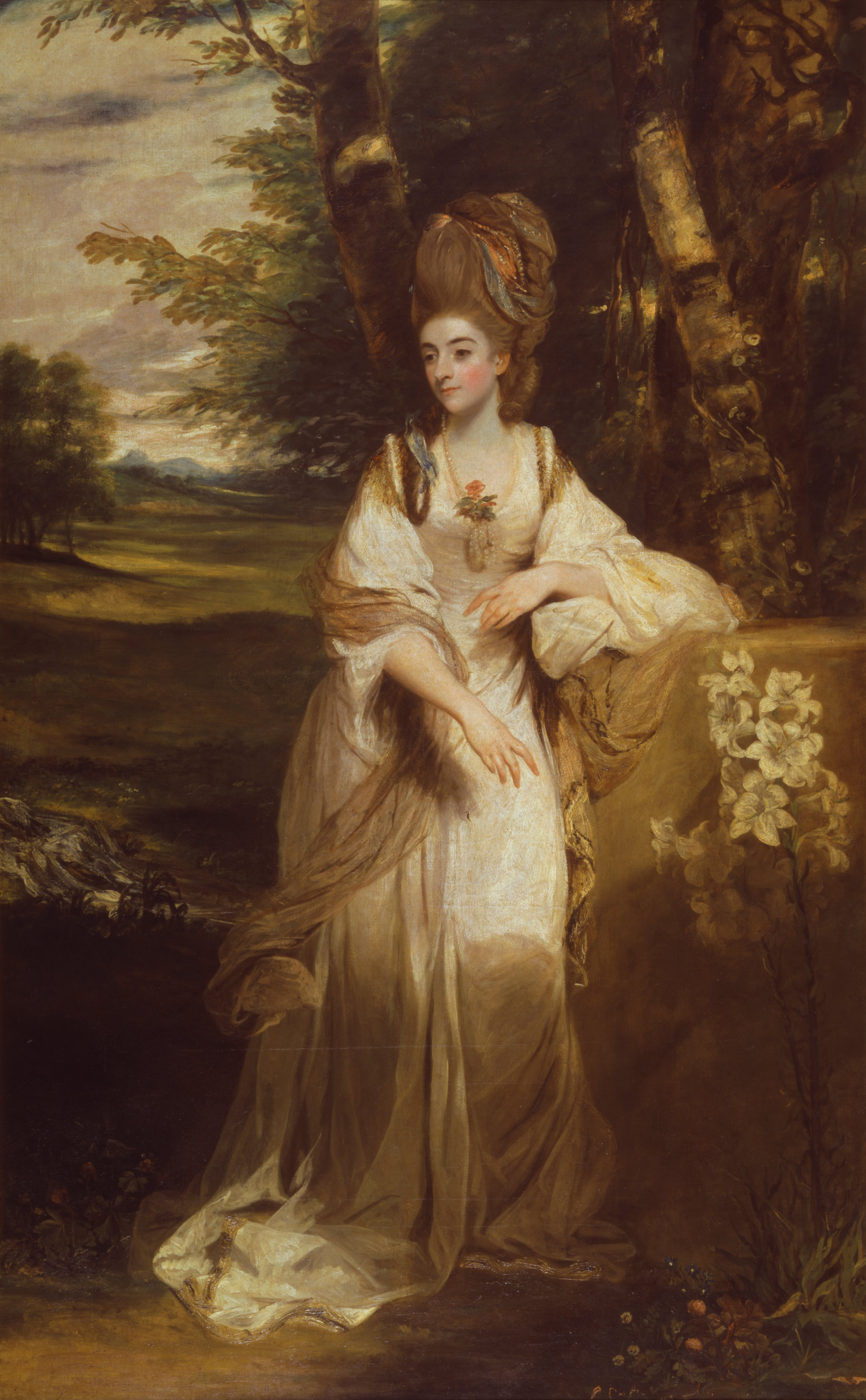
- Artist: Joshua Reynolds
- Year: 1777
- Type: Oil on canvas, portrait painting
- Dimensions: 238.1 cm × 148 cm (93.7 in × 58 in)
- Location: Tate Britain, London

Portrait of Lady Bampfylde is a c.1777 portrait painting by the British artist Joshua Reynolds depicting Catherine, Lady Bampfylde. She was the wife of Sir Charles Bampfylde, a Devon landowner and Member of Parliament. The couple married in February 1776 in Piccadilly. The full-length portrait was likely produced to commemorate the wedding.

Reynolds was the President of the Royal Academy and the leading portraitist of the late eighteenth century. The painting was displayed at the Royal Academy's Summer Exhibition of 1777 at Pall Mall in London. Today the painting is in the collection of the Tate Britain in Pimlico, having been bequeathed by the art collector Alfred de Rothschild in 1918.

== Bibliography ==
- McIntyre, Ian. Joshua Reynolds: The Life and Times of the First President of the Royal Academy. Allen Lane, 2003.
- Postle, Edward (ed.) Joshua Reynolds: The Creation of Celebrity. Harry N. Abrams, 2005.
