= Angelica Kauffman =

Swiss artist (1741–1807)

- Portrait of Angelica Kauffman by Nathaniel Dance-Holland, 1764
- Born: Maria Anna Angelika Kauffmann; 30 October 1741; Chur
- Died: 5 November 1807 (aged 66); Rome
- Known for: Painting
- Movement: Neoclassicism
- Spouses: Frederick de Horn (m. 1767; sep. 1768) Antonio Zucchi (m. 1781; died 1795)
- Father: Joseph Johann Kauffmann

Maria Anna Angelika Kauffmann RA (/ˈkaʊfmən/ KOWF-mən; 30 October 1741 – 5 November 1807), usually known in English as Angelica Kauffman, (Note: Kauffman is the preferred spelling of her name in English; it is the form she herself used most in signing her correspondence, documents and paintings.) was a Swiss painter who had a successful career in London and Rome. Remembered primarily as a history painter, Kauffman was a skilled portraitist, landscape and decoration painter. She was, along with Mary Moser, one of two female painters among the founding members of the Royal Academy of Art in London in 1768.

== Early life ==
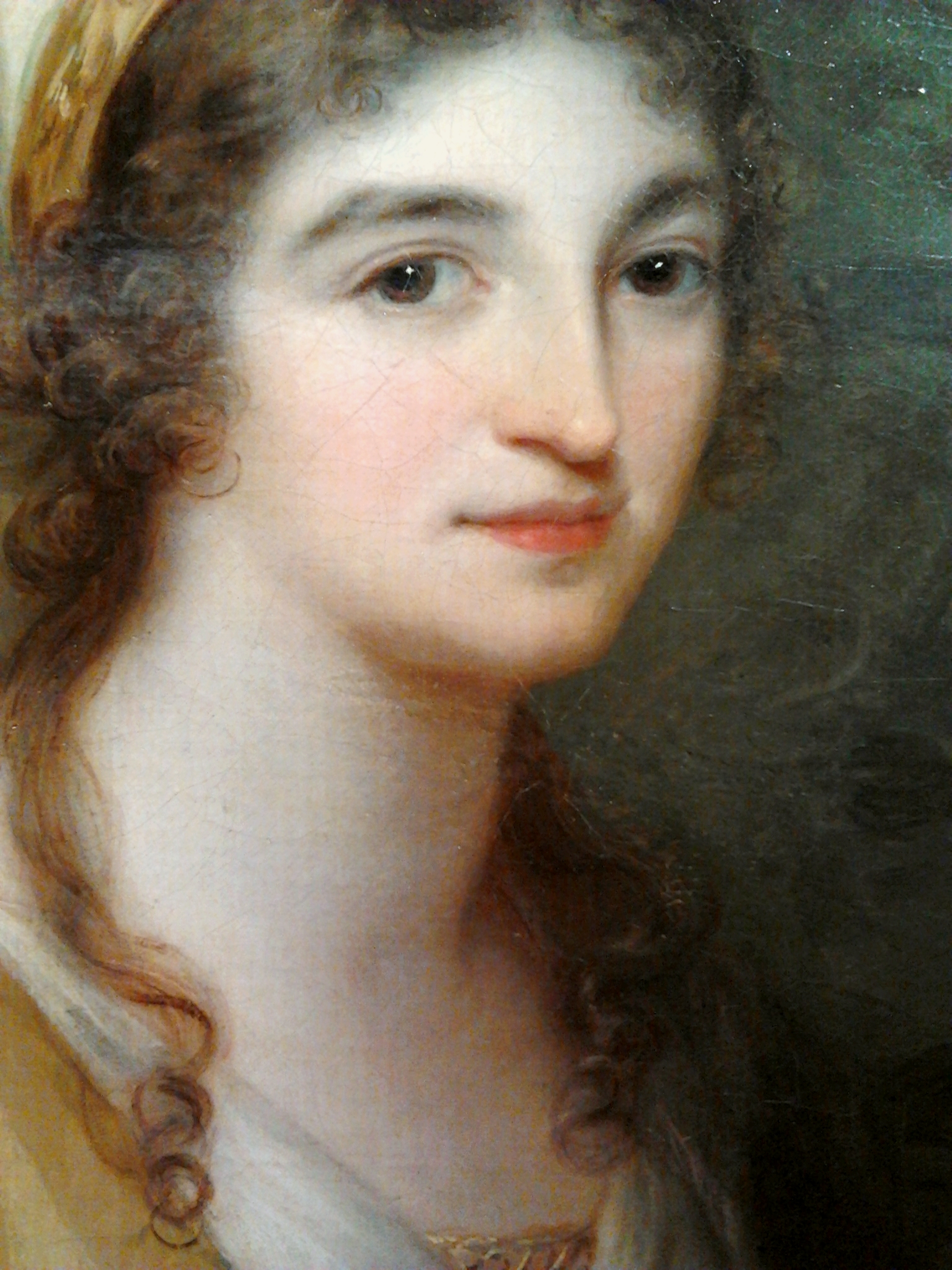
Detail of Tragedy and Comedy, painted in Rome in 1791 (National Museum in Warsaw). Harmonious and powerful colours and the soft-brushed, multi-layered style of English portraitists, Sir Joshua Reynolds and Thomas Gainsborough, are typical for Kauffman's paintings.

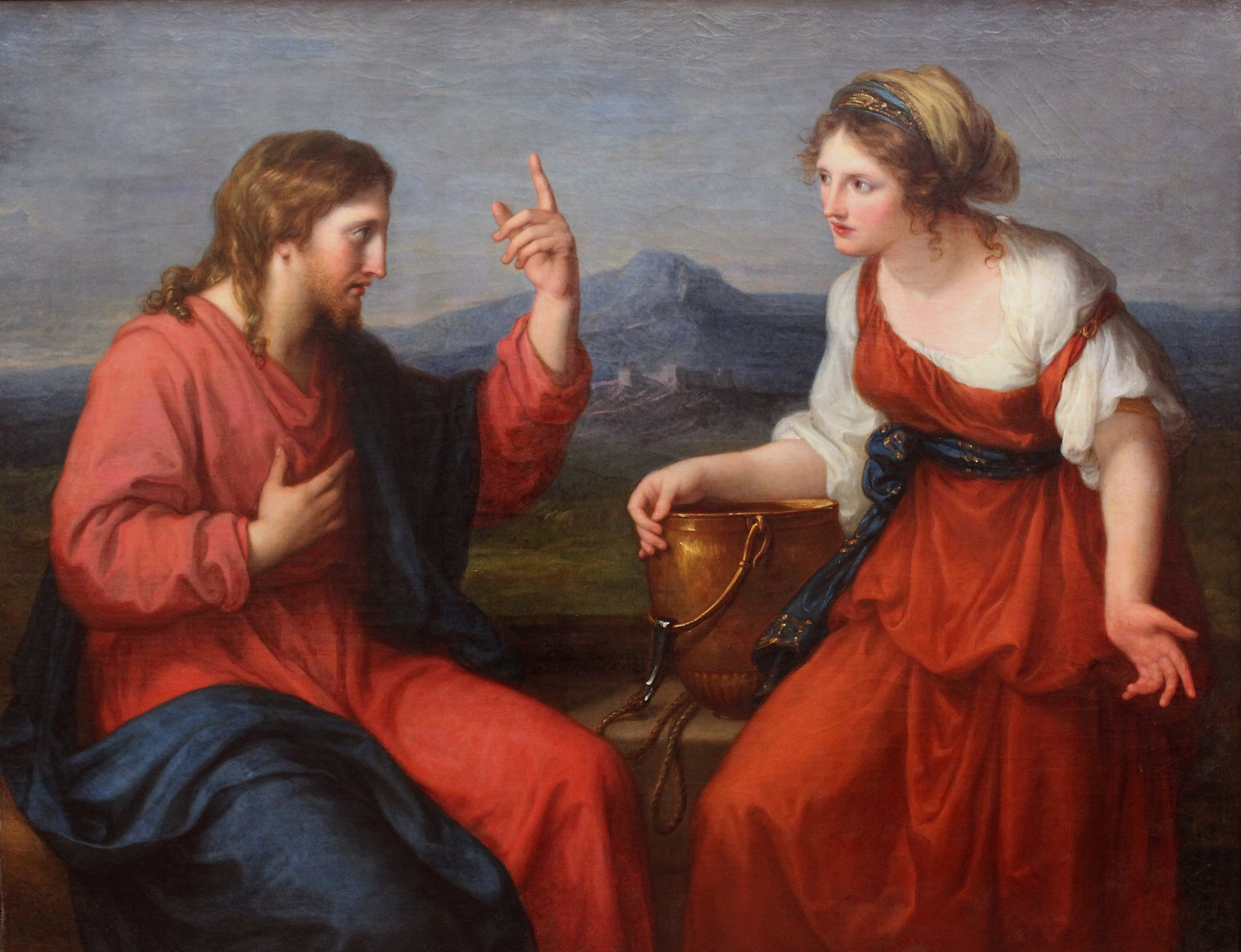
Christ and the Samaritan Woman at the Well (1795), oil on canvas, 123.5 x 158.5 cm., Neue Pinakothek, Munich

Kauffman was born at Chur in Graubünden, Switzerland. Her family moved to Morbegno in 1742, then to Como in Lombardy in 1752 at that time under Austrian rule. In 1757, she accompanied her father to Schwarzenberg in Vorarlberg/Austria, where her father was working for the local bishop. Her father, Joseph Johann Kauffmann, was a relatively poor man but a skilled Austrian muralist and painter, who was often travelling for his work. He trained Angelica and she worked as his assistant, moving through Switzerland, Austria, and Italy. Angelica, a child prodigy, rapidly acquired four languages from her mother, Cleophea Lutz: German, Italian, French and English.

She also was a skilled singer and showed talent as a musician. Kauffman was forced to choose between opera and art. She quickly chose art, as a Catholic priest told her that the opera was a dangerous place filled with "seedy people". By her twelfth year, she had already become known as a painter, with bishops and nobles sitting for her.

In 1757, her mother died, and her father decided to move to Milan. Long visits to Italy followed. Kauffman and her family moved to Florence in June 1762, where the young artist first discovered the Neoclassical painting style. In October 1762, she became an elected member of the Accademia delle Arti del Disegno and an honorary member of the Accademia Clementina di Bologna. Moving to Rome in January 1763, Kauffman was introduced to the British community. While learning more English and continuing her portraiture, Kauffman moved again to Naples with her family a few months later. There, Kauffman studied works by the Old Masters and had her first painting sent to a public exhibition in London. Later, in 1763, she visited Rome, returning again in 1764. From Rome, she passed to Bologna and Venice, widely celebrated for her talents and charm. Writing from Rome in August 1764 to his friend Franke, Johann Joachim Winckelmann refers to her popularity. At the time, she was painting a half-length portrait of him, of which she also made an etching. According to Winckelmann, Kauffman spoke Italian as well as German and expressed herself with facility in French and English – becoming a popular portraitist for British visitors to Rome as a result of the latter accomplishment. "She may be styled beautiful," Winckelmann adds, "and in singing may vie with our best virtuosi." In May 1765, she was elected to the Accademia di San Luca, submitting Allegory of Hope as her reception piece. In the same month, her work appeared in England in an exhibition of the Free Society of Artists. She moved to England shortly afterwards, and established herself as a leading artist.

== Years in Great Britain ==
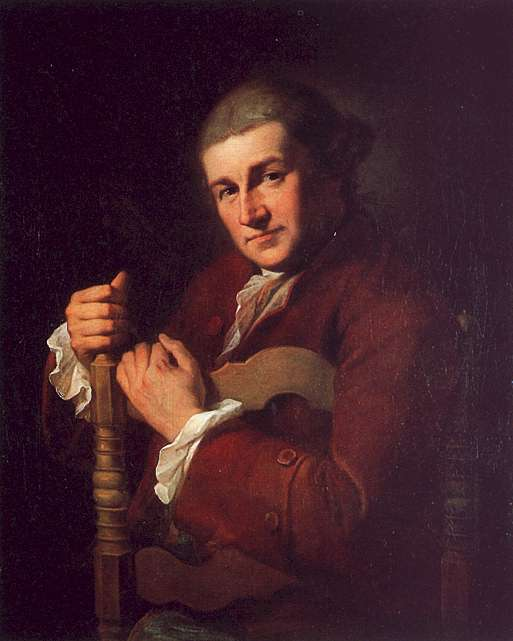
Portrait of David Garrick (1764), oil on canvas, 84 x 69 cm., Burghley House, Lincolnshire

While in Venice, Kauffman was persuaded by Lady Wentworth, the wife of the John Murray, the British resident minister, to accompany her to London. Soon she lodged with a local surgeon's family, including Anne Home. Her first work displayed in London was the portrait of David Garrick, exhibited the year before her arrival in June 1766. The rank of Lady Wentworth opened society to her, and she was well received, with the royal family especially showing her great favour.

In the spring of 1767, Kauffman established her own household at 16 Golden Square. Her father, Joseph Johann Kauffmann, joined her in London that year, accompanied by her cousin Rosa Florini, who later married Joseph Bonomi the Elder. Golden Square became both Kauffman's home and a centre of her professional and social life. Among the artists in her circle was Antonio Zucchi, who worked extensively with Robert Adam and later became Kauffman's husband. Zucchi's associates included Bonomi and the young painter William Hamilton. Zucchi also frequently brought his friend Jean-Paul Marat with him when visiting Kauffman at Golden Square. Kauffman's firmest friend, however, was Sir Joshua Reynolds. In his pocketbook, her name as "Miss Angelica" or "Miss Angel" appears frequently; in 1766 he painted her, a compliment which she returned with her Portrait of Sir Joshua Reynolds.

In 1767, Kauffman was seduced by an imposter going by the name Count Frederick de Horn, whom she married, but they separated the following year. It was probably owing to Reynolds's good offices that she was among the signatories to the petition to the King for the establishment of the Royal Academy. In its first catalogue of 1769, she appears with "R.A." after her name (an honour she shared with one other woman, Mary Moser); and she contributed the Interview of Hector and Andromache, and three other classical compositions. She spent several months in Ireland in 1771, as a guest of the Lord Lieutenant of Ireland, Viscount Townshend, and undertook a number of portrait commissions there. Her notable Irish portraits include those of Philip Tisdall, the Attorney General for Ireland, and his wife Mary, who acted as her patron, and of Henry Loftus, 1st Earl of Ely and his family, including his niece Dorothea Monroe, the most admired Irish beauty of her time. It appears that among her circle of friends was Jean-Paul Marat, then living in London and practising medicine, with whom she may have had an affair. (Note: Conner attributes the allegation to Jacques Pierre Brissot, who reported it as hearsay in his Mémoires, 1754–1793 (1912), but does not find the evidence for it compelling.)

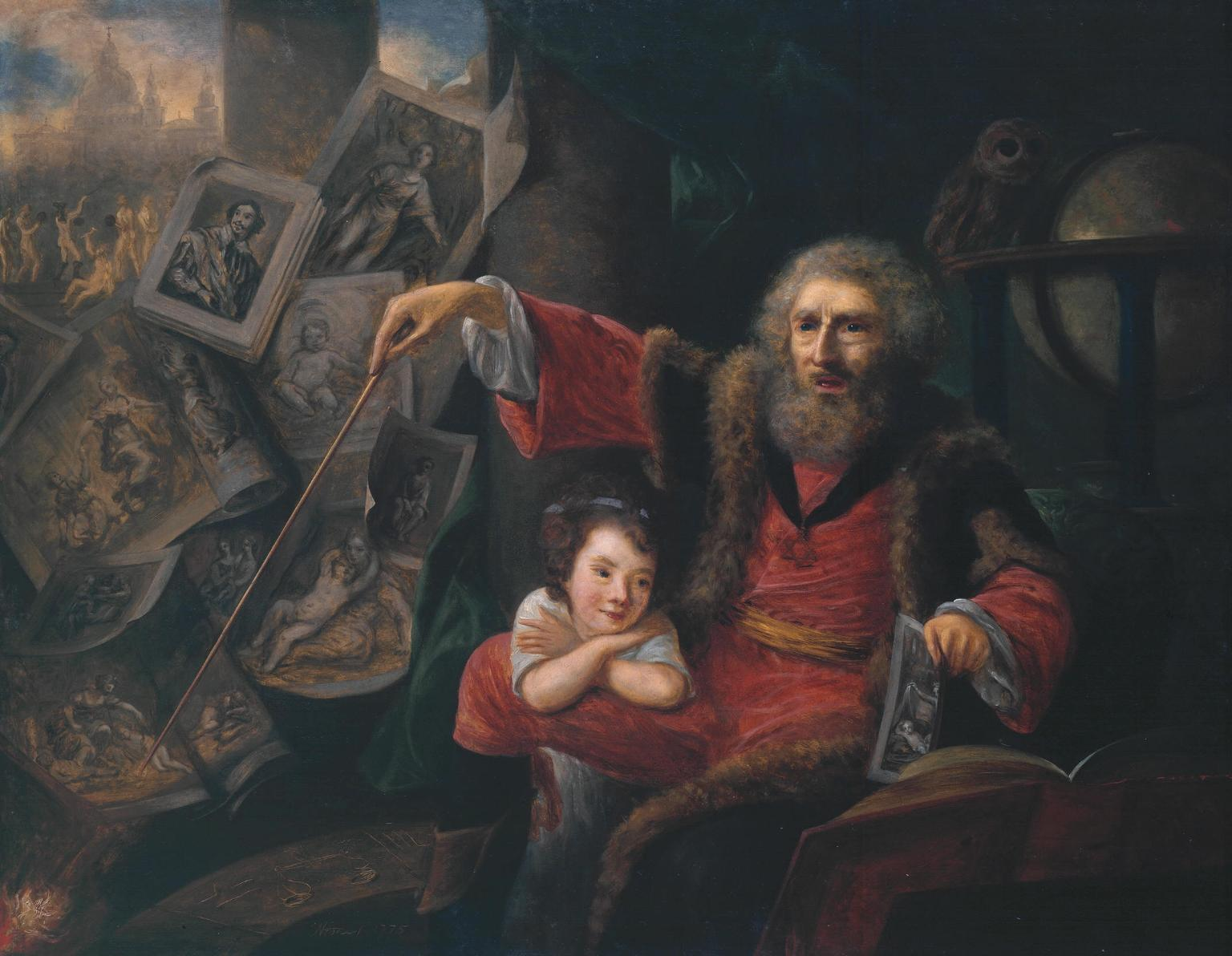
Nathaniel Hone's painting The Conjuror (1775), satirizing Sir Joshua Reynolds and alluding to a romance with the younger Angelica Kauffman.

Her friendship with Reynolds was criticized in 1775 by fellow Academician Nathaniel Hone, who courted controversy in 1775 with his satirical picture The Conjurer. (Note: The original sketch was discovered in Brazil in September 1966 and bought by Tate Britain the following year. The finished painting's whereabouts were unknown until it appeared at auction in 1944. It was acquired in 1967 and is now in the National Gallery of Ireland in Dublin.) It was seen to attack the fashion for Italian Renaissance art and to ridicule Sir Joshua Reynolds, leading the Royal Academy to reject the painting. It also originally included a nude caricature of Kauffman in the top left corner, which he painted out after she complained to the academy. The combination of a little girl and an old man has also been seen as symbolic of Kauffman and Reynolds's closeness, age difference, and rumoured affair.

From 1769 until 1782, Kauffman was an annual exhibitor with the Royal Academy, sending sometimes as many as seven pictures, generally on classical or allegoric subjects. One of the most notable was Leonardo expiring in the Arms of Francis the First (1778). (Note: King Francis I had become a close friend of Leonardo da Vinci during the artist's last years, and Vasari records that the King held Leonardo's head in his arms as he died. Aside from Kauffman, this story was portrayed in romantic paintings by Ingres, Ménageot and other French artists, though some historians consider it legend rather than fact.)

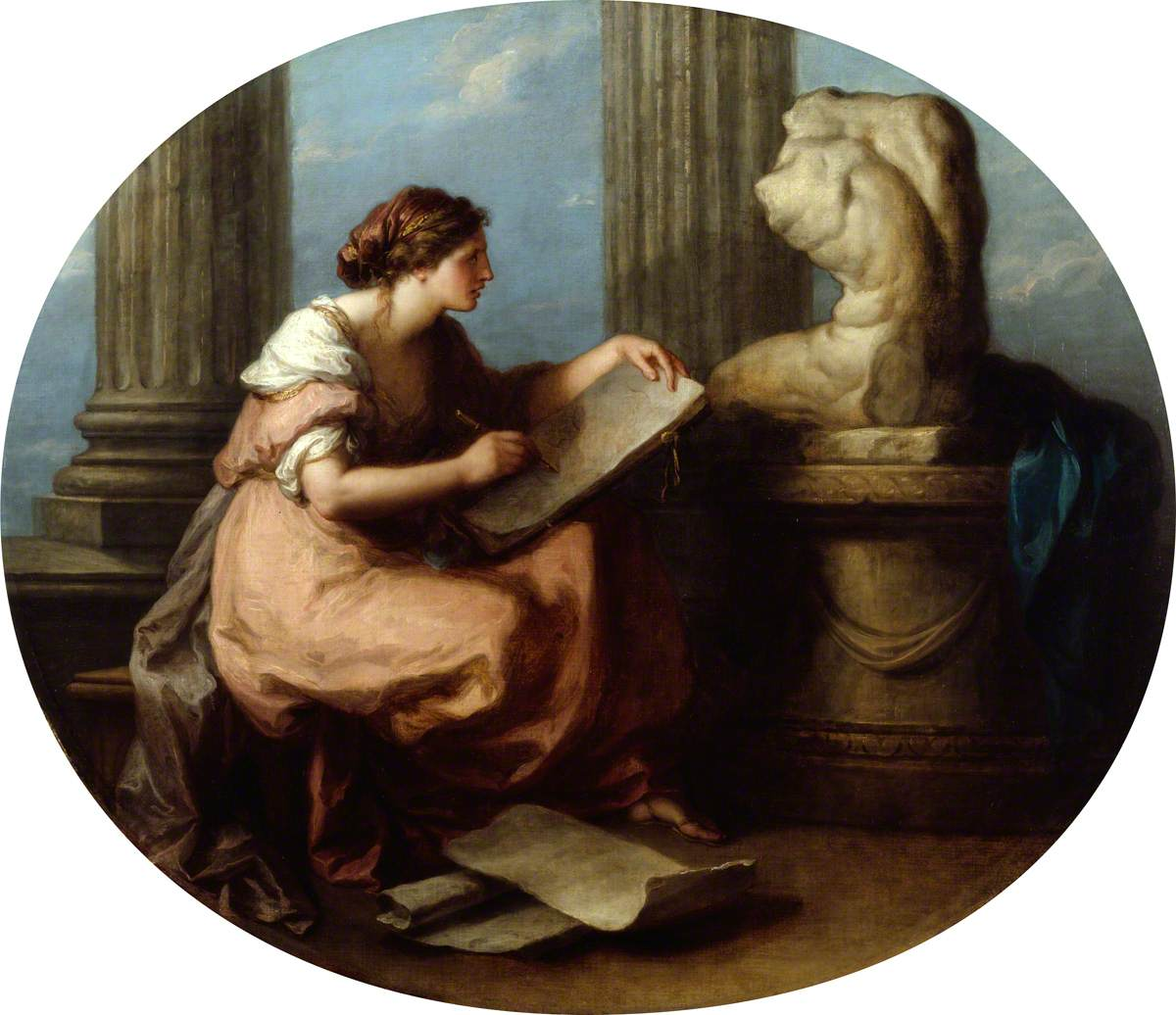
Design (1778–1780), oil on canvas, 126 × 148.5 cm. Royal Academy of Arts, London.

In 1773, she was appointed by the Academy with others to decorate St Paul's Cathedral, a scheme that was never carried out, and, later, with Biagio Rebecca, painted the ceiling of the Academy's Council Room at Somerset House. The work she created here between 1778 and 1780 are perhaps her greatest and most recognizable: a series of paintings, titled The Elements of Art, depicting Invention, Design, Composition, and Coloring. Kauffman's allegorical paintings represent the principles of academic art theory. Giuseppe Marc'Antonio Baretti, known as Joseph in England, celebrated the series of paintings as "executed with all that grace, elegance and accuracy which distinguish the best productions of this Extraordinary lady." The Council Room, members of the academy, and depictions of Kauffman's Design and Composition can be seen in Henry Singleton's painting, The Royal Academicians in General Assembly (1795).

== History painting ==
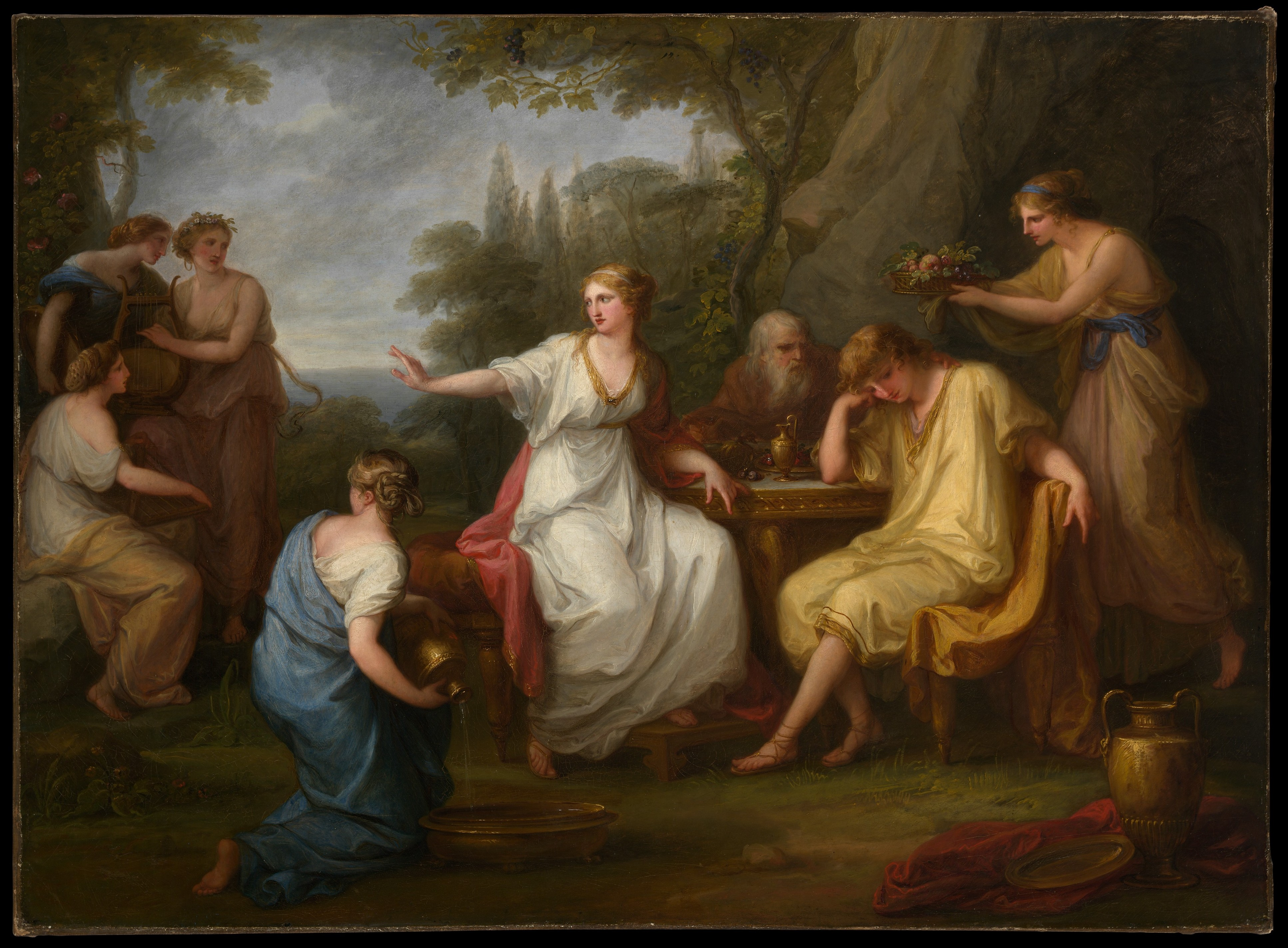
The Sorrow of Telemachus (1783), oil on canvas, 83.2 x 114.3 cm. Metropolitan Museum of Art, New York

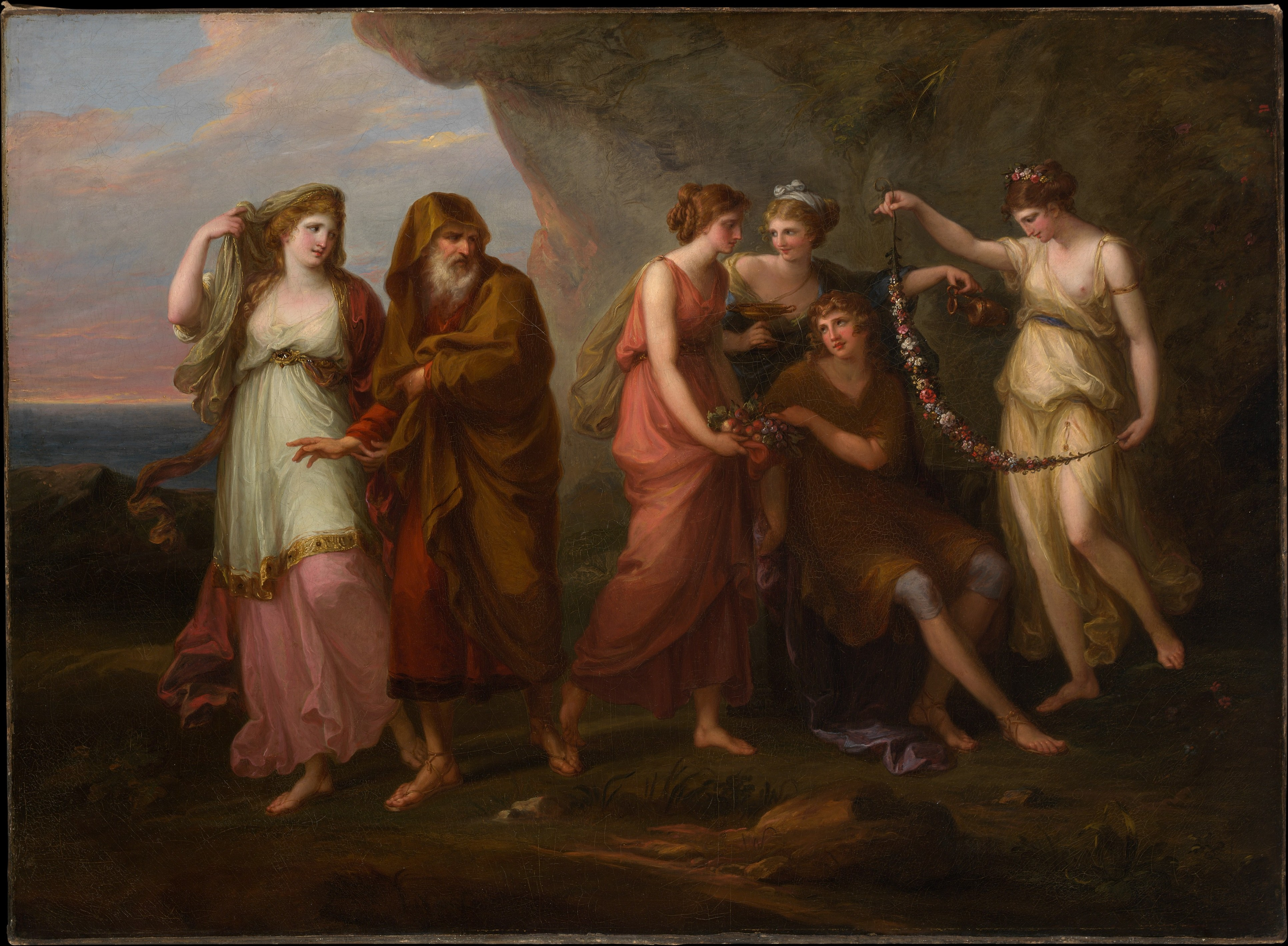
Telemachus and the Nymphs of Calypso (1782), oil on canvas, 82.6 x 112.4 cm., Metropolitan Museum of Art, New York

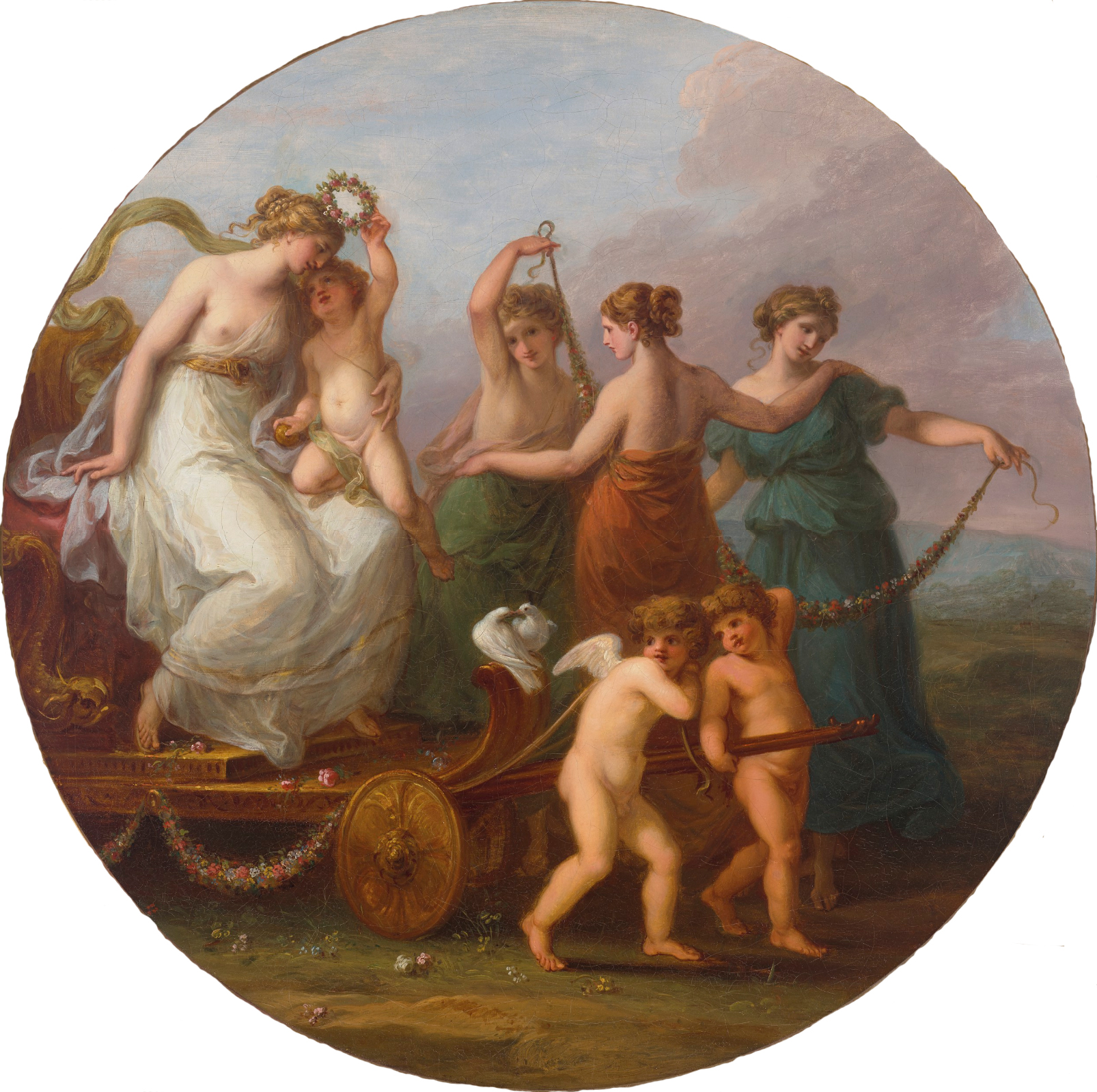
The Triumph of Venus with the Three Graces

While Kauffman produced portraits, and self-portraits, she identified herself primarily as a history painter, an unusual designation for a woman artist in the 18th century. History painting was considered the most elite and lucrative category in academic painting during this time period and, under the direction of Sir Joshua Reynolds, the Royal Academy made a strong effort to promote it to a native audience more interested in commissioning and buying portraits and landscapes. Despite Kauffman's popularity in British society and her success there as an artist, she was disappointed by the relative apathy of the British towards history painting. Ultimately, she left Britain for Rome, where history painting was better established, held in higher esteem and patronized.

History painting, as defined in academic art theory, was classified as the most elevated category. Its subject matter was the representation of human actions based on themes from history, mythology, literature, and scripture. This required extensive learning in biblical and Classical literature, knowledge of art theory and practical training that included the study of anatomy from the male nude. Most women were denied access to such training, especially the opportunity to draw from nude models; yet Kauffman managed to cross the gender boundary. She studied works from artists including Titian, Raphael, Correggio, Domenichino, and Guido Reni, and learned to depict male anatomy through copying drawings, engravings and plaster casts. This can be seen in depictions of Kauffman, such as her painting titled Design and a portrait by Nathaniel Dance. The male figures in her artworks are seen as being more feminine than most painters would choose to display, which may be a result of her lack of formal training in male anatomy.

== Later years in Rome ==
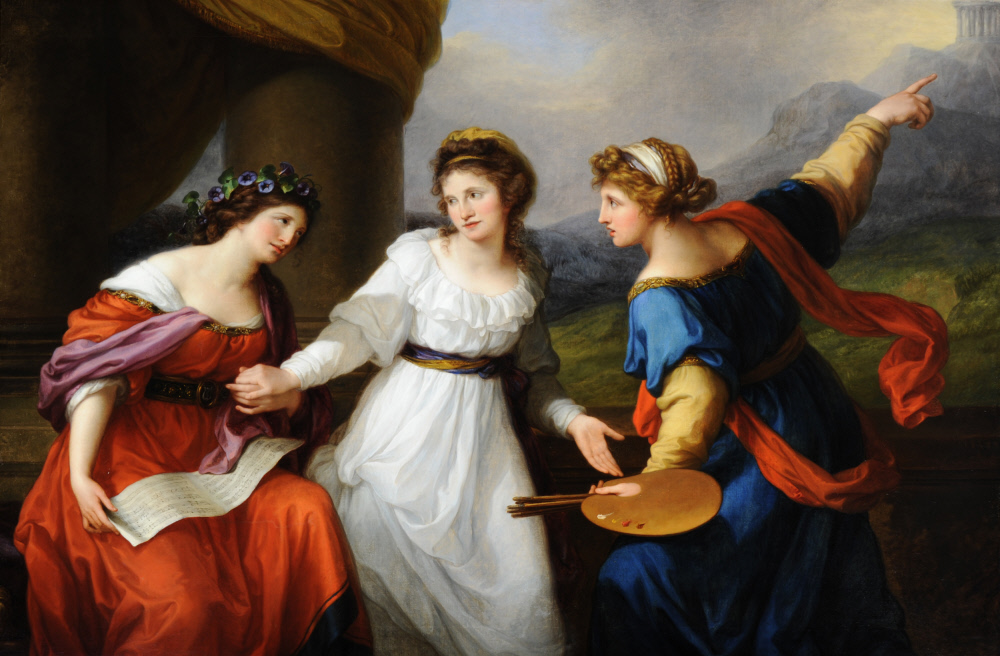
Self-Portrait Hesitating Between Painting and Music (1794). oil on canvas, 147 x: 216 cm. Nostell Priory, West Yorkshire

In 1781, after her first husband's death (she had long been separated from him), she married Antonio Zucchi, a Venetian artist then resident in England. Shortly afterwards, she retired to Rome, where she befriended, among others, Johann Wolfgang von Goethe; yet, always restive, she wanted to do more and lived for another 25 years with much of her old prestige intact.

In 1782, Kauffman's father died, as did her husband in 1795. In 1794, she painted, Self-Portrait Hesitating Between Painting and Music, in which she emphasises the difficult choice she had faced in choosing painting as her sole career, in dedication to her mother's death. She continued at intervals to contribute to the Royal Academy in London, her last exhibit being in 1797. After this, she produced little, and in 1807 she died in Rome, being honoured with a splendid funeral under the direction of Canova. The entire Academy of St Luke, with numerous ecclesiastics and virtuosi, followed her to her tomb in Sant'Andrea delle Fratte, and, as at the burial of Raphael, two of her best pictures were carried in procession.

== Legacy ==
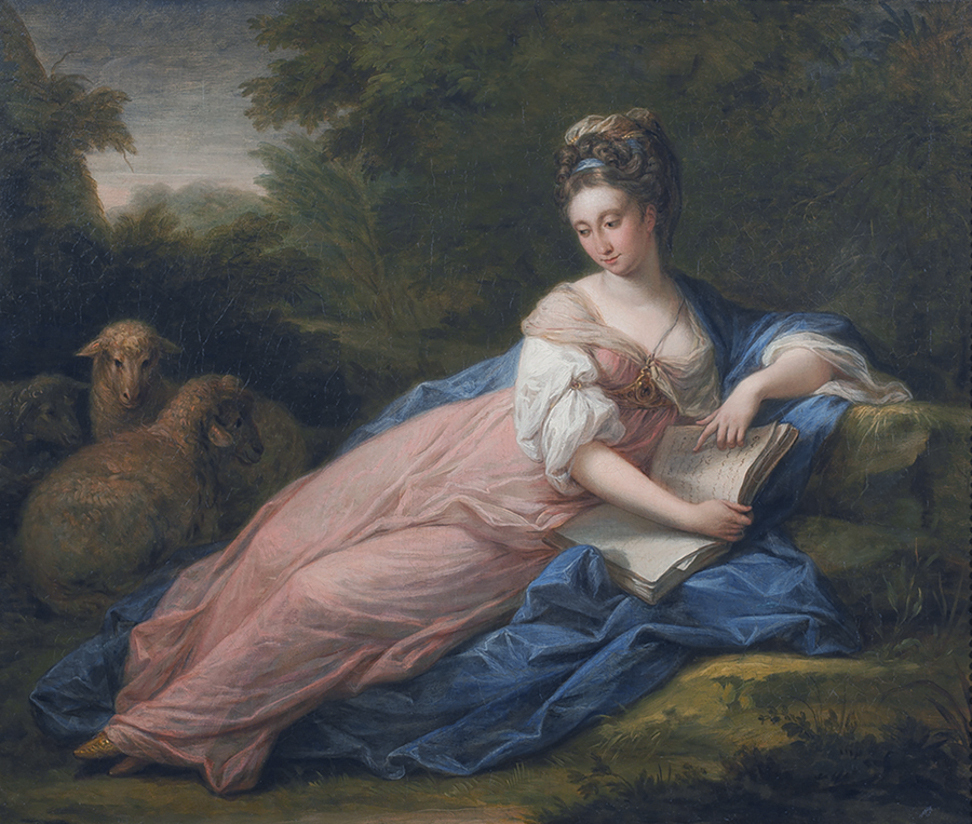
Mary Tisdall, Dublin (1771–1772)

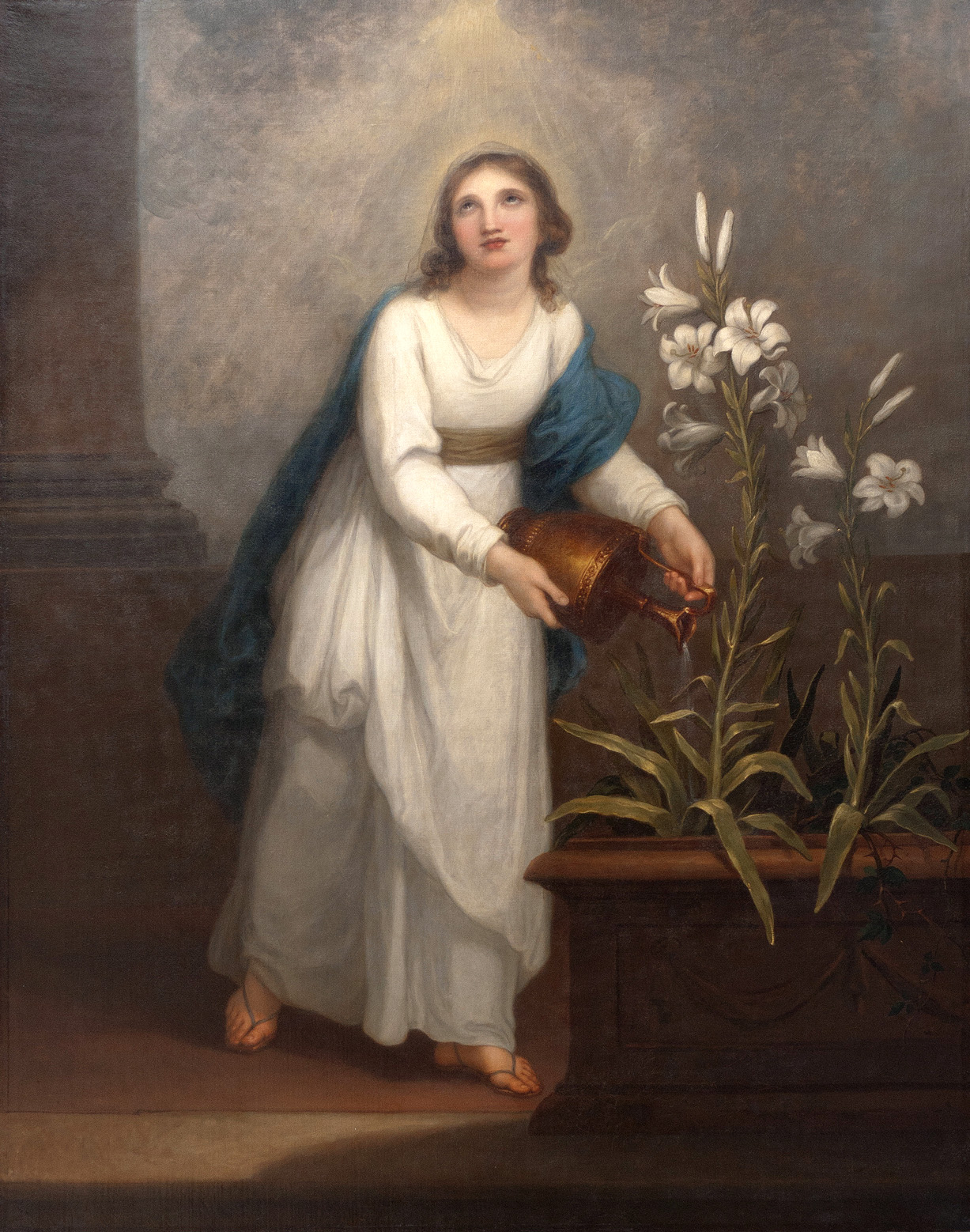
Christian Allegory, 1798, Brest's Museum of Fine Arts

By the time of her death she had made herself what she considered to be a renowned artist. This explains why her funeral was directed by the well-known Neoclassical sculptor Antonio Canova. Canova designed her funeral based on the funeral of the Renaissance master Raphael.

By 1911, rooms decorated with her work were still to be seen in various places. At Hampton Court was a portrait of the duchess of Brunswick; in the National Portrait Gallery, a self-portrait.

There were other pictures by her in Paris, at Dresden, in the Hermitage at St Petersburg, in the Alte Pinakothek at Munich, in Kadriorg Palace, Tallinn (Estonia) and in the Joanneum Alte Galerie at Graz. The Munich example was another portrait of herself, and there was a third in the Uffizi at Florence. A few of her works in private collections were exhibited among the Old Masters at Burlington House.

Kauffman is well known for the numerous engravings from her designs by Schiavonetti, Francesco Bartolozzi and others. Those by Bartolozzi especially found considerable favour with collectors. Charles Willson Peale, artist, patriot, and founder of a major American art dynasty, named several of his children after notable European artists, including a daughter, Angelica Kauffman Peale.

A biography of Kauffman was published in 1810 by Giovanni Gherardo De Rossi. The book was the basis of a romance by Léon de Wailly (1838), and it prompted the novel contributed by Anne Isabella Thackeray to the Cornhill Magazine in 1875 entitled Miss Angel.

The English novelist Miranda Miller published a 2020 novel entitled Angelica, Paintress of Minds, which purports to be an autobiography written during Kauffman's last days in Rome. The Historical Novel Society says of the book: "Kauffmann is presented as hard-working, loyal, kind, sometimes susceptible but more determined than she thinks she is."

From September 2018 to August 2019, the Royal Academy hosted an exhibition by Sarah Pickstone, An Allegory of Painting, which paid homage to works by Kauffman that the Academy had commissioned. Pickstone's The Rainbow reinterpreted Kauffman's Colour, with Belvedere a response to Kauffman's Design.

=== Angelika Kauffmann Museum ===
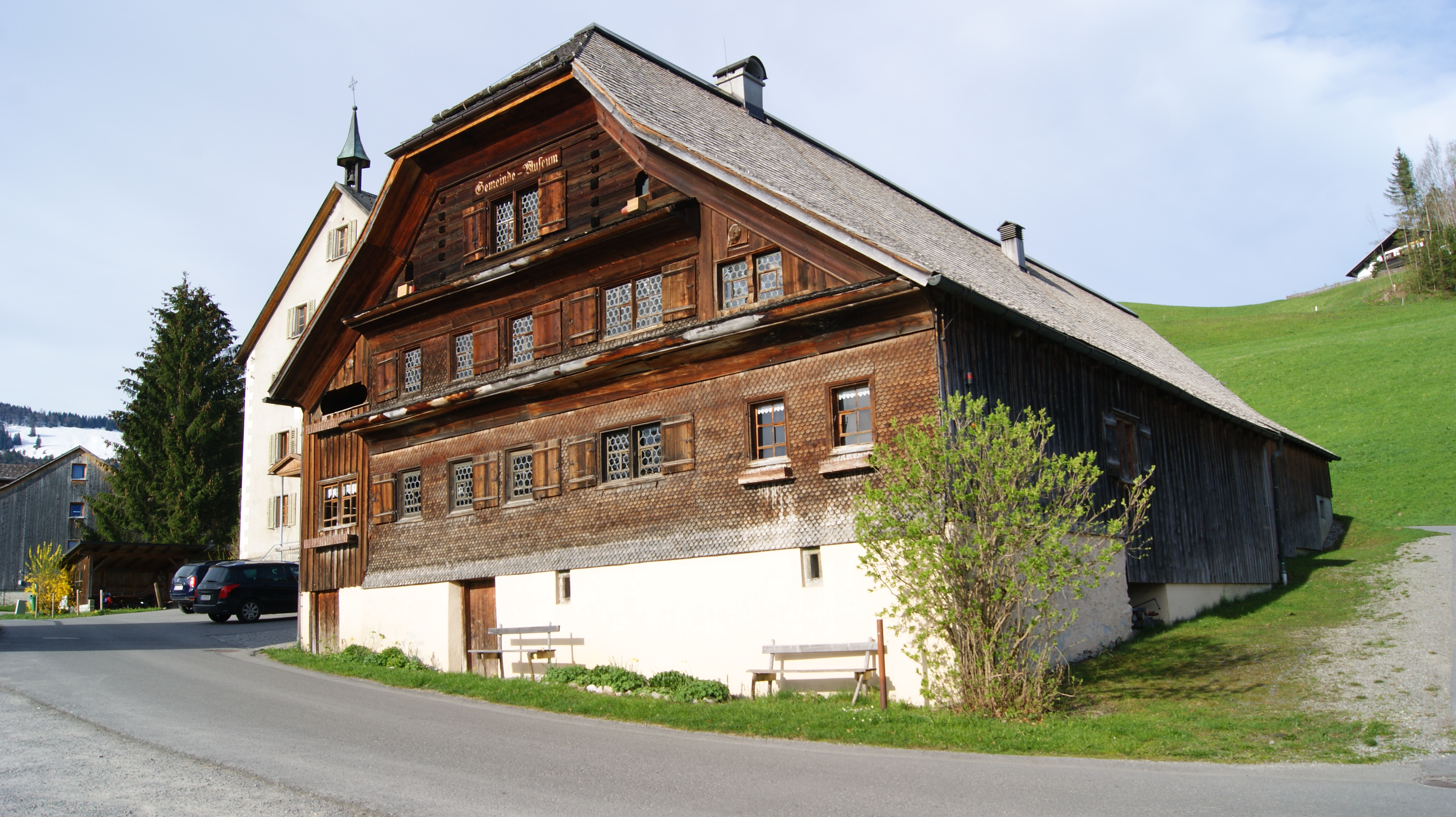
The Angelika Kauffmann Museum in Schwarzenberg (Vorarlberg, Austria)

The Angelika Kauffmann Museum in Schwarzenberg, Vorarlberg (Austria) was established in 2007. This location is in the same area that her father called home. The annually changing exhibitions focus on different aspects and themes of her artistic work. In the 2019 exhibition Angelika Kauffmann – Unknown Treasures from Vorarlberg Private Collections, many of her paintings were shown to the public for the first time, as a large proportion of her oeuvre is owned by private collectors. The museum is housed in the so-called "Kleberhaus", an old farmhouse (1556) in the typical architectural style of the region.

== Galleries ==
=== History painting ===
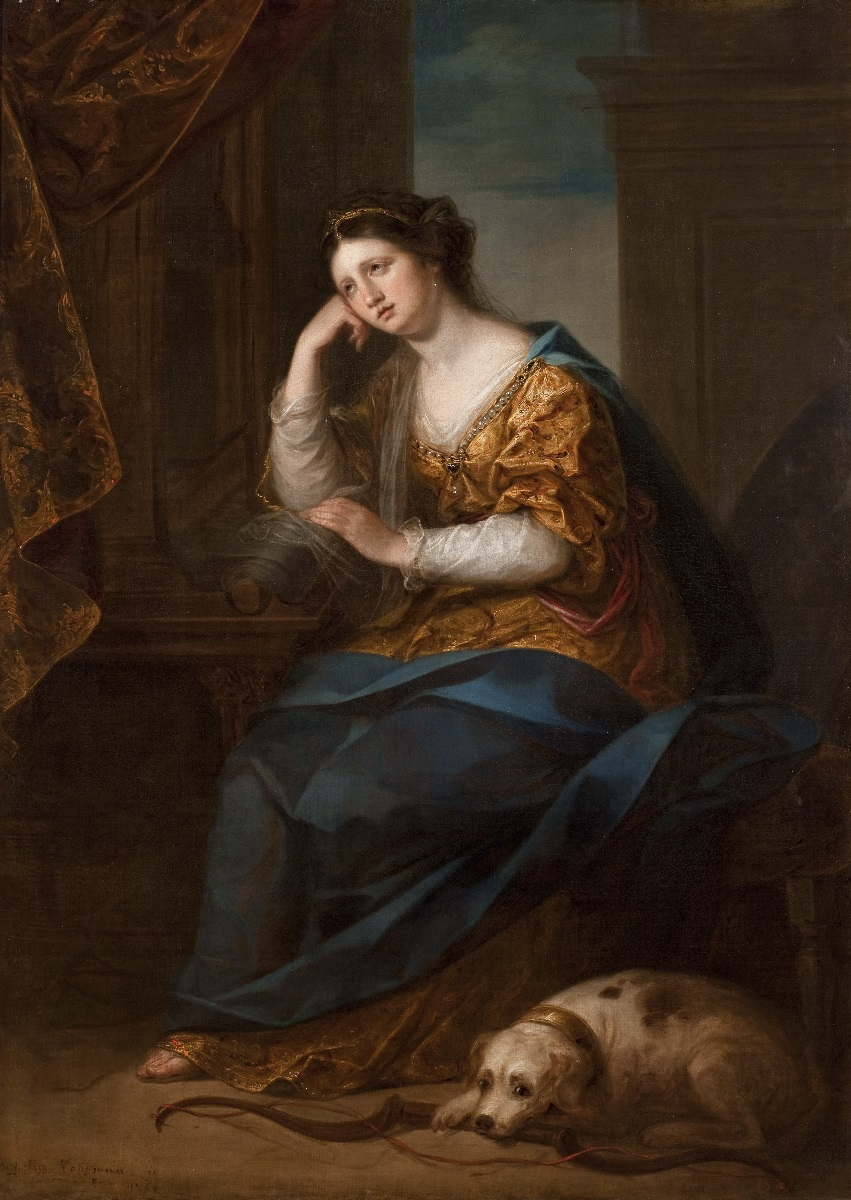
Penelope at Her Loom (1764), oil on canvas, Brighton Pavilion

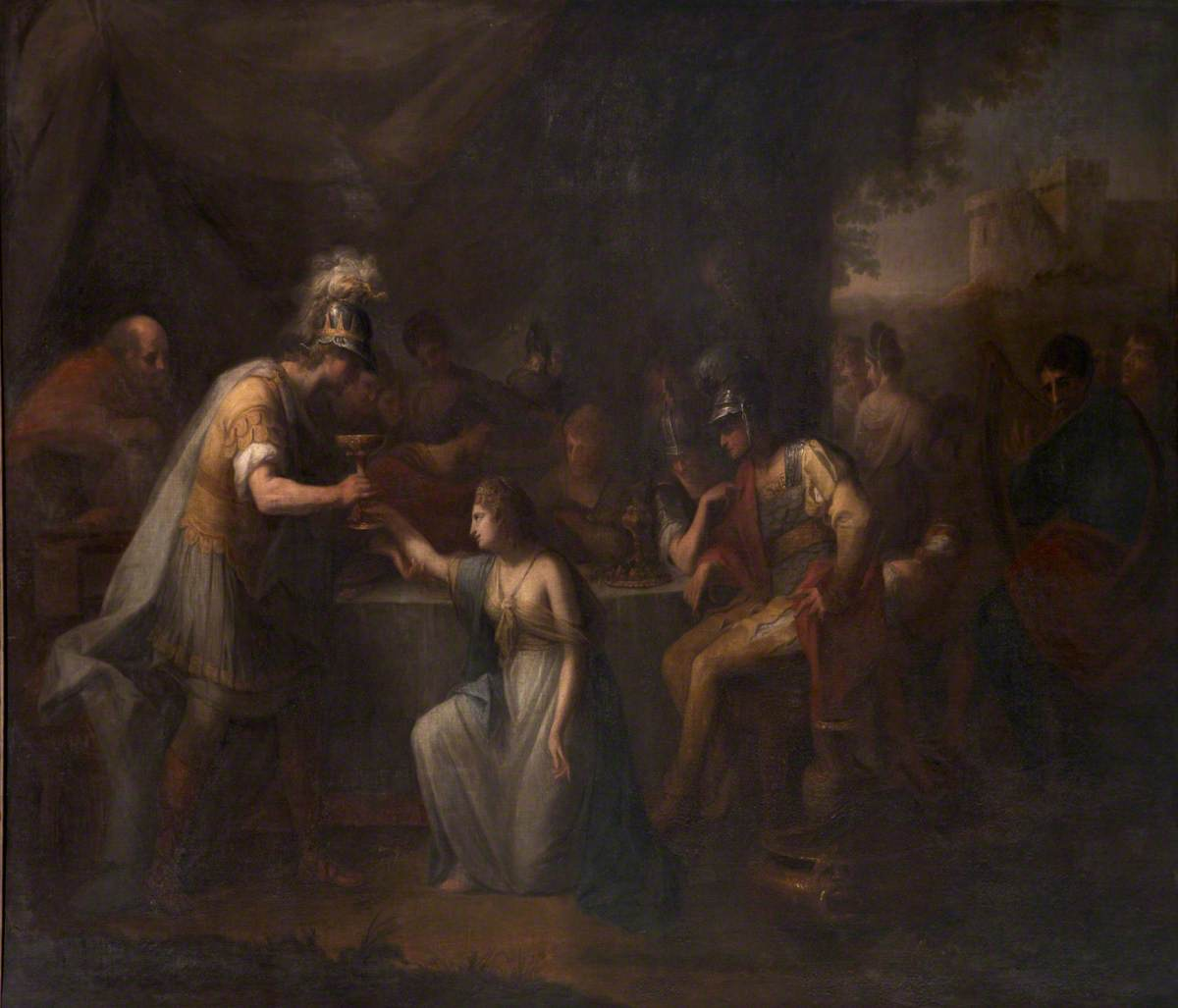
Vortigern and Rowena (1770), Saltram House

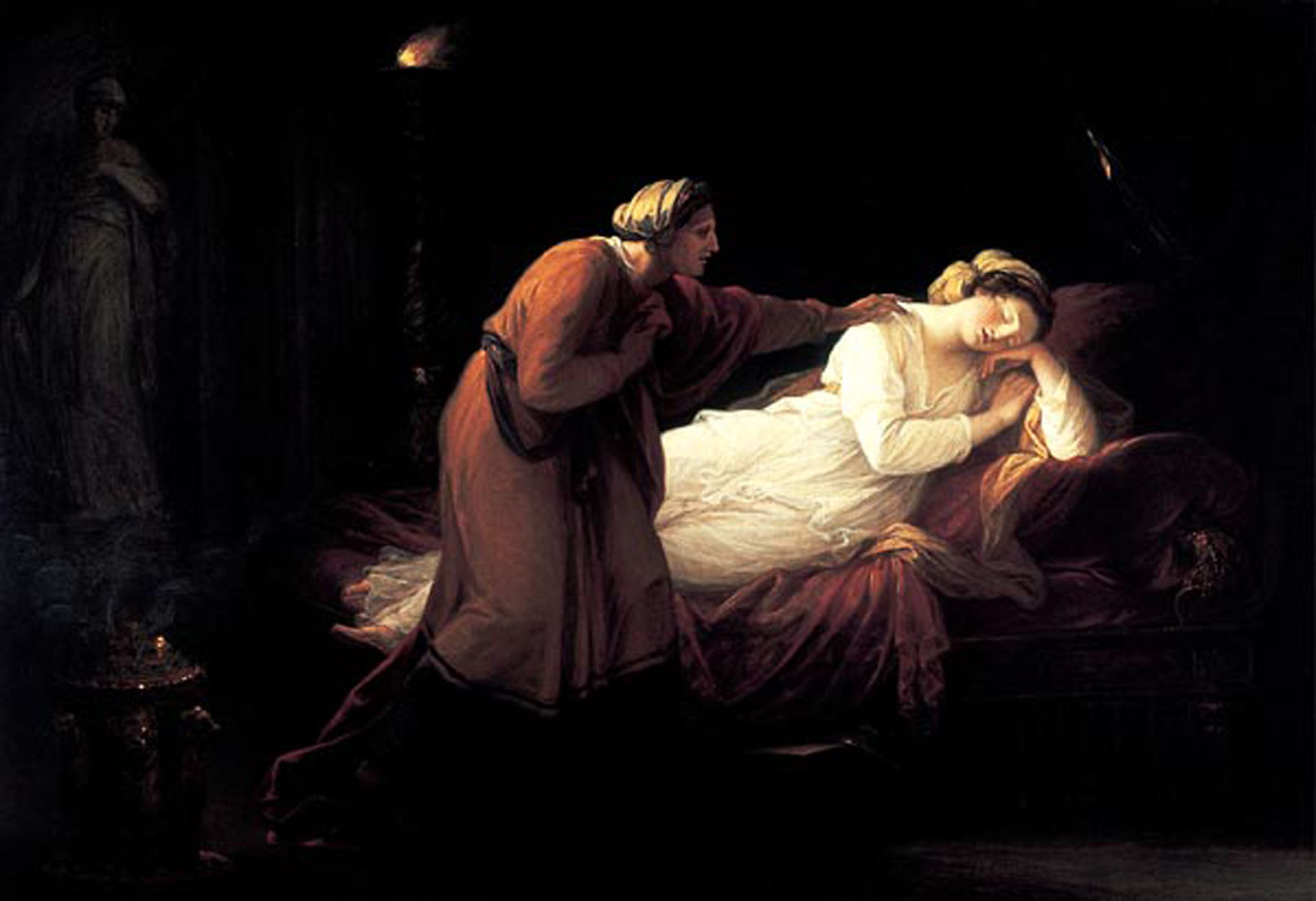
Penelope Waken by Eurykleia (1772), oil on canvas, dimensions unknown, vorarlberg museum, Bregenz

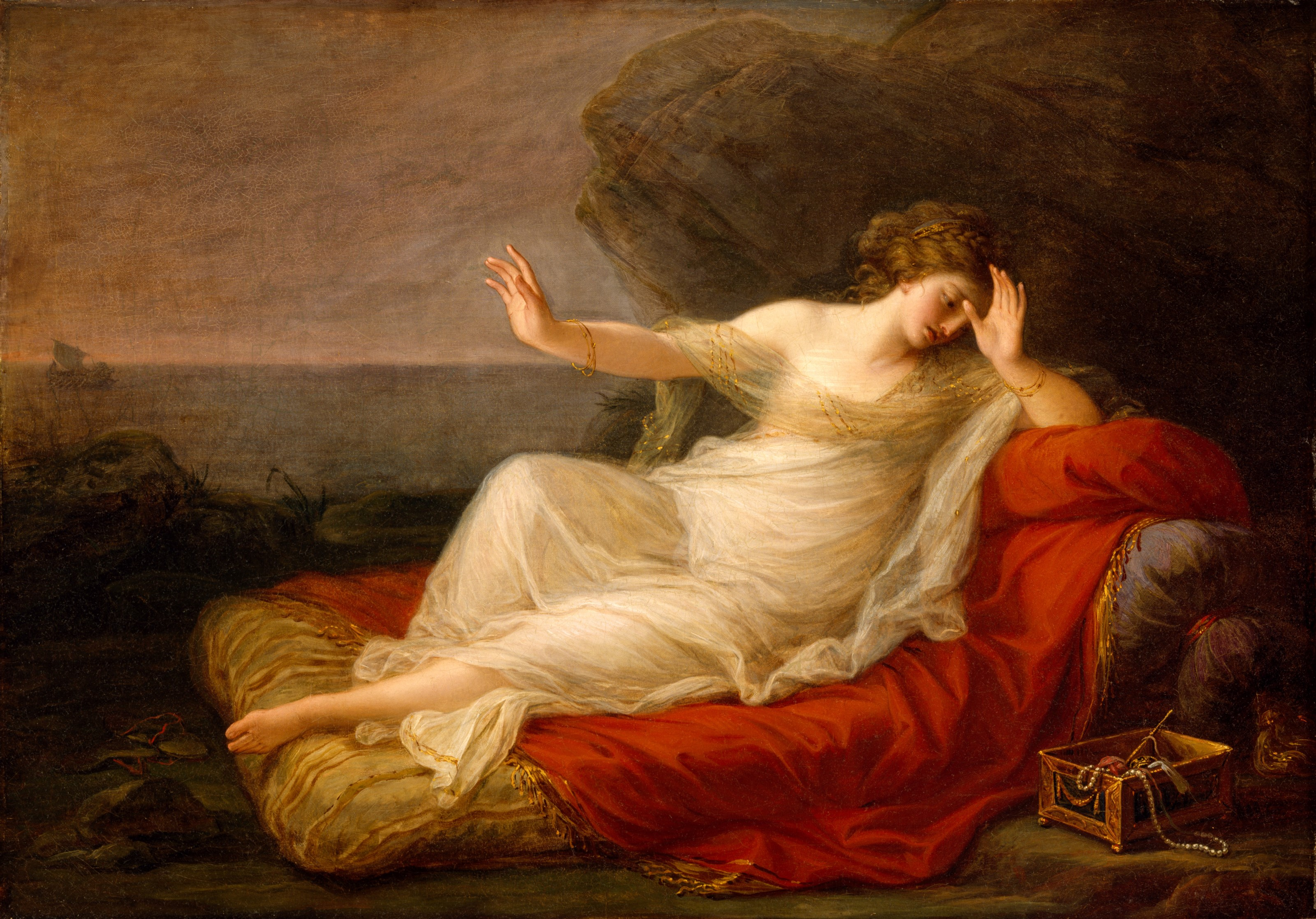
Ariadne Abandoned by Theseus (1774), oil on canvas, 63.8 x 90.9 cm., Museum of Fine Arts, Houston

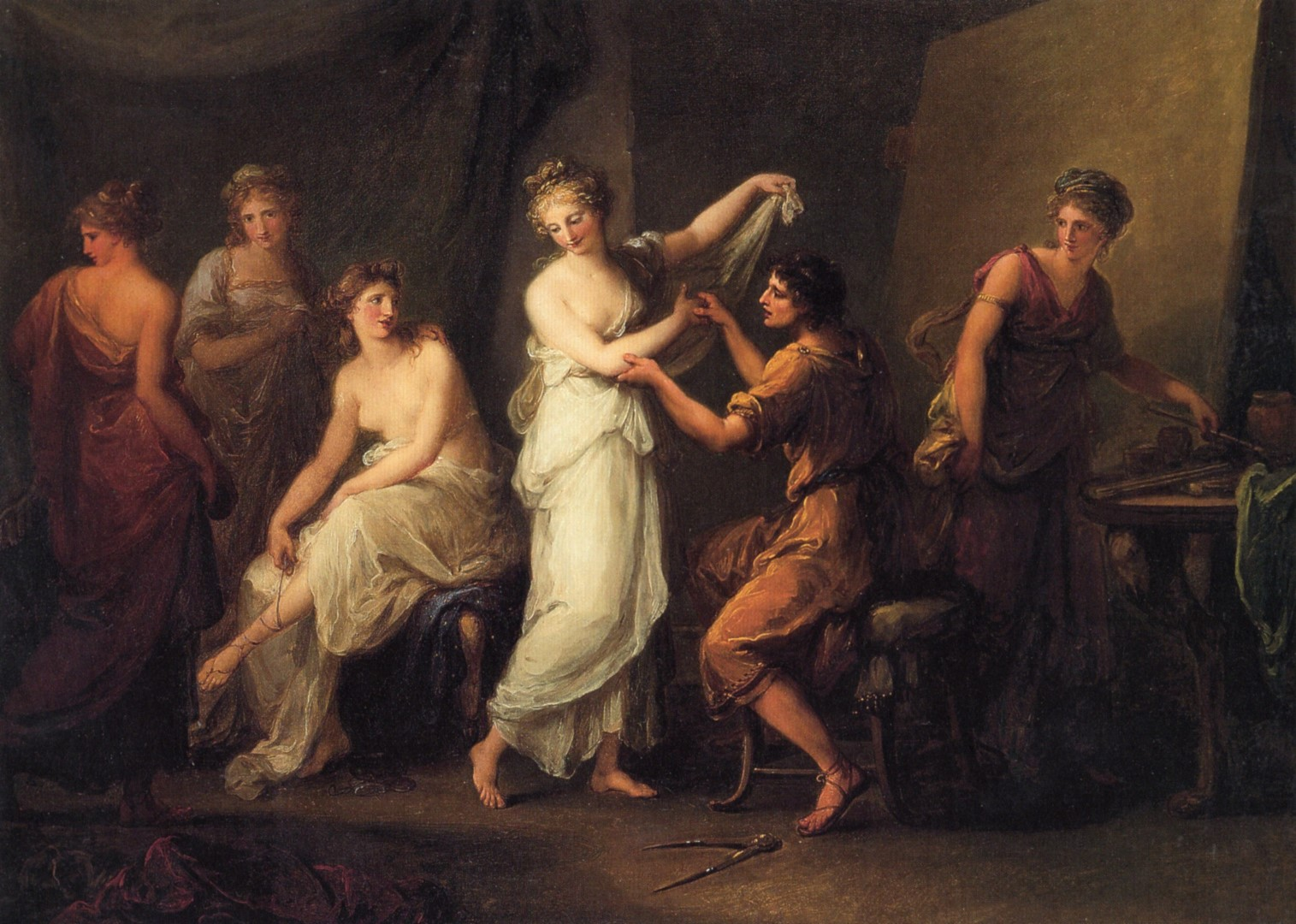
Zeuxis Selecting Models for His Painting of Helen of Troy (c. 1778), oil on canvas, dimensions unknown, Annmary Brown Memorial Library, Brown University, Rhode Island

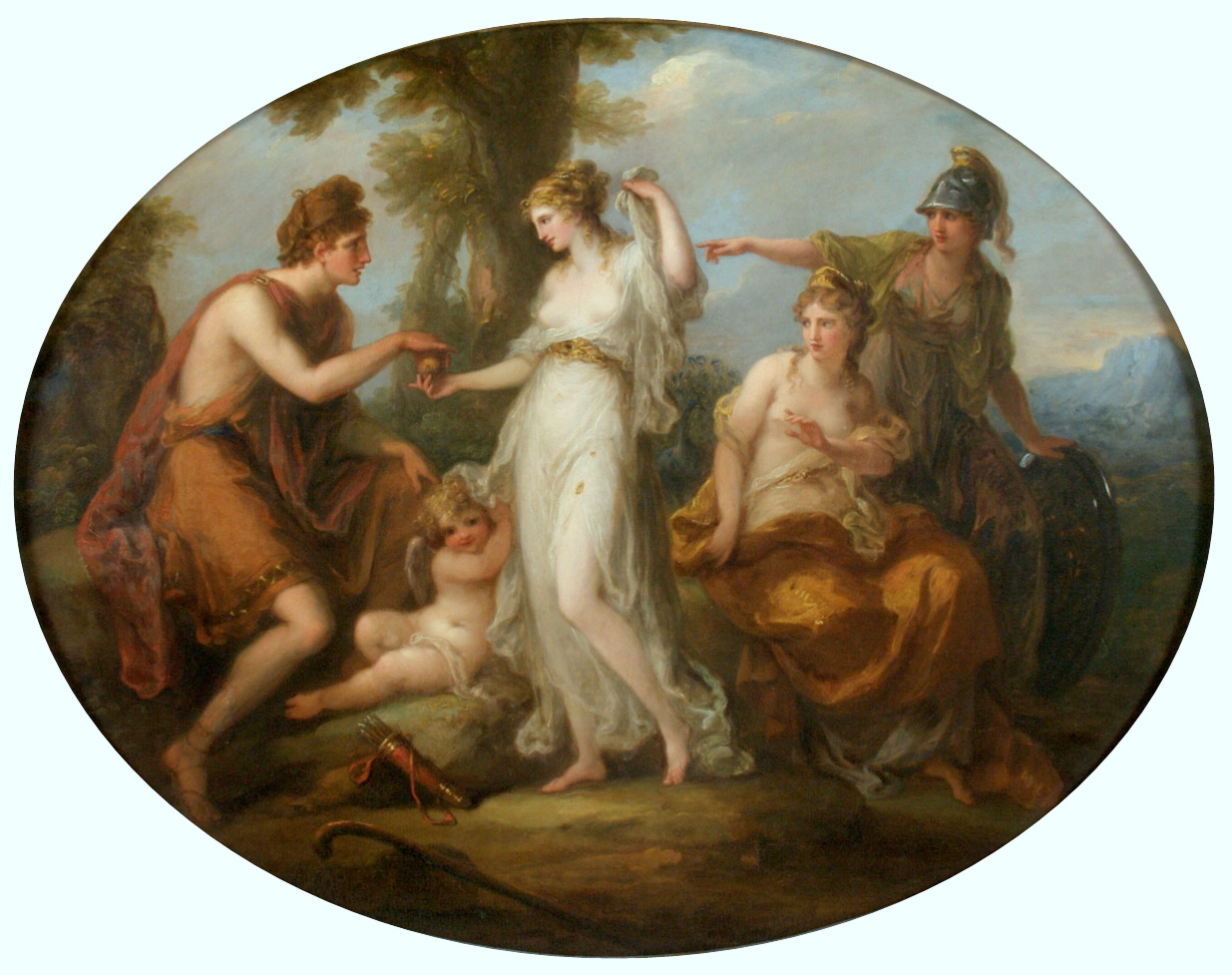
The Judgment of Paris (c. 1781), oil on canvas, 80 x 100.9 cm., Museo de Arte de Ponce, Puerto Rico

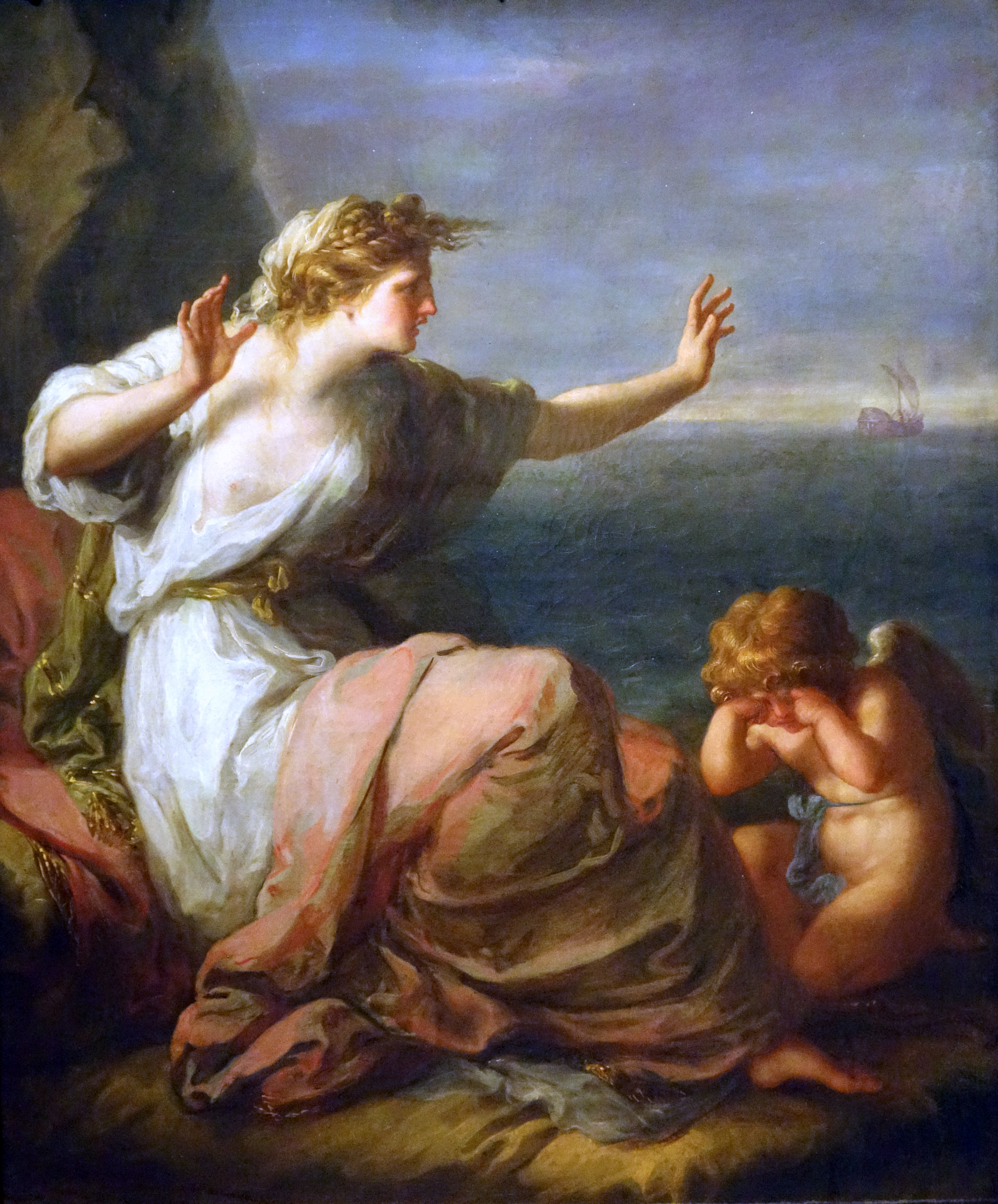
Ariadne left by Theseus (before 1782), oil on canvas, 88 x 70.5 cm., Gemäldegalerie Alte Meister, Dresden

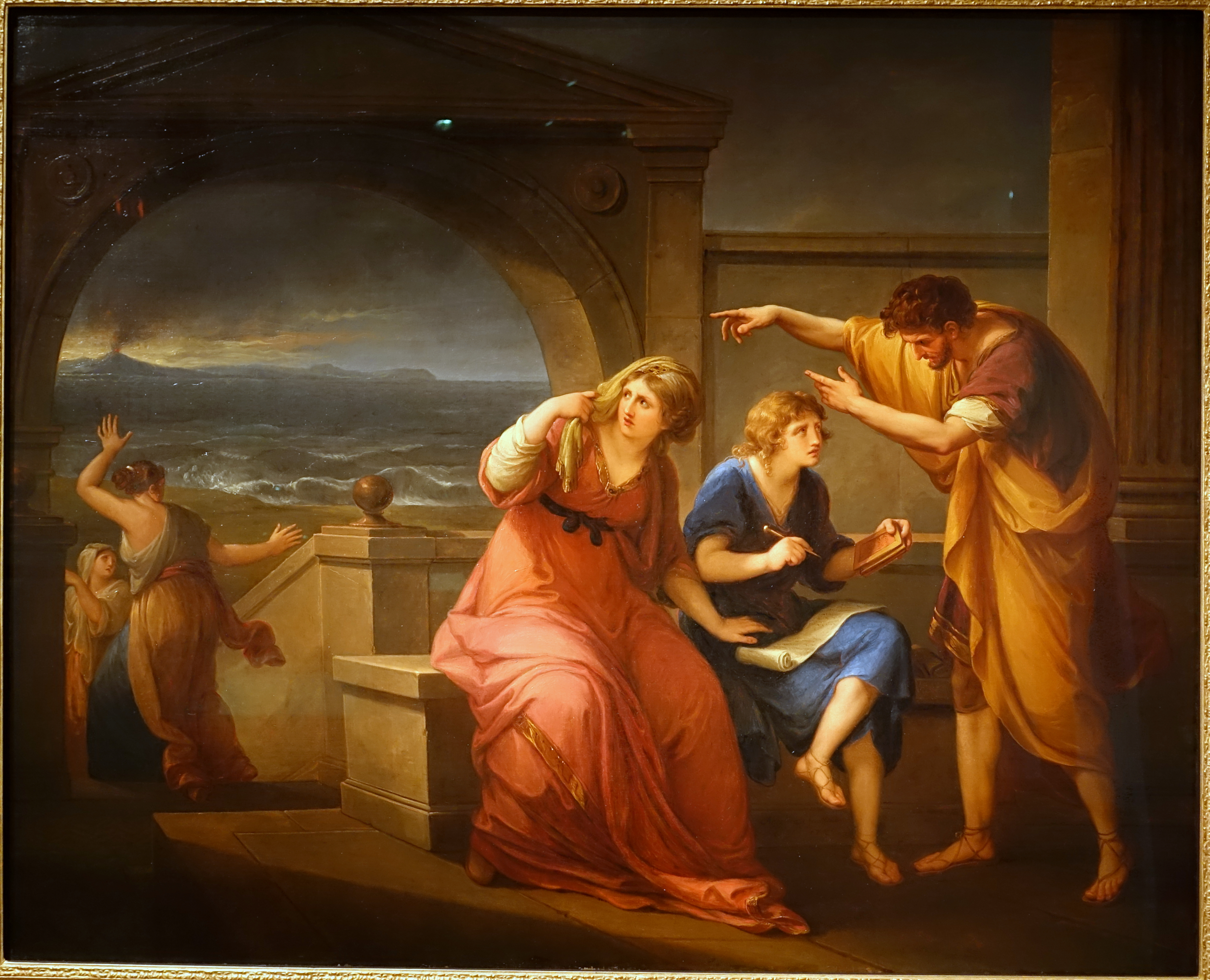
Pliny the Younger and His Mother at Miseno (1785), oil on canvas, 103 x 127.5 cm., Princeton University Art Museum, New Jersey

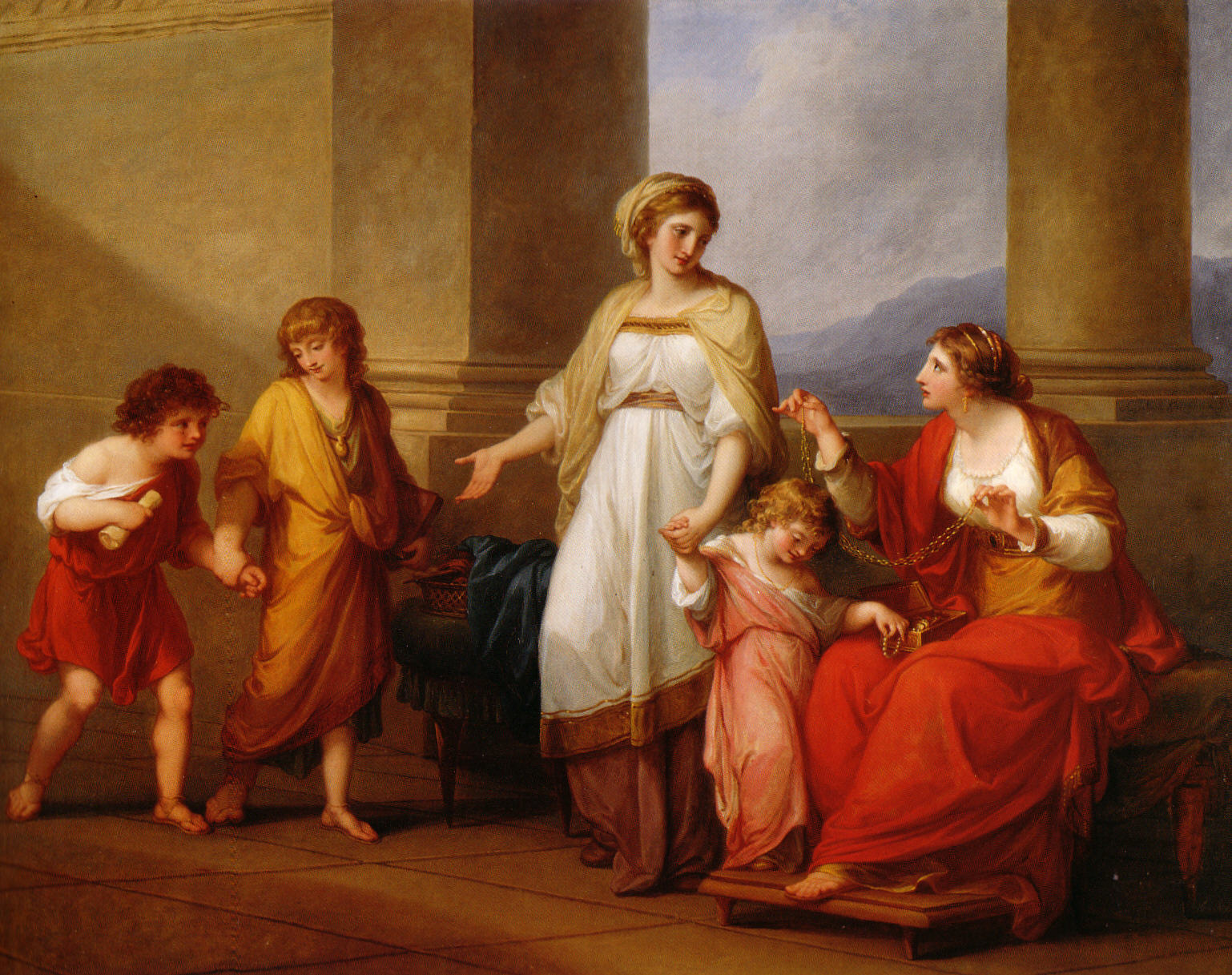
Cornelia, Mother of the Gracchi, Pointing to her Children as Her Treasures (1785), oil on canvas, 101.6 x 127 cm., Virginia Museum of Fine Arts

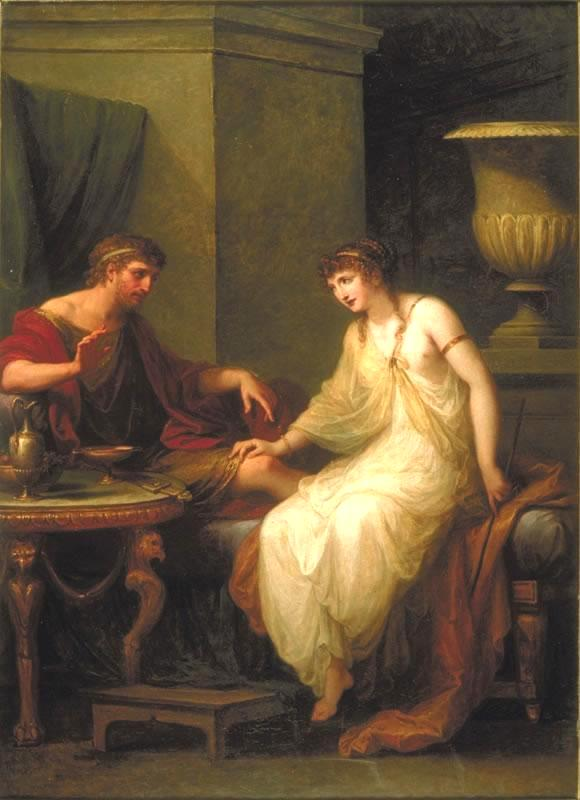
Circe Enticing Ulysses (1786), oil on canvas, dimension and collection unknown

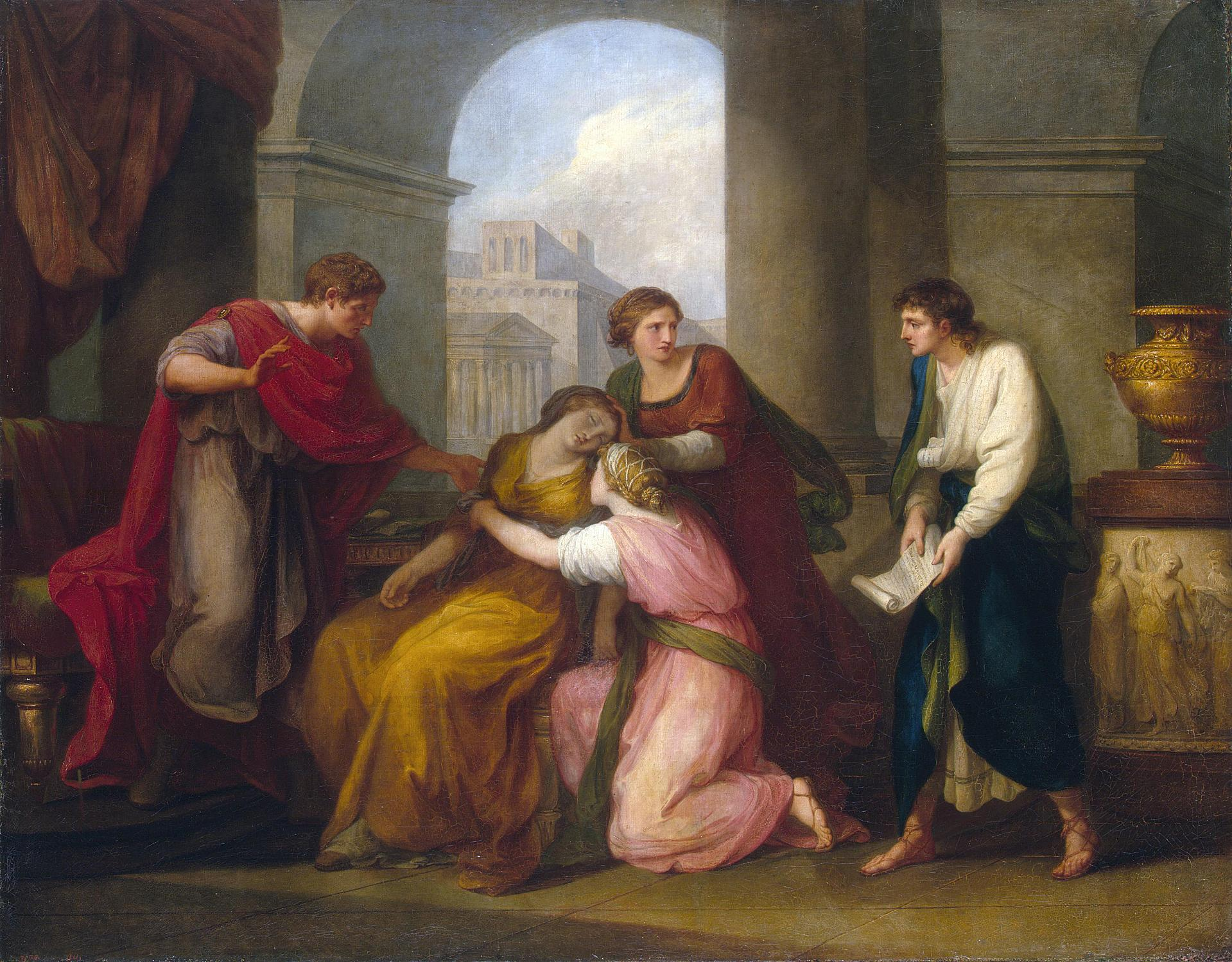
Virgil Reading the Aeneid to Augustus and Octavia (1788), oil on canvas, 123 x 159 cm, Hermitage Museum, Saint Petersburg

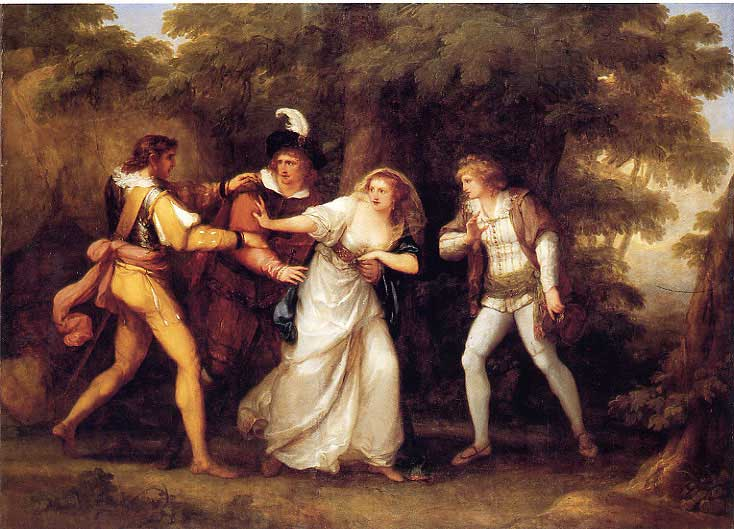
Valentine Rescues Silvia from The Two Gentlemen of Verona (1789), oil on canvas, 61 3/4 in. x 87 in. (156.8 cm x 221 cm), Davis Museum at Wellesley College, Massachusetts

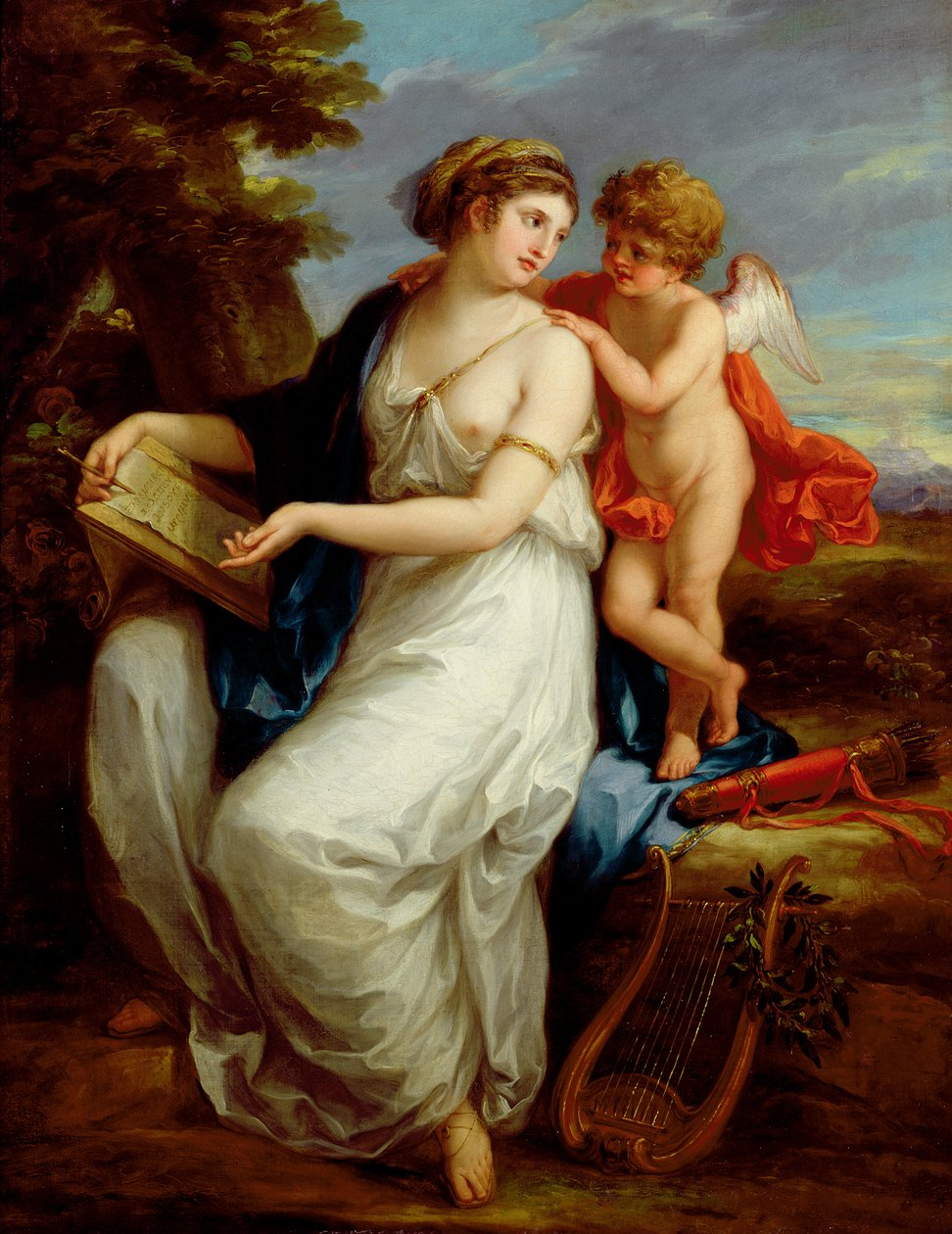
Sappho Inspired by Love (1775), oil on canvas, 111.8 x: 94 cm., John and Mable Ringling Museum of Art, Florida

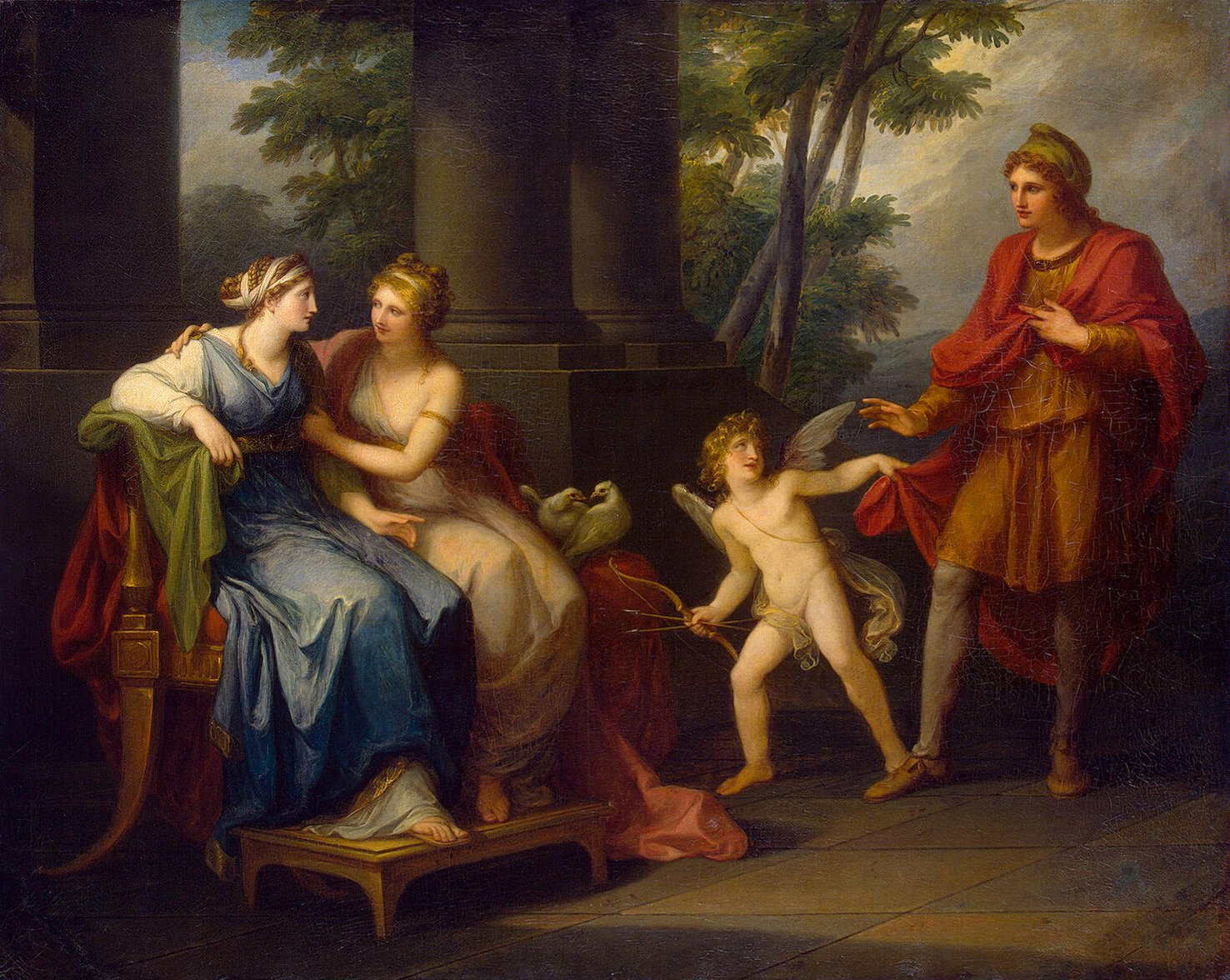
Venus Induces Helen to Fall in Love with Paris (1790), oil on canvas, 102 x 127.5 cm., Hermitage Museum, Saint Petersburg

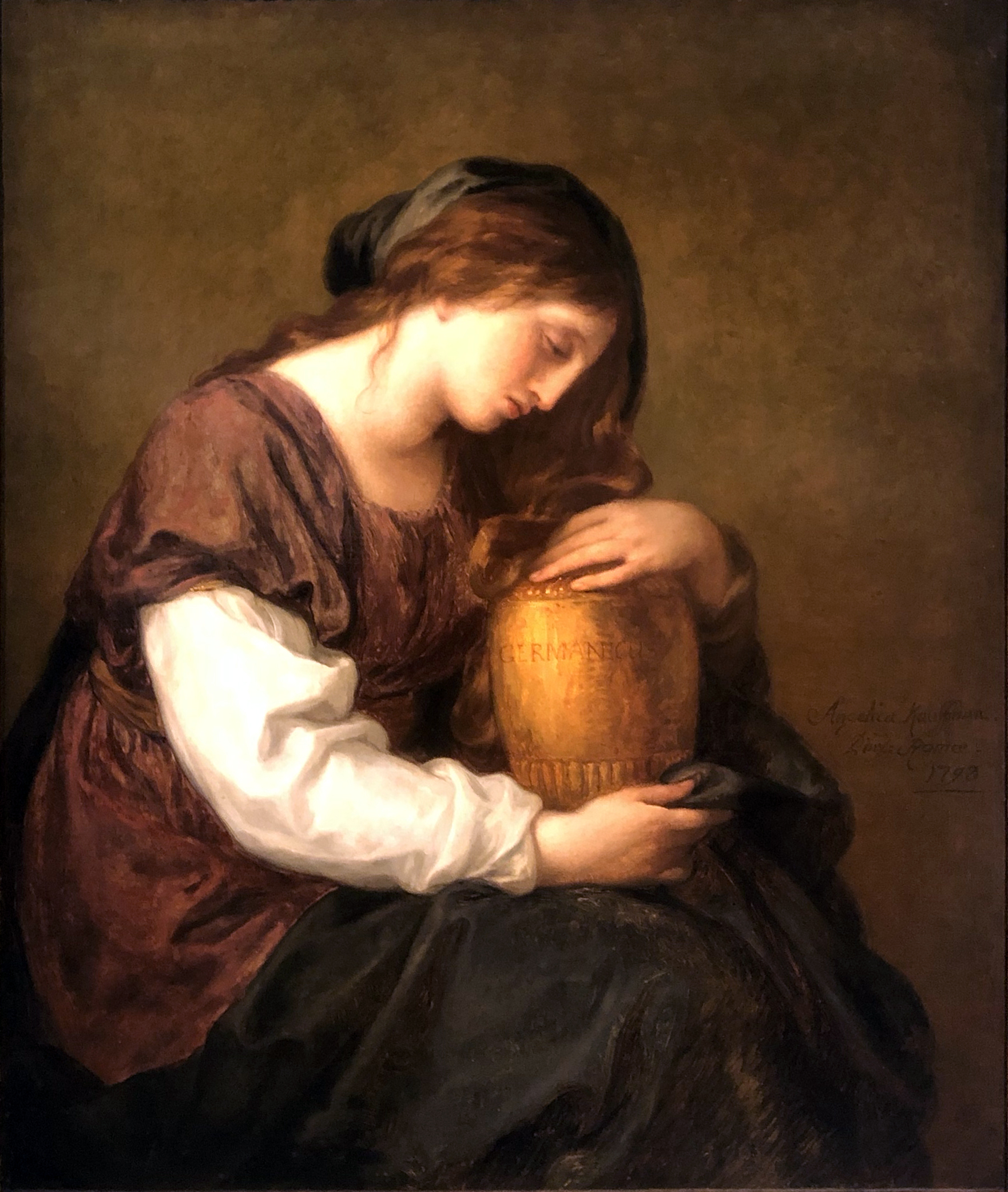
Agrippina Mourns the Urn of Germanicus (1793), oil on canvas, Museum Kunstpalast, Düsseldorf

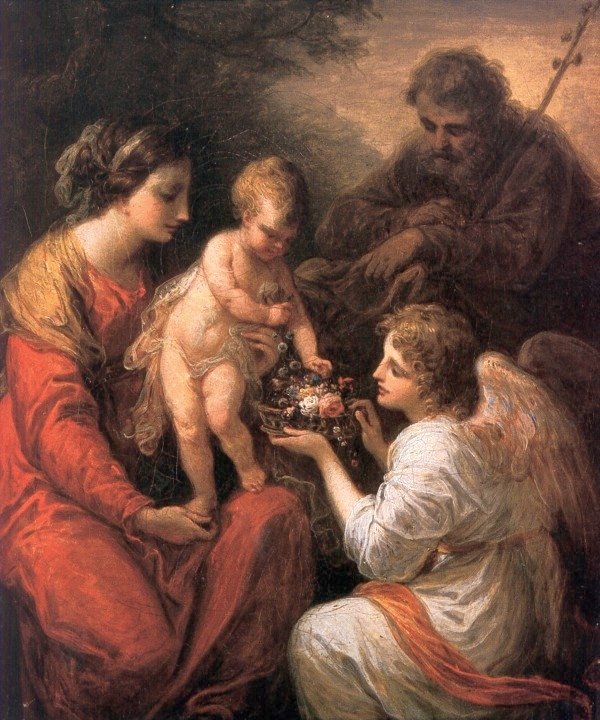
Holy Family with an angel, before 1807, Museum of John Paul II Collection

=== Portraits ===
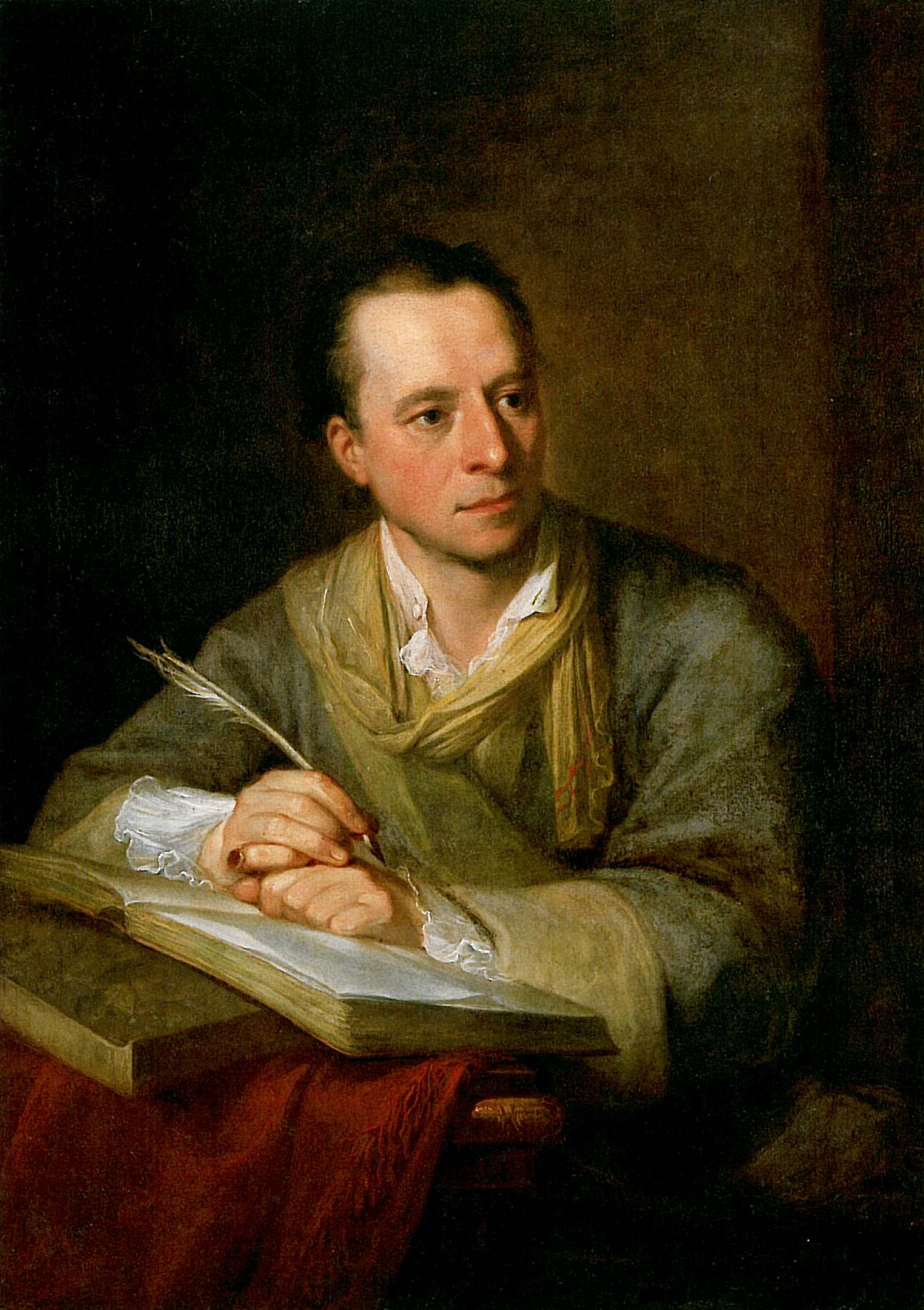
Portrait of Winckelmann (1764), oil on canvas, 97 × 71 cm., Kunsthaus Zürich, Switzerland

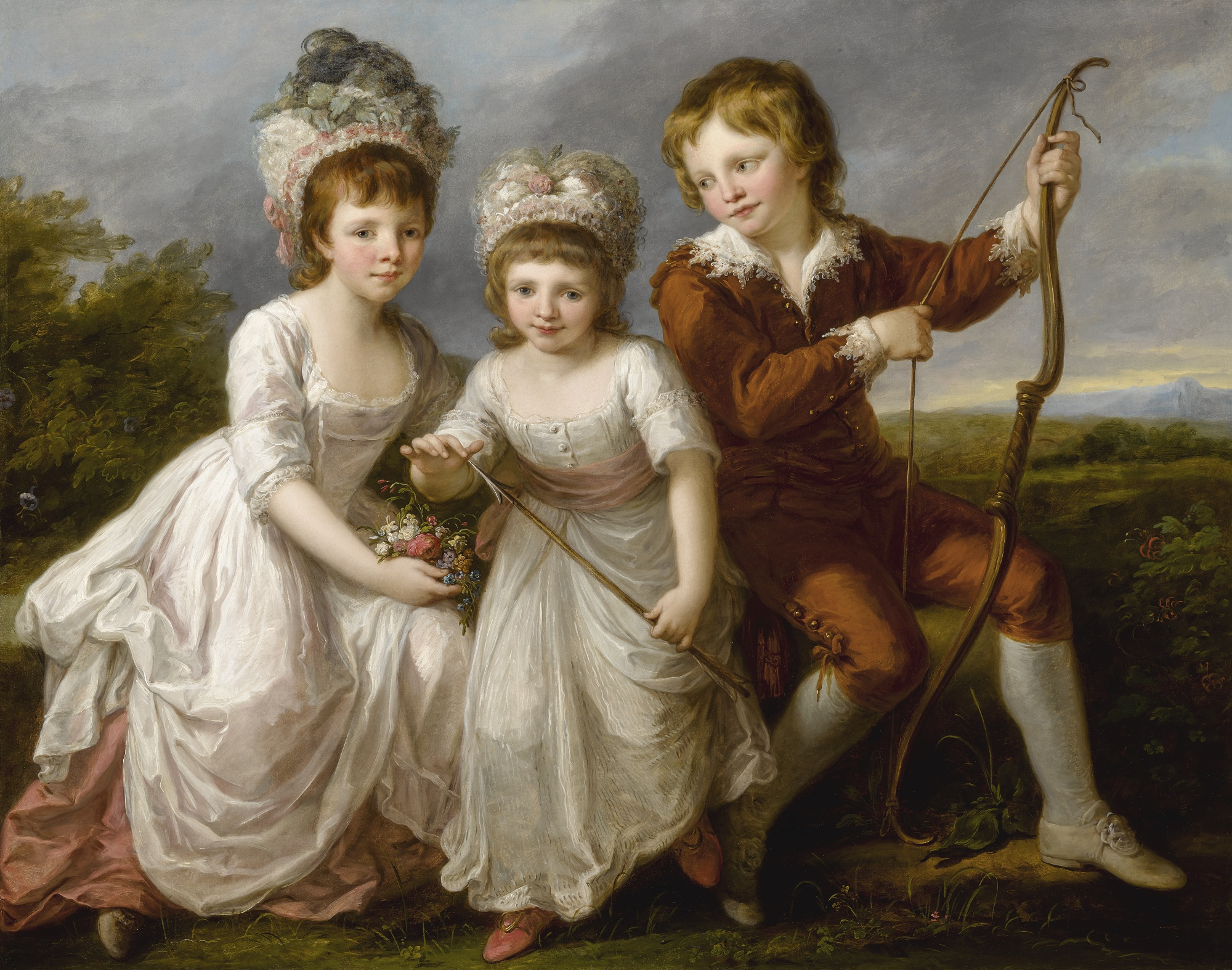
Lady Georgiana Spencer, Henrietta Spencer and George Viscount Althorp (c. 1766), oil on canvas, 113.6 x 144.8 cm., private collection

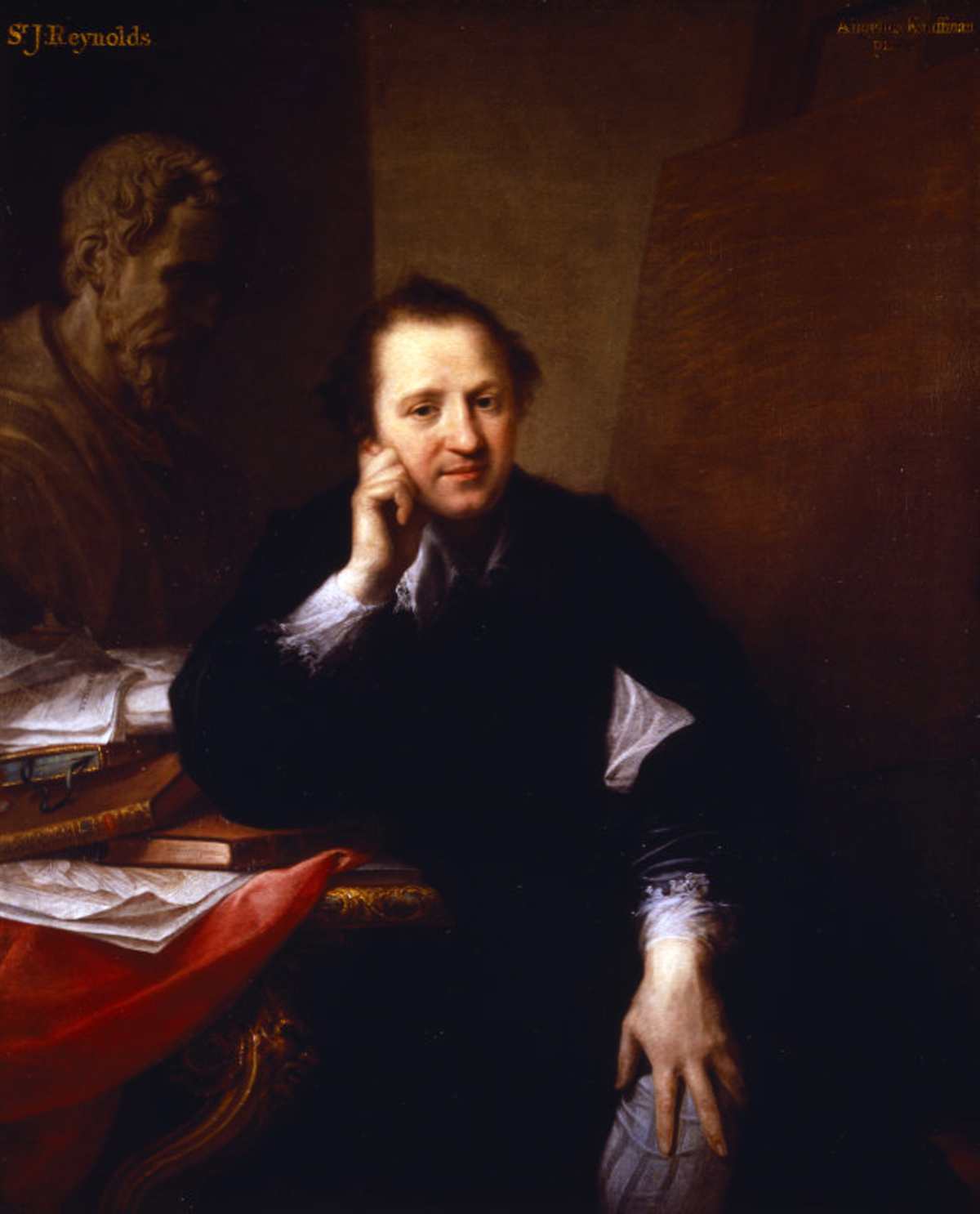
Sir Joshua Reynolds (1767), oil on canvas, 127 x 101.5 cm., National Trust, Saltram House

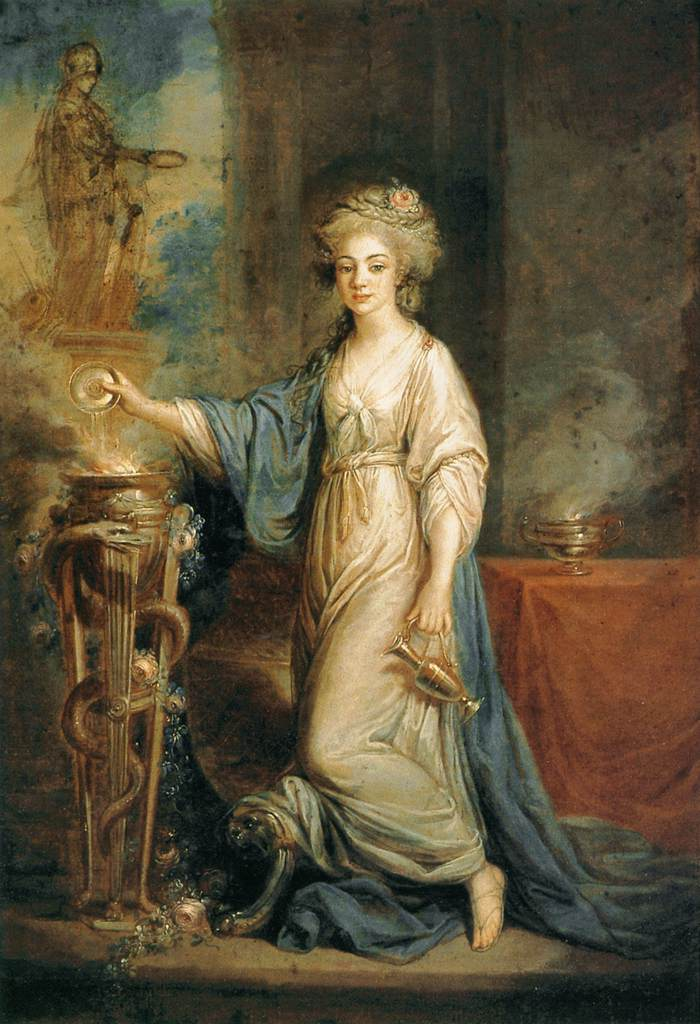
Portrait of a Woman as a Vestal Virgin (1770s), oil on canvas, 60 x 41 cm., Thyssen-Bornemisza Museum, Madrid

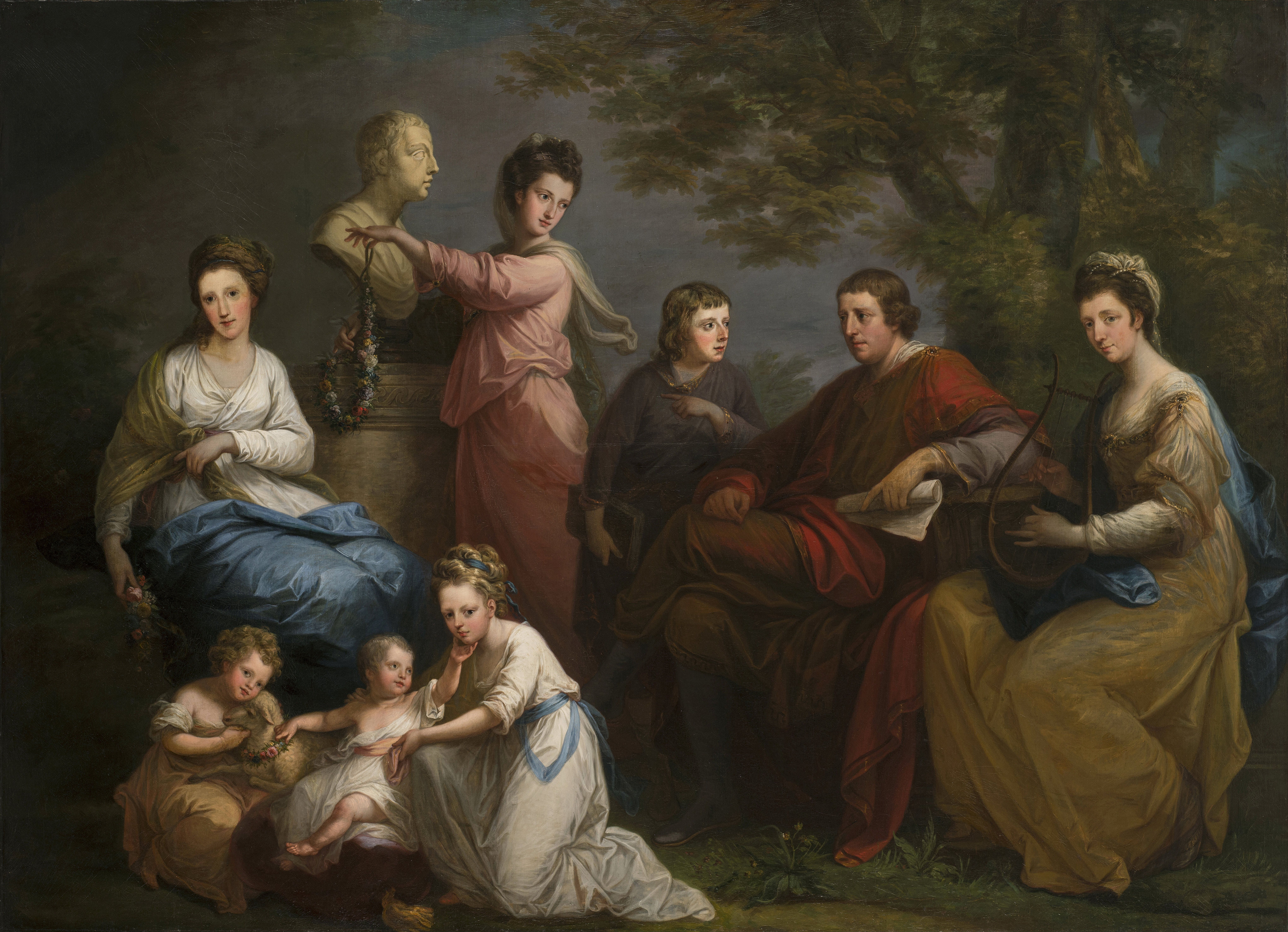
The Family of the Earl of Gower (1772), oil on canvas, 150.4 x 208.2 cm., National Museum of Women in the Arts, Washington, D.C.

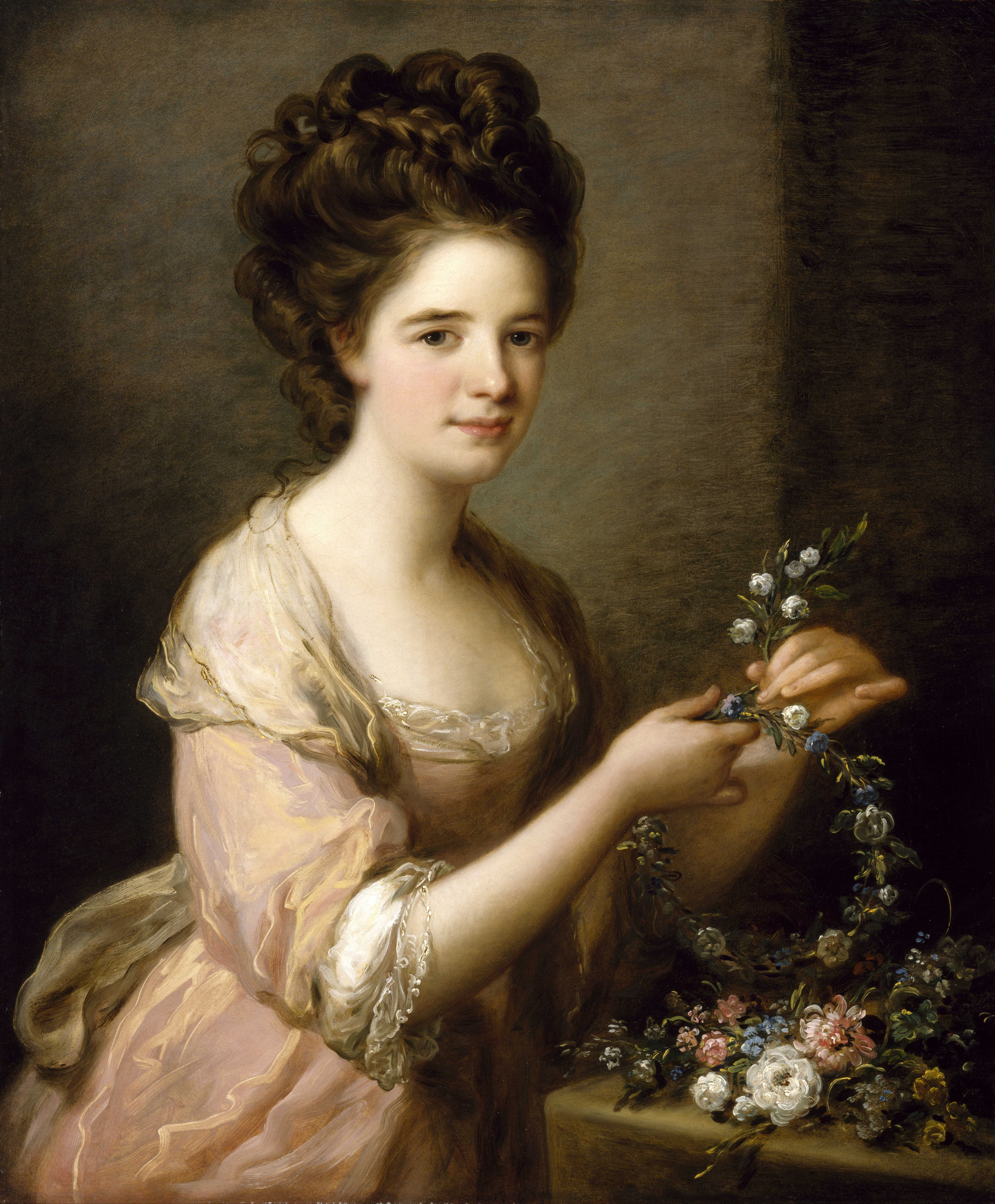
Portrait of Eleanor, Countess of Lauderdale (c. 1780), oil on canvas, 76.2 x 63.5 mm., Museum of Fine Arts, Houston

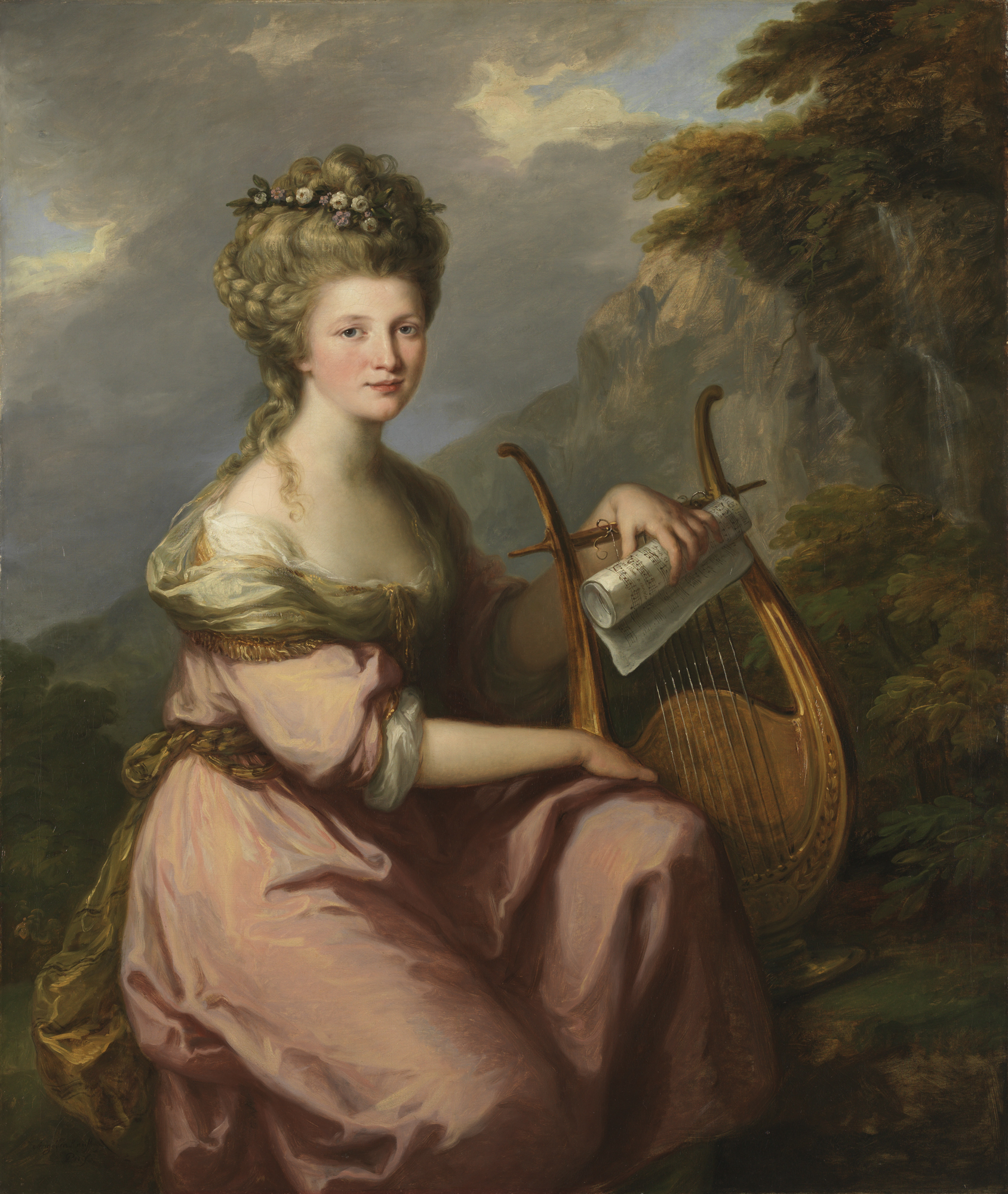
Portrait of Sarah Harrop (Mrs. Bates) as a Muse (1780–81), oil on canvas, 142 x 121 cm., Princeton University Art Museum, New Jersey

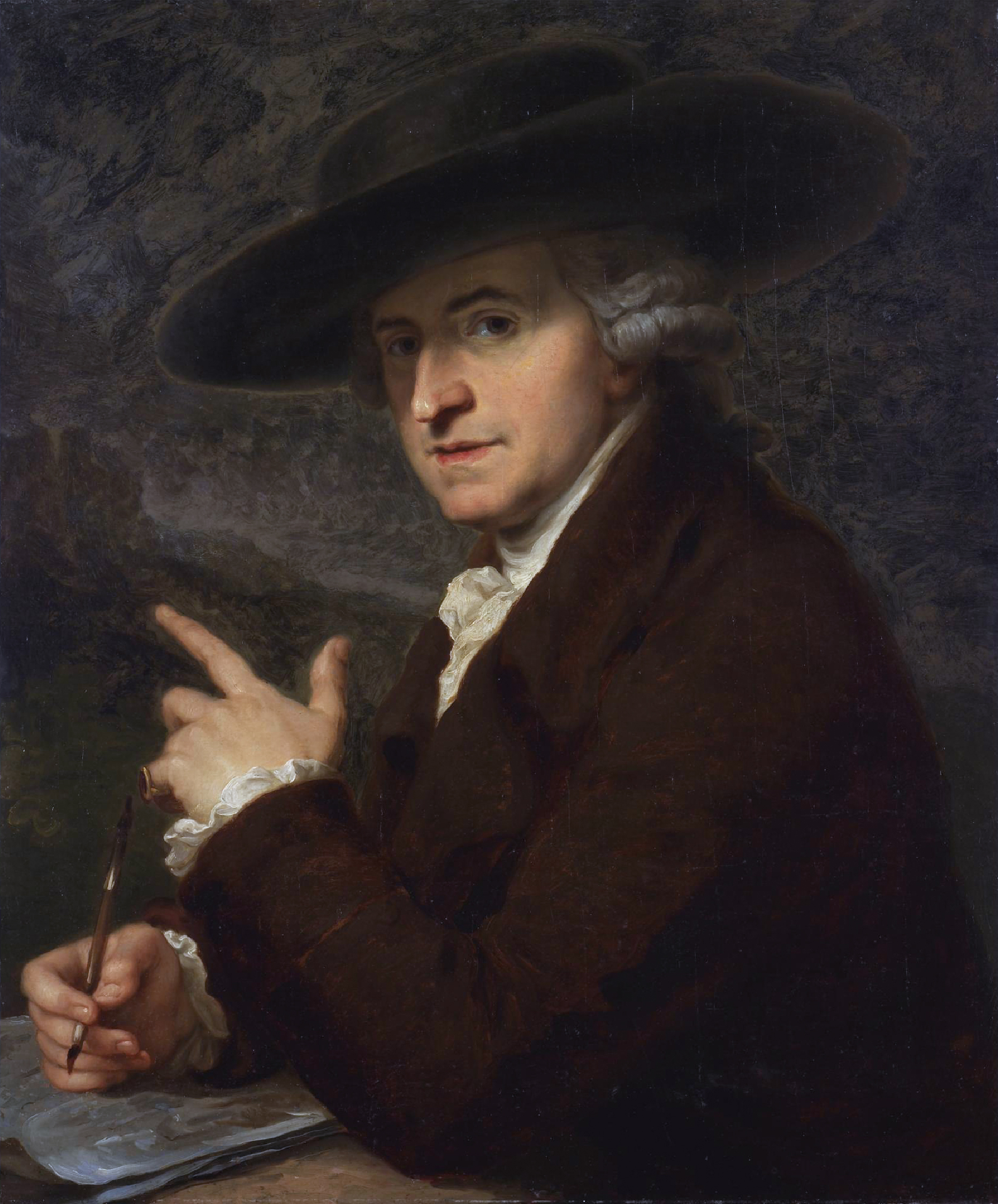
Antonio Zucchi [Kauffman's husband] (1781), oil on canvas, 76 x 63 cm., private collection

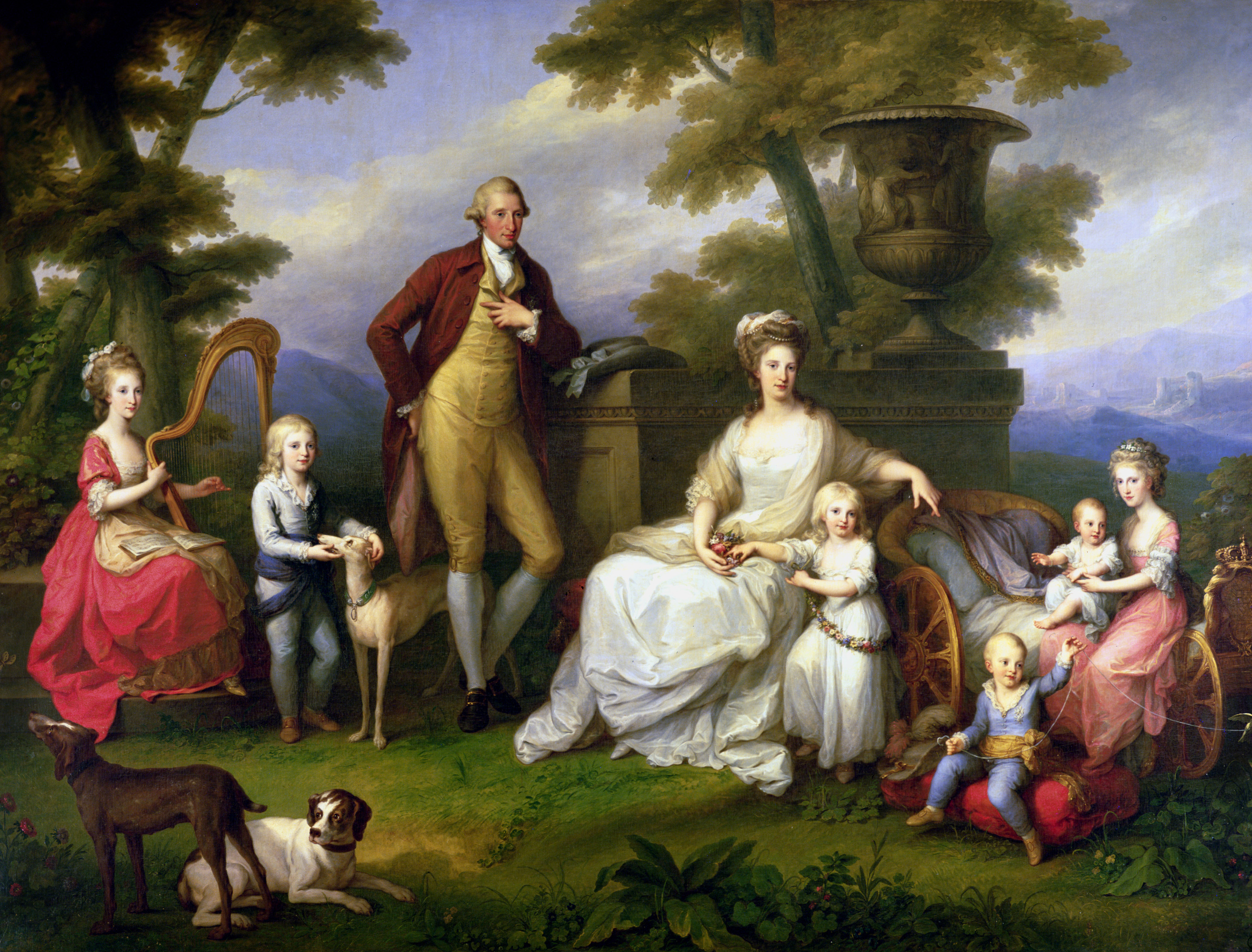
Portrait of Ferdinand IV of Naples, and his Family (1783), oil on canvas, 310 x 426 cm., Museo di Capodimonte, Naples

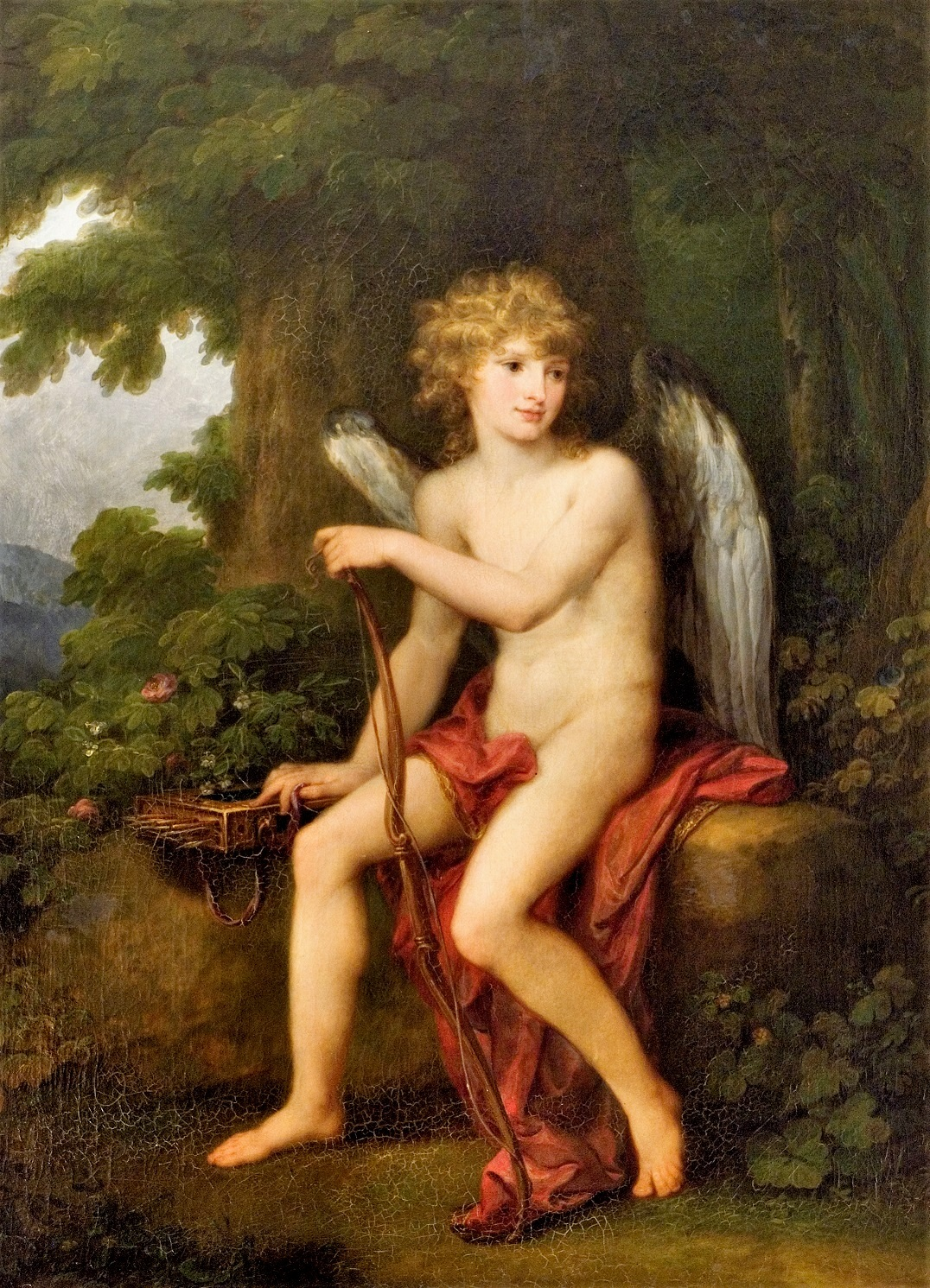
Prince Henry Lubomirski As Amor (1786), oil on canvas, Borys Voznytsky Lviv National Art Gallery, Ukraine

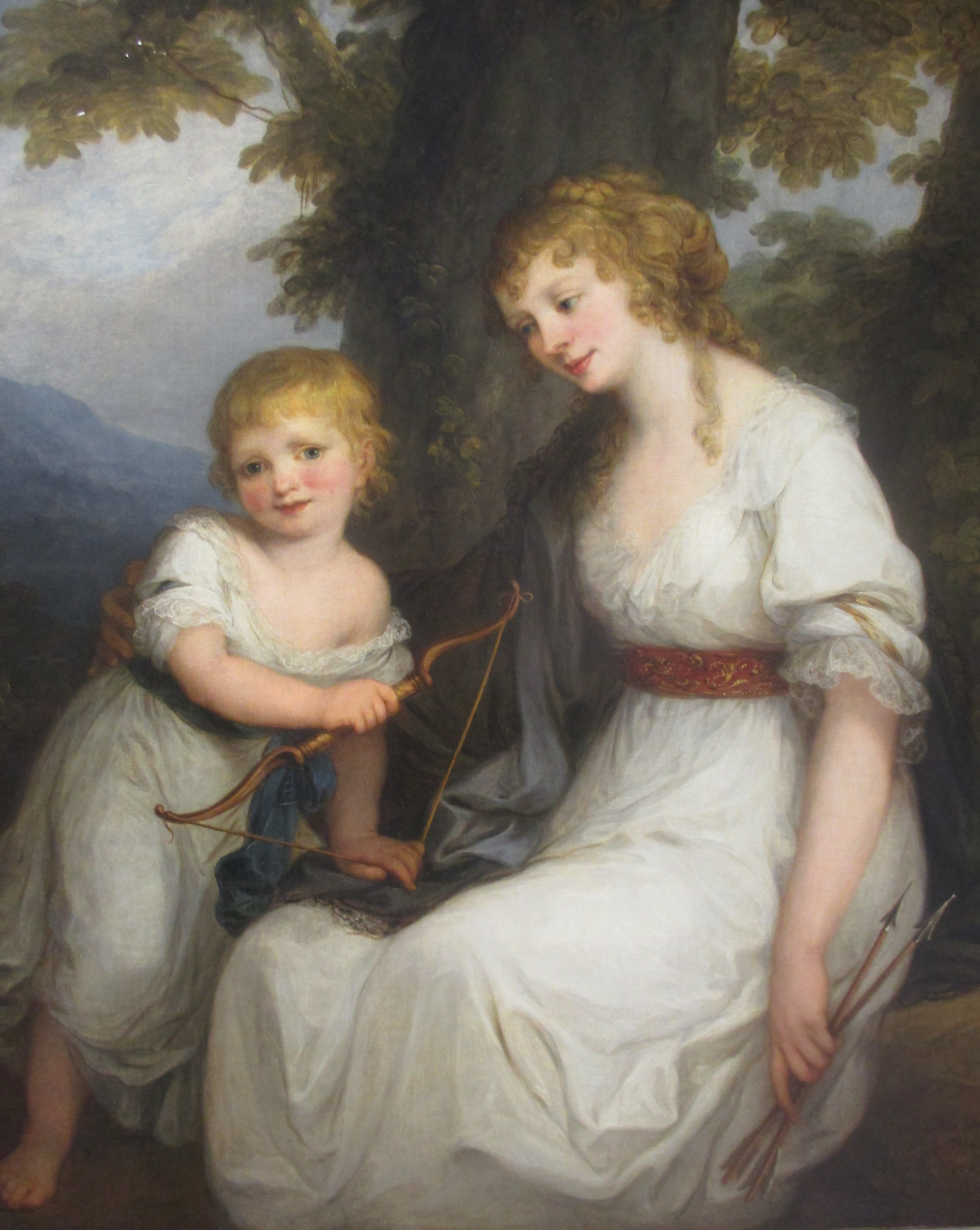
Baroness of Krüdener and Her Son Paul (1787), oil on canvas, 130 x 104.5 cm. , Musée du Louvre-Lens

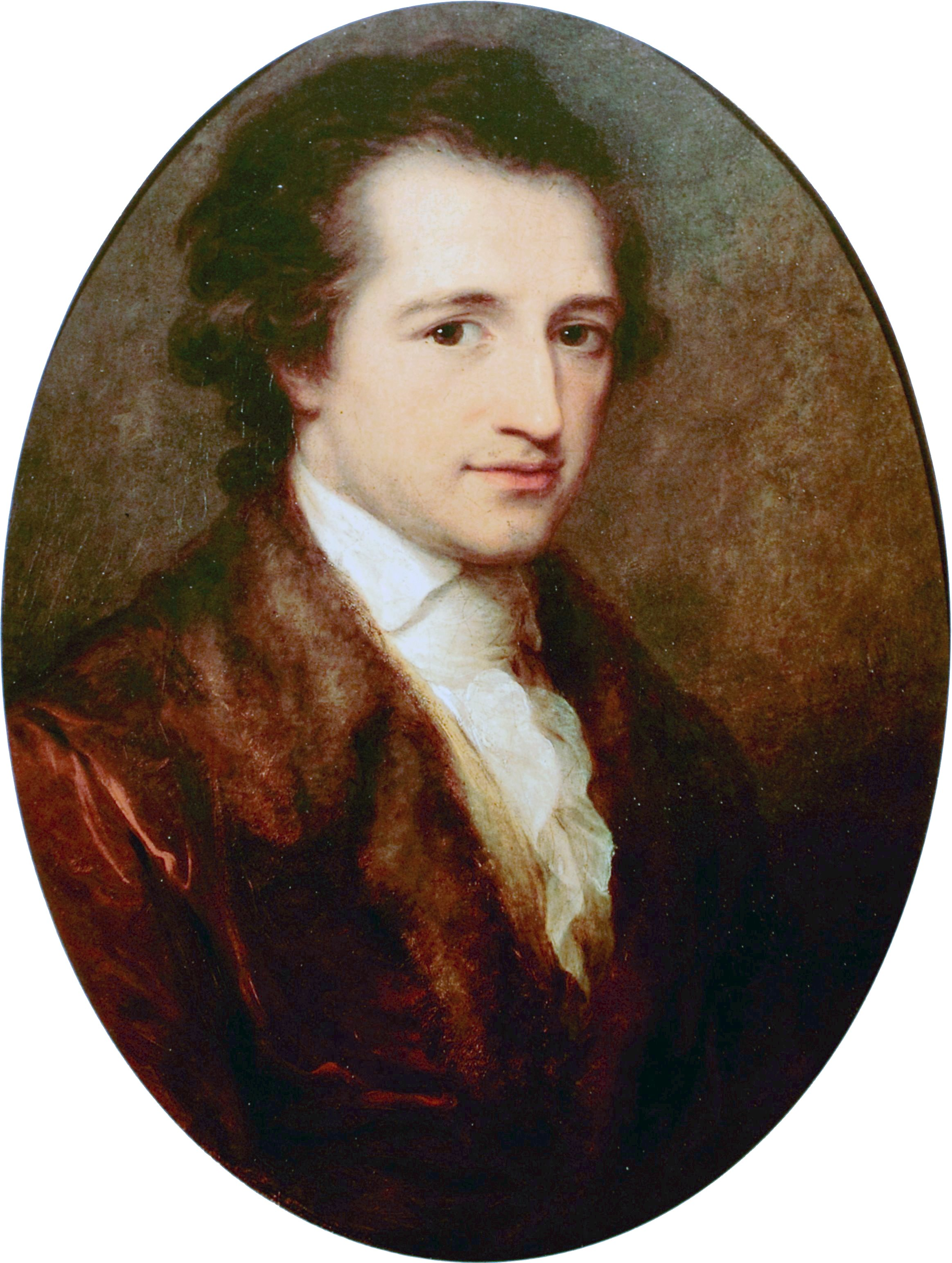
Goethe [at 38 years] (1787), oil on canvas, 64 x 52 cm., Goethe-Nationalmuseum, Weimar

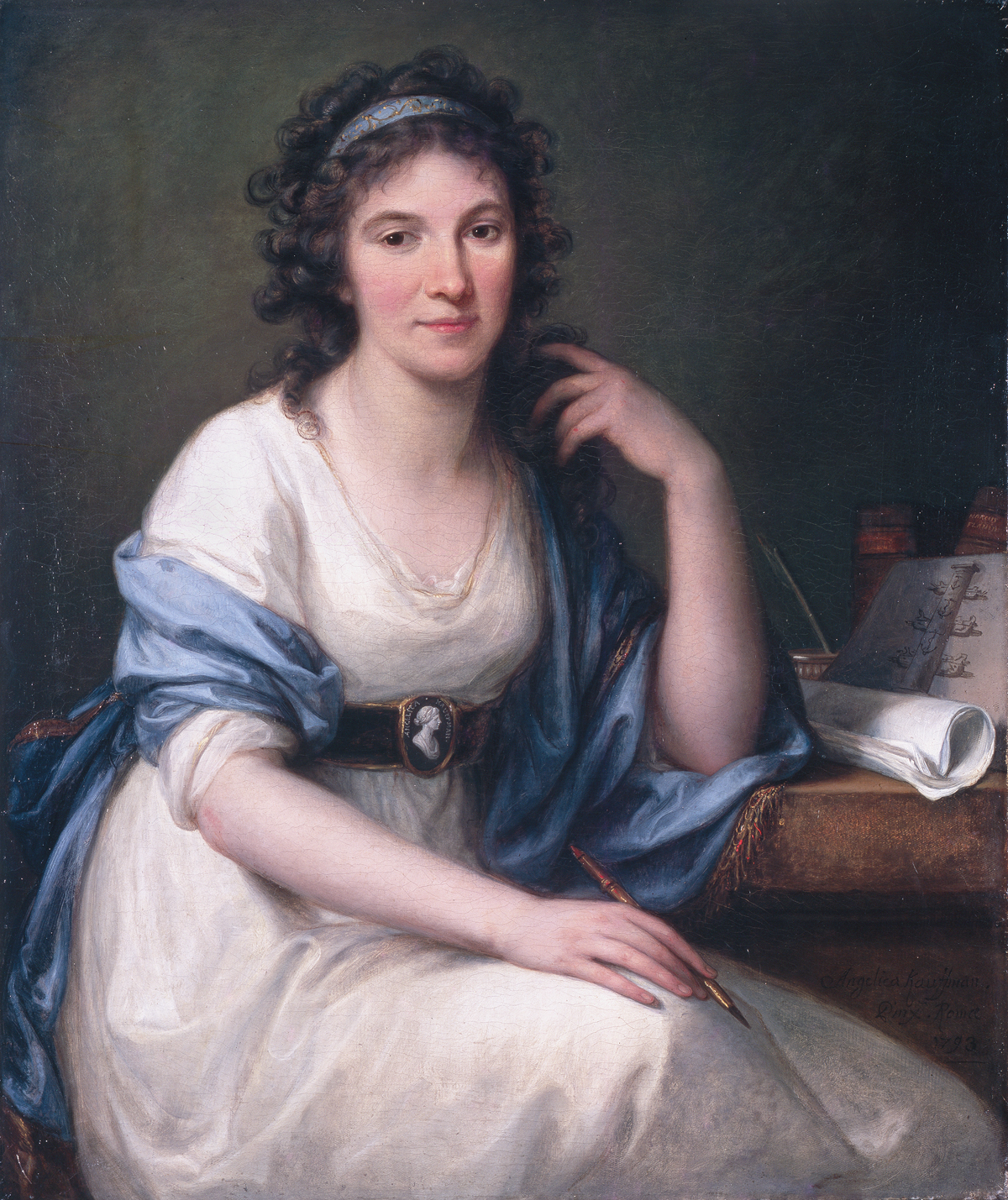
Ellis Cornelia Knight (1793), oil on canvas, 96 x 80 cm., Manchester Art Gallery

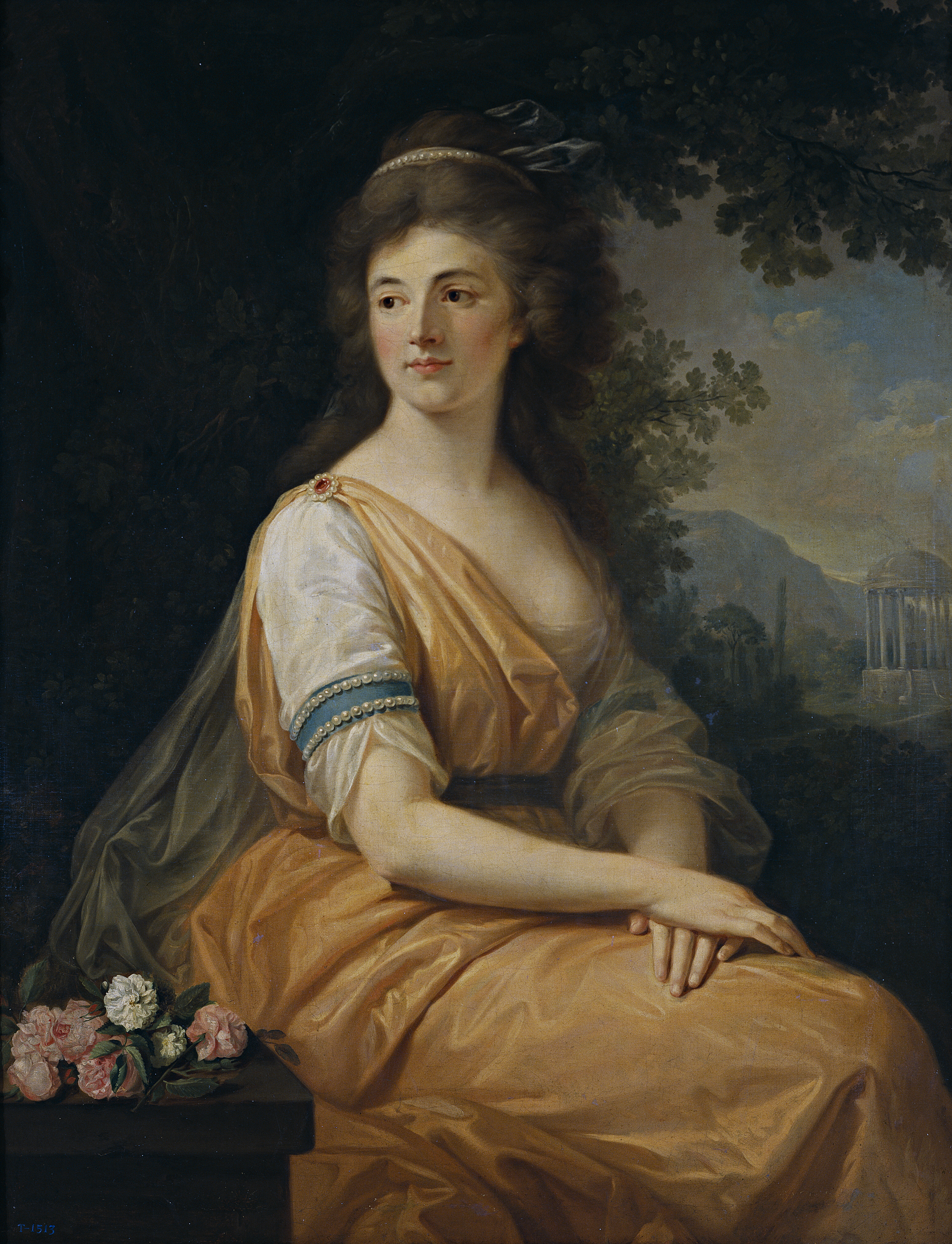
Anna von Escher van Muralt (c. 1800), oil on canvas, 110 x 86 cm., Museo del Prado, Madrid

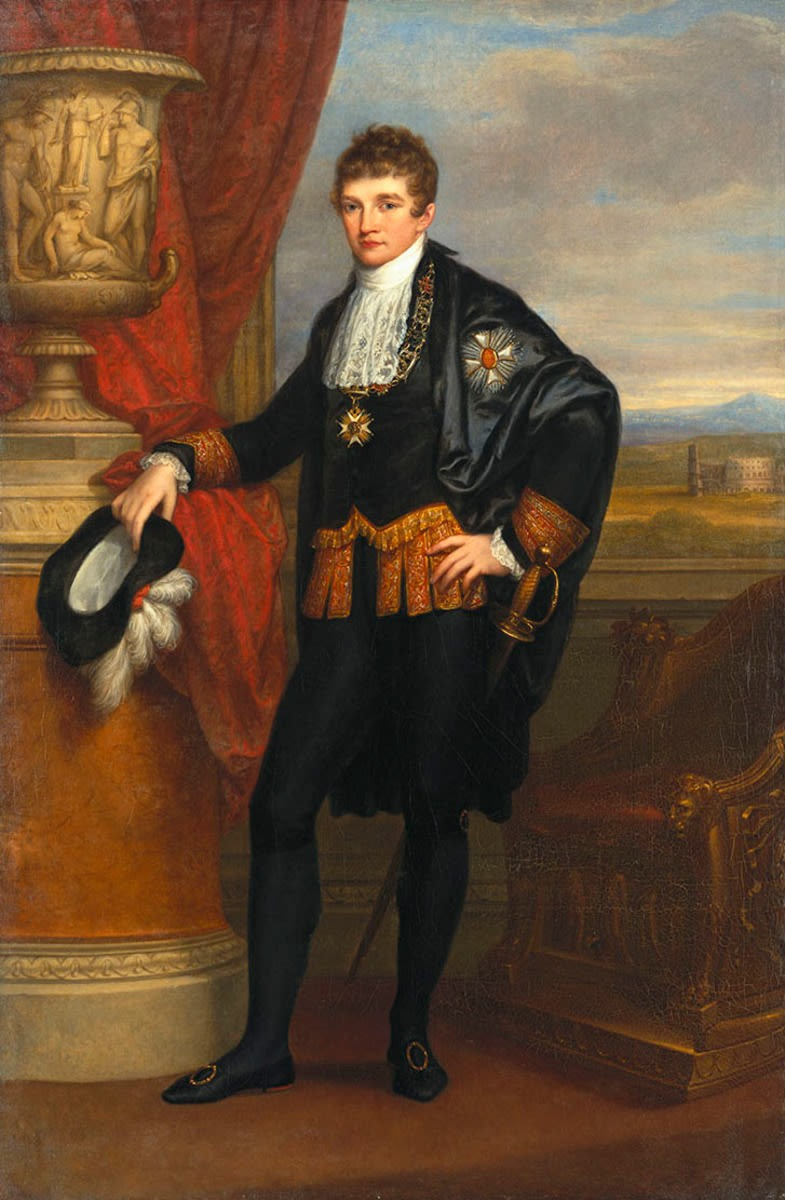
Portrait of Ludwig, Crown Prince of Bavaria (1807), oil on canvas, 224.6 x 146.8 cm., Neue Pinakothek, Munich

=== Miscellaneous ===
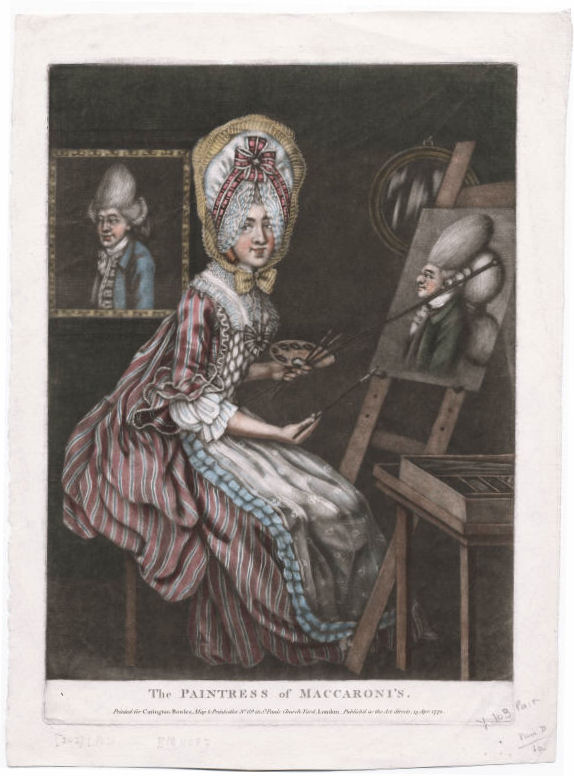
The Paintress of Macaroni's, believed to be a satire of Kauffman. London: Printed for Carington Bowles, 13 April 1772.

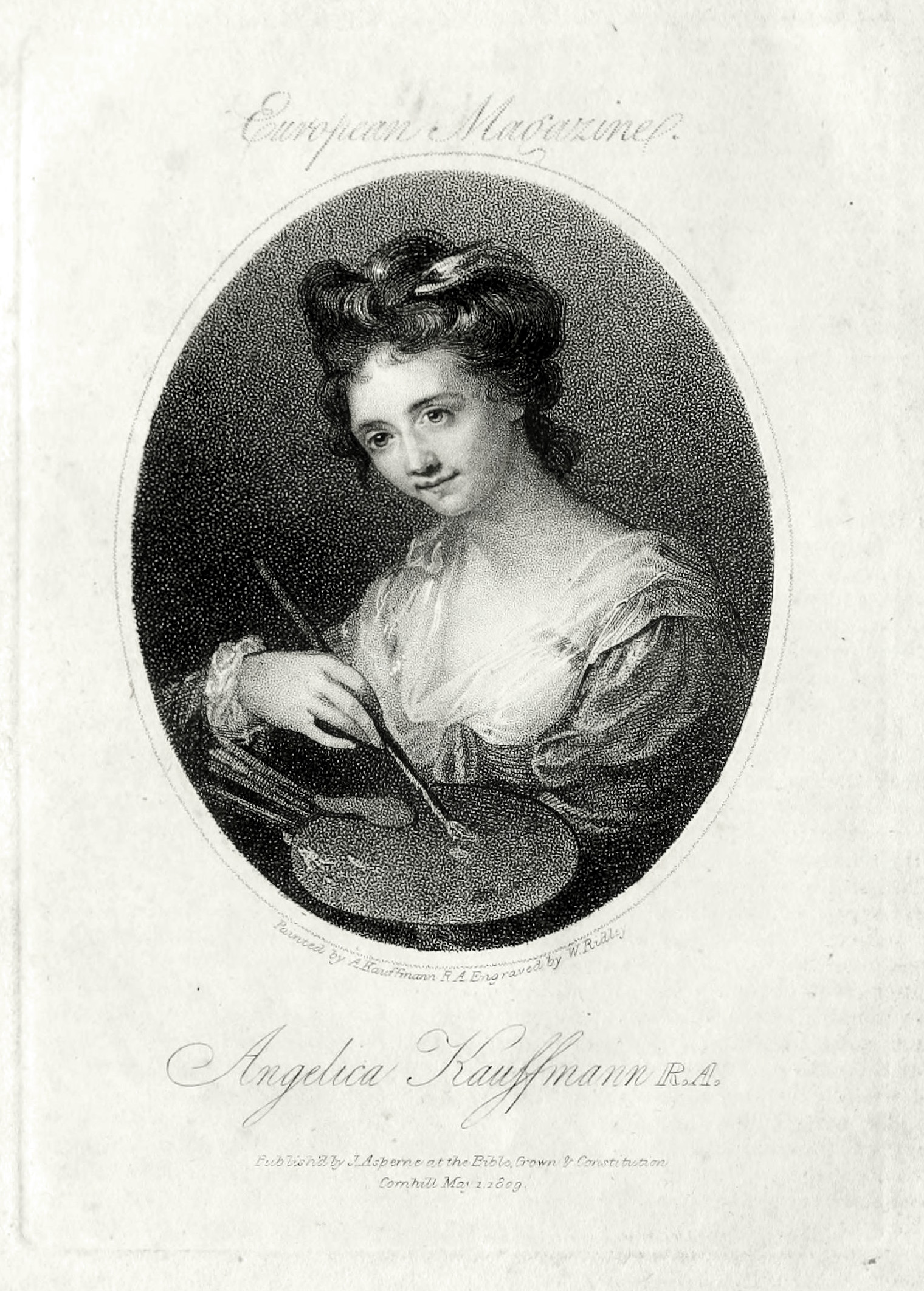
From The European Magazine and London Review

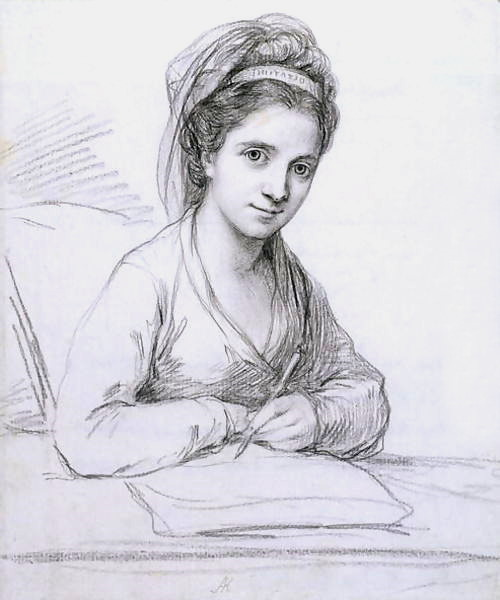
Self-Portrait as Imitatio (1771), pencil

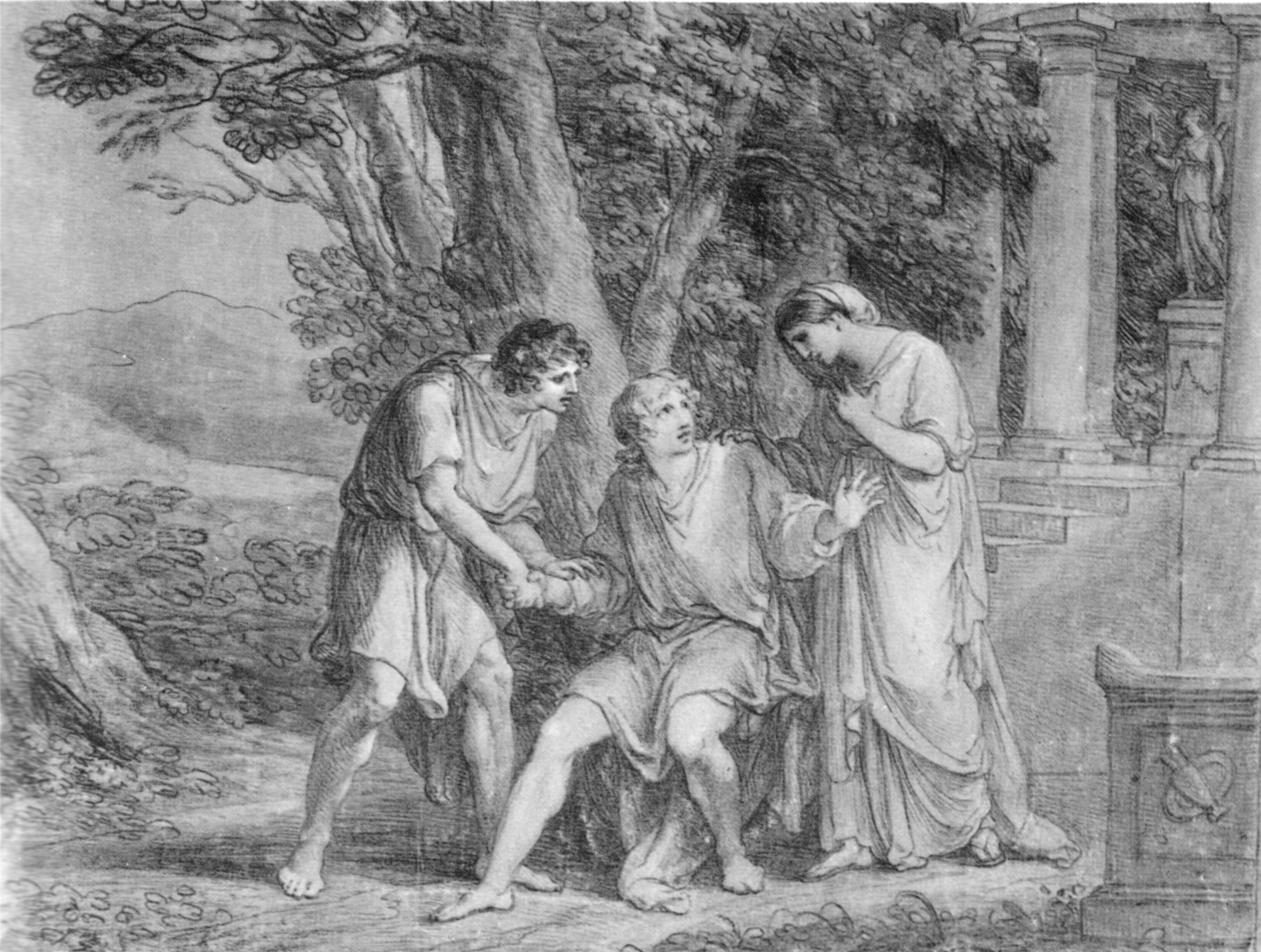
Scene from the 1802 première in Weimar of Goethe's Iphigenia in Tauris, with Goethe himself as Orestes in the centre.

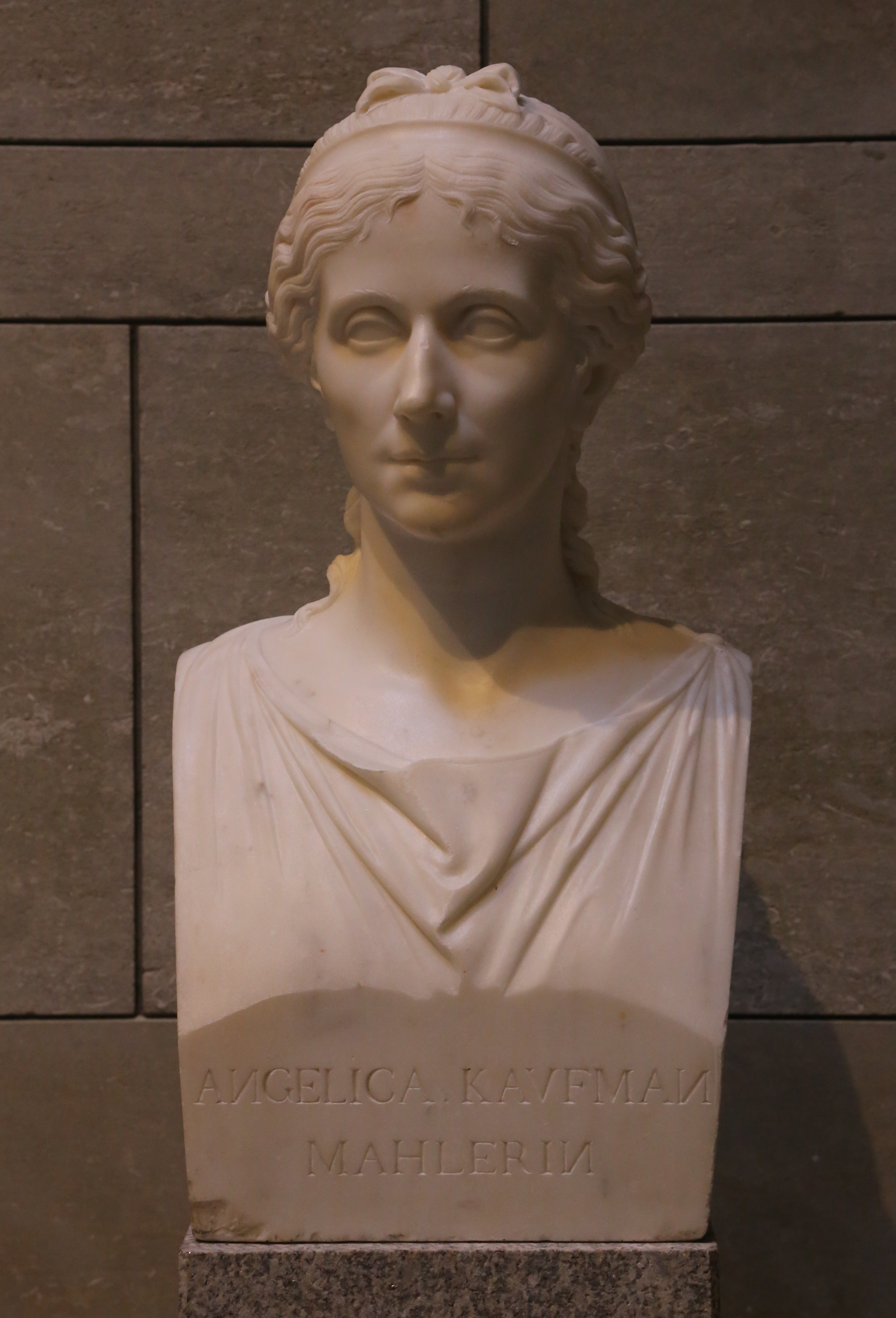
The Painter Angelika Kauffmann (1808), by Johann Peter Kauffmann, marble, 66,9 x 35,2 x 35 cm., Neue Pinakothek, Munich

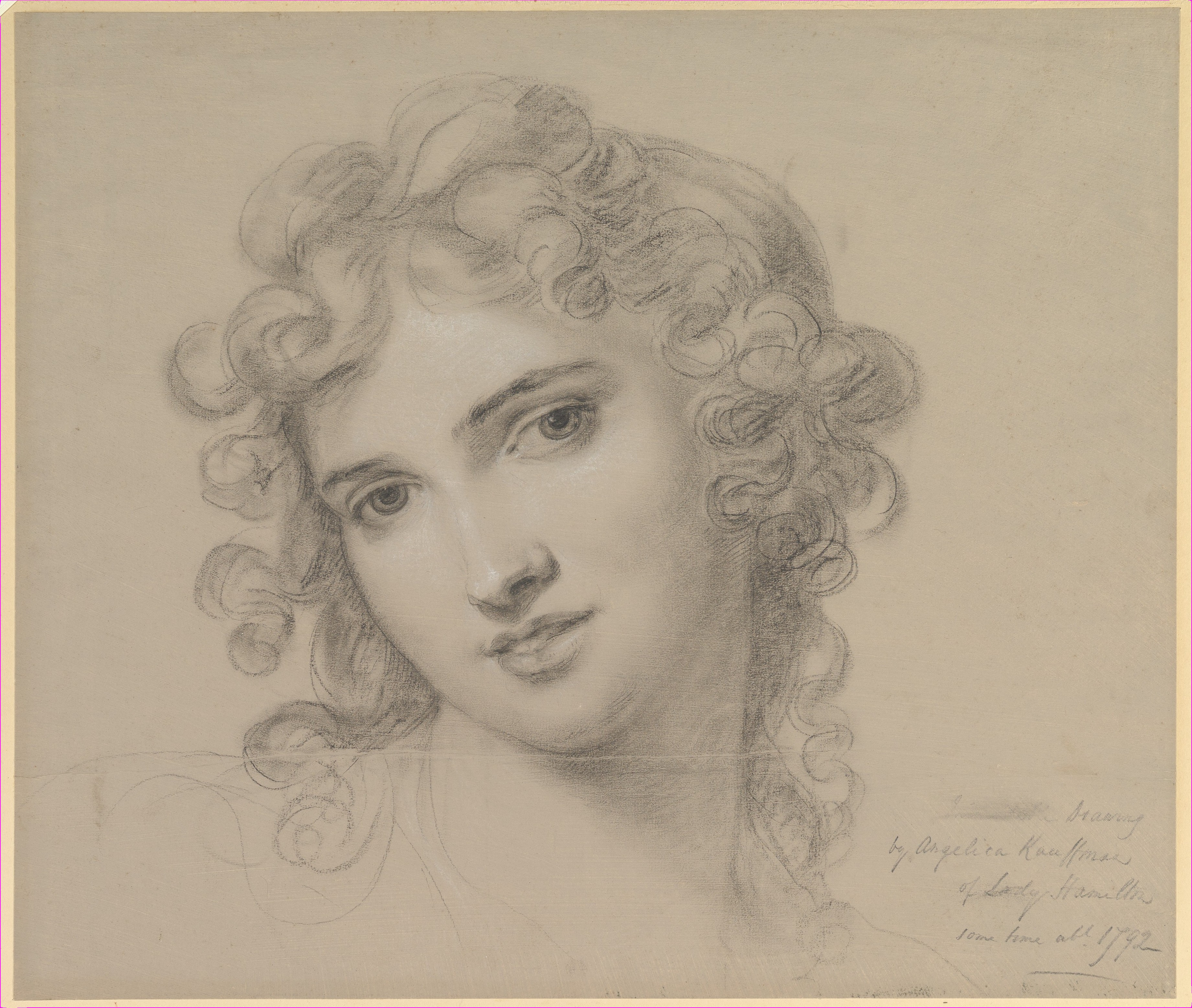
Portrait of Emma Hamilton (1791), Metropolitan Museum of Art, New York

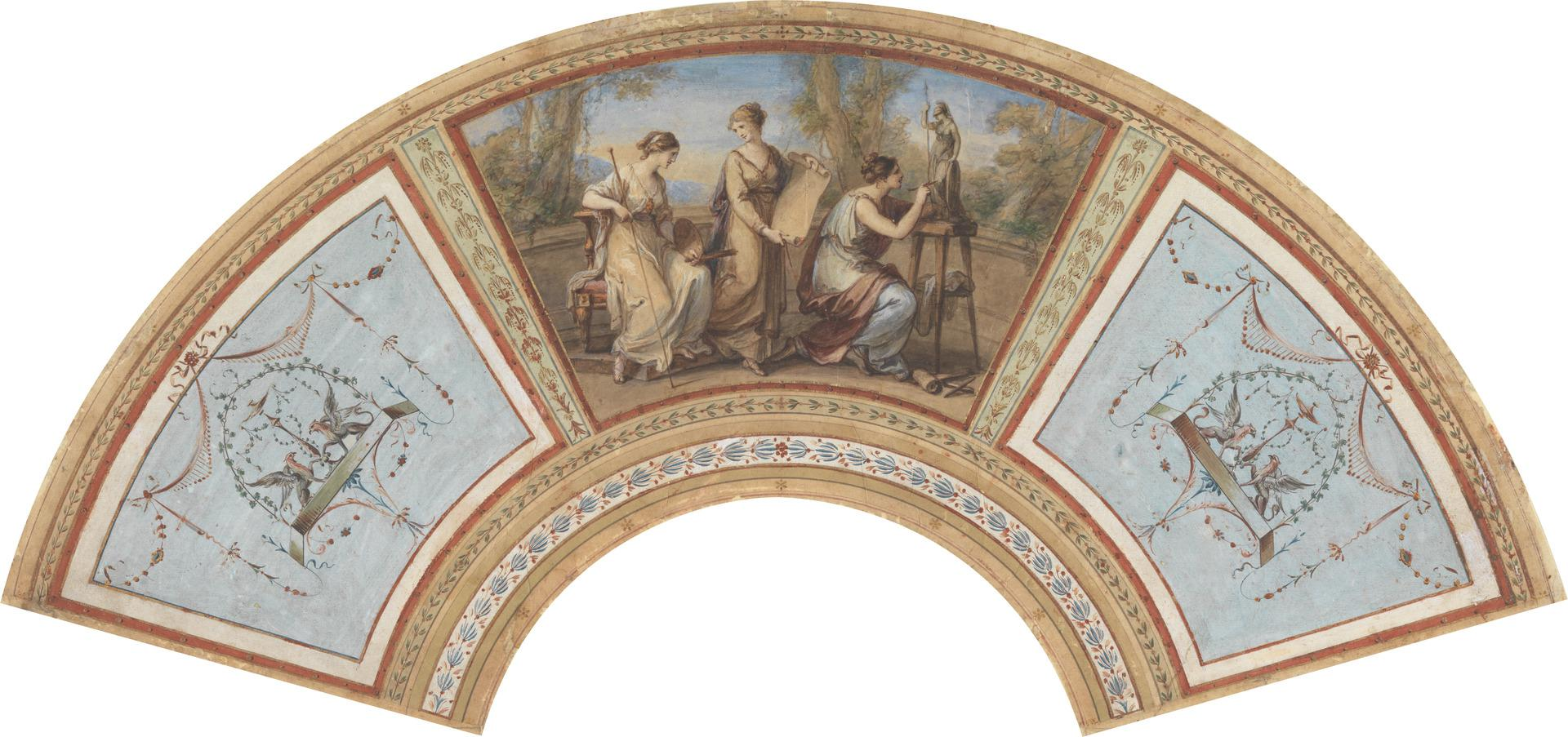
Design for a Fan (1775), Yale Center for British Art

== Exhibitions ==
- Retrospektive Angelika Kauffmann (270 works, c. 450 ill. ), Düsseldorf, Kunstmuseum (15 November 1998 – 24 January 1999); München, Haus der Kunst (5 February – 18 April 1999); Chur, Bündner Kunstmuseum (8 May – 11 July 1999).
- Angelica Kauffman: Unknown Treasures from Vorarlberg Private Collections, concurrent exhibitions at the Vorarlberg Museum (15 June – 6 October 2019) and the Angelika Kauffmann Museum, Schwarzenberg, Austria (16 June – 3 November 2019).
- Angelica Kauffman, Royal Academy, London, 1 March – 30 June 2024
