= 1764 in art =

Events from the year 1764 in art.

== Events ==
- February - Joshua Reynolds co-founds The Club with writer Samuel Johnson.
- Johann Joachim Winckelmann's Geschichte der Kunst des Alterthums ("History of Ancient Art") is published.

== Paintings ==
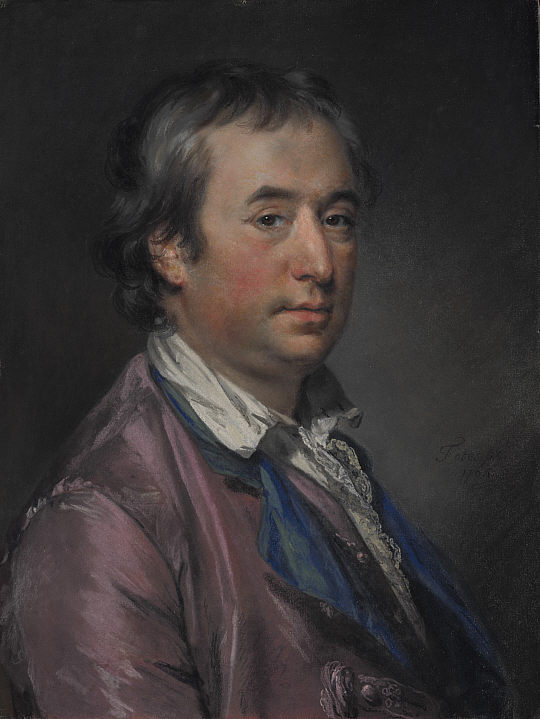
Francis Cotes – Portrait of the architect William Chambers (1764)

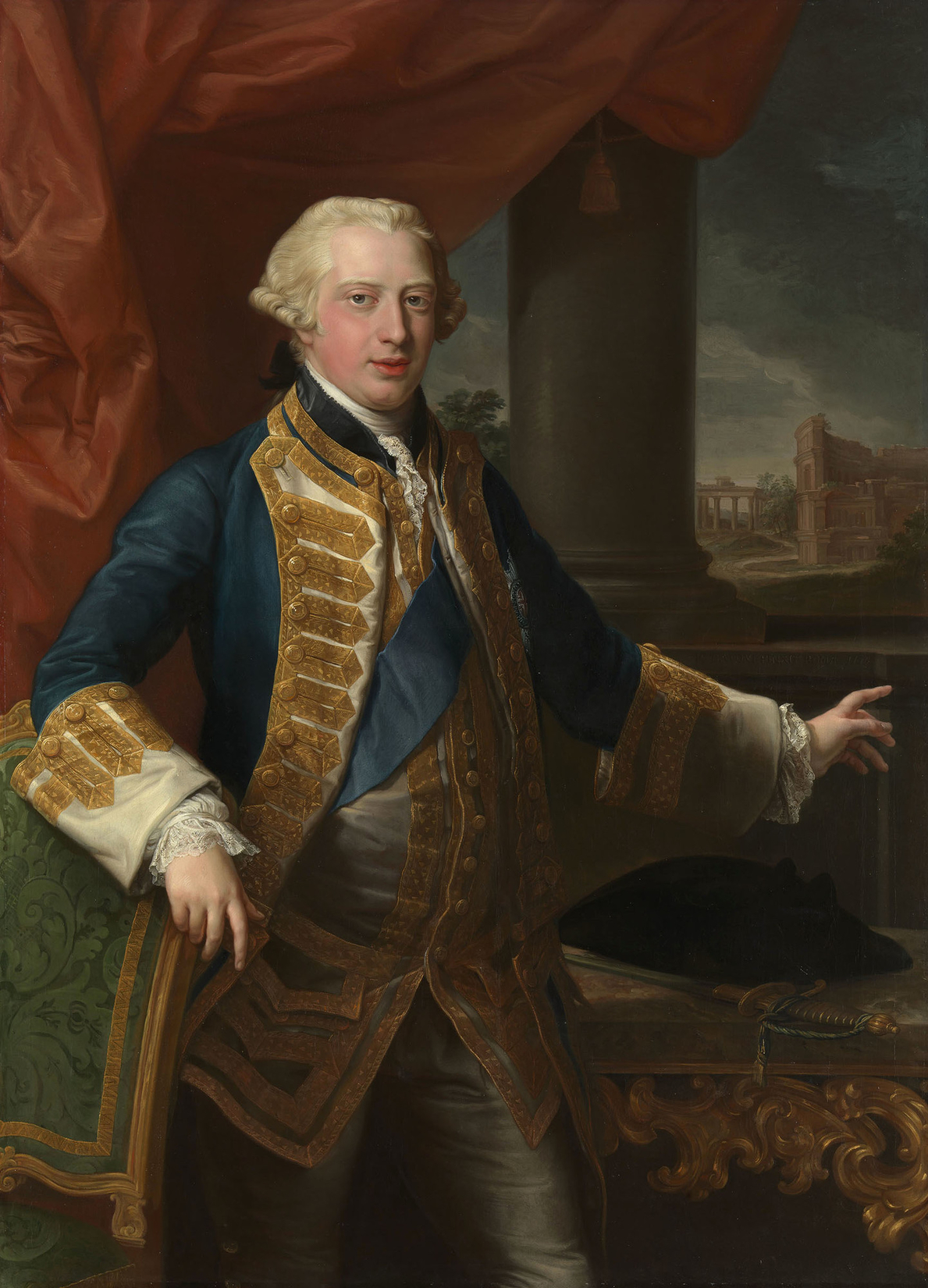
Portrait of the Duke of York by Pompeo Batoni

- Pompeo Batoni
  - Portrait of David Garrick
  - Portrait of the Duke of York
- Nicola Bertucci and Carlo Lodi – The Pleasures of Country Life (tempera paintings for Villa Sampiera, Bologna)
- Nathaniel Dance-Holland – Portrait of Angelica Kauffman
- Vigilius Eriksen – Catherine II Before the Mirror
- Thomas Gainsborough
  - Portrait of Countess Howe
  - Portrait of Robert Clive
- Angelica Kauffman
  - Penelope at Her Loom
  - Portrait of David Garrick
- Edward Penny – The Marquis of Granby Relieving a Sick Soldier
- Joshua Reynolds – The Brown Boy
- Charles-Amédée-Philippe van Loo – The Magic Lantern
- Johann Zoffany – The Three Sons of the Earl of Bute

== Births ==
- April 1 - Barbara Krafft, Austrian portrait painter (died 1825)
- April 13 – Giacomo Guardi, Italian veduta painter (died 1835)
- April 14 – Firmin Didot, French printer, engraver, and type founder (died 1836)
- April 20 – Rudolph Ackermann, Saxon-born printer and lithographer (died 1834)
- April 30 – Luigi Ademollo, Italian painter (died 1849)
- May 11 – Grigory Ugryumov, Russian painter (died 1823)
- May 20 – Johann Gottfried Schadow, German sculptor (died 1850)
- July 9 – Louis-Pierre Baltard, architect and engraver (died 1846)
- July 12 – Charles Thévenin, neoclassical French painter, known for heroic scenes (died 1838)
- August 22 – Charles Percier, French architect and designer (died 1838)
- September 18 – Mauro Gandolfi, Italian painter and engraver of the Bolognese School (died 1834)
- October 14 – Ferdinand Runk, German-Austrian landscape painter, draftsman and etcher (died 1834)
- October 19 - Johann Christoph Rincklake, German portrait painter (died 1813)
- Unknown
  - Jacques-Louis Copia, French engraver (died 1799)
  - Giovanni Folo, Italian engraver of the Neoclassic period (died 1836)
- Probable
  - Qian Du, Chinese landscape painter during the Qing Dynasty (died 1844)

== Deaths ==
- March 13 – Okumura Masanobu, Japanese print designer, book publisher, and painter (born 1686)
- April 9 – Marco Benefial, Italian, proto-Neoclassical painter, mainly active in Rome (born 1684)
- May 3 – Francesco Algarotti, Italian philosopher, engraver and art critic (born 1712)
- July 20 – Peter van Bleeck, portrait painter and engraver (born 1697)
- August 23 – Johanna Marie Fosie, Danish painter and first professional native female artist in Denmark (born 1726)
- September 1 – Sebastiano Conca, Italian painter (born 1680)
- October 26 – William Hogarth, English painter credited with pioneering western sequential art (born 1697)
- November 13 – John Wootton, English painter of sporting subjects, battle scenes and landscapes (born 1682)
- Undated – Francesco Zucchi, Italian engraver (born 1692)
