= Portrait of Angelica Kauffman =

Portrait of Angelica Kauffman may refer to:

- Portrait of Angelica Kauffman (Reynolds)
- Portrait of Angelica Kauffman (Dance-Holland)
