= Portrait of the Duke of York =

Portrait of the Duke of York may refer to:

- Portrait of Prince Edward, Duke of York (1764) by Pompeo Batoni
- Portrait of Prince Frederick, Duke of York (1816) by Thomas Lawrence
- Portrait of Frederick, Duke of York (1823) by Pompeo Batoni
