= List of painters by name beginning with "Q" =

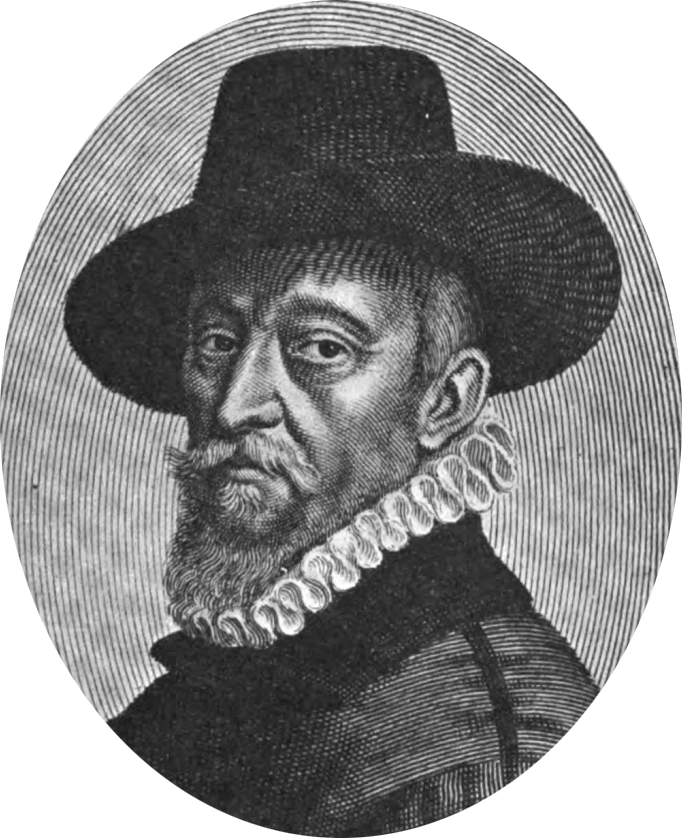
François Quesnel

Please add names of notable painters with a Wikipedia page, in precise English alphabetical order, using U.S. spelling conventions. Country and regional names refer to where painters worked for long periods, not to personal allegiances.

- Qi Baishi (齊白石, 1864–1957), Chinese painter and seal carver
- Qian Du (錢杜, 1764–1844), Chinese painter
- Qian Gu (錢谷, 1508 – c. 1578), Chinese painter
- Qian Xuan (錢選, 1235–1305), Chinese painter
- Qiu Ying (仇英, 1494–1552), Chinese gongbi painter
- Qu Leilei (曲磊磊, born 1951), Chinese/English calligrapher, painter and author
- Domenico Quaglio the Younger (1787–1837), German painter, engraver and architect
- Arthur Quartley (1839–1886), American painter
- Enguerrand Quarton (c. 1410 – c. 1466), French painter and manuscript illuminator
- Pieter Jansz Quast (1606–1647), Dutch painter and draftsman
- Harvey Quaytman (1937–2002), American painter
- August Querfurt (1696–1761), Austrian painter
- José Comas Quesada (1928–1993), Canary Islands painter
- François Quesnel (c. 1543 – 1619), French painter
- Annie Abernethie Pirie Quibell (1862–1927), Scottish artist and archaeologist
- John Quidor (1801–1881), American painter
- Benito Quinquela Martín (1890–1977), Argentine painter
- Quirizio di Giovanni da Murano (fl. c. 1460–1478), Italian painter
