= Portrait of Robert Clive (Gainsborough) =

Painting by Thomas Gainsborough

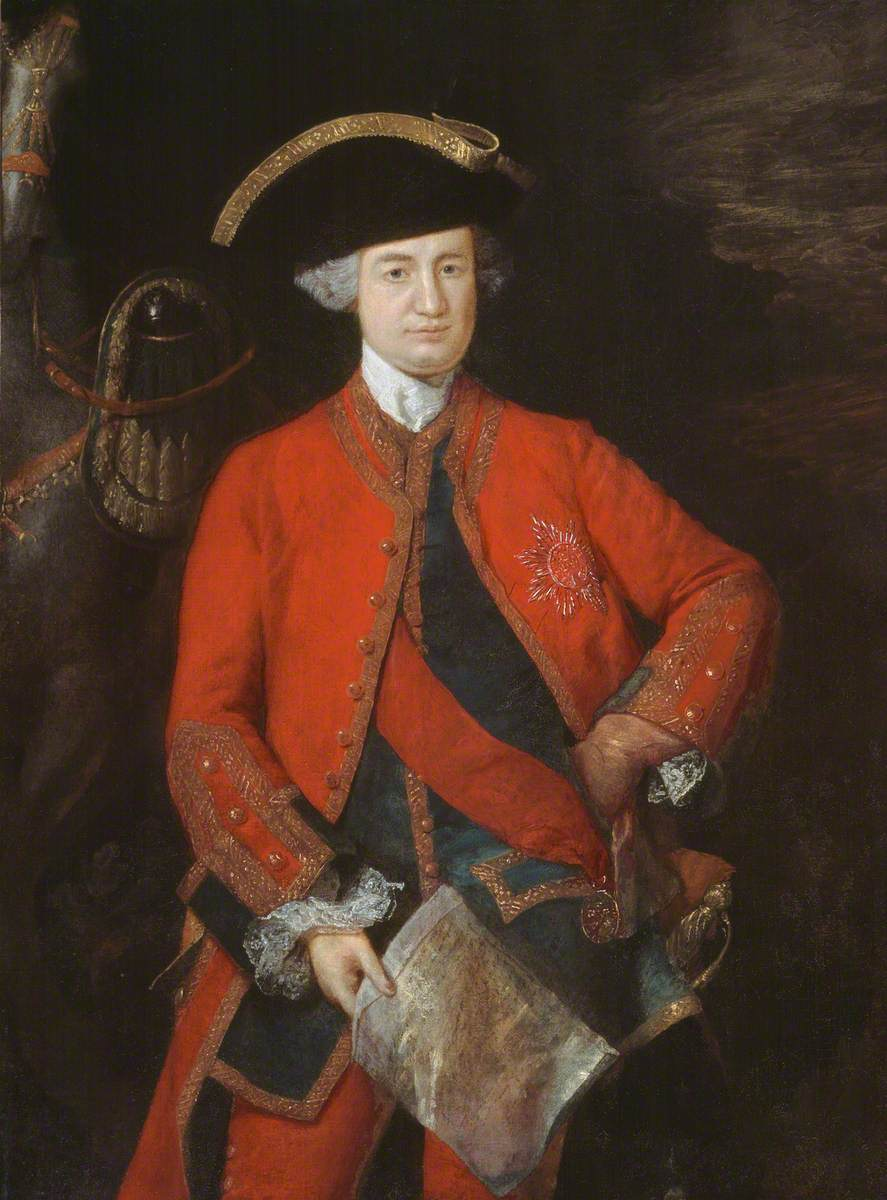
- Artist: Thomas Gainsborough
- Year: c.1764
- Type: Oil on canvas, portrait painting
- Dimensions: 137.5 cm × 101.6 cm (54.1 in × 40.0 in)
- Location: National Army Museum; London

Portrait of Robert Clive is a c.1764 portrait painting by the British artist Thomas Gainsborough. It depicts the British general Robert Clive. Known for his victories, notably at the Battle of Plassey in 1757 and the expansion of the power of the East India Company. Clive likely sat for the portrait in Bath during his return to England. It was painted just before he left for India for the third and final time in April 1765. Around the same time Clive as also painted by his cousin Charles.

Gainsborough had relocated from Ipswich to the fashionable spa town of Bath in 1759. He was one of the founding members of the Royal Academy and a major figure in the British art world of the Georgian era. Today the painting is in the collection of the National Army Museum in Chelsea having been gifted by the Earl of Powis, a descendant of Clive, in 1963. The sitter later posed for another noted Portrait of Robert Clive by the Neoclassical artist Nathaniel Dance-Holland.

== Bibliography ==
- Jasanoff, Maya. Edge of Empire: Conquest and Collecting in the East, 1750-1850. Fourth Estate, 2005.
- Pickford, Nigel & Hatcher, Michael. The Legacy of the Tek Sing: China's Titanic. Granta Editions, 2000.
