= Giovanni Battista Tempesti =

Italian painter

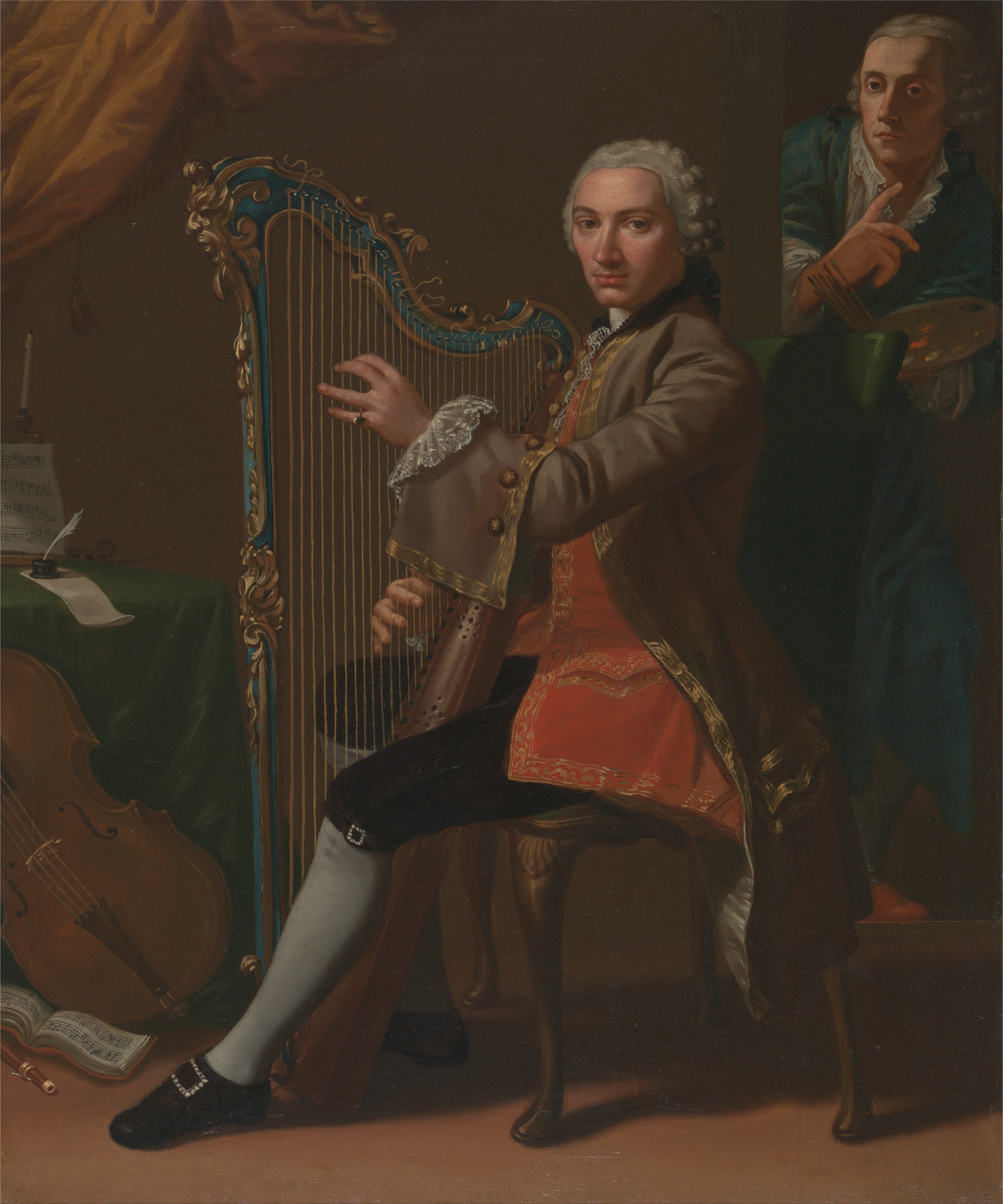
Cristiano Giuseppe Lidarti and Giovanni Battista Tempesti by Nathaniel Dance-Holland, 1759–1760.

Giovanni Battista Tempesti (1729–1804) was an Italian painter, active mainly in Pisa.

== Biography ==
Tempesta was born in Volterra. He studied in Pisa and Rome. On his return from to Pisa, for the church of San Domenico, he painted scenes from the life of Santa Chiara Gambacorti, and for the cathedral the Celebration of Mass by Pope Eugenius III. He painted the music-hall in the Pitti Palace for Leopold I, as well as several frescoes in palaces and villas in Pisa. Among his works is a fresco of the Last Supper for the cathedral of Pisa, frescoes for the Archbishop's hall, a Glory of the Blessed Ranieri and a Martyrdom of Santa Ursula for the Oratory of San Vito in Pisa. The frescoes for the church of San Vito were destroyed during bombardments during World War II. He also painted frescoes for the Palazzo Lanfreducci in Pisa. He died in Pisa.
