= Portrait of Arthur Murphy =

Painting by Nathaniel Dance-Holland

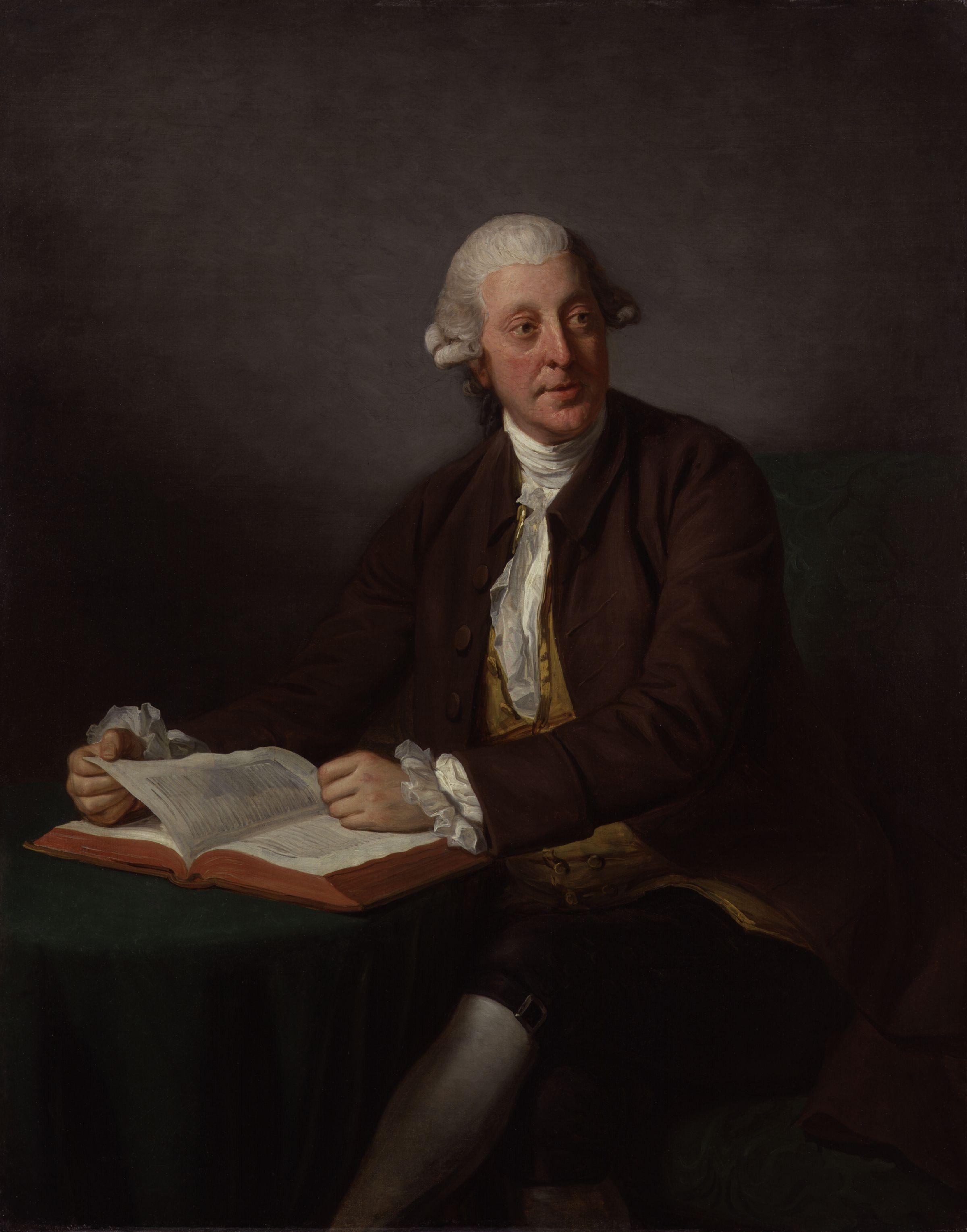
- Artist: Nathaniel Dance-Holland
- Year: c. 1777
- Type: Oil on canvas, portrait painting
- Dimensions: 127 cm × 101.6 cm (50 in × 40.0 in)
- Location: National Portrait Gallery; London

Portrait of Arthur Murphy is a c.1777 portrait painting by the English artist Nathaniel Dance-Holland or the Irish barrister and playwright Arthur Murphy. Dance-Holland was a leading portraitist of the era and a founder of the Royal Academy. Murphy was noted for a number of plays, a mixture of comediess and tragedies, performed in the West End.

At one time it was in the possession of Hester Maria Elphinstone, Viscountess Keith. It is now in the collection of the National Portrait Gallery in London, having been acquired in 1857. William Ward produced a mezzotint based on Dance-Holland's painting in 1805.

== Bibliography ==
- Cullen, Fintan. The Irish Face: Redefining the Irish Portrait. National Portrait Gallery, 2004
- Ingamells, John. National Portrait Gallery Mid-Georgian Portraits, 1760–1790. National Portrait Gallery, 2004.
- Palmer, Allison Lee. Historical Dictionary of Neoclassical Art and Architecture. Scarecrow Press, 2011.
- Yung, Kai Kai. Samuel Johnson, 1709-84. Herbert Press, 1984.
