= Margaret Clive =

British society figure (1735–1817)

The Right Honourable The Lady Clive
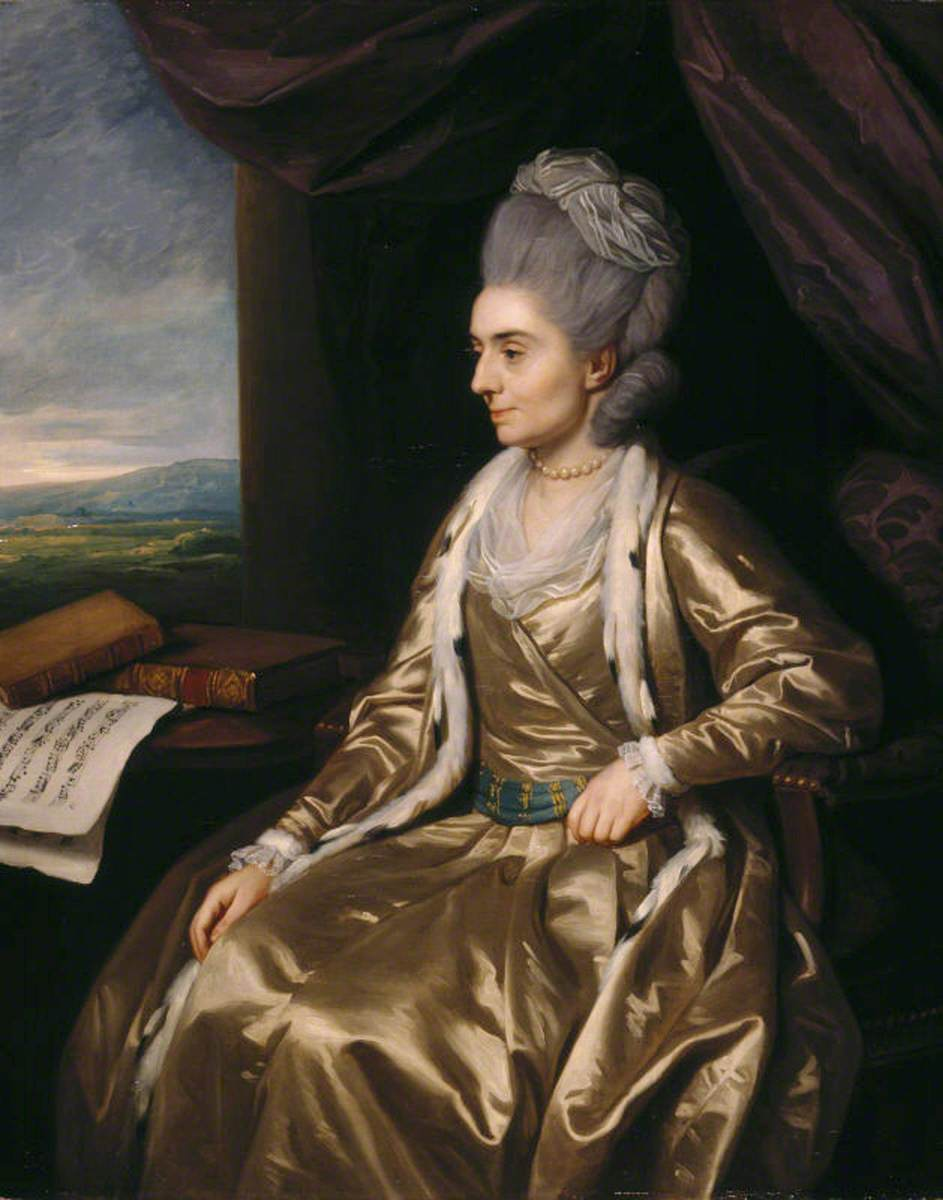
- Portrait by Nathaniel Dance-Holland, c.1770–74
- Born: 26 October 1735; Kensington Gore, London, England
- Died: 28 December 1817 (aged 82); Oakly Park, Shropshire, England
- Education: Mrs Saintsbury of Cirencester
- Occupation: Society hostess
- Spouse: Robert Clive (m. 1753; died 1774)
- Children: 9, including Edward

Margaret Clive, Baroness Clive (née Maskelyne; 26 October 1735 – 28 December 1817) was a British society figure. She went out to India to meet an admirer and married a military hero. She was in Bengal as their family became incredibly wealthy. When they returned to England the aristocracy did not welcome "new money".

== Life ==
Clive was born in Kensington Gore in London in 1735, the youngest of four children born to Elizabeth (born Booth) and Edmund Maskelyne (1698–1744), who served as a barrister-at-law and counsel to the Secretary of State's Office. Her elder brother was the Astronomer Royal Nevil Maskelyne. She lived at home until she was about thirteen when her mother died, and she was sent to stay with relatives in Wiltshire, where she started school when she was about fourteen. Mrs Saintsbury of Cirencester taught her and she was gifted at French.

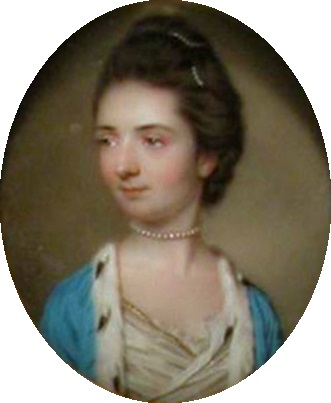
A miniature of her by John Smart in 1770

She went out to India at the suggestion of her brother Edmund with the intention of chasing Robert Clive, who was a colleague. When she set out he was a man who reportedly had fallen in love with her portrait; when she arrived Robert Clive was a hero. Her voyage was not in vain as she married him at St. Mary's Church in (then) Madras on 18 February 1753. They returned to England, but they returned in 1755 for five years as the British East India Company consolidated its position in Bengal. Her husband died in 1774. She had to find a home. In 1781 the owner of Englefield House and estate in Berkshire was short of money and decided to rent the house. The rent was set for 400 guineas p.a. but it was let to her for 300 as the owner was keen to find the right tenant who would not interfere with the house's character too much. The house was rented complete with a deer park, three manors and with a library of thousands of pounds' worth of books.

Clive died in Oakly Park, Bromfield, Shropshire, in 1817.

== Family ==
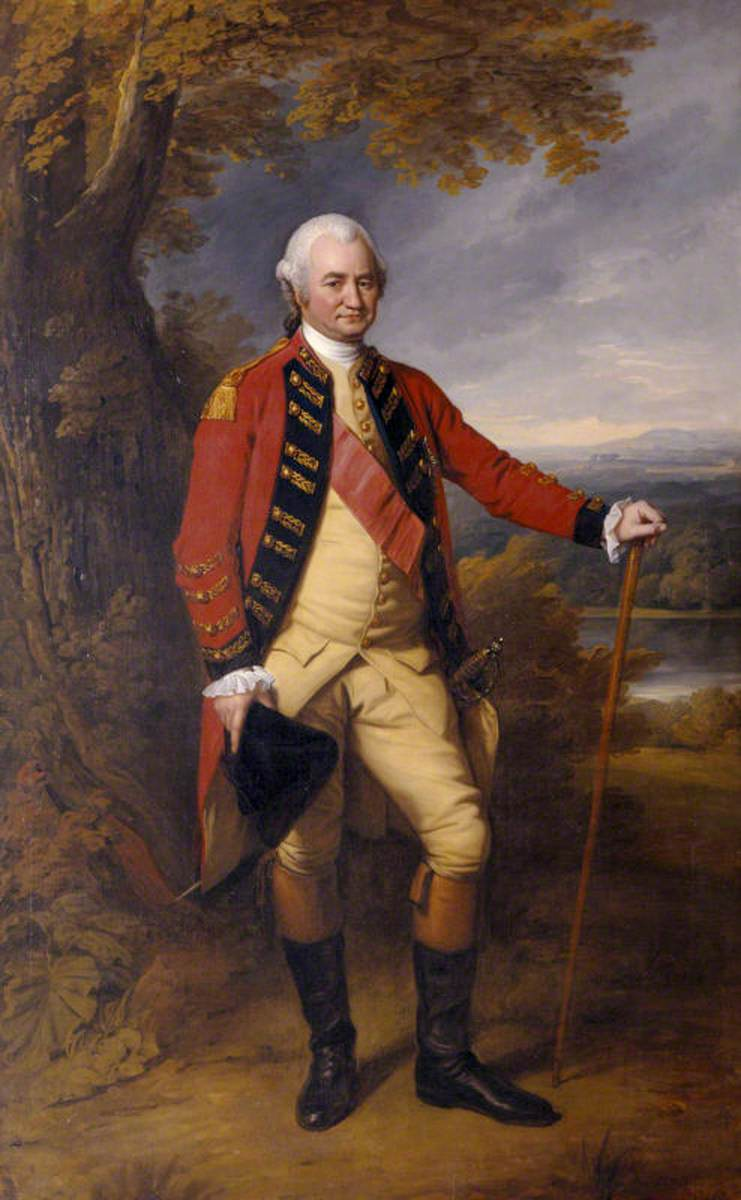
Portrait of Robert Clive by Nathaniel Dance-Holland, 1770

She and Robert Clive had nine children:

- Edward Clive, 1st Earl of Powis (1754–1839), succeeded his father
- Richard Clive (4 March 1755 – bur. 19 October 1755), died young
- Jane Clive (15 June 1756 – September 1759), died young
- Robert Clive (13 October 1759 – June 1760), died young
- Hon. Rebecca Clive (15 September 1760 – December 1795), married in 1780 to Lt.-Gen. John Robinson, MP
- Hon. Charlotte Clive (19 January 1762 – 20 October 1795), died unmarried
- Hon. Margaretta Clive (15 August 1763 – August 1814), married 11 April 1780 Lt.-Col. Lambert Theodore Walpole (killed in 1798 Wexford Rebellion), great-nephew of Robert Walpole
- Hon. Elizabeth Clive (30 October 1764 – bur. 18 December 1764), died young
- Lt.-Col. Hon. Robert Clive (14 August 1769 – 28 July 1833), MP for Ludlow; died unmarried
