= The Pybus Family =

Painting by Nathaniel Dance-Holland

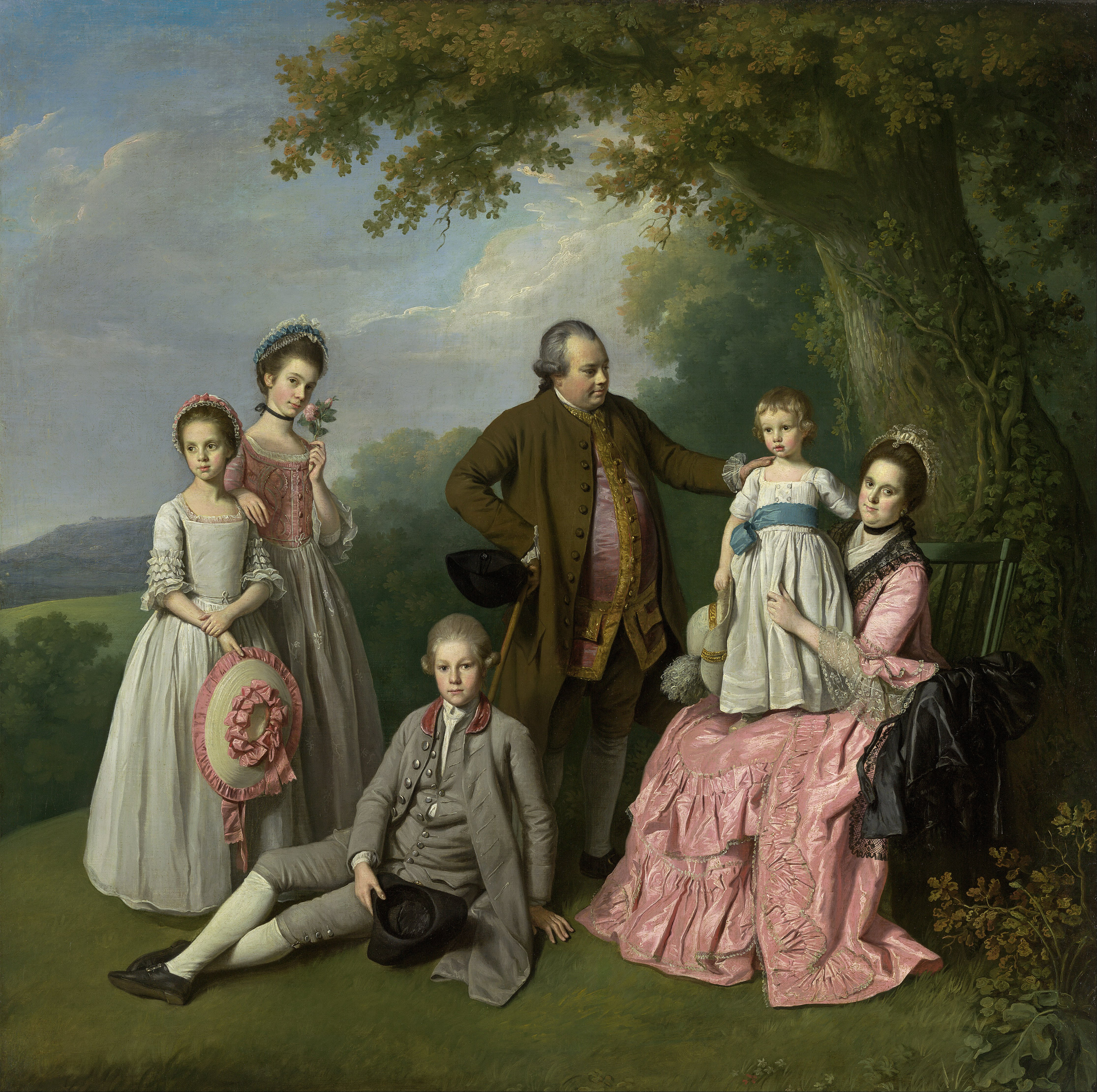
- Artist: Nathaniel Dance-Holland
- Year: c. 1769
- Type: Oil on canvas, portrait painting
- Dimensions: 142.8 cm × 140.2 cm (56.22 in × 55.19 in)
- Location: National Gallery of Victoria, Melbourne

The Pybus Family is an oil on canvas portrait painting by the British artist Nathaniel Dance-Holland, from c. 1769.

== History and description ==
A group portrait, it features the East India Company official John Pybus, his wife Martha Pybus and their four children. Pybus spent many years abroad in India and the Dutch East Indies before returning with his family to England in 1768. Dance-Holland was a fashionable portraitist who had displayed paintings of George III and Charlotte of Mecklenburg-Strelitz at the Royal Academy's inaugural Summer Exhibition of 1769. Today the painting is in the collection of the National Gallery of Victoria in Melbourne, having been acquired in 2003.

The portrait of the family is set outdors, with the mother seated, at the right, under a large tree, presenting her youngest son on her lap. The father stares and touches him gently. The older son sits in the ground, calmly looking at the viewer, while is two sisters are standing, at the left. The tallest sister holds and appears to be smelling some roses, while she looks at the viewer. The other sister looks sideways, holding her hat. At the background, is visible a countryside landscape.

== Bibliography ==
- Barnden, Sally & McMullan, Gordon & Retford, Kate & Tambling, Kirsten (ed.). Shakespeare's Afterlife in the Royal Collection: Dynasty, Ideology, and National Culture. Oxford University Press, 2025.
- Duncum, Paul. Images of Childhood: A Visual History From Stone to Screen. Bloomsbury Publishing, 2023.
