= Palazzo Lanfreducci =

Building in Pisa, Italy

Coordinates: 43°43′00″N 10°23′56″E

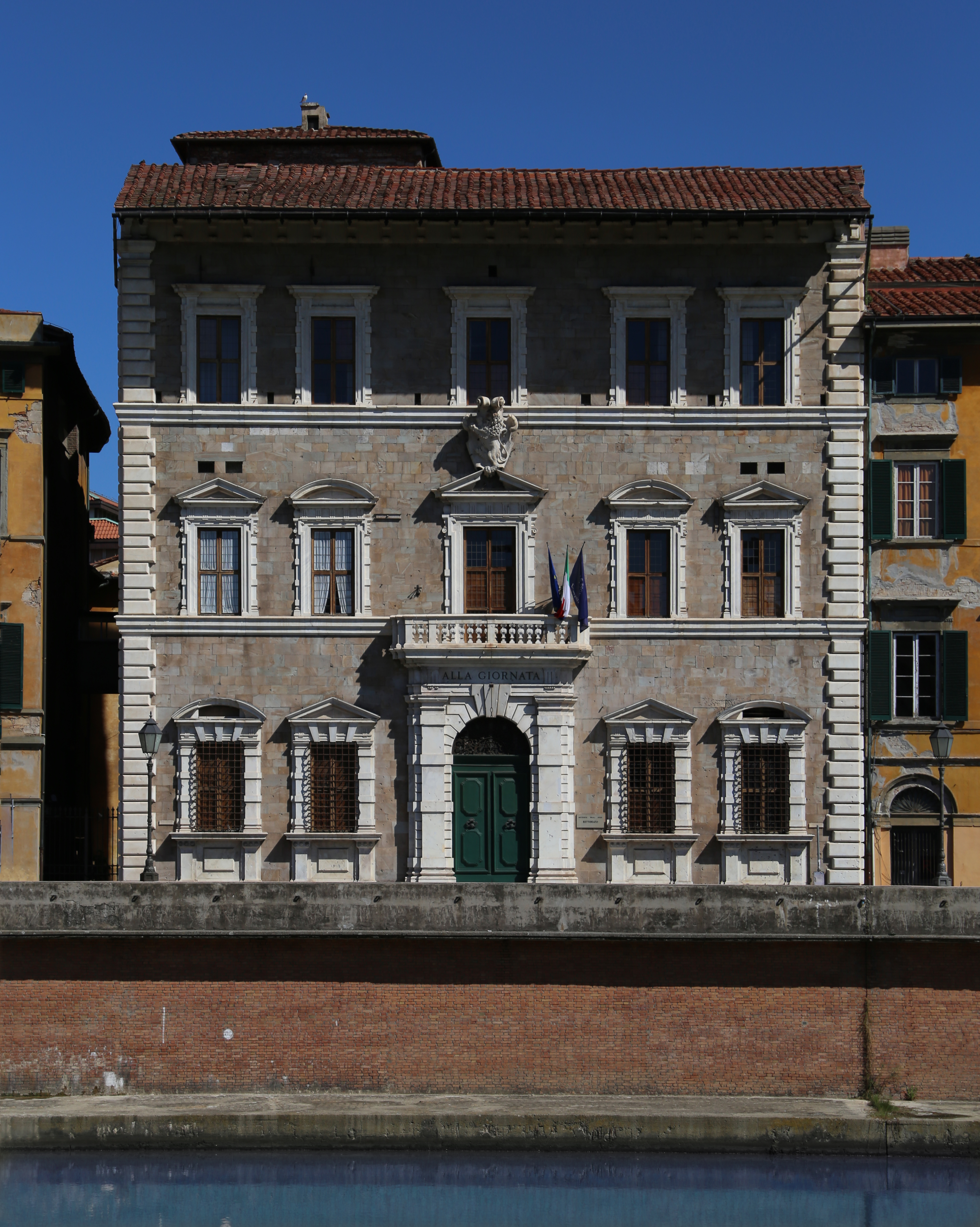
Palazzo Lanfreducci

The Palazzo Lanfreducci, also called the Palazzo Upezzinghi after 19th century owners, or the Palazzo Alla Giornata is a late-Mannerist- or early Baroque-style palace located on Lungarno Pacinotti #43, on the north bank of the Arno river, in the city of Pisa, region of Tuscany, Italy.

== History ==
Construction began in 1607 based on a design by Cosimo Pagliani, and commissioned by Francesco Lanfreducci, a member of the Knights of Malta, who had returned from a long imprisonment in Algeria. The entrance portal has a coat of arms with lions, and an inscription stating Alla Giornata with three links of chain. The interiors were frescoed in the 18th century by Giovanni Battista Tempesti. The palace now houses the Rector of the University of Pisa.
