= Portrait of James Cook =

Painting by Nathaniel Dance-Holland

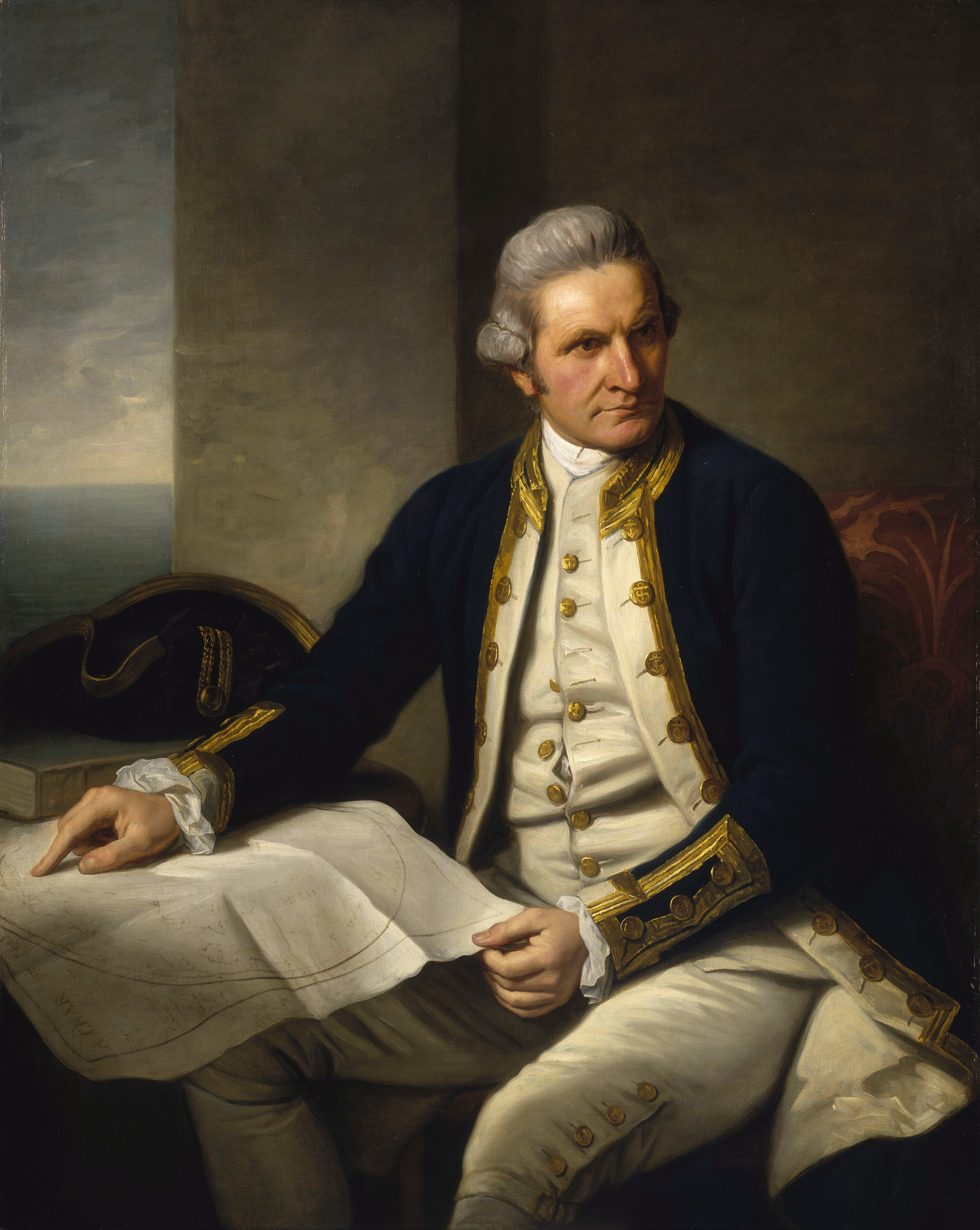
- Artist: Nathaniel Dance-Holland
- Year: c. 1775
- Type: Oil on canvas, portrait painting
- Dimensions: 127 cm × 101.6 cm (50 in × 40.0 in)
- Location: National Maritime Museum, London

Portrait of James Cook is an oil on canvas portrait painting by Sir Nathaniel Dance-Holland, from c. 1775. It is held in the National Maritime Museum, in Greenwich.

== History and description ==
It depicts the British explorer and Royal Navy officer James Cook. Known for his voyages in the Pacific Ocean and visits to New Zealand, Hawaii and elsewhere, he was subsequently killed in Hawaii in 1779. Dance-Holland spent many years in Italy before returning to Britain to become a leading portrait painter.

Cook is portrayed seated in a room, with an open window into the sea. He is wearing the dress uniform of a captain and holds his own map of the Southern Ocean with his hand pointing to the eastern coast of Australia.

== Bibliography ==
- Hamilton, James C. Captain James Cook and the Search for Antarctica. Pen and Sword History, 2020.
- Moon, Paul. A Draught of the South Land: Mapping New Zealand from Tasman to Cook.
- Palmer, Allison Lee. Historical Dictionary of Neoclassical Art and Architecture. Scarecrow Press, 2011.
- Quilley, Geoff & Bonehill, Jane (ed.) William Hodges 1744-1797: The Art of Exploration. Yale University Press, 2004.
