= Self-Portrait (Dance-Holland) =

Painting by Nathaniel Dance-Holland

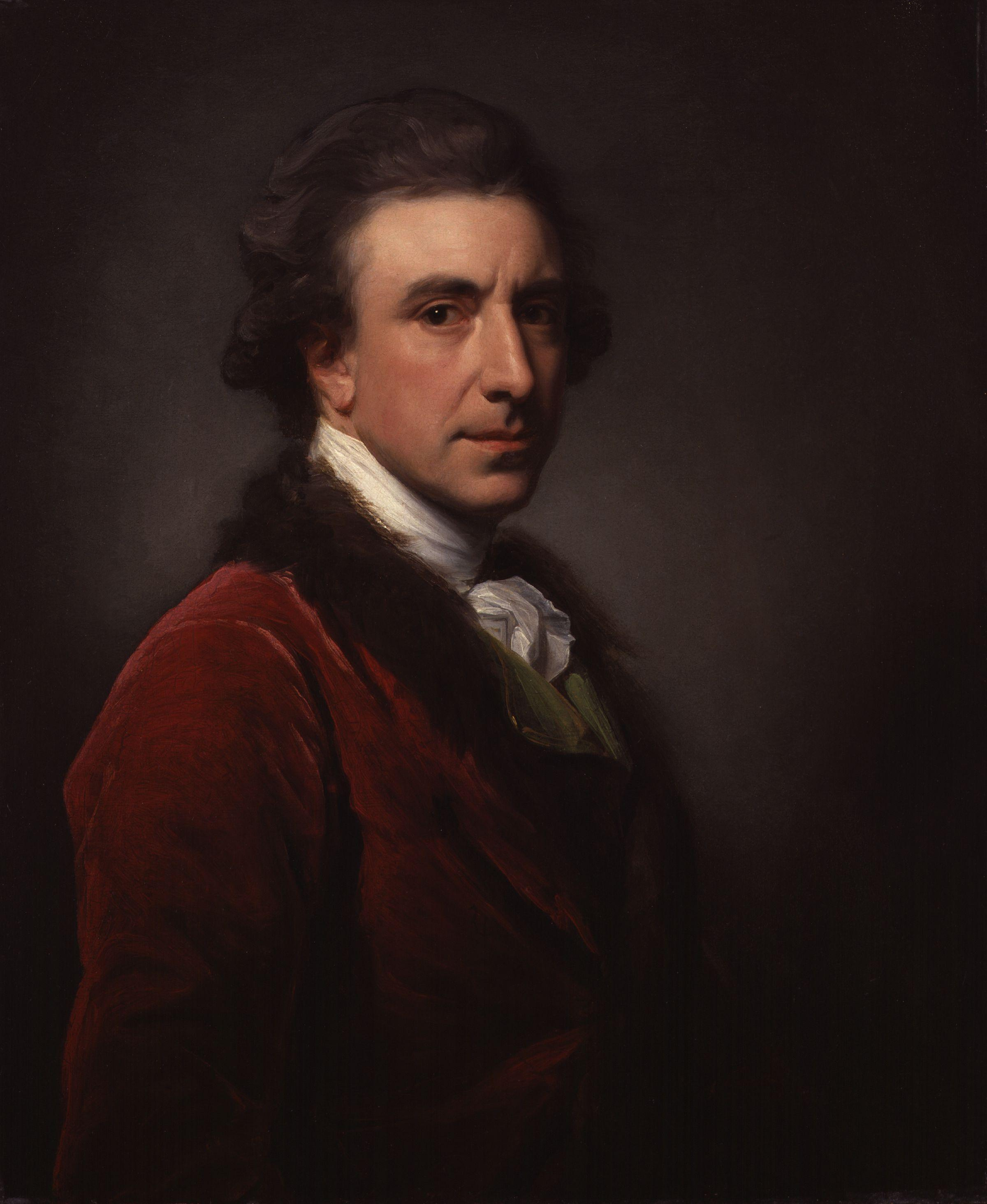
- Artist: Nathaniel Dance-Holland
- Year: c. 1773
- Type: Oil on canvas, portrait painting
- Dimensions: 73.7 cm × 61 cm (29.0 in × 24 in)
- Location: National Portrait Gallery; London

Self-Portrait is a c.1773 portrait painting by the English artist Nathaniel Dance-Holland. A self-portrait, it features Dance-Holland in the fashionable style of the era. Dance-Holland spent a decade in Italy from 1754 and initially produced neoclassical history paintings. On his return to Britain in 1765 he became a leading portrait painter and was one of the founder members of the Royal Academy. He later served as a Member of Parliament.

It was at one point claimed that it might be the self-portrait he supplied to the Society of Dilettanti when he became a member in 1777, however he had not supplied a painting by the time he resigned in 1784. Today the painting is in the collection of the National Portrait Gallery in London, having been acquired in 1948.

== Bibliography ==
- Barnden, Sally & McMullan, Gordon & Retford, Kate & Tambling, Kirsten (ed.). Shakespeare's Afterlife in the Royal Collection: Dynasty, Ideology, and National Culture. Oxford University Press, 2025.
- Fenton, James. School of Genius: A History of the Royal Academy of Arts. Harry N. Abrams, 2006.
- Ingamells, John. National Portrait Gallery Mid-Georgian Portraits, 1760–1790. National Portrait Gallery, 2004.
- Palmer, Allison Lee. Historical Dictionary of Neoclassical Art and Architecture. Scarecrow Press, 2011.
