= Portrait of David Garrick (Kauffman) =

Painting by Angelica Kauffman

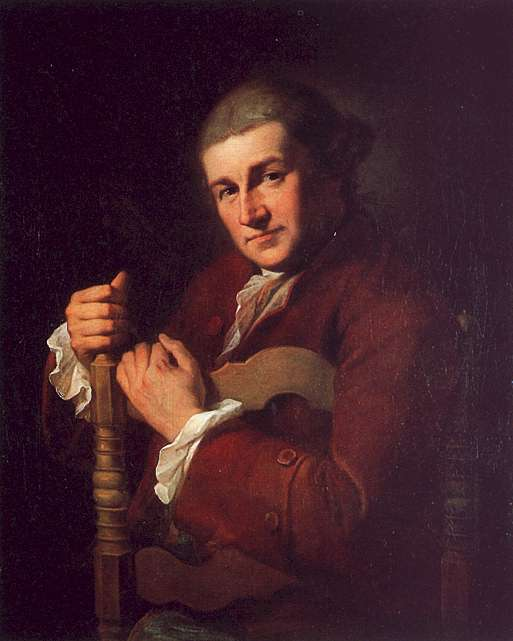
- Artist: Angelica Kauffman
- Year: 1764
- Type: Oil on canvas, portrait painting
- Dimensions: 84 cm × 69 cm (33 in × 27 in)
- Location: Burghley House; Lincolnshire

Portrait of David Garrick is a 1764 portrait painting by the Swiss artist Angelica Kauffman. It depicts the English stage actor David Garrick. Garrick, the most celebrated actor of his generation, was visiting Italy when he sat for the portrait. He commissioned Kauffman, then a largely unknown young artist, to produce an informal portrait of him during his stay in Naples.

The work heralded Kauffman's successful arrival in Britain. The painting was displayed in London at the annual exhibition of the Free Society of Artists (not to be confused with the rival Society of Artists of Great Britain) in 1765. It was acquired by the Earl of Exeter who had encountered Kauffman while on his Grand Tour and promoted her career. It is now in the collection of Burghley House in Lincolnshire.

== See also ==
- List of paintings by Angelica Kauffman
- Portrait of David Garrick, a 1764 painting by the Italian artist Pompeo Batoni

== Bibliography ==
- Moyle, Franny. Mrs Kauffman and Madame Le Brun: The Entwined Lives of Two Great Eighteenth-Century Women Artists. Bloomsbury Publishing, 2025.
- Natter, Tobias G. Angelica Kauffman: A Woman of Immense Talent. Hatje Cantz, 2007.
- Woodall, Joanna. Portraiture: Facing the Subject. Manchester University Press, 1996.
