= Portrait of Robert Clive =

1770 painting by Nathaniel Dance-Holland

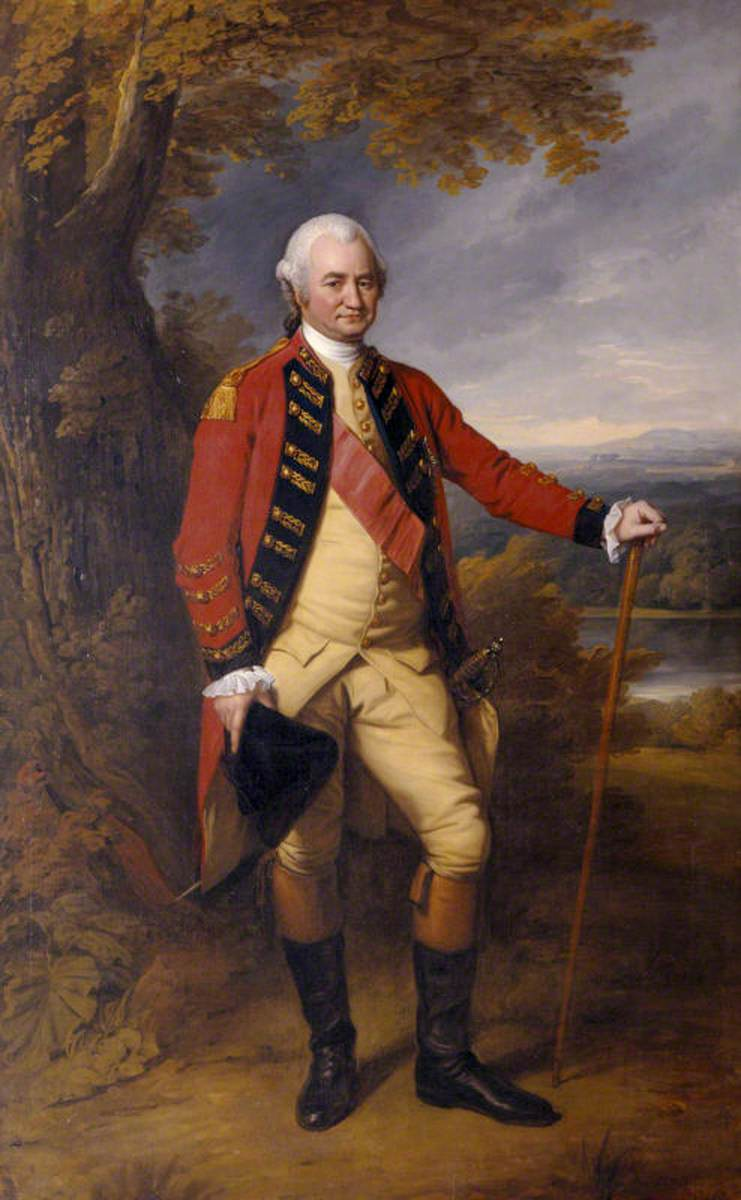
- Artist: Nathaniel Dance-Holland
- Year: c.1770
- Type: Oil on canvas, portrait painting
- Dimensions: 233.7 cm × 144.8 cm (92.0 in × 57.0 in)
- Location: Powis Castle, Powys

Portrait of Robert Clive is a 1770 portrait painting by the British artist Nathaniel Dance-Holland. It depicts the soldier and former governor of Bengal Robert Clive in military uniform and wearing the Order of the Bath. The image was a popular one and it was widely reproduced in engravings. The original full-length portrait is at Powis Castle, which belonged to descendants of Clive and is now in the control of the National Trust. A reduced vision, with the tranquil rural background of a river scene is replaced by the Battle of Plassey, is in the National Portrait Gallery in London.

Dance-Holland also produced a painting of the sitter's wife Margaret Clive around this time.

== Bibliography ==
- Hussey, Christopher. Powis Castle, Montgomeryshire. Wilding & Son, 1953.
- Ingamells, John. National Portrait Gallery Mid-Georgian Portraits, 1760–1790. National Portrait Gallery, 2004.
