= Jacques-Louis Copia =

French engraver

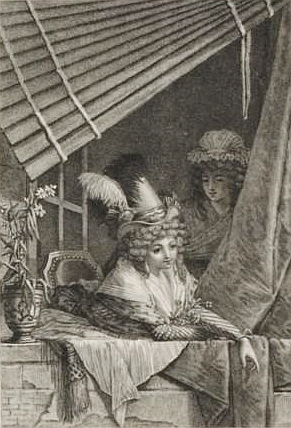
Par ici!... (This way!...): stipple engraving from Prostitutes in Paris during the revolutionary period, 1793-1795, after Jean-Baptiste Mallet.

Jacques-Louis Copia, a French engraver, was born at Landau (then part of France) in 1764. He went to Paris, and among other plates executed a charming little portrait of Queen Marie Antoinette, after Piauger, which is very rare. He also engraved a head of Marat, terribly startling in its ghastliness, from a drawing made by David immediately after his assassination. But Copia is chiefly identified with Prud'hon, the voluptuous genius of whose works no one has more fully comprehended. It must, however, be admitted that, apart from the great painter, Copia would have remained hidden in the crowd. His style was neither original nor brilliant, and his rare qualities of modelling and softness of execution required works suitable for their display. He died in Paris in 1799, unfortunately too early to be able to engrave the greatest works of his friend. But among other pupils he left one, Roger, who caught his manner, and is thought by many to have surpassed his master in the interpretation of the spirit of Prud'hon.

The following are the works of Prud'hon which have been engraved by Copia:

- The French Constitution.
- Equality, and Law; two small bas-reliefs from the preceding composition.
- Liberty.
- The Revenge of Ceres.
- Love brought to reason.
- Love laughing at the tears which he has caused to flow; a companion to the preceding.
- En Jouir; an illustration to Gentil-Bernard's 'Art d'Aimer,' Didot's edition, 1797.
- The First Kiss of Love; and four other illustrations to Rousseau's 'Nouvelle Héloise,' Bossange's edition, 1808.
