= Portrait of Angelica Kauffman (Reynolds) =

Painting by Joshua Reynolds

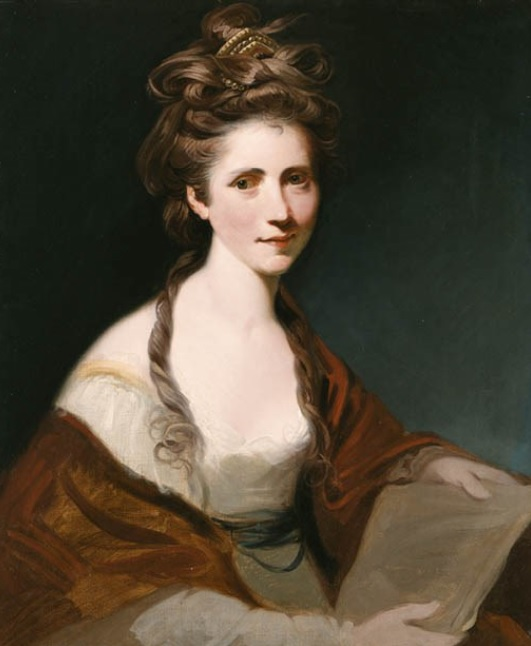
Portrait of Angelica Kauffman by Joshua Reynolds

Portrait of Angelica Kauffman is a painting by Joshua Reynolds, painted in exchange for a portrait of Reynolds by Angelica Kauffman. It was engraved by Francesco Bartolozzi in 1780. Three autograph copies survive – one was collected by Earl Spencer and sold by him in 1983. It was again sold at Christie's in 1999. Another of the autographed copies was last recorded in the Metternich-Winneburg'sche collection in Vienna.
