= Portrait of Angelica Kauffman (Dance-Holland) =

1764 painting by Nathaniel Dance-Holland

- Artist: Nathaniel Dance-Holland
- Year: 1764
- Type: Oil on canvas, portrait painting
- Dimensions: 83 cm × 69 cm (33 in × 27 in)
- Location: Burghley House, Lincolnshire

Portrait of Angelica Kauffman is a 1764 portrait painting by the British artist Nathaniel Dance-Holland. It depicts the Swiss painter Angelica Kauffman around the age of twenty three. The painting was produced in Rome where both were part of a group of foreign group of artists including Benjamin West immersing themselves in Italian history and art. Kauffman is shown as a dedicated student, with an artist's portfolio on her knee.

Dance became known for his Neoclassical style. After moving to London, both painters became founder members of the Royal Academy of Arts in 1768. Today the painting is in the collection of Burghley House in Lincolnshire. It was acquired by the Earl of Exeter who she had met in Naples when he was on his Grand Tour.

== Bibliography ==
- Ingamells, John. National Portrait Gallery Mid-Georgian Portraits, 1760–1790. National Portrait Gallery, 2004.
- Moyle, Franny. Mrs Kauffman and Madame Le Brun: The Entwined Lives of Two Great Eighteenth-Century Women Artists. Bloomsbury Publishing, 2025.
