= Portrait of Prince Edward, Duke of York =

Painting by Pompeo Batoni

Portrait of the Duke of York
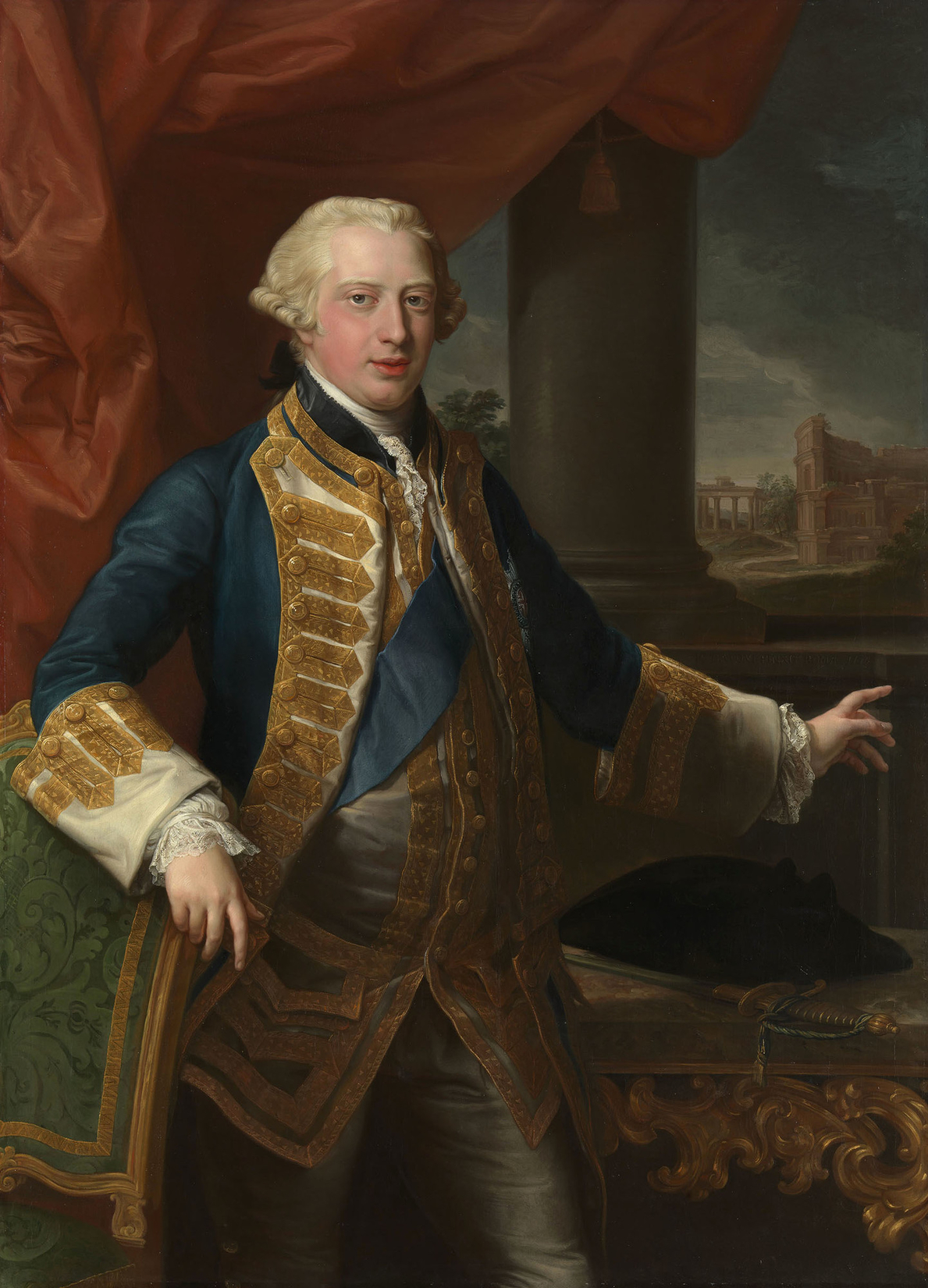
- Artist: Pompeo Batoni
- Year: 1764
- Type: Oil on canvas, portrait
- Dimensions: 137.9 cm × 100.2 cm (54.3 in × 39.4 in)
- Location: Royal Collection; London

Portrait of the Duke of York is a 1764 portrait painting by the Italian artist Pompeo Batoni depicting Prince Edward, Duke of York and Albany. York was the younger brother of George III and had been heir presumptive to the throne from 1760 until the birth of his nephew George, Prince of Wales in 1762. From 1763 to 1764 following the end of the Seven Years' War, York went on a Grand Tour around Continental Europe. While in Rome he sat for Batoni, a leading portraitist who specialised in painting visiting Britons. York is shown in the uniform of a Flag officer of the Royal Navy and the Order of the Garter, with the Colosseum visible behind him.

York gave the painting to Horace Mann, the British ambassador in Florence. His nephew presented the work to George III in 1787. By 1819 it was hanging in the Coffee Room at Buckingham Palace. It remains in the Royal Collection today.

== Bibliography ==
- Black, Jeremy. The Hanoverians: The History of a Dynasty. A&C Black, 2007.
- Bowron, Edgar Peters & Kerber, Peter Björn. Pompeo Batoni: Prince of Painters in Eighteenth-century Rome. Yale University Press, 2007.
- Esposito, Donato. Sir Joshua Reynolds: The Acquisition of Genius. Sansom, 2009.
