= Nathaniel Dance-Holland =

British painter and politician (1735–1811)

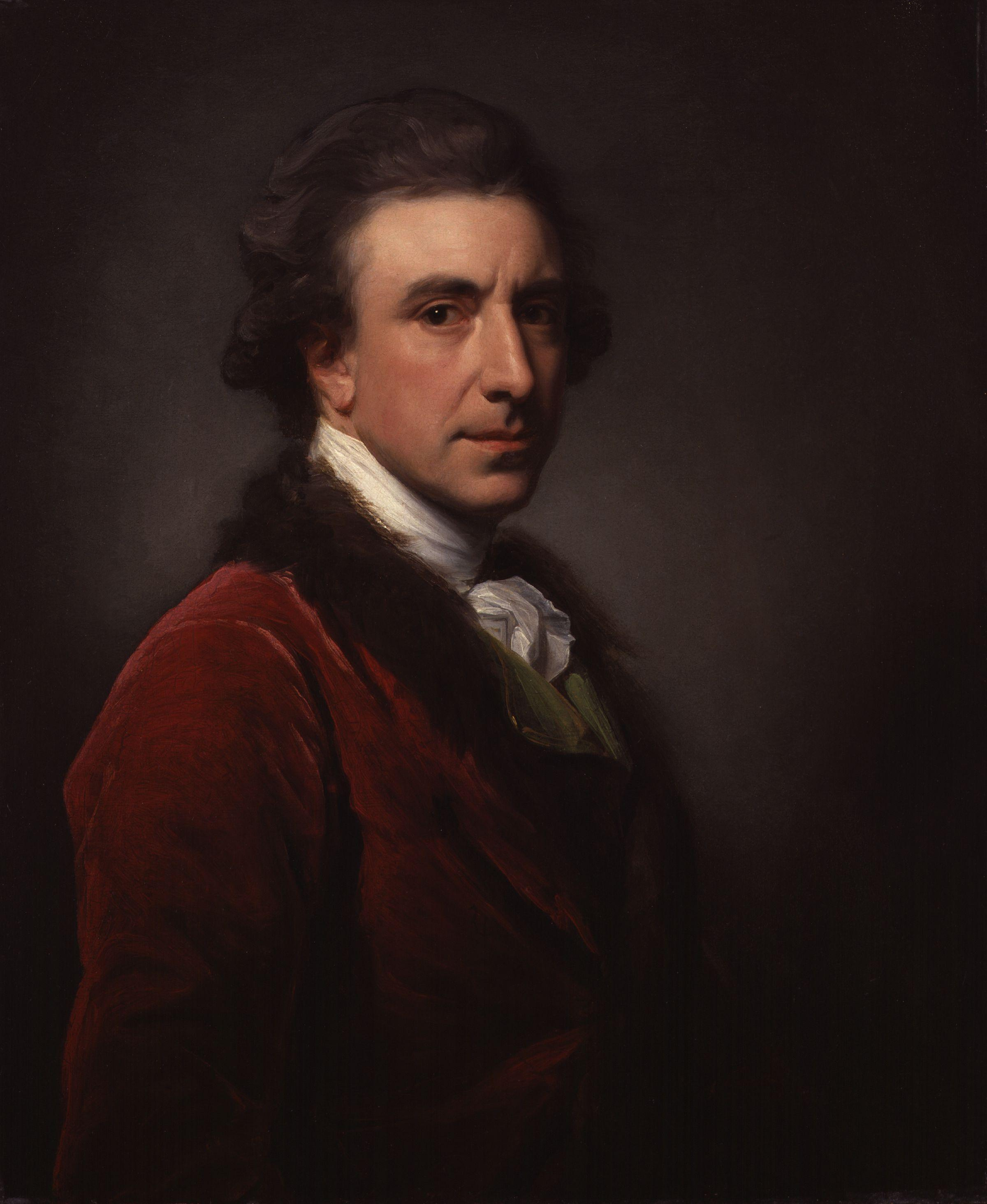
- Self-Portrait, c. 1773
- Born: 8 May 1735; London, England
- Died: 15 October 1811 (aged 76); Winchester, Hampshire, England
- Occupations: Painter; politician

Sir Nathaniel Dance-Holland, 1st Baronet RA (8 May 1735 – 15 October 1811) was a British painter and politician.

== Early life ==
The third son of architect George Dance the Elder, Dance (he added the 'Holland' suffix later in life) studied art under Francis Hayman, and like many contemporaries also studied in Italy. There he met Angelica Kauffman and painted several historic and classical paintings.

== Career ==
On his return to Britain, he became a successful portrait painter. With Hayman and his architect brother, George, he was one of the founding members of the Royal Academy in 1768. He was commissioned to paint King George III and his queen, plus Captain James Cook and actor David Garrick. His group portrait The Pybus Family (1769) is in the collection of the National Gallery of Victoria, Melbourne, Australia.

In 1790, he gave up his artistic career and became Member of Parliament for East Grinstead in Sussex. He served this seat until 1802 when he moved to Great Bedwyn in Wiltshire, serving until 1806.

In 1807 he moved back to East Grinstead, serving until he died in 1811. He was made a baronet in 1800; the title became extinct on his death.

== Family ==
He was married to Harriet, the daughter of Sir Cecil Bishopp, 6th Baronet and the widow of Thomas Dummer, for whom his brother had designed the house at Cranbury Park, near Winchester. They lived at Little Wittenham Manor in Berkshire (now Oxfordshire). His wife survived him until 1825. His nephew, Sir Nathaniel Dance, was an East India Company officer famous for his actions at the naval Battle of Pulo Aura in 1804.

== Gallery ==
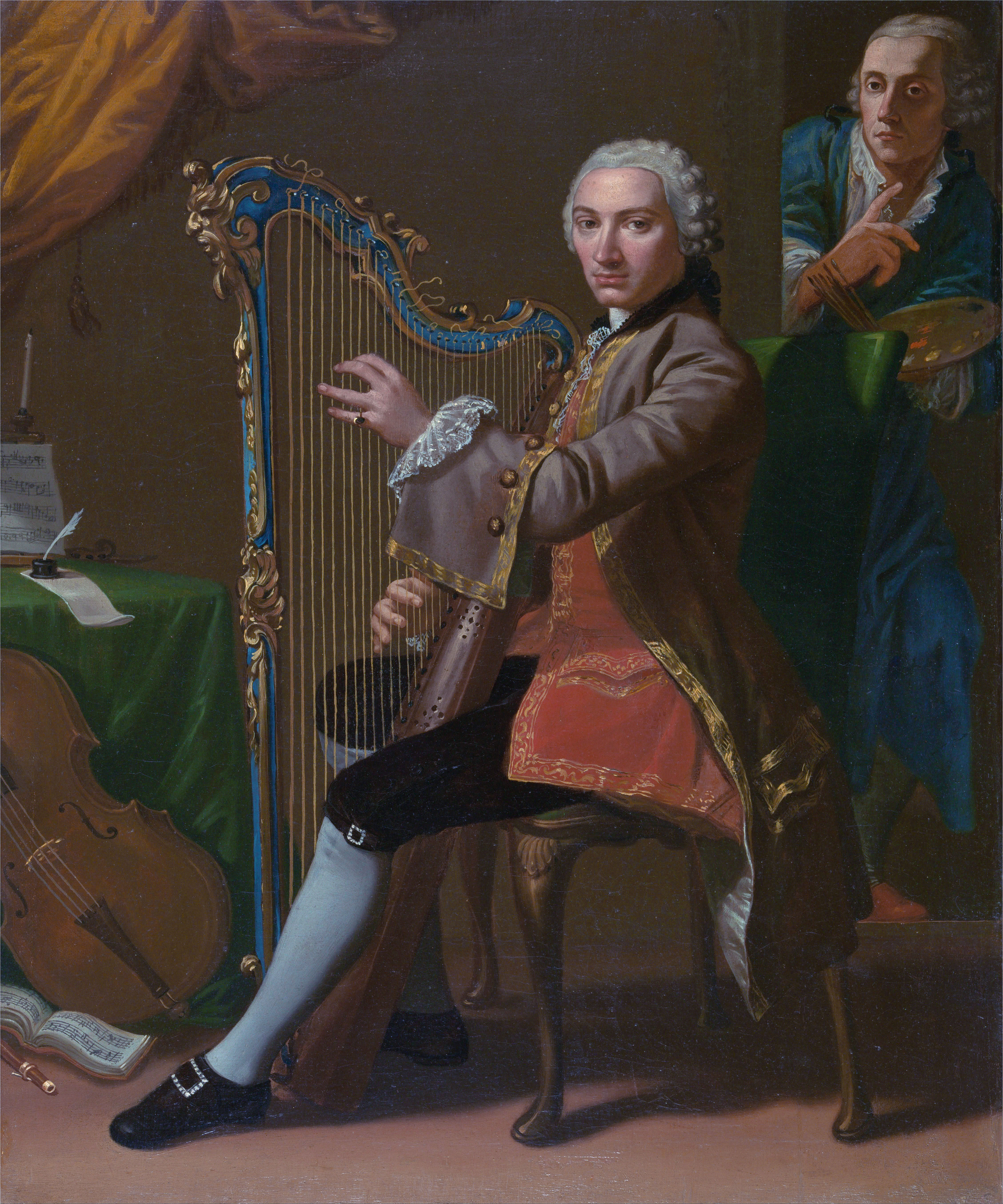
Cristiano Giuseppe Lidarti and Giovanni Battista Tempesti, 1760

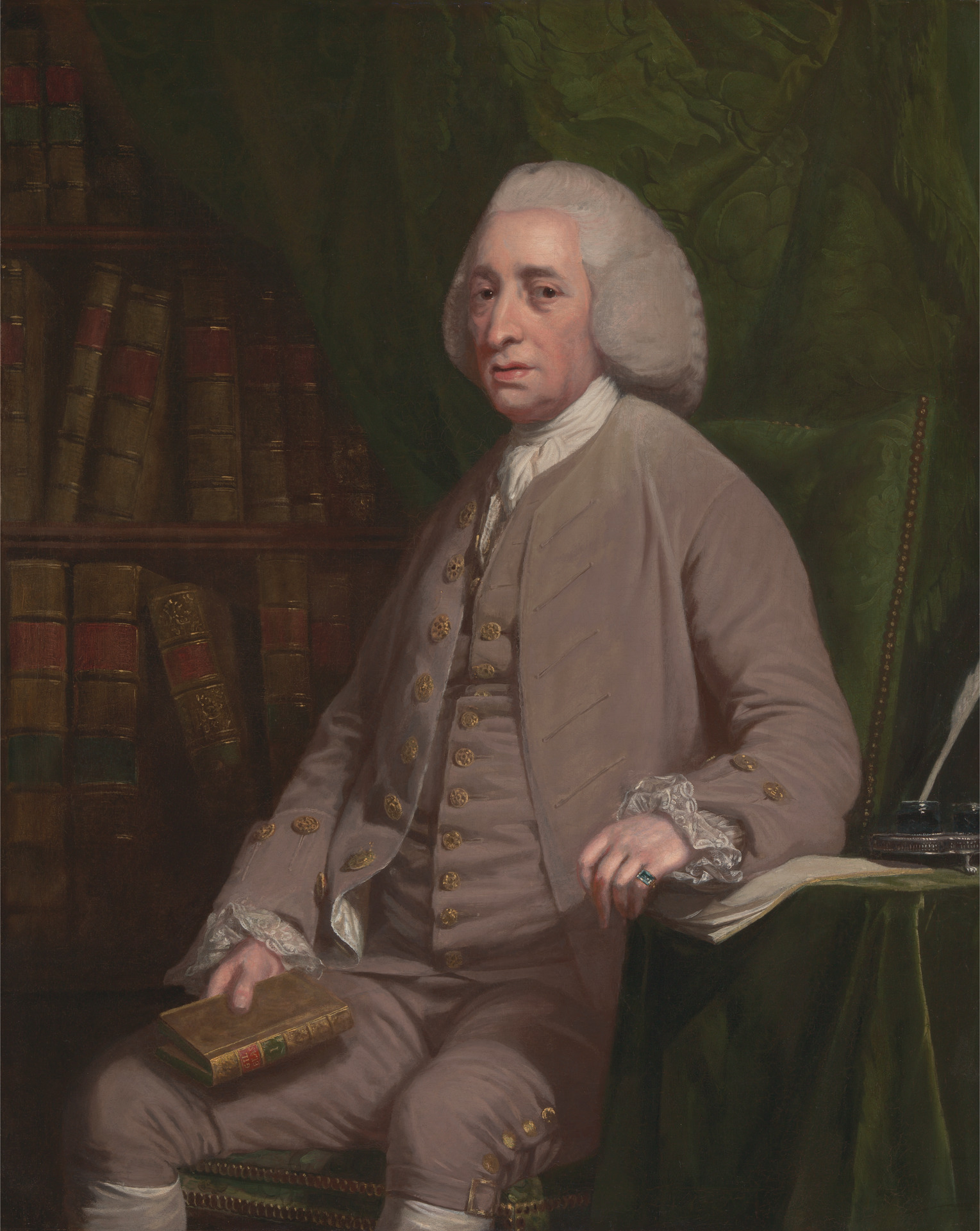
Tobias Smollett, 1764

Portrait of Angelica Kauffman, 1764

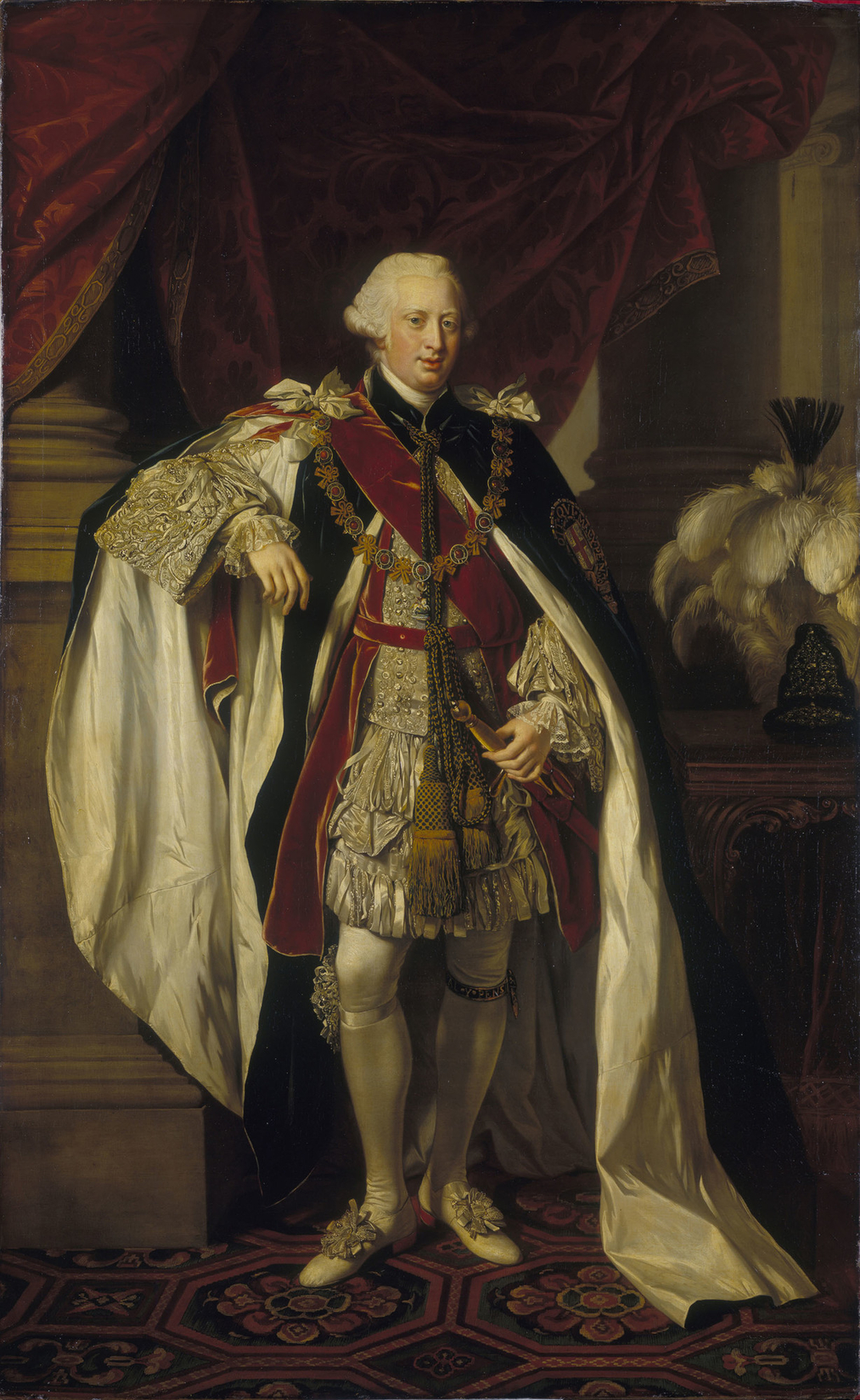
Edward, Duke of York, 1765

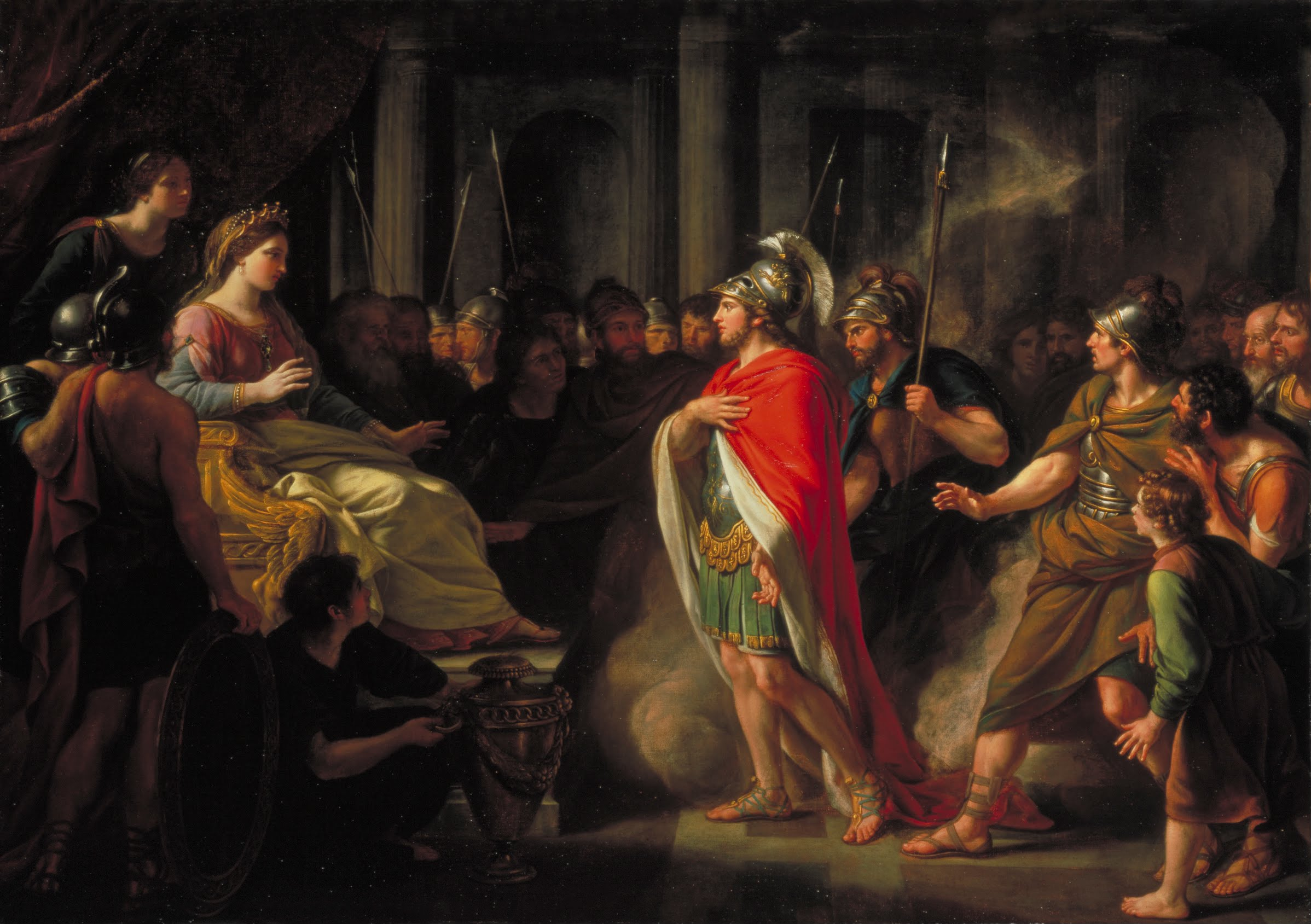
The Meeting of Dido and Aeneas, 1766

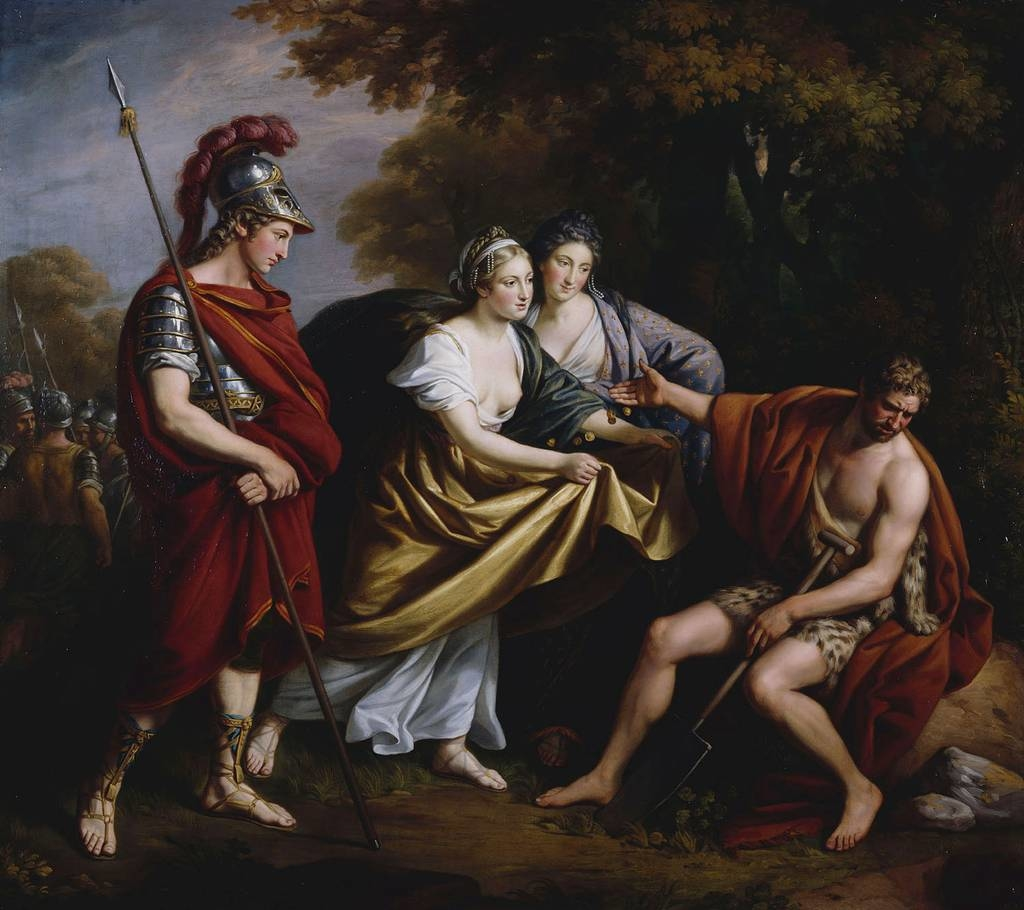
Timon of Athens, 1767

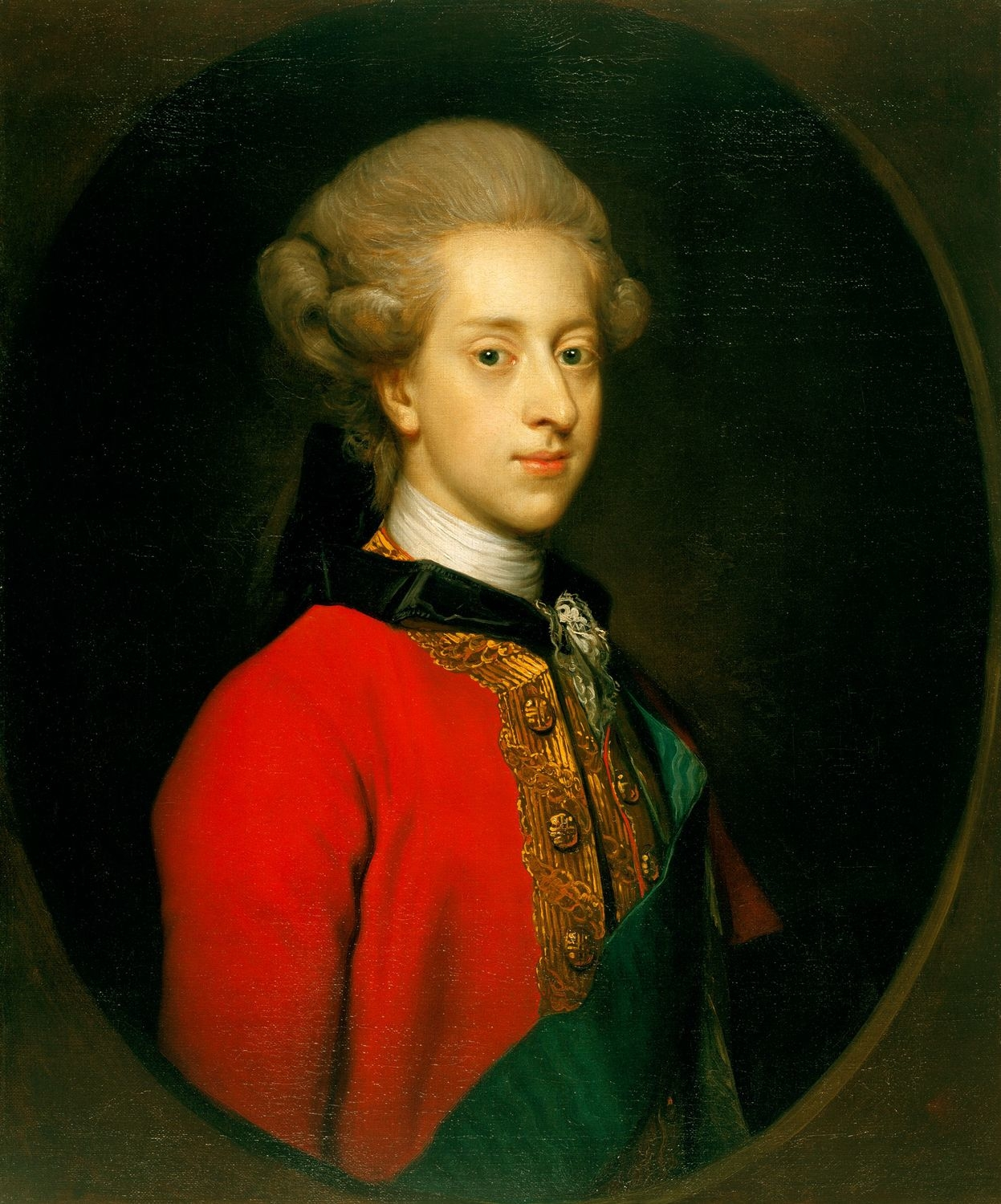
Christian VII of Denmark, 1768

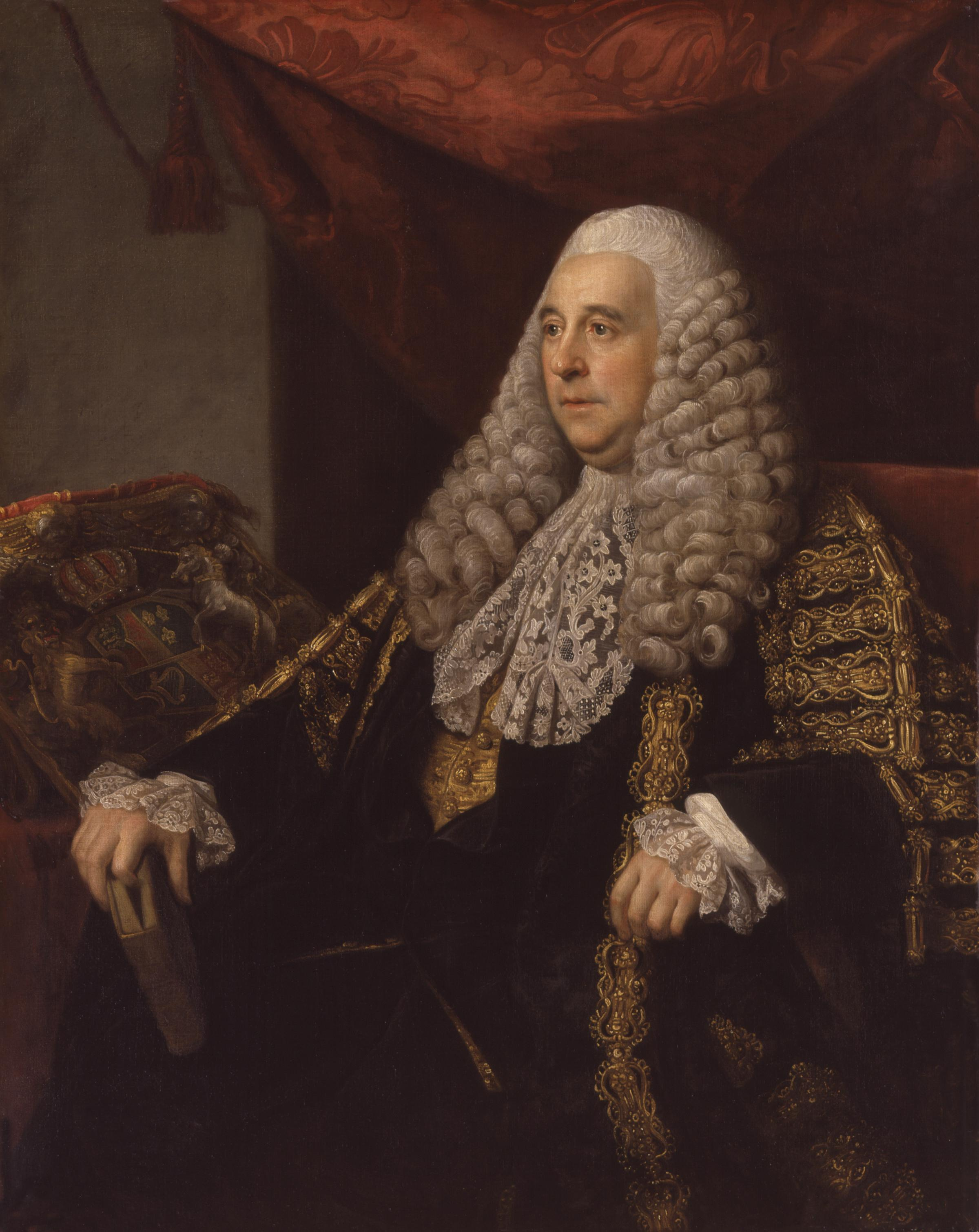
Earl Camden, c.1768

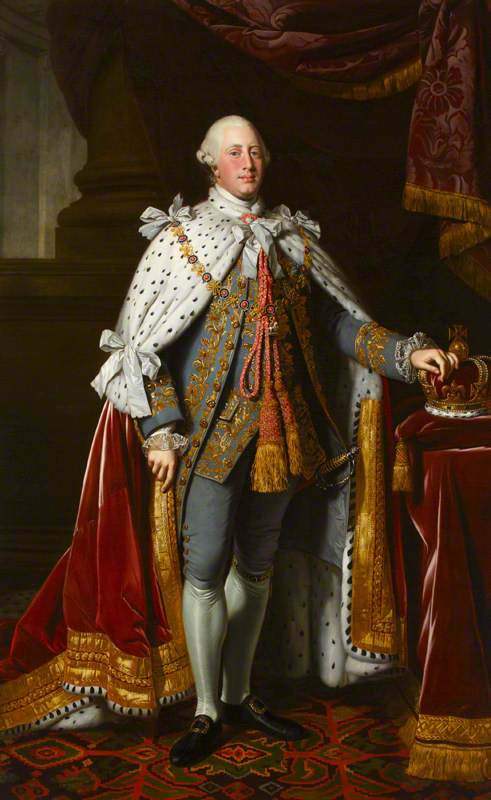
Portrait of George III, 1768

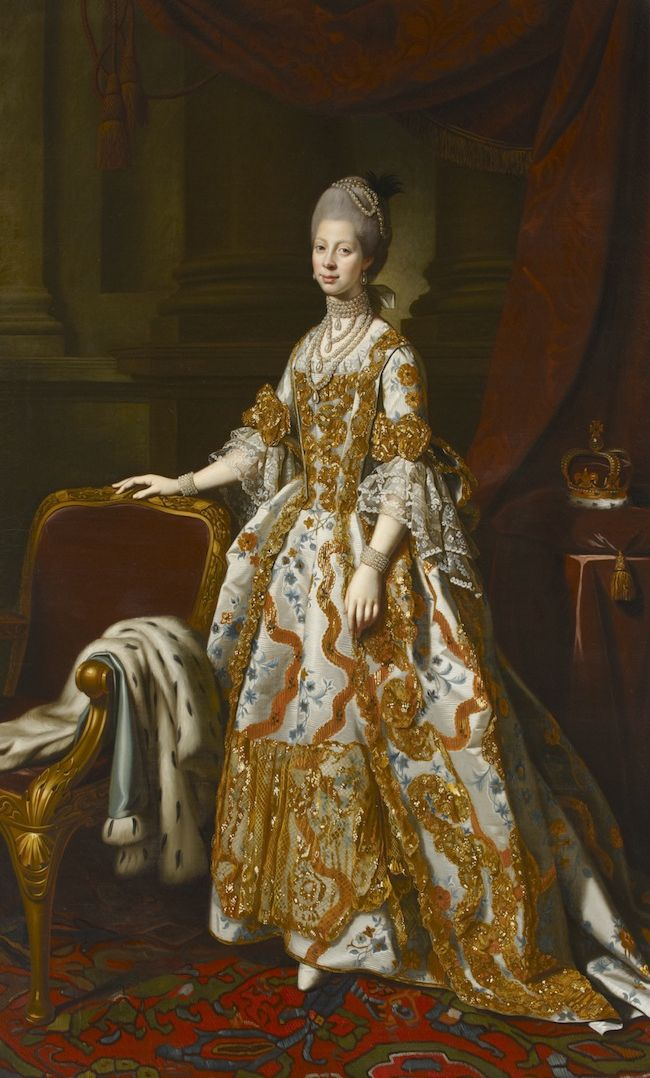
Portrait of Queen Charlotte, 1769

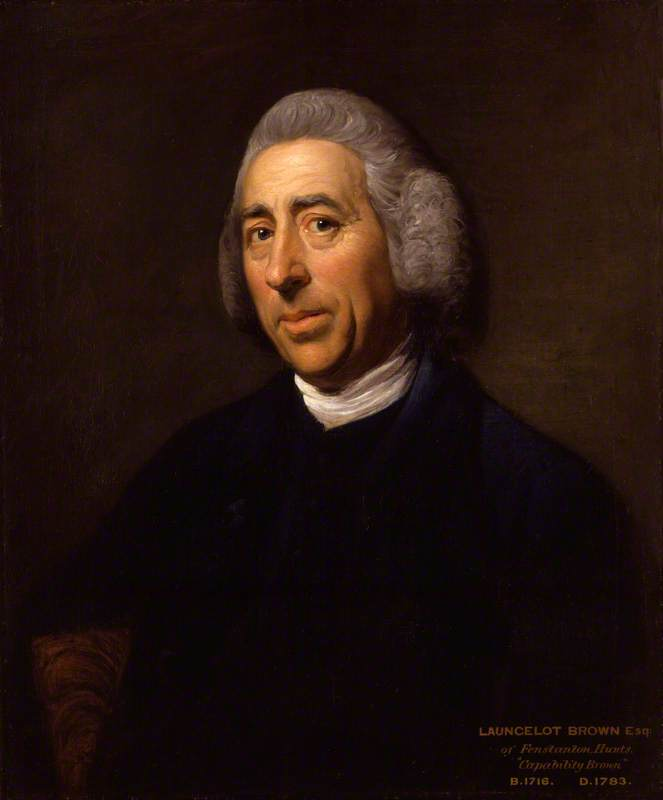
Portrait of Capability Brown, 1769

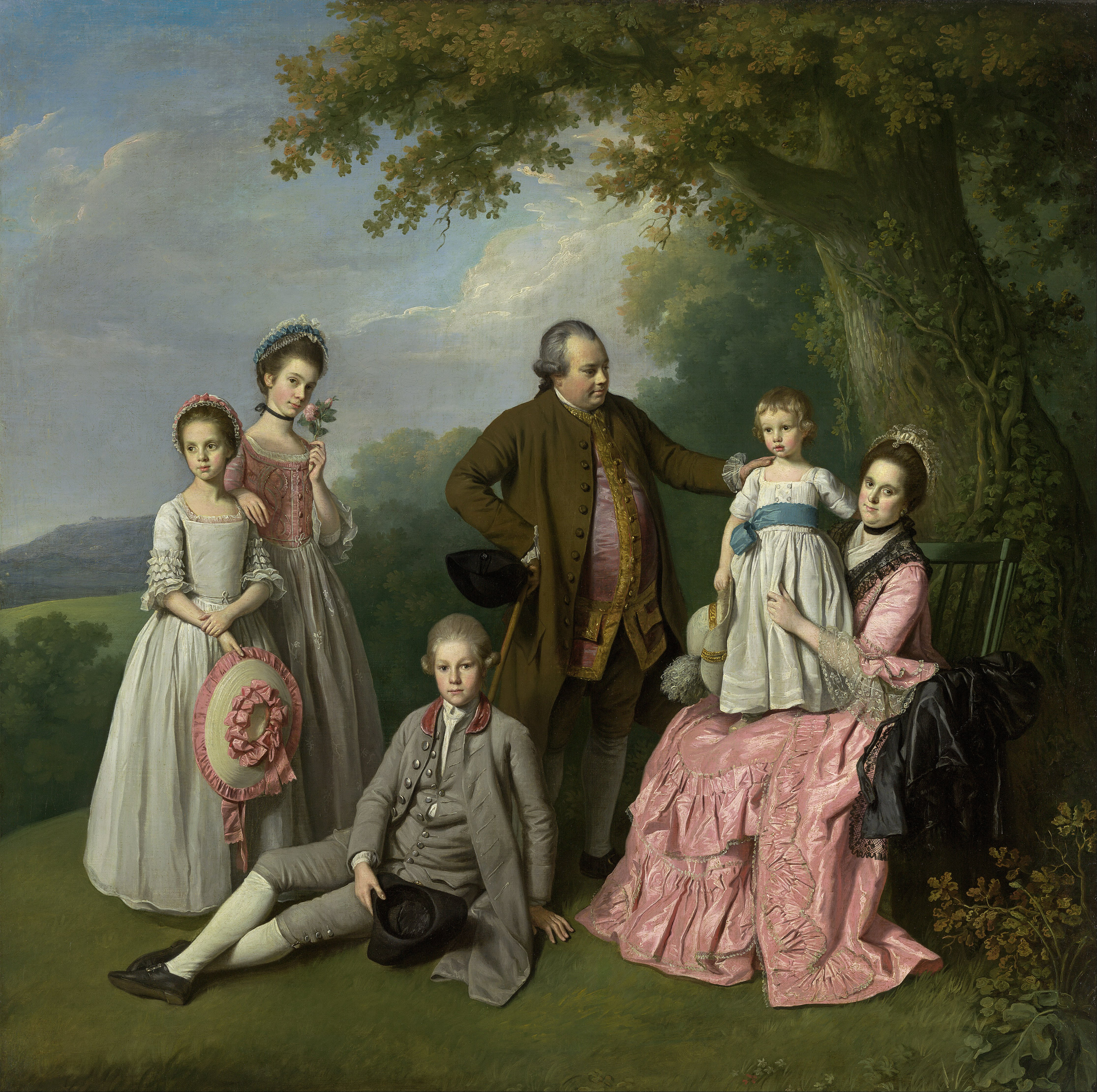
The Pybus Family, 1769

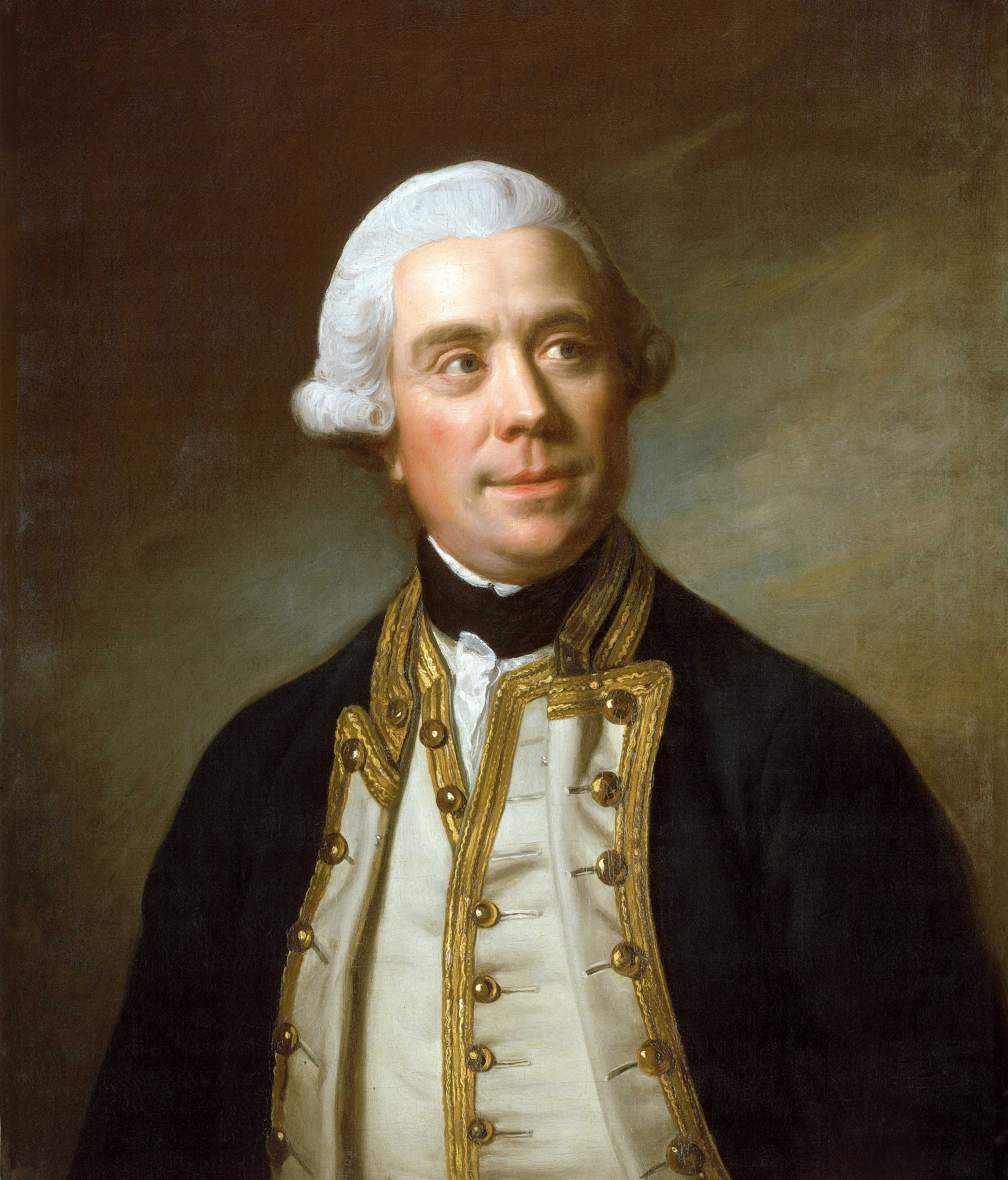
Samuel Barrington, 1770

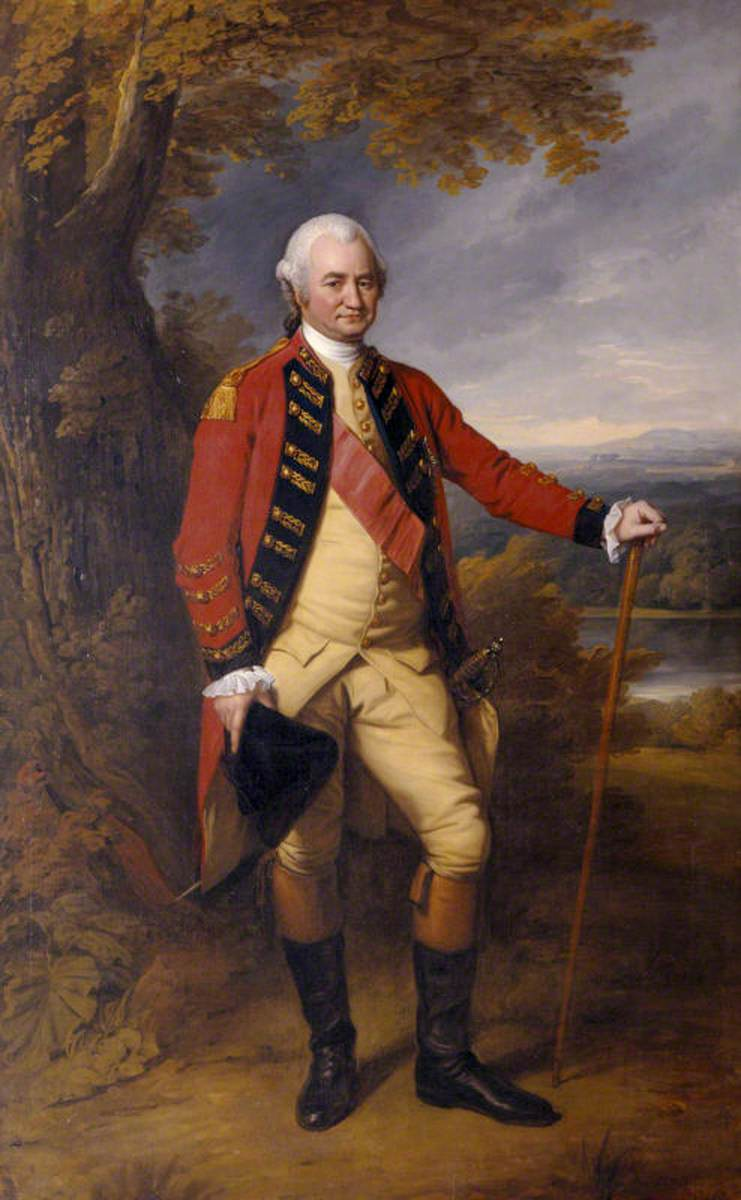
Portrait of Robert Clive, 1770

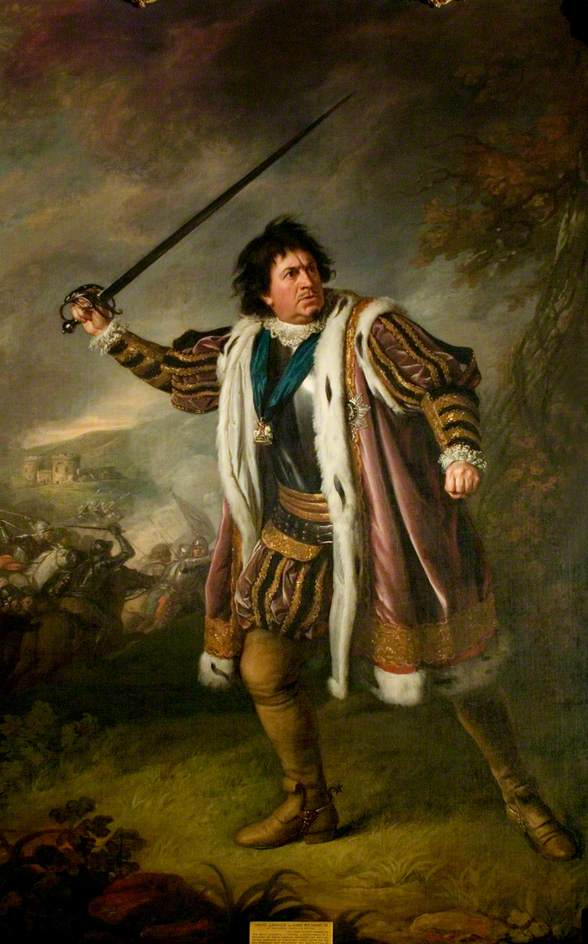
David Garrick as Richard III at Bosworth, 1771

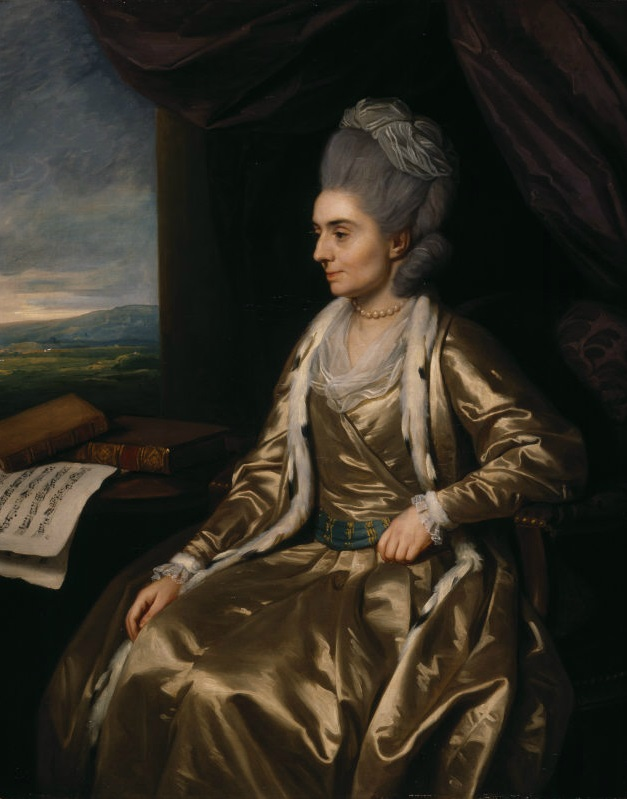
Lady Clive, c. 1770–74

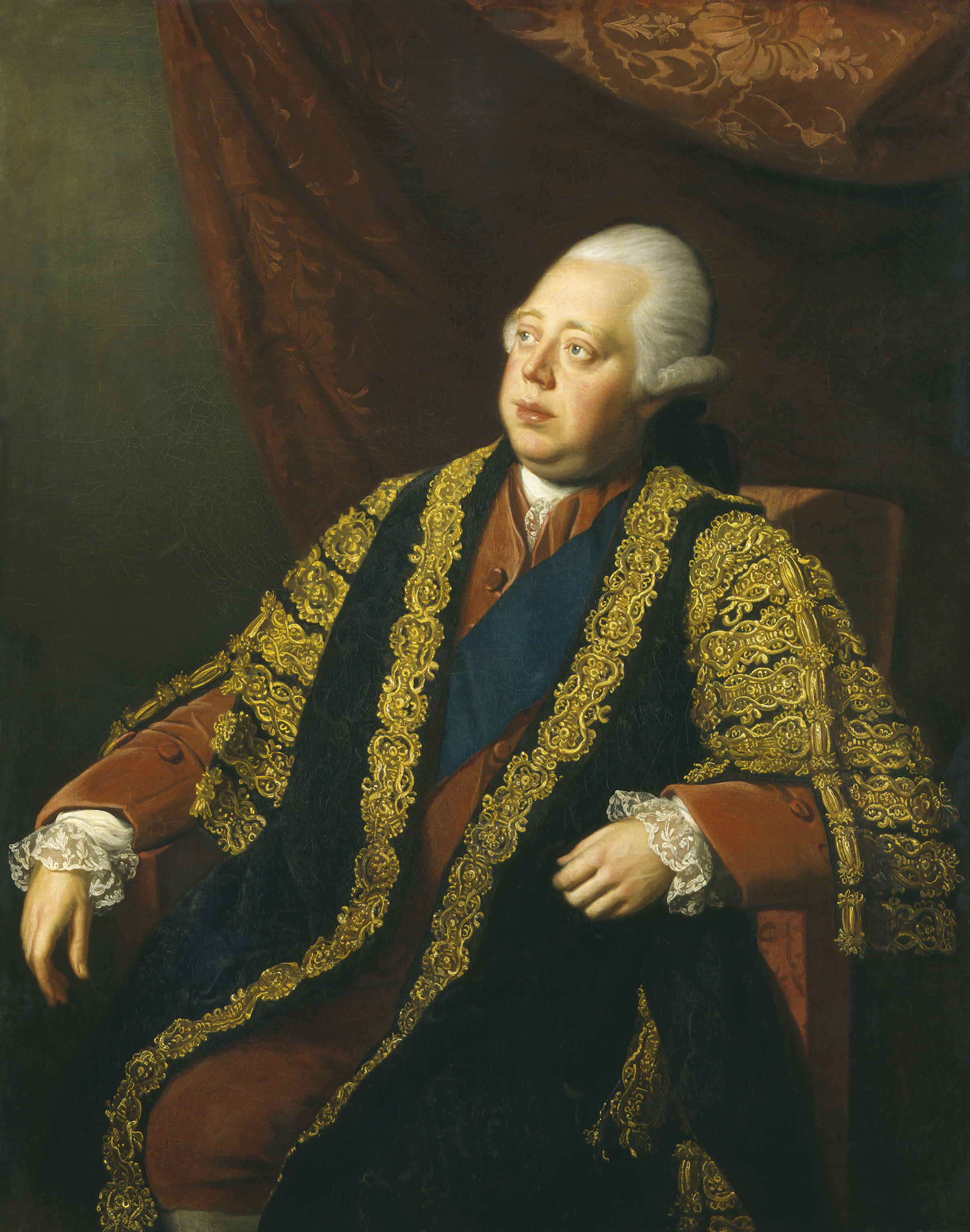
Lord North, 1773

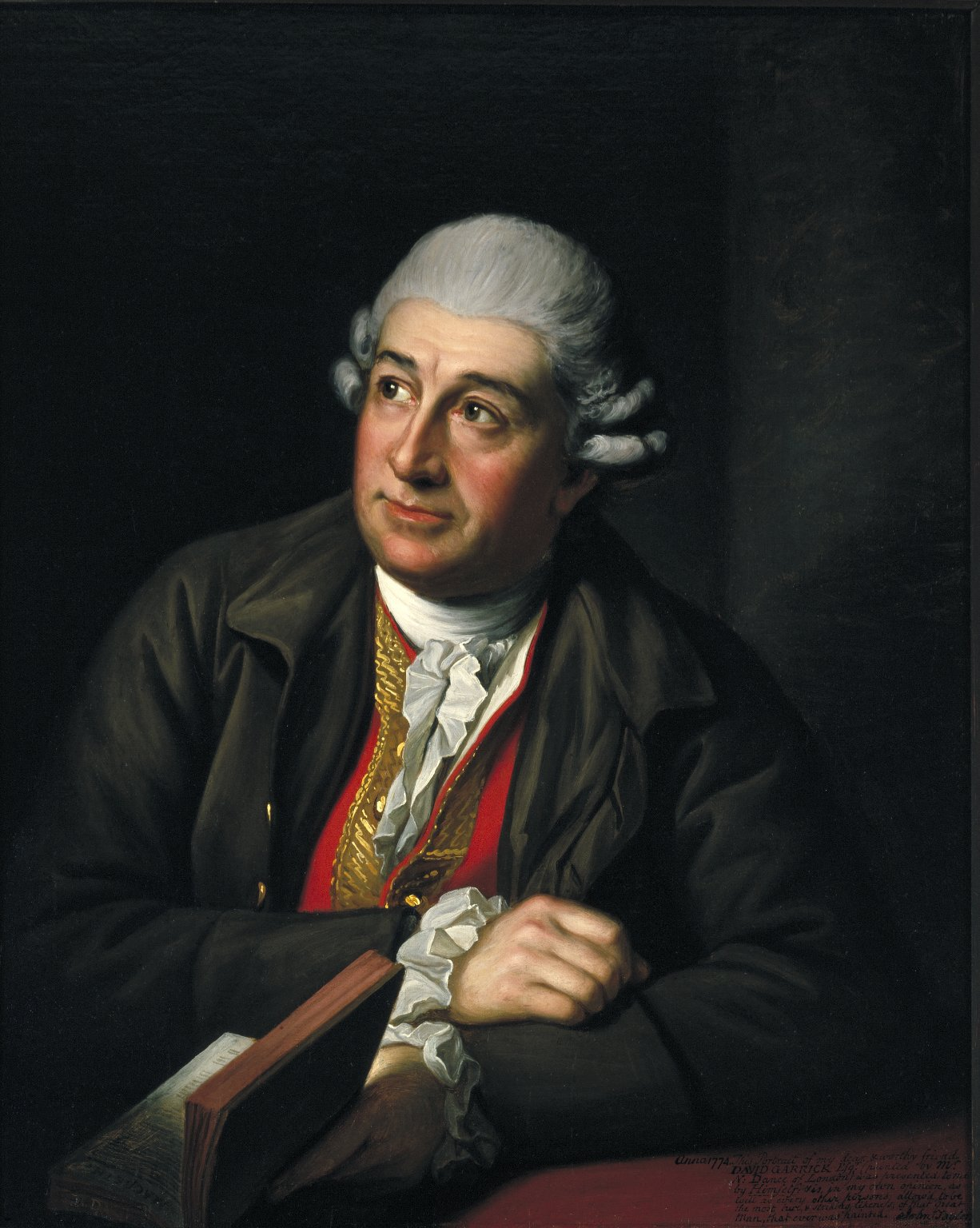
David Garrick, 1774

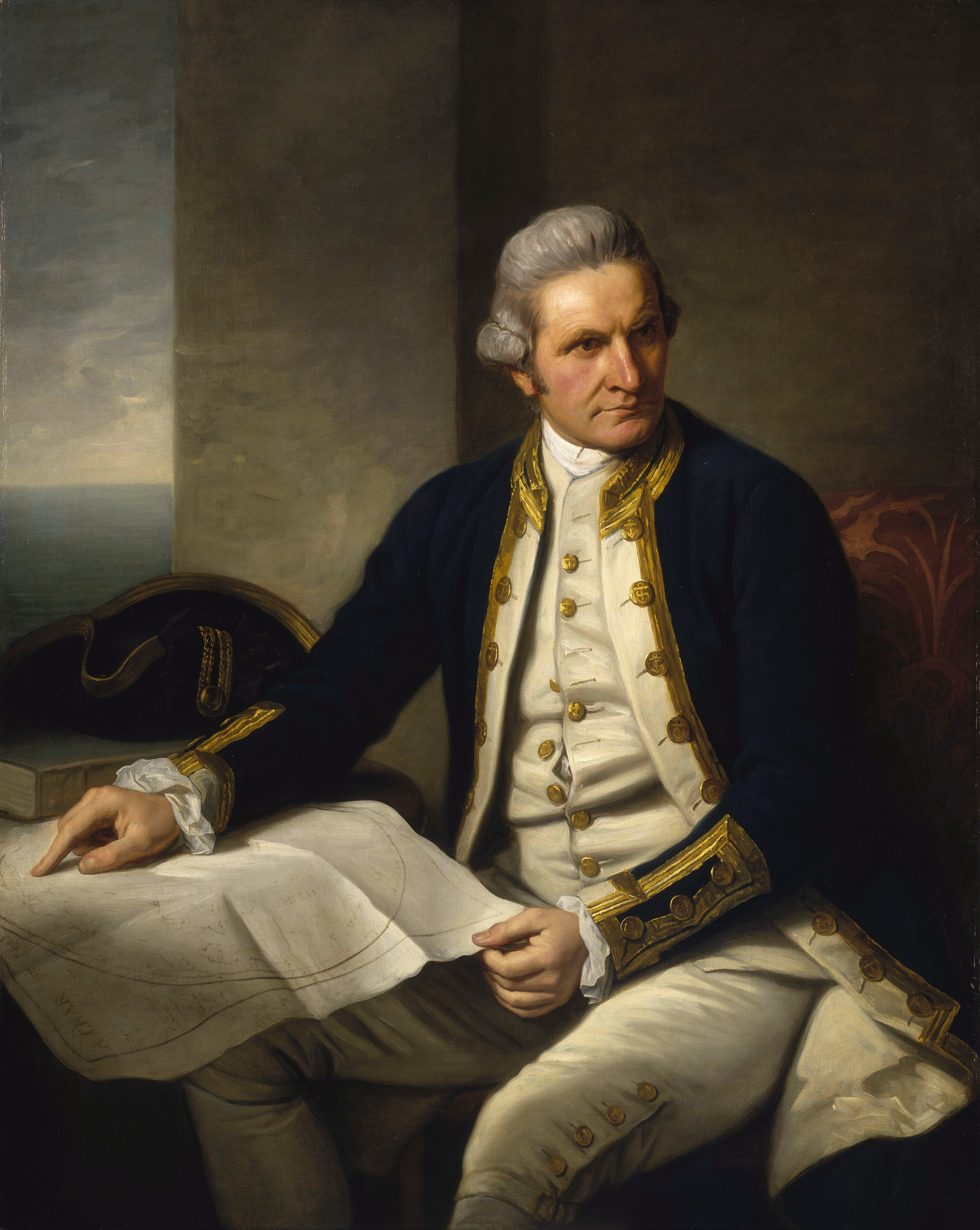
Portrait of James Cook, c. 1775

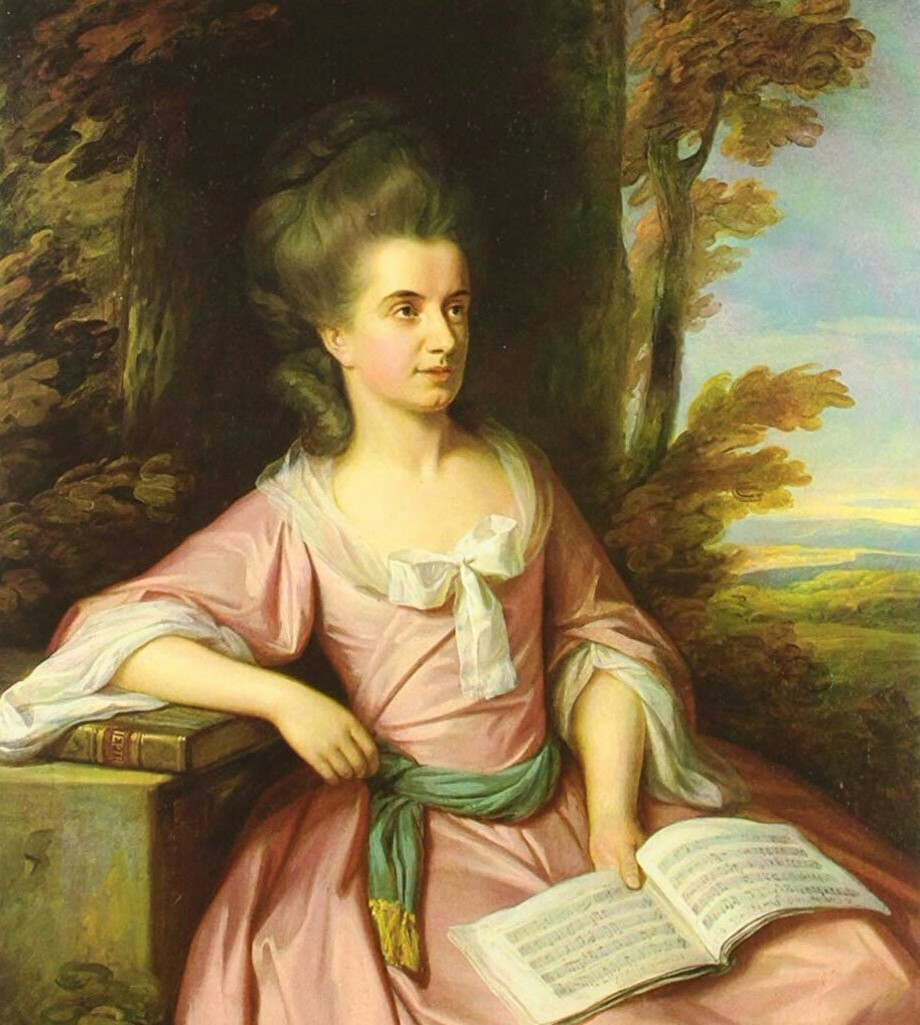
Martha Ray, 1777

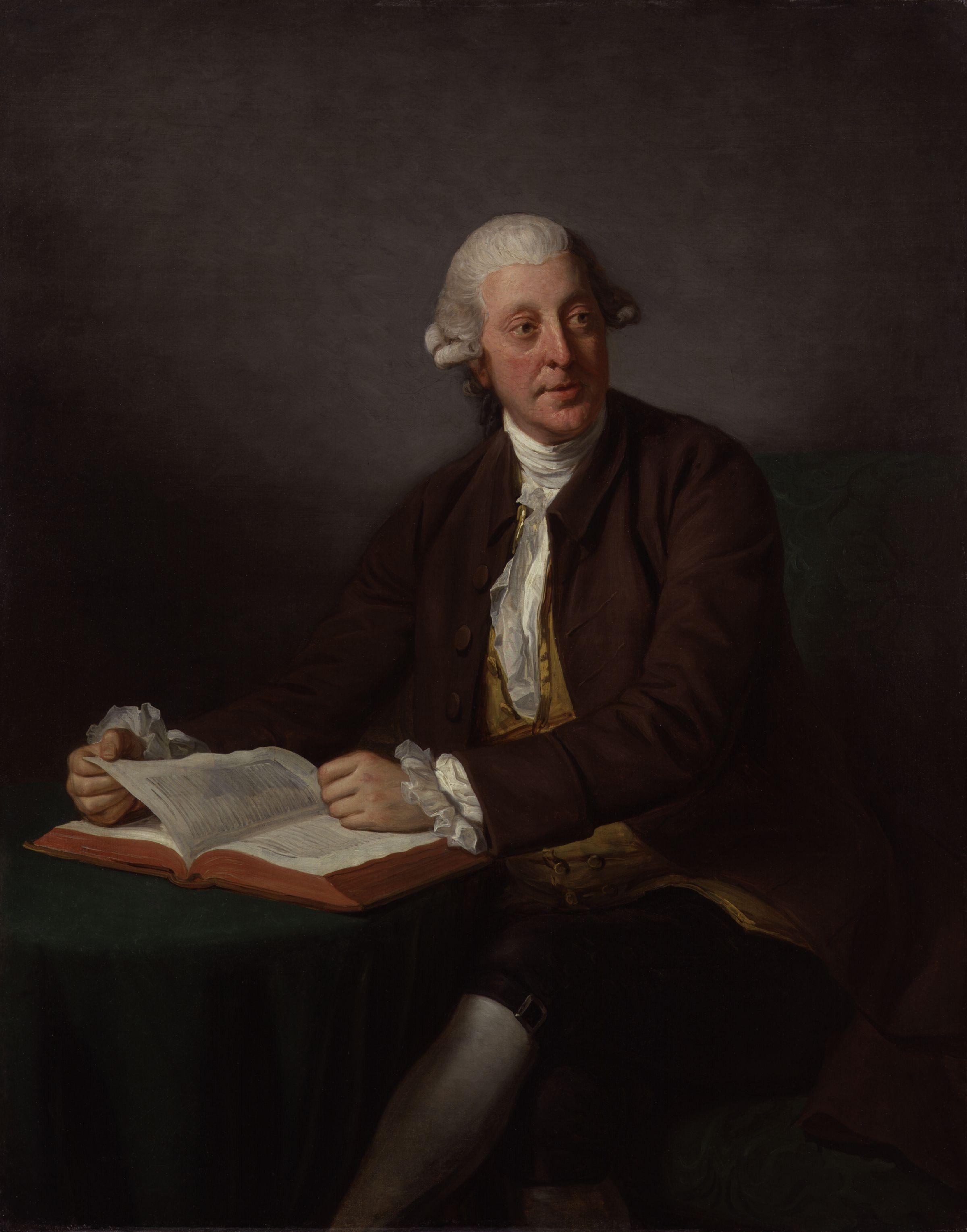
Portrait of Arthur Murphy, 1777

== Notes ==
Parliament of Great Britain
Preceded by Richard Ford; George Medley	Member of Parliament for East Grinstead; 1790–1800; With: William Hamilton Nisbet 1790–96; James Strange from 1796	Parliament of Great Britain abolished
Parliament of the United Kingdom
New parliament	Member of Parliament for East Grinstead; 1801–1802; With: James Strange	Succeeded by Sir Henry Strachey, Bt; Daniel Giles
Preceded by John Wodehouse; Sir Robert Buxton, Bt	Member of Parliament for Great Bedwyn; 1802–1806; With: Sir Robert Buxton, Bt	Succeeded by James Henry Leigh; Viscount Stopford
Preceded by Sir Henry Strachey, Bt; Daniel Giles	Member of Parliament for East Grinstead; 1807–1811; With: Charles Rose Ellis	Succeeded by Richard Wellesley; Charles Rose Ellis
Baronetage of Great Britain
New creation	Baronet (of Wittenham); 1800–1811	Extinct
Preceded by Elford baronets	Dance baronets of Wittenham; 27 November 1800	Succeeded by Milman baronets
