= Qian Du =

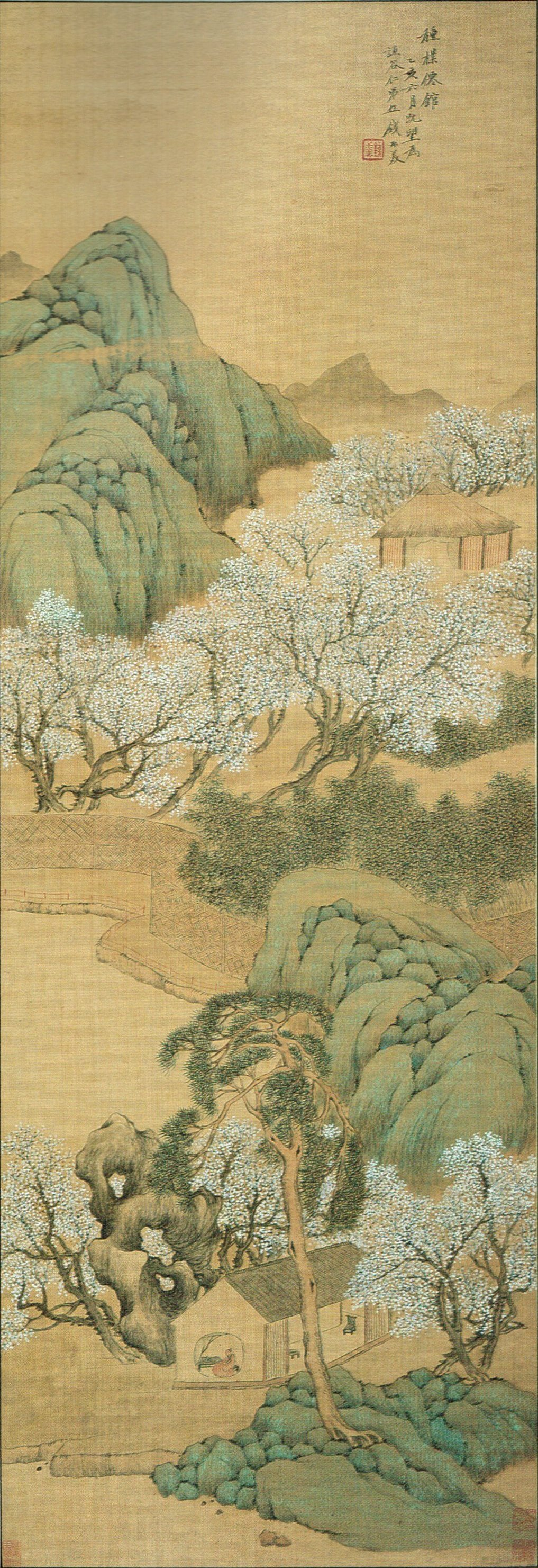
Cottage of the Cultivated Plum Trees, painting by Ch'ien Tu (Qian Du), 1815, Honolulu Museum of Art

Qian Du (Wade–Giles: Ch'ien Tu, traditional: 錢杜, simplified: 钱杜; pinyin: Qián Dù); c. 1764–1844 was a Chinese landscape painter during the Qing Dynasty (1644–1912).

Qian was born in the Zhejiang province. His style name was 'Shumei' and his sobriquets were 'Songhu, Songhu Xiaoyin and Hegong'. Qian painted landscapes in a style influenced by Wang Meng. He also painted human figures and flowers.
