= Portrait of David Garrick (Batoni) =

Painting by Pompeo Batoni

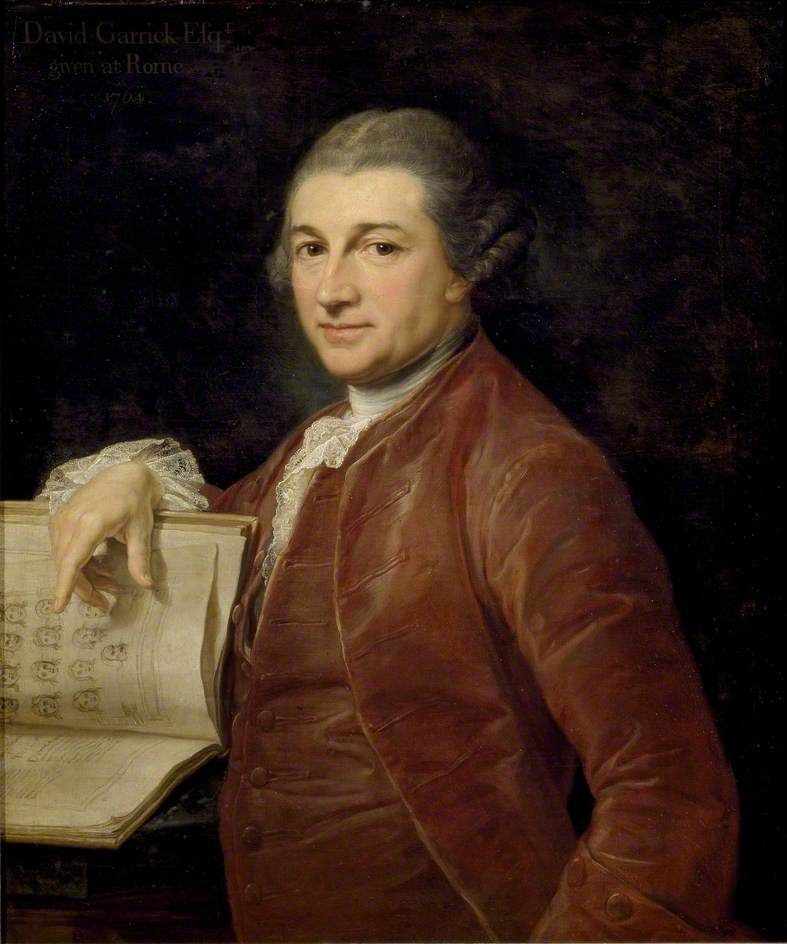
- Artist: Pompeo Batoni
- Year: 1764
- Type: Oil on canvas, portrait painting
- Dimensions: 76 cm × 63 cm (30 in × 25 in)
- Location: Ashmolean Museum; Oxford

Portrait of David Garrick is a 1764 portrait painting by the Italian artist Pompeo Batoni. It depicts the British stage actor David Garrick. It was produced in Rome during Garrick's visit to Italy from 1763 to 1765. Garrick is shown with a book featuring the Ancient Roman author Terence's Comedies. The painting was commissioned by Garrick for Richard Kaye to give in exchange for an ancient gem that Kaye had acquired at the Baths of Caracalla. It took twelve lengthy sittings by Garrick with Batoni, the most celebrated portraitist in Rome who was known for his depictions of visiting British Grand Tourists. Today it is in the Ashmolean Museum in Oxford, having been transferred from the Bodleian Library in 1845.

== Bibliography ==
- Bowron, Edgar Peters & Kerber, Peter Björn. Pompeo Batoni: Prince of Painters in Eighteenth-century Rome. Yale University Press, 2007.
- Ritchie, Leslie. David Garrick and the Mediation of Celebrity. Cambridge University Press, 2019.
