= Onorato Caetani =

Onorato Caetani may refer to:

- Onorato Caetani (died 1400), Neapolitan statesman, senator of Rome
- Onorato Caetani (1414–1491), Neapolitan statesman and art patron
- Onorato Caetani (died 1528), Neapolitan nobleman
- Onorato Caetani (1542–1592), Italian mercenary
- Onorato Caetani (1742–1797), Italian scholar and art patron
- Onorato Caetani (1842–1917), Italian politician, president of the Italian Geographical Society
