= Cupid and Ganymede =

1782 painting by Angelica Kauffman

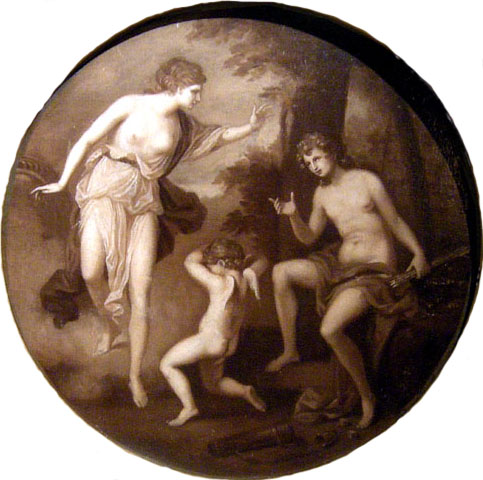
Cupid and Ganymede (1782) by Angelica Kauffman

Cupid and Ganymede or Venus Finds Cupid Playing Dice with Ganymede is a 1782 painting by Angelica Kauffman, one of four works commissioned from her by George Bowles It is now in a private collection. It is based on Matthew Pryor's poetic reworking of an ancient myth about how Ganymede beat Cupid at dice, with the stakes being Cupid's arrows, an attribute of his divine power, and shows Cupid being chastised by his mother Venus.

The work and Kauffman's Jupiter and Callisto and Orpheus and Eurydice were engraved by Thomas Burke in 1784. The artist also painted Ganymede and the Eagle (now in the vorarlberg Museum) in 1793.

== See also ==
- List of paintings by Angelica Kauffman
