= List of paintings by Angelica Kauffman =

A list of paintings by Angelica Kauffmann (1741–1807).

== Rome (1763–1766) ==
Image	Genre	Title	Date	Technique	Collection	Reference
	Portrait	Woman in Neapolitan Dress	1762–1764	oil on canvas	Saltram House, UK	Catalogue entry
	Biblical	Cumaean Sibyl (after Domenichino)	c. 1763	oil on canvas	National Museum of Women in the Arts, USA	Google Arts
	Religious	The Mystic Marriage of Saint Catherine (after Corregio)	1763–1764	oil on canvas	Private (stored at vorarlberg museum, Austria)	Catalogue entry
	Portrait	John Campbell, 4th Earl and 1st Marquess of Breadalbane (1762–1834)	1760s	oil on canvas	Private; Sold at Christie's 2011	Christie's catalogue entry
	Portrait	Portrait of Winckelmann	1764	oil on canvas	Kunsthaus Zürich, Switzerland	Catalogue entry
|	Mythological	Penelope at Her Loom	1764	oil on canvas	Brighton Museum and Art Gallery	
	Portrait	Portrait of David Garrick (1717–1779)	1764	oil on canvas	Burghley House, UK	Catalogue entry
	Portrait (self)	Self-Portrait as a Musician	c. 1764	oil on canvas	Saltram House, UK	Catalogue entry
	Portrait	John Parker, later 1st Baron Boringdon (1734 / 5-1788)	c. 1764	oil on canvas	Saltram House, UK	Catalogue entry
	Portrait	John Morgan (1735–1789)	1764	oil on canvas	National Portrait Gallery, Washington	Catalogue entry

== London (1766–1782) ==
Image	Genre	Title	Date	Technique	Collection	Reference
	Mythology	Jupiter Disguised as Diana Seducing Callisto	1766–1782	oil on canvas	private	
	Portrait	Mrs Hugh Morgan and Her Daughter	1766–1776	oil on canvas	Art Institute of Chicago, USA	Catalogue entry
	Portrait	Edmund Bastard (1758–1816) as a Child	c. 1766	oil on canvas	Saltram House, UK	Catalogue entry
	Portrait	Three Children, Probably Lady Georgiana Spencer, Lady Henrietta and George, Viscount Althrop	After 1766	oil on canvas	Private; Sold at Sotheby's 2019	Catalogue entry
	Portrait	Sir Joshua Reynolds (1723–1792)	1767	oil on canvas	Saltram House, UK	Catalogue entry
	Portrait	Augusta, Duchess of Brunswick, with her son	1767	oil on canvas	Royal Collection, UK	Catalogue entry
	Portrait	Woman in Turkish Dress	1767	oil on canvas	Saint Louis Art Museum	Catalogue entry
	Portrait (self)	Self-Portrait with a Drawing Crayon	c. 1768	oil on canvas	Private	Museum Kunstpalast
	Mythology	Hector Taking Leave of Andromache	Exhibited at the Society of Artists in 1768	oil on canvas	Saltram House, UK	Catalogue entry
	Mythology	Penelope Unstringing Ulysses's Bow	Exhibited at the Society of Artists in 1768	oil on canvas	Saltram House, UK	Catalogue entry
	Mythology	Venus Showing Aeneas and Achates the Way to Carthage	Exhibited at the Society of Artists in 1768	oil on canvas	Saltram House, UK	Catalogue entry
	Mythology	Ulysses Discovers Achilles	Exhibited at the Royal Academy in 1769	oil on canvas	Saltram House, UK	Catalogue entry
	History	Vortigern, King of England, in Love with Rowena at the Banquet of the Saxon General Hengist	Exhibited at the Royal Academy in 1770	oil on canvas	Saltram House, UK	Catalogue entry
	History	Cleopatra Decorating Mark Anthony's Tomb	1769–1770	oil on canvas	Burghley House, UK	Catalogue entry
	Portrait	Johann Heinrich Hampe (1693–1779)	c. 1770	oil on canvas	Gemäldegalerie (Berlin), Germany	Catalogue entry
	Mythology	Bacchante	c. 1770	oil on canvas	Siegerlandmuseum, Siegen, Germany	Catalogue entry
	Portrait	Elizabeth Kerr, née Fortescue; Marchioness of Lothian	c. 1770	oil on canvas	Clark Art Institute, Williamstown, USA	Catalogue entry Bonhams entry
	History	Meeting between Edgar and Elfrida after her Marriage to Athelwold	Exhibited at the Royal Academy in 1770–1771	oil on canvas	Saltram House, UK	Catalogue entry
	Portrait (self)	Self-Portrait	1770–1775	oil on canvas	National Portrait Gallery, UK	Catalogue entry
	Portrait	Sir John Cullum, 6th Baronet	1770–1775	oil on canvas	West Suffolk Heritage Service, UK	Museum entry VADS entry ArtUK entry
	Mythology	Orestes and Iphigenia at Tauris	1771	oil on canvas	Private; Sold at Sotheby's 2005	Invaluable entry
	History	Rinaldo and Armida	1771	oil on canvas	Yale Center for British Art, USA	Catalogue entry
	Portrait	The Ely Family	1771	oil on canvas	National Gallery of Ireland	
	Portrait	Anne Loudoun, Lady Henderson of Fordell	1771	oil on canvas	Angelika Kauffmann Museum, Austria	Catalogue entry
	Portrait	Philip Tisdall (1703–1777)	c. 1771	oil on canvas	Private; Sold at Dorotheum 2014	Dorotheum entry
	Portrait	Mary Tisdal Reading	1771–1772	oil on canvas	Joslyn Art Museum, USA	Catalogue entry
	Portrait	The Family of the Earl Gower	1772	oil on canvas	National Museum of Women in the Arts, USA	Catalogue entry
	Portrait	Jemima Ord Playing a Lyre in a Landscape	c. 1772	oil on canvas	Private; Sold at Christie's 2006	Invaluable entry Christie's entry
	Genre	Morning Amusement at the Embroiderers	1773	oil on canvas	Pushkin Museum, Russia	Akg Images
	Portrait	Frances Ann Acland, Lady Hoare (1735 / 6-1800)	c. 1773	oil on canvas	Stourhead, UK	Catalogue entry
	Religious	Madonna and Child	1774	oil on canvas	Neue Pinakothek, Germany	Catalogue entry
	Mythology	Penelope Sacrificing to Minerva for the Safe Return of her Son Telemachus	1774	oil on canvas	Stourhead, UK	Catalogue entry
	Mythology	Ariadne Abandoned by Theseus	1774	oil on canvas	Museum of Fine Arts, Houston, USA	Catalogue entry
	Portrait	Elizabeth Hartley	1774	oil on canvas	Garrick Club	
	Portrait	Lady Georgiana, Lady Henrietta Frances and George John Spencer, Viscount Althorp	1774	oil on canvas	Althorp Collection, UK	Catalogue entry
	Mythology	Sappho Inspired by Love	1775	oil on canvas	Private	Bridgeman Images
	Mythology	Hector Summoning Paris to Battle	1775	oil on canvas	Hermitage Museum, Russia	Catalogue entry
	Mythology	A Sibyl after Guercino	1775	oil on canvas	Private; Sold at Sotheby's 2014	Catalogue Sotheby's
	Mythology	Papirius Praetextatus Begged by his Mother to Reveal the Senate's Secret Deliberations	1775	oil on canvas	Denver Art Museum, USA	Catalogue entry
	Portrait	Lieutenant General James Cuningham	c. 1775	oil on canvas	Philadelphia Museum of Art, USA	Catalogue entry
	Portrait	Woman as a Vestal Virgin	after 1775	oil on canvas	Thyssen-Bornemisza Museum, Spain	Catalogue entry
	Mythology	Eleanor of Castille Sucking Poison from her Husband Edward's Wound	1776	oil on canvas	Private collection (stored at the vorarlberg museum, Austria)	Catalogue entry
	History	Armida in Vain Endeavours with Her Entreaties to Prevent Rinaldo's Departure	1776	Oil on canvas	Kenwood House, London	
	Portrait	Edward Smith-Stanley (12th Earl of Derby) (1752–1834) with his first wife Lady Elizabeth Hamilton (1753–1797) and their son Edward Smith Stanley (1775–1851)	c. 1776	oil on canvas	Metropolitan Museum, USA	Catalogue entry
	Portrait	John Simpson, Father of Maria Susanna Lady Ravensworth	1773	oil on canvas	Belvedere Gallery, Austria	Catalogue entry
	Portrait	John Simpson	c. 1777	oil on canvas	National Portrait Gallery, UK	Catalogue entry
	Genre	Maria Mad (pendant to The Monk of Calais)	after 1777	oil on canvas	Hermitage Museum, Russia	Museum
	Genre	The Monk of Calais pendant to Maria Mad	after 1777	oil on canvas	Hermitage Museum, Russia	Catalogue entry
	Allegory	Immortality; Possibly the version exhibited at the Royal Academy	1778	oil on canvas	Private; Sold at Dreweatts 2010	Invaluable entry
	Mythology	Zeuxis Selecting Models for His Painting of Helen of Troy	1778 (conjectural date)	oil on canvas	Providence, Brown University	Utpictura18
	Allegory	Colour from a series of four paintings representing the Elements of Art	1778–1780	oil on canvas	Royal Academy, London	Académie
	Portrait	William Heberden as a Boy (1767–1845)	1779	oil on canvas	Private; Sold at Sotheby's 2019	Catalogue Sotheby's
	Mythology	Calypso Calling Heaven and Earth to Witness to her Sincere Affection for Ulysses	c. 1779	oil on canvas	Private; Sold at Christie's 2007	Catalogue Christie's
	Allegory	Conjugal Peace	c. 1779	oil on canvas	Private; Sold at Dorotheum 2019	Catalogue entry
	History	The Parting of Abelard and Heloise	before 1780	oil on canvas	Hermitage Museum, Russia	Catalogue entry
	Portrait	Portrait of a Young Woman	1781	oil on canvas	Goethe House, Germany	Catalogue entry
	History	Judgement of Paris	c. 1781	oil on canvas	Ponce Art Museum, Porto Rico	Catalogue entry
	Mythology	Diana and Her Nymphs Bathing	1778–1782	oil on canvas	Art Gallery of South Australia, Australia	Catalogue entry
	History	Cimon and Iphigenia	c. 1780	oil on canvas	Gibbes Museum of Art, USA	Catalogue entry
	Allegory	Guided by Reason, Beauty Resists the Temptations of Folly	c. 1780	oil on canvas	Estonian Art Museum, Estonia	Catalogue entry
	Allegory	Beauty Guided by Prudence and Crowned by Perfection	c. 1780	oil on canvas	Estonian Museum of Art, Estonia	Catalogue entry
	Portrait	Unknown Woman, Traditionally Identified as Lady Hervey	c. 1770	oil on canvas	Yale Center for British Art, USA	Catalogue entry
	Portrait	Unknown Man, Called Sir Robert Hervey	c. 1780	oil on canvas	Yale Center for British Art, USA	
	Mythology	Nymph Drawing her Bow upon a Young Man	c. 1780	oil on copper	Victoria and Albert Museum, UK	Catalogue entry
	Mythology	Sleeping Nymph Observed by a Shepherd	c. 1780	oil on copper	Victoria and Albert Museum, UK	Catalogue entry
	Portrait	Susanna, Lady Cullum, wife of Sir John Cullum, 5th Baronet and mother of Sir John Cullum, 6th Baronet	c.1780	oil on canvas	West Suffolk Heritage Service, UK	ArtUK entry
	Portrait (self)	Self-Portrait	1780–1785	oil on canvas	Hermitage Museum, Russia	Catalogue entry
	Portrait (self)	Self-Portrait in the Traditional Costume of Bregenzerwald	1781	oil on canvas	Tyrolean Folk Art Museum, Switzerland	
	Portrait	Portrait of a Woman as a Sibyl	1781–1782	oil on canvas	Gemäldegalerie Alte Meister, Germany	Catalogue entry
	Portrait or Portrait (self)	Portrait of a Woman as a Vestal Virgin or Self-Portrait as a Vestal virgin	1781–1782	oil on canvas	Gemäldegalerie Alte Meister, Germany	Catalogue entry
	Mythology	Ariadne Abandoned	before 1782	oil on canvas	Gemäldegalerie Alte Meister, Germany	Catalogue entry
	Portrait	Eleanor, Countess of Lauderdale	1780–1781	oil on canvas	Museum of Fine Arts, Houston, USA	Catalogue entry
	Portrait	The Soprano Sarah Harrop (Mrs Bates) as a Muse	1780–1781	oil on canvas	Princeton University Art Museum, USA	Catalogue entry
	Portrait	Mary Walsh, Mrs Ralph Clavering	1780–1785	oil on canvas	Oxburgh Hall, UK	Catalogue entry

== Rome (1782 onwards) ==
Image	Thème	Title	Date	Technique	Collection	Reference
	Mythology	Cupid and Ganymede	1782	oil on canvas	private	
	History	Telemachus and the Nymphs of Calypso	1782	oil on canvas	Metropolitan Museum, USA	Catalogue entry
	History	The Sorrow of Telemachus	1782	oil on canvas	Metropolitan Museum, USA	Catalogue entry
	Portrait	Johann Friedrich Reiffenstein (1719–1793)	1782–1793	oil on canvas	Private; Sold at Sotheby's 2017	Catalogue entry
	History	Cephissus and His Lover Discover Cupid Sleeping in the Forest of Idalia	1782	oil on canvas	Gemäldegalerie, Germany	Catalogue entry
	History	Cephissus Cutting the Sleeping Cupid's Wings	1782	oil on canvas	Gemäldegalerie, Germany	Catalogue entry
	Allegory	The Artist in the Character of Design Listening to the Inspiration of Poetry	1782	oil on canvas	Kenwood House, UK	ArtUK entry
	History	Miranda and Ferdinand from Shakespeare's The Tempest	1782	oil on canvas	Österreichische Galerie Belvedere, Austria	Catalogue entry
	Portrait	Portrait of the Family of King Ferdinand IV	1782–1783	oil on canvas	Museo di Capodimonte, Italy	Beniculturali entry
	Portrait	Maria Wirtemberska née Czartoryska	1782–1783	oil on canvas	Łańcut Castle, Poland	historia poszukaj
	Mythology	Immortalia, the Nymph of Immortality, Receiving the Lists of Names from Two Swans (pendant to Sylvia)	c. 1783	oil on canvas	Private; Sold at Dorotheum 2019	Dorotheum entry
	Mythology	Daphne looking at Silvia Adorning Herself with Flowers, pendant to Immortalia	c. 1783	oil on canvas	Private; Sold at Dorotheum 2019	Dorotheum entry
	Portrait	Portrait of Krystyna Potocka Watering Flowers on her Mother's Tomb	1783–1784	oil on canvas	Wilanów Palace, Poland	Beniculturali entry
	Portrait (self)	Self-Portrait	1784	oil on canvas	Neue Pinakothek, Germany	Catalogue entry
	Portrait	The Duke of Chiesi, Son of Livio Erba-Odascalchi, Duke of Bracciano, and Vittoria Corsini	1784	oil on canvas	Private; Sold at Sotheby's 2008	Sotheby's entry
	Portrait (self)	Self-Portrait with a Bust of Minerva	c. 1784	oil on canvas	Bündner Kunstmuseum, Chur, Switzerland	Catalogue entry
	History	Virgil Writing His Epitaph at Brindisi	1785	oil on canvas	Carnegie Museum of Art, USA	Catalogue entry
	Mythology	Ceres	1785	oil on canvas	Private, stored at vorarlberg museum, Austria	Catalogue entry
	Portrait	Portrait, Said to be of Karl Leberecht	1785	oil on canvas	Hermitage Museum, Russia	Catalogue entry
	History	Pliny the Younger and His Mother at Misenum	1785	oil on canvas	Princeton University Art Museum, USA	Catalogue entry
	Portrait	Young Woman, Possibly Anna Charlotta Dorothea von Medem, Duchess of Courland (1761–1821)	1785	oil on canvas	Private; Sold at Sotheby's 2009	Sotheby's entry
	History	Cornelia, Mother of the Gracchi Pointing to her Children as her Treasures	c. 1785	oil on canvas	Virginia Museum of Fine Arts, USA	Catalogue entry
	Portrait	Lady Elizabeth Christiana Hervey, Lady Elizabeth Foster, later Duchess of Devonshire (1759–1824)	1785–1787	oil on canvas	Ickworth, Suffolk	Catalogue entry
	Portrait	Countess Lucia Memmo Mocenigo (1770–1854)	1786	oil on canvas	Private; Sold at Christie's 2013	Christie's entry
	Portrait	Barbara Juliane von Wietinghoff, Baroness of Krüdener (1764–1824) and Her Son Paul Aged Two	1786	oil on canvas	Musée du Louvre, France	Catalogue entry
	Portrait	Count Paul Martinovich Skavronsky	1786	oil on canvas	Pushkin Museum, Russia	Catalogue entry
	Portrait	Prince Henryk Lubomirski as Cupid	1786	oil on canvas	Lviv Art Gallery, Ukraine	Bridgeman entry
	History	Ulysses and Circe	1786	oil on canvas	University of Virginia, USA	Utpictura18 entry
	Mythology	Ulysses Discovers Achilles among the Daughter of King Lycomedes	1786–1789	oil on paper glued to canvas	National Gallery of Finland	Catalogue entry
	Portrait (self)	Self-Portrait	1787	oil on canvas	Hatchlands Park, UK	Catalogue entry
	Portrait (self)	Self-Portrait as the Muse of Painting	1787	oil on canvas	Vasari Corridor, Uffizi, Italy	Web Gallery entry
	Portrait	Johann Wolfgang von Goethe	1787	oil on canvas	Goethe-Nationalmuseum, Germany	Catalogue entry
	Portrait	Joseph Johann Count Fries	1787	oil on canvas	Vienna Museum, Austria	Google Arts entry
	History	Virgil Reading the Aeneid to Augustus and Octavia	1788	oil on canvas	Hermitage Museum, Russia	Catalogue entry
	Portrait	Portrait of Countess Anna Protasova with Her Nieces	1788	oil on canvas	Hermitage Museum, Russia	Catalogue entry
	Literature	Valentine, Proteus, Sylvia and Julia in the Forest (Scene from The Two Gentlemen of Verona)	1788	oil on canvas	Davis Museum, Wellesley College, USA	Google Arts entry
	History	Diomedes and Cressida, from Shakespeare's Troilus and Cressida, Act V, Scene II	1789	oil on canvas	Petworth House, UK	Catalogue entry
	Portrait	The Duchess of Saxe-Weimar-Eisenach	1789	oil on canvas	Weimar, Klassik Stiftung	AKResearch Catalogue entry
	Portrait	Countess Catherine Skavronska	1789	oil on canvas	Germanisches Nationalmuseum, Germany	Catalogue entry
	Mythology	Venus Persuading Helen to Love Paris	1790	oil on canvas	Hermitage Museum, Russia	Catalogue entry
	Mythology	Flora	1790	oil on canvas	Private, stored at vorarlberg museum, Austria	Catalogue entry
	Portrait	Anna Maria Jenkins and Thomas Jenkins	1790	oil on canvas	National Portrait Gallery, UK	Catalogue entry
	Portrait	Marie Thérèse, Countess Meerfeld, née Countess Dietrichstein	c, 1790	oil on canvas	Österreichische Galerie Belvedere, Austria	Catalogue entry
	Portrait	Possibly Franciszka Krasińska, Duchess of Courlande	c. 1790	oil on canvas	National Gallery of Art, USA	Catalogue entry
	Portrait	Captain Thomas Read (1762–1837)	c. 1790	oil on canvas	Osterley Park and House, UK	Catalogue entry
	Portrait	Thomas Reade	c. 1790	oil on canvas	Private	Invaluable entry
	Religious	Saint Joachim	Before 1791	oil on canvas	vorarlberg museum, Austria	Catalogue entry
	Portrait	Domenica Morghen as the Muse of Tragedy and Maddalena Volpato as the Muse of Comedy or Tragedy and Comedy	1791	oil on canvas	National Museum of Warsaw, Poland	
	Portrait	Giovanni Volpato	1790–1799	oil on canvas	Private	Artnet entry
	Portrait	Domenica Volpato, Daughter of the Engraver Giovanni Volpato	1791	oil on canvas	Museo Borgogna, Verceil, Italy	Catalogue entry
	Portrait	Portrait of Helena née Stadnicka as a Vestal Virgin	c. 1791	oil on canvas	National Museum of Warsaw	Instagram
	Portrait	Portrait of Princess Giuliana Pubblicola Santacroce as Lucretia	1791	oil on canvas	Łazienki Palace, Poland	Catalogue entry
	Mythology	Cupid and Psyche	1792	oil on canvas	Kunsthaus Zürich, Switzerland	Catalogue entry
	Allegory and Portrait (self)	Self-portrait Choosing Between Music and Painting (first version)	1792	oil on canvas	Pushkin Museum, Russia	Akg Images
	Portrait	Baron Gustaf Adolf Reuterholm	1792	oil on canvas	Nationalmuseum, Sweden	Catalogue entry
	Portrait	Thomas Noel-Hill, 2nd Baron Berwick of Attingham (1770–1832)	1793	oil on canvas	Attingham Park, UK	Catalogue entry
	Portrait	Georgiana, Duchess of Devonshire	1793	oil on canvas	Stansted Park, UK	
	History	Agrippina Weeping Over the Urn of Germanicus	1793	oil on canvas	Museum Kunstpalast, Düsseldorf, Germany, stored at vorarlberg museum, Austria	Catalogue entry
	Portrait	Comtesse Anna Aleksandrovna Chernysheva and her Daughter Ekaterina Ivanovna Vadkovskaya with a Marble Bust of Ekaterina's Father I.G. Tchernyshev	1793	oil on canvas	State Historical Museum, Russia	
	Portrait	Ellis Cornelia Knight, Member of the Royal Swedish Academy of Fine Arts	1793	oil on canvas	Manchester Art Gallery, UK	ArtUK entry
	Mythology	Euphrosyne Complaining to Venus About Being Wounded by Cupid's Arrow	1793 (exhibited at the Royal Academy in 1796)	oil on canvas	Attingham Park, UK	Catalogue entry
	Allegory and Portrait (self)	Self-Portrait of the Artist Hesitating Between Art and Music (second version)	1794	oil on canvas	Nostell Priory, UK	Catalogue entry
	Mythology	Bacchus and Ariadne	1794	oil on canvas	Attingham Park, UK	Catalogue entry
	Portrait	Portrait of the Impromptu Virtuoso Teresa Bandettini Landucci of Lucca (1763–1837)	1794	oil on canvas	Museum Kunstpalast, Düsseldorf, Germany	Catalogue entry
	Portrait	Phryne Seduces the Philosopher Xenocrates	1794	oil on canvas	Private; Sold at Christie's 2002	Christie's entry
	Portrait	Praxiteles Giving Phryne his Statue of Cupid	1794	oil on canvas	Rhode Island School of Design Museum, USA	Catalogue entry
	History	Egeria Returning Numa Pompilius's Shield to Him	1794	oil on canvas	Private; Sold at Christie's 2002	Christie's entry
	History	Pyrrhus as a Child Begging for Asylum from King Glaucias	1795	oil on canvas	Budapest Museum of Fine Arts, Hungary	Catalogue entry
	Portrait	Three Women Singing	1795	oil on canvas	Bündner Kunstmuseum, Chur, Switzerland	Catalogue entry
	Portrait	Portrait of a Woman at her Toilette	1795	oil on canvas	Budapest Museum of Fine Arts, Hungary	Catalogue entry
	Religious	Christ and the Samaritan Woman at the Well	1796	oil on canvas	Neue Pinakothek, Munich, Germany	Catalogue entry
	Portrait	Louise of Brandebourg-Schwedt, Duchess of Anhalt-Dessau	1796	oil on canvas	Kulturstiftung Dessau-Wörlitz, Dessau-Roßlau, Germany	Catalogue entry
	Portrait	Monsignor Giuseppe Spina (1756–1828)	1798	oil on canvas	Metropolitan Museum of Art, USA	Catalogue entry
	Portrait	Portrait of Augustin de Lespinasse (1737–1816)	1798	oil on canvas	Musée de l'Armée, France	
	Allegory	Christian Allegory	1798	oil on canvas	Musée des beaux-arts de Brest	Catalogue entry
	Portrait	Portrait of Henri Reboul	1798-1799	oil on canvas	Private collection, Reboul family	
	Portrait	Anna Escher von Muralt	c. 1800	oil on canvas	Prado Museum, Spain	Catalogue entry
	Portrait	Bearded Man in a Turban Looking Up or Head of a Turk	c. 1800	oil on canvas	vorarlberg museum, Austria	Catalogue entry
	Portrait	Old Bearded Man at Prayer	c. 1800	oil on canvas	vorarlberg museum, Austria	Catalogue entry
	Portrait	Wojciech Męciński	c. 1800	oil on canvas	National Museum of Warsaw, Poland	Catalogue entry
	Portrait (self)	Self-Portrait	c. 1802	oil on canvas	Angelika Kauffmann Museum, Austria	Catalogue entry
	Portrait	Princess Franziska von Kaunitz-Rietberg (née Ungnad), Countess of Weissenwolff (1773–1859)	1805	oil on canvas	Private; Sold 2012	Mutualart entry
	Portrait	Portrait of Ludwig, Crown Prince of Bavaria	1807	oil on canvas	Neue Pinakothek, Munich, Germany	Catalogue entry

== Undated ==
Image	Genre	Title	Technique	Collection	Reference
	Biblical	Jephthah and his Daughter	oil on stone	Hermitage Museum, Russia	Catalogue entry
	Mythology	Theseus and Ariadne	oil on canvas	Private; Sold at Dorotheum 2020	Dorotheum entry
	Portrait	Antonio Pietro Zucchi (1726–1795) the artist's husband	oil on canvas	Private; Sold at Christie's 2008	Christie's entry
	Portrait	Stanisław Poniatowski (1754–1833)	oil on canvas	Society of Friends of the Sciences, Poznań, Poland	Library entry
	Mythology	Flora	oil on canvas	Private; Sold at Sotheby's 2018	Sotheby's entry
	Portrait	Barbara St. John Bletsoe, Countess of Coventry	oil on canvas	Princeton University Art Museum, USA	Catalogue entry
	Portrait	Robert Stearne Tighe (1760–1835) of Mitchellstown, Westmeath and his wife Catherine	oil on canvas	Private; Sold at Mutualart 2020	Mutualart entry
