= Ariadne Abandoned by Theseus =

1774 painting by Angelica Kauffman

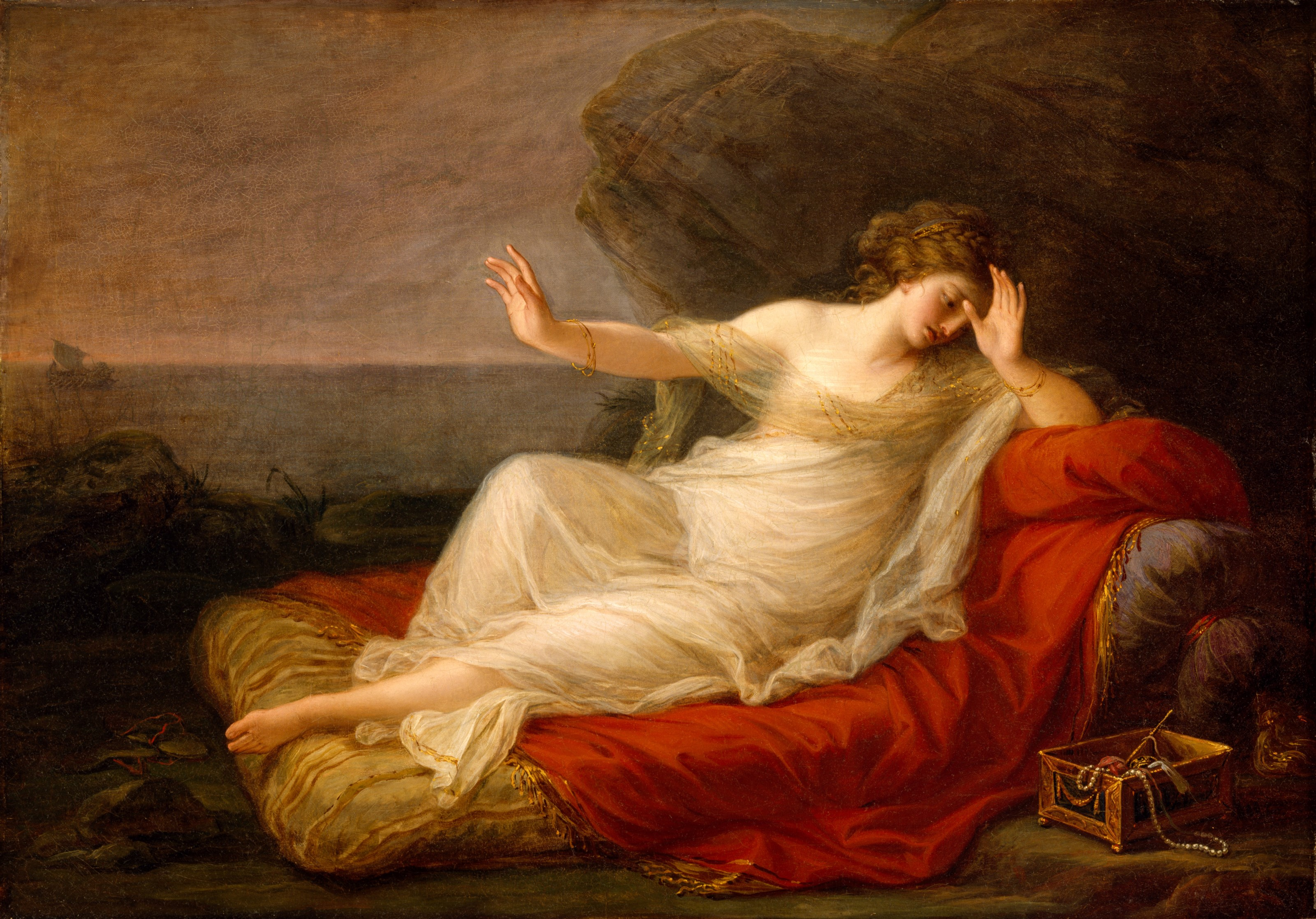
- Artist: Angelica Kauffman
- Year: 1774
- Medium: oil on canvas
- Dimensions: 63.8 cm × 90.9 cm (25.1 in × 35.8 in)
- Location: Museum of Fine Arts, Houston

Ariadne Abandoned by Theseus is an oil-on-canvas painting by the Swiss artist Angelica Kauffman. It was painted in England in 1774. It is displayed in the Museum of Fine Arts, in Houston, Texas, as a gift from Mr. and Mrs. Harris Masterson III. It is an oil painting on canvas. Ariadne Abandoned by Theseus is one of Kauffman's few history paintings depicting a single figure.

== Creation and early history ==
Angelica Kauffman was recognized to have talent in her youth and her father encouraged her development in painting and education in Italy. She lived in England for 15 years, where she was highly regarded and sought after. Kauffman was one of two women founders of the British Royal Academy of Arts. She painted Ariadne Abandoned by Theseus during her time at the English court when she was an annual exhibitor with the Royal Academy between 1769 and 1782. This painting was exhibited at the Royal Academy Summer Exhibition in 1774 with two other works of Kauffman's; Calypso Assenting to the Departure of Ulysses and Penelope Invoking Minerva's Aid for the Safe Return of Telemachus. All three of these paintings depict women in the absence of their lovers, or in the case of Penelope, her son. After Ariadne Abandoned by Theseus was exhibited, it was purchased by George Bowles, one of Kauffman's greatest supporters. It is unknown whether he commissioned the work or solely purchased it after exhibition.

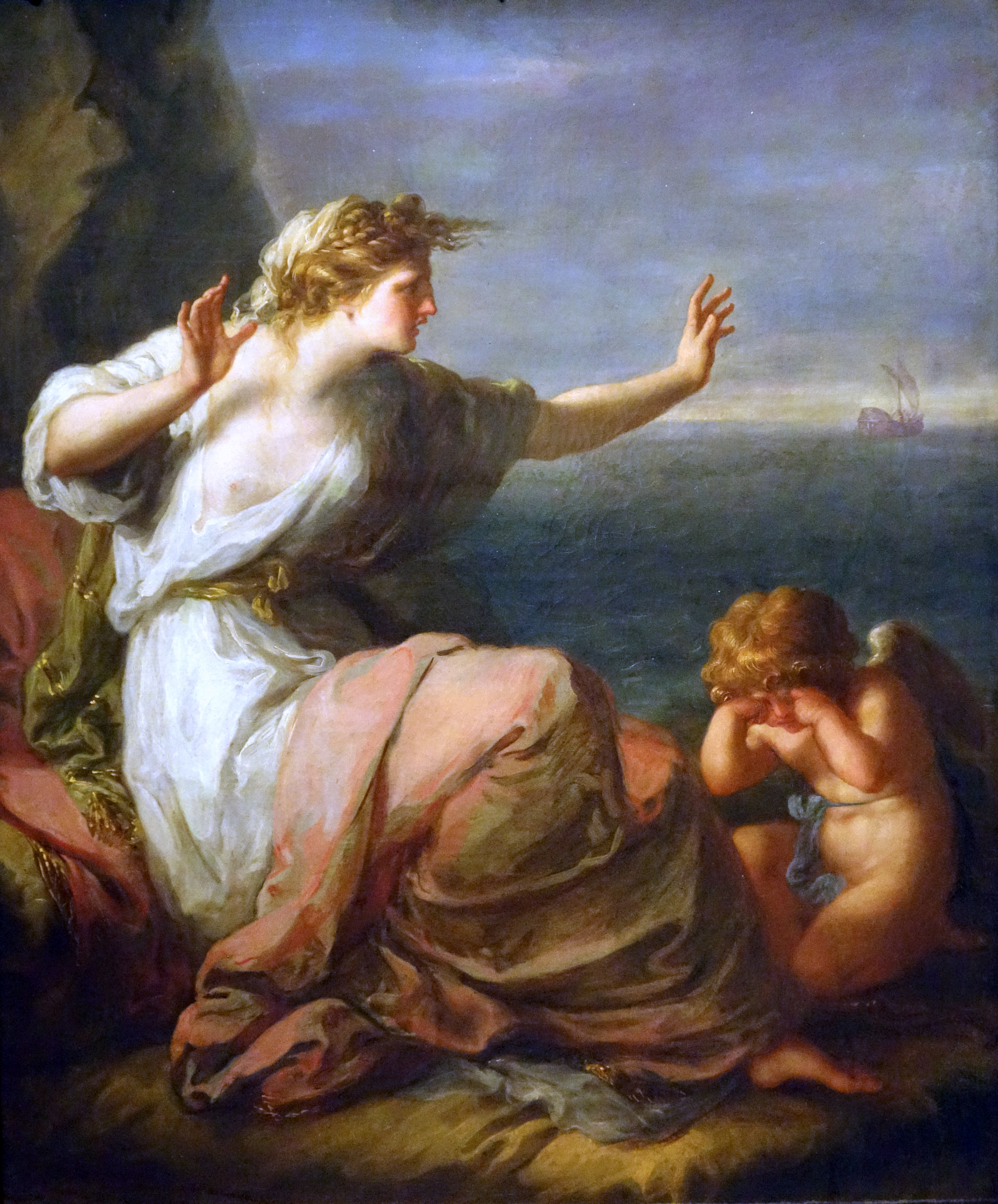
Die verlassene Ariadne - The Abandoned Ariadne (before 1782), 88 cm x 70.5 cm, oil on canvas (Staatliche Kunstsammlungen Dresden)

Angelica Kauffman was a leading Neoclassical painter in the 18th century in Europe and is credited with popularizing the Neoclassical style in England. During her time in England, she began to adapt her style to include more romantic elements, including vibrant colors, more emotion in the subjects, and overall less rigidity. She became well known for her use of rich colors, specifically the use of Venetian red. This pigment is a warm and darker shade of red frequently used in Italian Renaissance paintings.

Critics at the time regarded Kauffman highly, especially in portraying "artistic spirit". Praise was given to her use of rich color, transparent brushwork, choice of subject, and composition. A review of the Royal Academy Exhibition of 1769 states that Kauffman has an "uncommon genius and merit." Though after her time, critics often overlooked her gentle technique and approach to these subjects in favor of more heroic and solemn pieces.

== Description ==
Ariadne Abandoned by Theseus is on oil painting on canvas. The painting is signed and dated in the lower left. It is 63.8cm x 90.9cm. Ariadne Abandoned by Theseus is a history painting as it depicts a subject from literature. Kauffman is considered the first woman painter to take on these subjects, as they were done exclusively by men beforehand. Many academics at the time were open about their dislike of her gender in relation to being a history painter. Many of Kauffman's history paintings feature heroines. This painting is specifically a mythological painting, which is a work of art depicting a myth or scene from a myth. Ariadne is shown draped in sheer white fabric, lounged on a low cushion bed with a vibrant red blanket with gold tassels underneath her. She is reclined with one leg stretching out over the edge of the mattress with her bare foot over the edge of the cushion, while her other leg is bent and completely covered with her knee towards the sky. Her head is turned downward behind her raised hand and her back is to the sea. Ariadne's face is a picture of despair with one hand reaching out and the other shielding her face. Her hair in up with a braid across the top her head. A gold bracelet adorns each arm. In the background to the left, Theseus's ship is seen with its sail up and heading towards the soft pink horizon. On the right, directly behind Ariadne, is a large rock that obstructs the view of the sea in the background. The ground surrounding her is composed of dirt and grasses and her sandals are strewn on the ground at the end of the cushion. There is a box of jewels near Ariadne in the foreground, with a necklace falling out of it. Ariadne is alone in her despair. Sarah Wadstrom, in her masters thesis, compares Ariadne's pose to a woman's pose reacting to the massacre of Agamemnon in plate 148 of Winckelmann's Monumenti antichi inediti, the Death of Agamemnon. Connections are drawn to Ariadne's pose of despair in reaction to the massacre of her love with Theseus.

There are a variety of textures present in the painting done by means of brushstroke technique. The landscape has more visible brushstrokes, whereas Ariadne's skin is smooth and almost textureless.

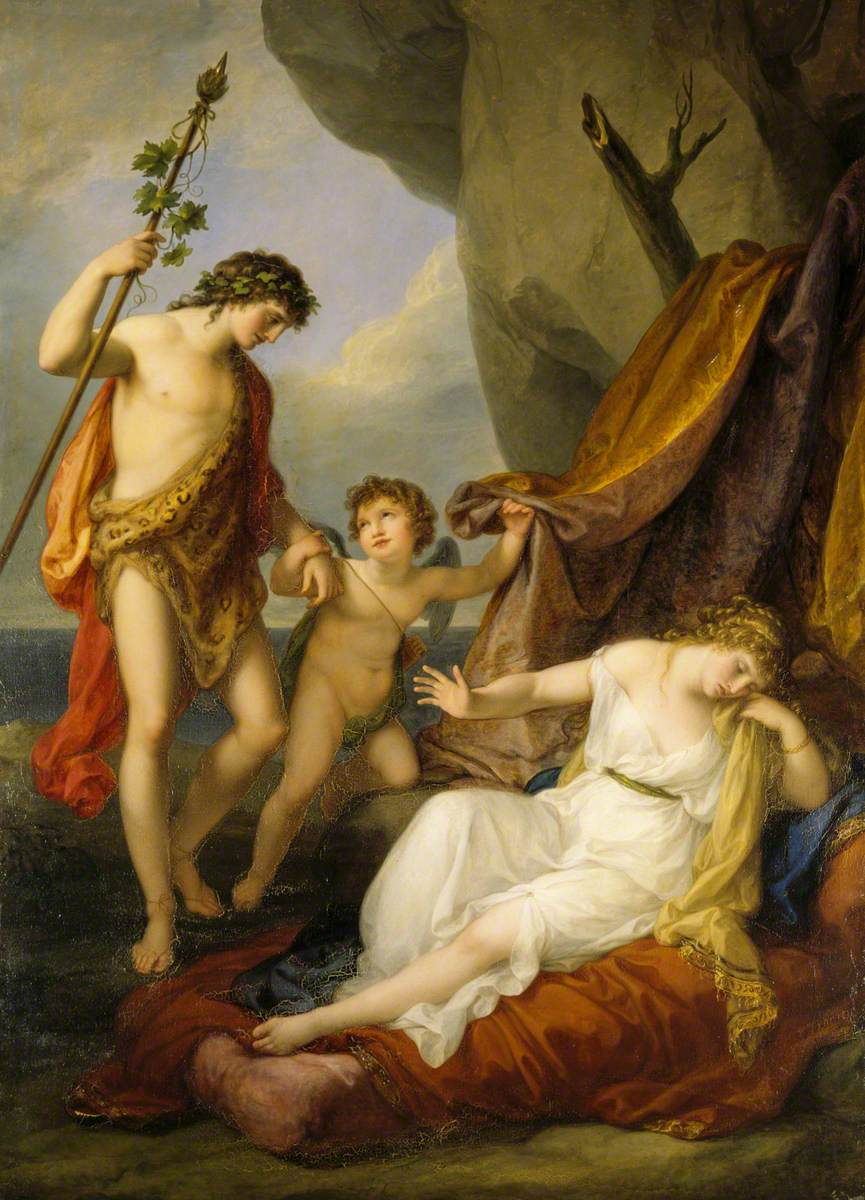
Ariadne Abandoned by Theseus, Discovered by Bacchus (Bacchus and Ariadne) (1794), 246 cm x 165 cm, oil on canvas

Angelica painted this subject another time before 1782. Titled Ariadne von Theseus verlassen (Ariadne Left by Theseus), the composition of this painting is different, yet there are many similar elements. Ariadne is show in a more upright position and a cherub is mourning by her feet. The two paintings are similar in the fact that both women are shown reaching out, in mourning, and Theseus' ship is seen sailing away in the background. This version is on display in the Gemäldegalerie Alte Meister museum in Dresden, Germany. Kauffman again revisited the subject in 1794 with the painting Ariadne Abandoned by Theseus, Discovered by Bacchus (also called Bacchus and Ariadne). This painting has similarities and differences from the other two. It depicts Ariadne in a similar lounging position as Ariadne Abandoned by Theseus, but with a cherub present similar to Ariadne Left by Theseus. This painting also depicts Bacchus standing over her. This version is owned by the National Trust on display at Attingham Park in the United Kingdom.

== Myth ==
Ariadne is the daughter of Minos, king of Crete, in Greek mythology. She is put in charge of Minos' labyrinth where seven humans from Athens were sacrificed to the Minotaur every 7 or 9 years. Theseus is a member of those being sacrificed one year and volunteers to kill the Minotaur. Ariadne falls in love with Theseus and helps him through the labyrinth with thread or jewels. Some versions state Theseus declares that he'll marry her if he makes it out alive, while others say Ariadne asked to marry him. Many variations of this myth exist due to different translations. There are three main variations that involve Theseus leaving Ariadne. Ariadne either hangs herself, is left to die on the Island of Naxos, or Bacchus (Dionysus) finds and weds her. Ariadne Abandoned by Theseus shows Ariadne waking on Naxos after discovering that Theseus has left her. There is no indication of Bacchus in this painting, though Kauffman includes him in the 1794 version.

== See also ==
- List of paintings by Angelica Kauffman
