= Jupiter Disguised as Diana Seducing Callisto =

Painting by Angelica Kaufmann

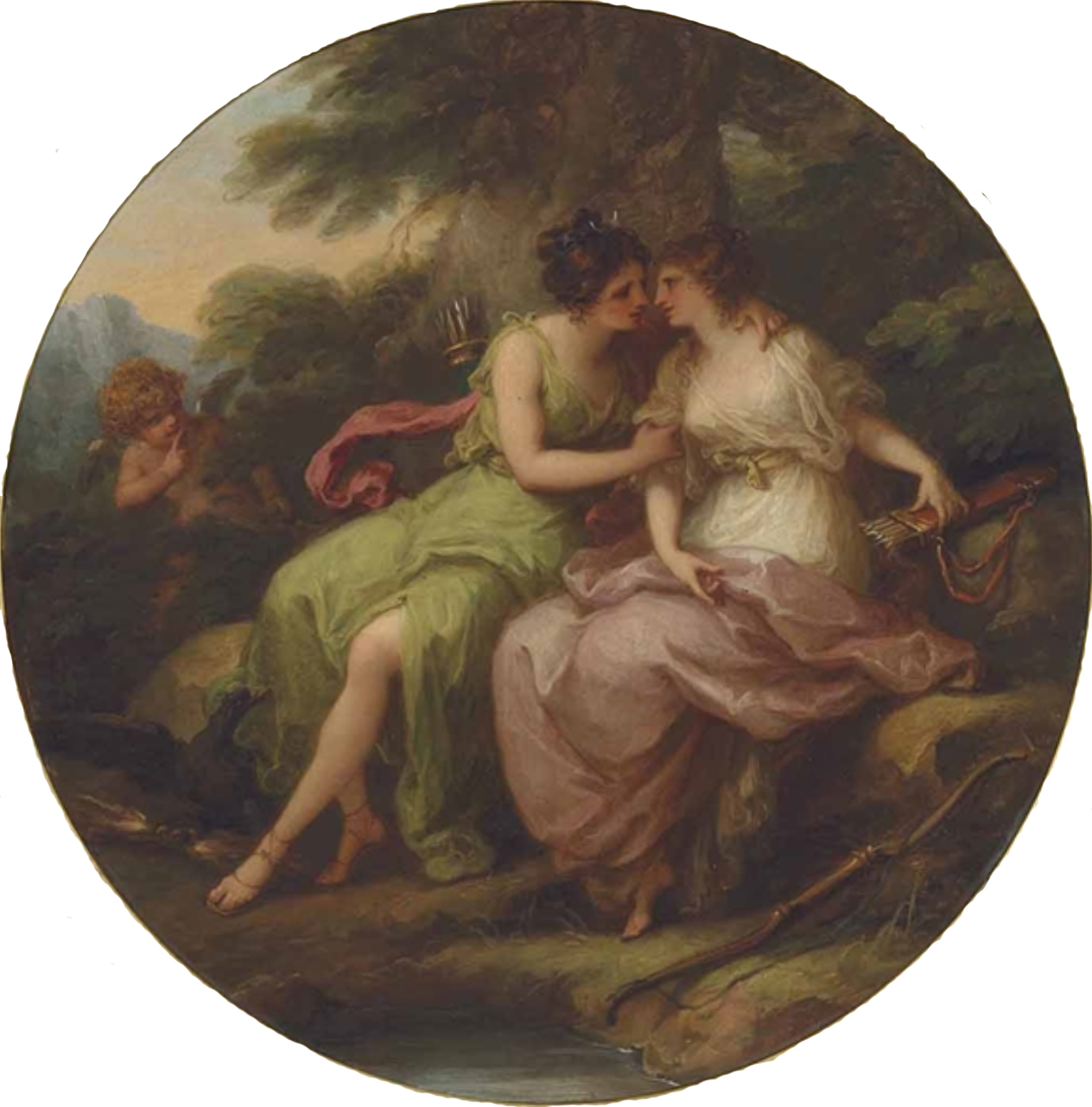
- Artist: Angelica Kauffman
- Year: c. 1766-1781
- Medium: Oil on canvas
- Dimensions: 65.8 cm × 65.8 cm (25.9 in × 25.9 in)
- Location: Private collection

Jupiter Disguised as Diana Seducing Callisto is a painting by Angelica Kauffman, painted during her 1766-1781 stay in Great Britain and now in a private collection. It shows Jupiter in disguise as Diana seducing Callisto. It was engraved by Thomas Burke. It is held in a private collection.

== History and description ==
The painting depicts a classic scene of seduction of a girl, but this time is between two beautiful girls. The one sitting on the left has a crescent moon in her hair, which is an attribute of the goddess Diana, but at her feet sits an eagle with lightning in its paws - a symbol of Jupiter, indicating that this is the supreme god in another form. Although the painting follows the European tradition, Kaufman's depiction has several significant deviations. In the 18th-century painting, it was usual to emphasize the differences between male and female characters, depicting the former in darker colors. In Kaufman’s painting there is no such contrast; there is no gender difference. In addition, in the depicted scene, the traditional gender roles of an active male and a passive female are absent. Although Diana (Jupiter) takes the initiative, leaning towards the nymph, Callisto does not look stiff and passive, she responds with her gaze, thereby expressing her own desire. It really seems to be a scene of lesbian seduction. To the left of Diana and Callisto is depicted Eros, who watches the scene from the bushes. He puts his finger on his lips, in a gesture indicating a call to silence, perhaps because he knows that Jupiter is deceiving, or maybe because he is witnessing something that cannot be mentioned openly, female seduction.

== Provenance ==
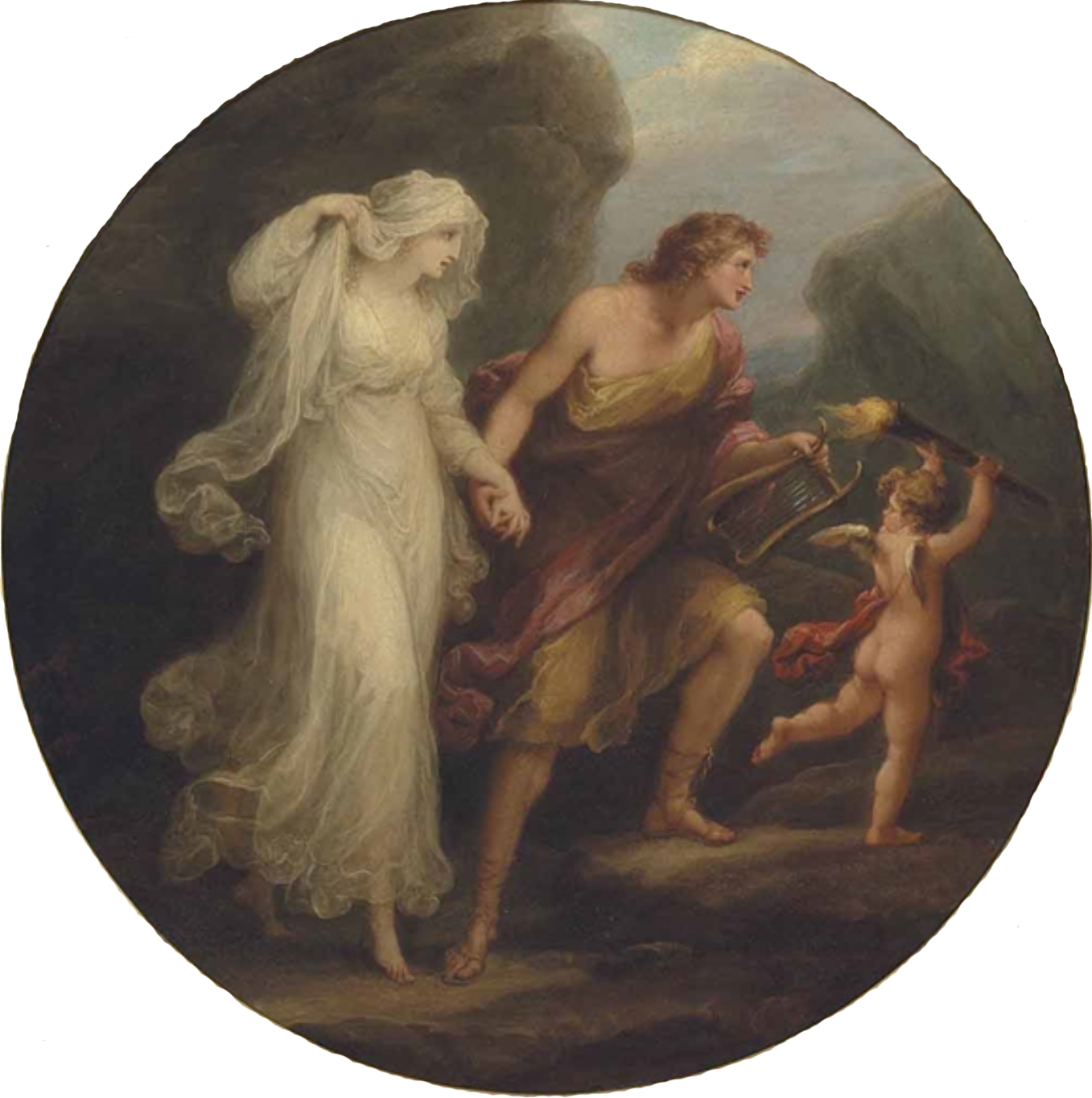
Orpheus and Eurydice

Part of a pair with Orpheus and Eurydice (the same size and format), they were both probably first owned by the French lawyer Charles Alexandre de Calonne (1734–1802). They were then sold at Skinner and Dyke auction in London on 27 March 1795 for 67 guineas to Sir Drummond Cospatrick Hamilton-Spencer-Smith, 5th Baronet (1876–1955). They were later acquired in the 1960s by a private collector, whose children sold the paintings on 5 July 2015 at Christie's for £206,500.

== See also ==
- List of paintings by Angelica Kauffman
