= Sappho Inspired by Love =

Painting by Angelica Kauffman

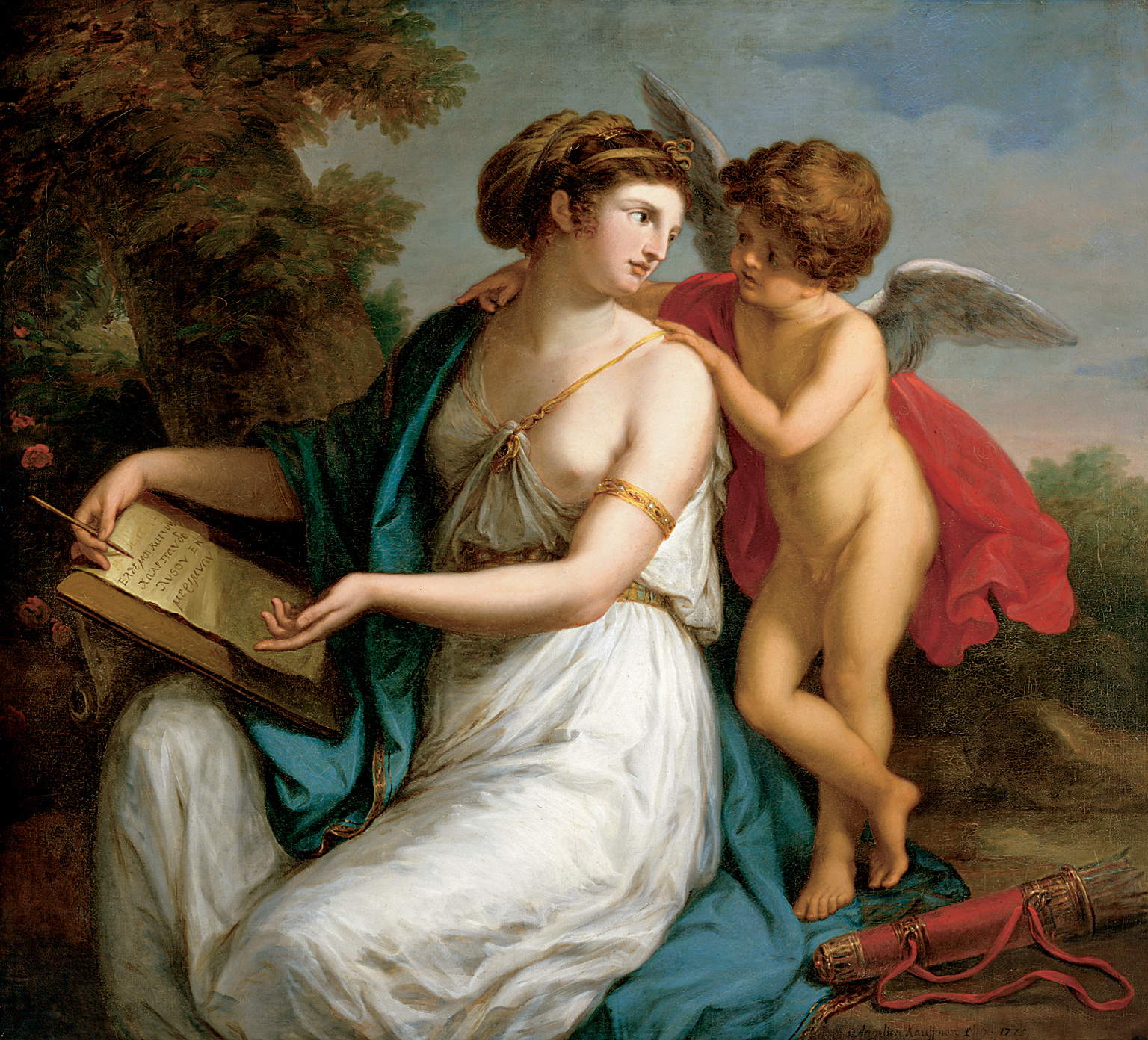
- Artist: Angelica Kauffman
- Year: 1775
- Medium: Oil on canvas
- Dimensions: 129.5 cm × 147.4 cm (51.0 in × 58.0 in)
- Location: John and Mable Ringling Museum of Art, Sarasota

Sappho Inspired by Love is an oil painting on canvas of 1775 by Angelica Kauffman, now in the John and Mable Ringling Museum of Art in Florida, having been in John Ringling's collection.

Sappho is shown holding a parchment inscribed "ἔλθε μοι καὶ νῦν, χαλέπαν δὲ λῦσον ἐκ μερίμναν" ('So come again and save me from unbearable pain'), the beginning of the last verse of her Ode to Aphrodite in ancient Greek from Joseph Addison's 1735 edition of the work.

In 1778 it was published as an engraving by G. S. Facius and J. G. Facius. A second version showing Sappho as an adult is a pendant to Ariadne Abandoned by Theseus; both were probably completed at the same time as the Florida work. It was presented as Mother and Child as Venus and Cupid at the 1783 Free Society of Artists exhibition in London and (unlike the Florida work) has a rocky landscape background with a volcano reminiscent of that in Sappho Gives Anacreon a Feather from Cupid's Wing by Antonio Zucchi, Kauffman's future husband.

On being exhibited at the 1775 Royal Academy Summer Exhibition the work now in Florida was simply entitled Sappho. It was probably acquired soon after this by John Baker Holroyd. In 1928 the painting was sold at Sotheby's along with other paintings from Holroyd's collection. It was bought c. 1928 by John Ringling, under the title Lady as Venus, with Cupid at her Side. In 1936 it was acquired by the Ringling Museum of Art, and by 1949 it was listed in the museum's collection catalogue as A Maiden with Cupid.

== See also ==
- List of paintings by Angelica Kauffman
