= Hector Summoning Paris to Battle =

1775 painting by Angelica Kauffman

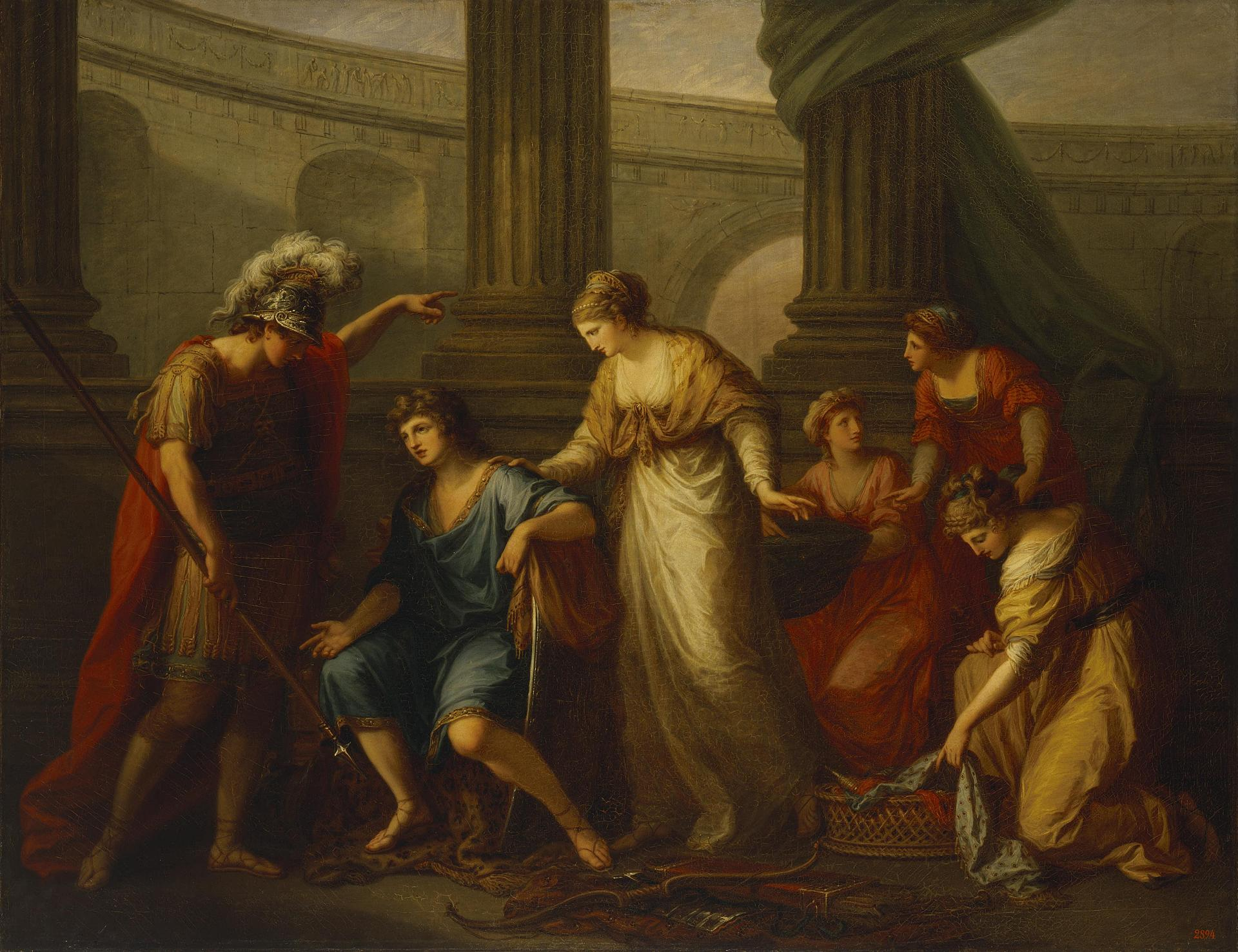
- Artist: Angelica Kauffman
- Year: 1775
- Medium: oil on canvas
- Dimensions: 137 cm × 178 cm (54 in × 70 in)
- Location: Hermitage Museum, Saint Petersburg

Hector Summoning Paris to Battle is an oil on canvas painting by Angelica Kauffman, from 1775. It is held in the Hermitage Museum, in Saint Petersburg. It shows a scene from the Iliad, with Paris sitting on a chair in the foreground with his bow at his feet, Helen of Troy and servants to the right and an armoured Hector with a lance to the left.

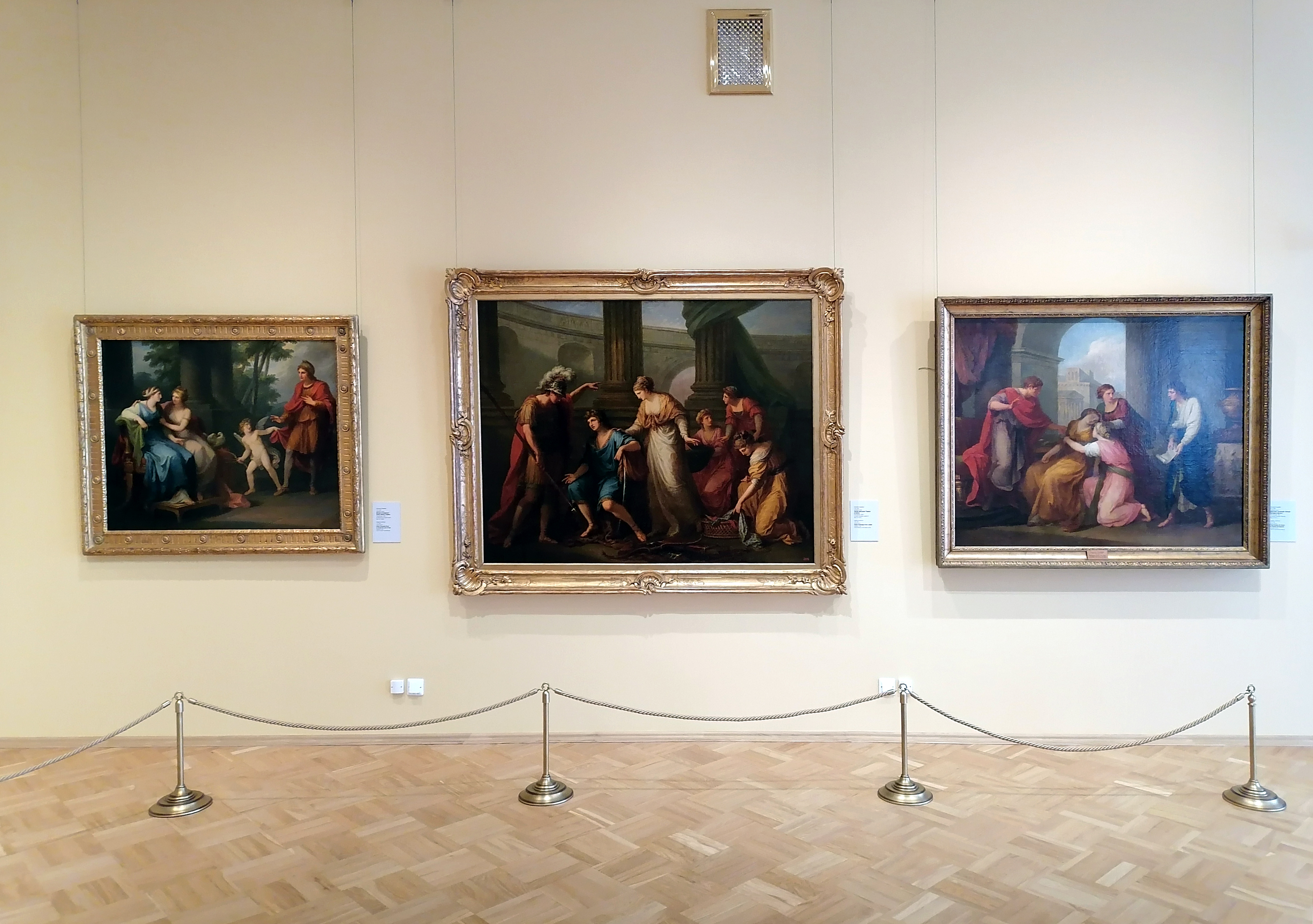
The work on display at the Winter Palace.

It is signed at middle left Angelica Kaufmann pinx. Anno 1775, with the number 2894 (its Hermitage catalogue number) at bottom right in red paint. Two other autograph versions survive, both in private collections, one dating to 1793 and the other undated. A historic oil on canvas copy of the work by an unknown artist was put on auction at Berlin Lepke on 19 November 1932.

The Hermitage work's history before 1782 is unclear. That year it was still in the artist's studio in London, where an engraving was produced of it by Gavriil Skorodumov, a member of the Russian Academy of Fine Arts. He mistitled it Ulysses Discovering Achilles Disguised as a Woman in Lycomedes' House. The painting entered the Hermitage sometime between then and 1797, when it was first recorded in that museum's inventory. Early in the 19th century it was in the Gatchina Palace, before returning to the Hermitage in 1926 then moving to the Academy of Arts soon afterwards, then on to the Superior Institute of Art and Technique. It was finally permanently returned to the Hermitage in 1930. It has been in room 348 of the Winter Palace since summer 2021.

== See also ==
- List of paintings by Angelica Kauffman

== Bibliography ==
- (in French) Peinture et sculpture à Rome dans la seconde moitié du XVIIIe siècle : catalogue de l’exposition / Musée de l’Ermitage. - SPb. : Izd-vl Gos. Ermitage, 2011. - 240 p. - ISBN 978-5-93572-424-5.
- (in French) Nikouline, N. N. : Peinture allemande et autrichienne des XV - XVIII siecles. Ermitage. Saint-Pétersbourg, Iskusstvo-SPb Publ., 1996.
