= Telemachus and the Nymphs of Calypso =

Painting by Angelica Kauffmann

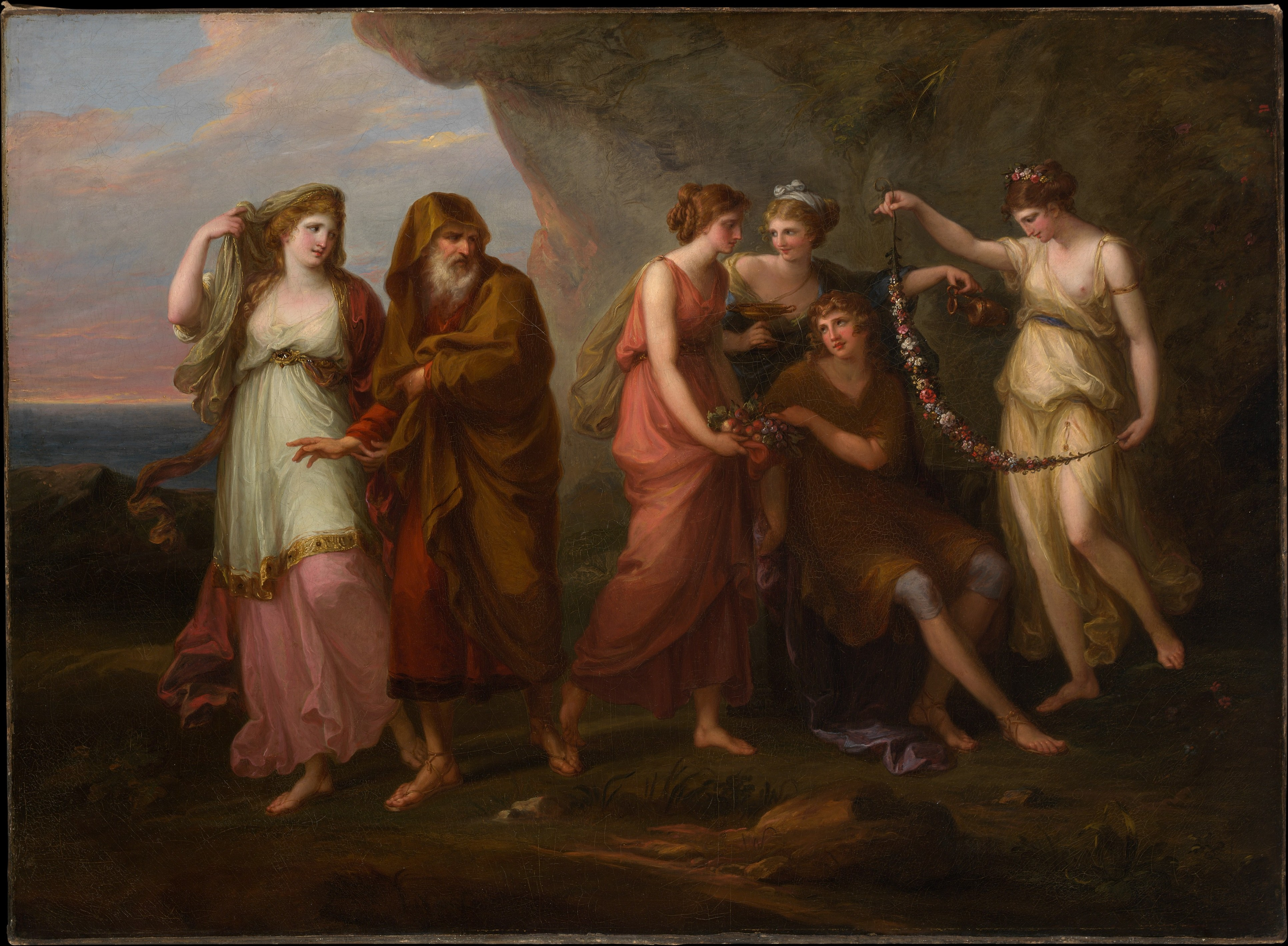
- Artist: Angelica Kauffman
- Year: 1782
- Medium: oil paint
- Dimensions: 82.6 cm × 112.4 cm (32.5 in × 44.3 in)
- Location: Metropolitan Museum of Art
- Accession: 25.110.188
- Website: Metropolitan Museum of Art

Telemachus and the Nymphs of Calypso is an oil painting by the Swiss artist Angelica Kauffman, from 1782. It is in the collection of the Metropolitan Museum of Art, in New York.

== Early history and creation ==
This painting and The Sorrow of Telemachus were painted for Monsignor Onorato Caetani (1742-1797). They show scenes from the French novel The Adventures of Telemachus published by François Fénelon in 1699, and based on the story of Telemachus, son of Odysseus.

== Description and interpretation ==
The work depicts the arrival of Telemachus on Ogygia, Calypso's island. He is welcomed by her nymphs with fruit, wine and flowers. The goddess Athena had been his guide, disguised as the old man Mentor, and is shown being led away to the left by one of the nymphs.

== See also ==
- List of paintings by Angelica Kauffman
