= The Sorrow of Telemachus =

1783 painting by Angelica Kauffmann

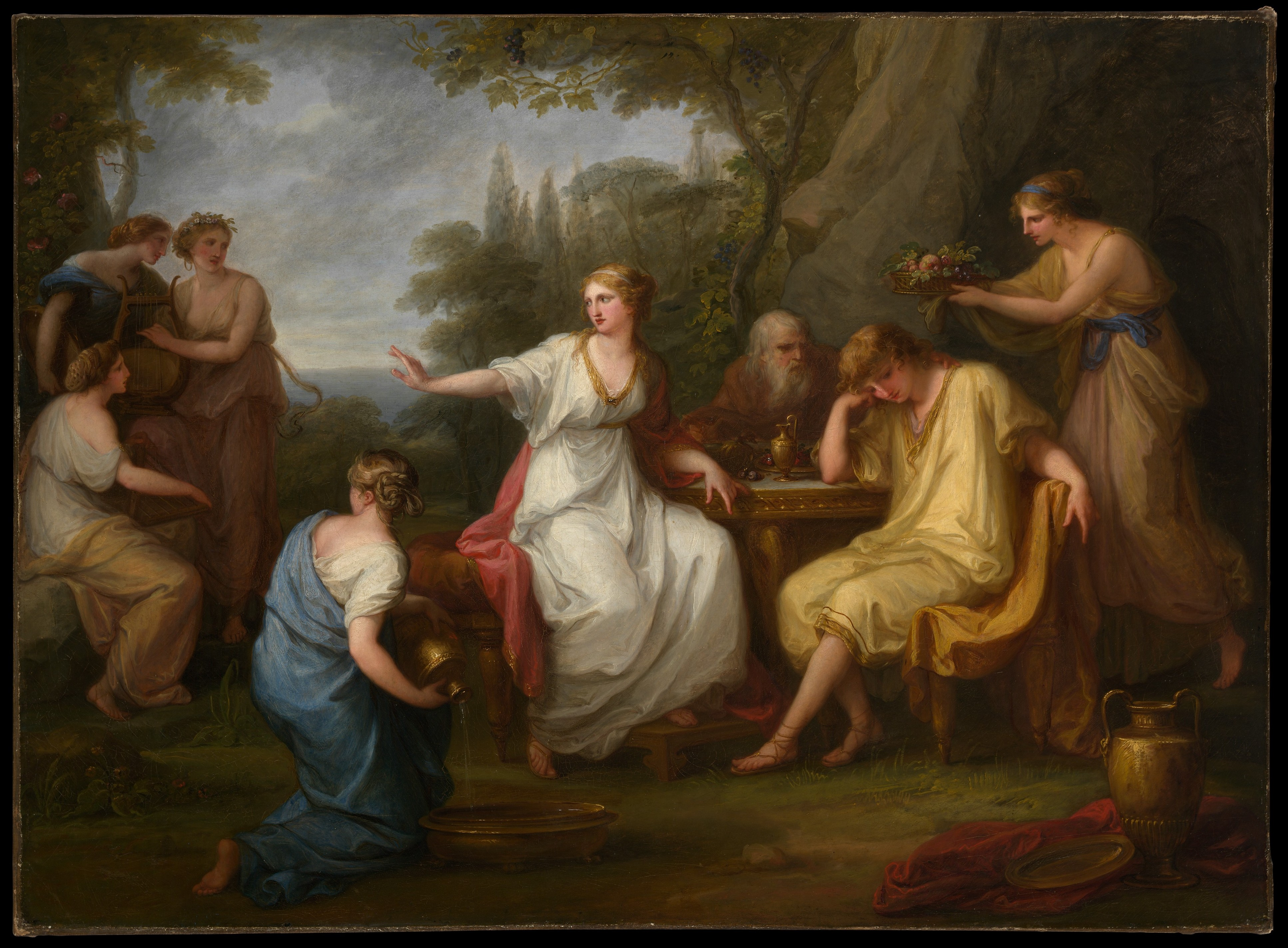
- Artist: Angelica Kauffman
- Year: 1783
- Medium: oil paint, canvas
- Dimensions: 83.2 cm (32.8 in) × 114.3 cm (45.0 in)
- Location: Metropolitan Museum of Art
- Accession: 25.110.187

The Sorrow of Telemachus is an oil painting by the Swiss artist Angelica Kauffman, from 1783. It is in the collection of the Metropolitan Museum of Art, in New York.

== Early history and creation ==
This painting and Telemachus and the Nymphs of Calypso were painted for Monsignor Onorato Caetani (1742-1797). They show scenes from the French novel The Adventures of Telemachus published by François Fénelon in 1699, and based on the story of Telemachus, son of Odysseus.

== Description and interpretation ==
Telemachus was shipwrecked off Calypso's island, and in this image she tells her nymphs to stop singing Odysseus's praises because of his son's grief.

== Other versions ==
Kauffman painted two other versions of this work: in 1788 (held by the Bündner Museum of Art in Chur, Switzerland, and in 1789 (sold by Christie's in London in April 1998).

== See also ==
- List of paintings by Angelica Kauffman
