= Venus Persuading Helen to Love Paris =

1790 painting by Angelica Kauffman

- Artist: Angelica Kauffman
- Year: 1790
- Medium: Oil on canvas
- Dimensions: 102 cm × 128 cm (40 in × 50 in)
- Location: Hermitage Museum, Saint Petersburg

Venus Persuading Helen to Love Paris or Venus Induces Helen to Fall in Love with Paris is a 1790 oil on canvas painting by Angelica Kauffman. It is held in the Hermitage Museum, in Saint Petersburg.

Preparatory sketches survive in the Royal Collection and the British Museum. Previously in the collection in the Yusupov Palace, the painting was seized by the state after the Russian Revolution and kept in the Palace (converted into the Yusupov Palace Museum) until 1925, when it was moved to its present home in the Hermitage Museum.

== Description and analysis ==
It shows Helen of Troy (far left) being persuaded by Venus (centre) to fall in love with Paris (right), abandon her husband Menelaus and go with Paris to Troy, thus triggering the Trojan War. Venus' son Cupid holds Paris's hand.

The painting depicts Venus sitting to Helen's left, while persuading her to love Paris. He is already convinced and moves forward, but his upper body is still behind, because he is slightly intimidated and waiting for Helen's response. Cupid, helper of Venus, guides him by holding his cloak and holds his bow with two arrows. Future love is symbolized by the two white doves installed on the mantle of Venus. The goddess of love holds Helene by the shoulder and arm to convince her to love Paris by looking her straight in the eyes. Helen, dressed in blue, has a more submissive look and she raises her eyes towards Paris, with her face in profile. The look of the three main characters makes up an important imaginary line of the painting.

The scene takes place on a peristyle. It is limited at the bottom by the base of the columns in front of a grove. In the background on the right, behind Paris, a landscape of hills opens the perspective. The construction of the painting is complex, with light coming from the left. The light passes from Helen's passive arm to the chest of Venus and finally to the body of Cupid who is thus at the center of the scene and the most illuminated. It is in fact on him that the fate of the two lovers depends.

The style of this painting is neoclassical. It is allusive and we see neither Paris nor Helen in poses, unlike the painters of the Renaissance and the Baroque on dealing with the same subject.

== See also ==
- List of paintings by Angelica Kauffman
