= Zeuxis Selecting Models for His Painting of Helen of Troy =

Painting by Angelica Kauffman

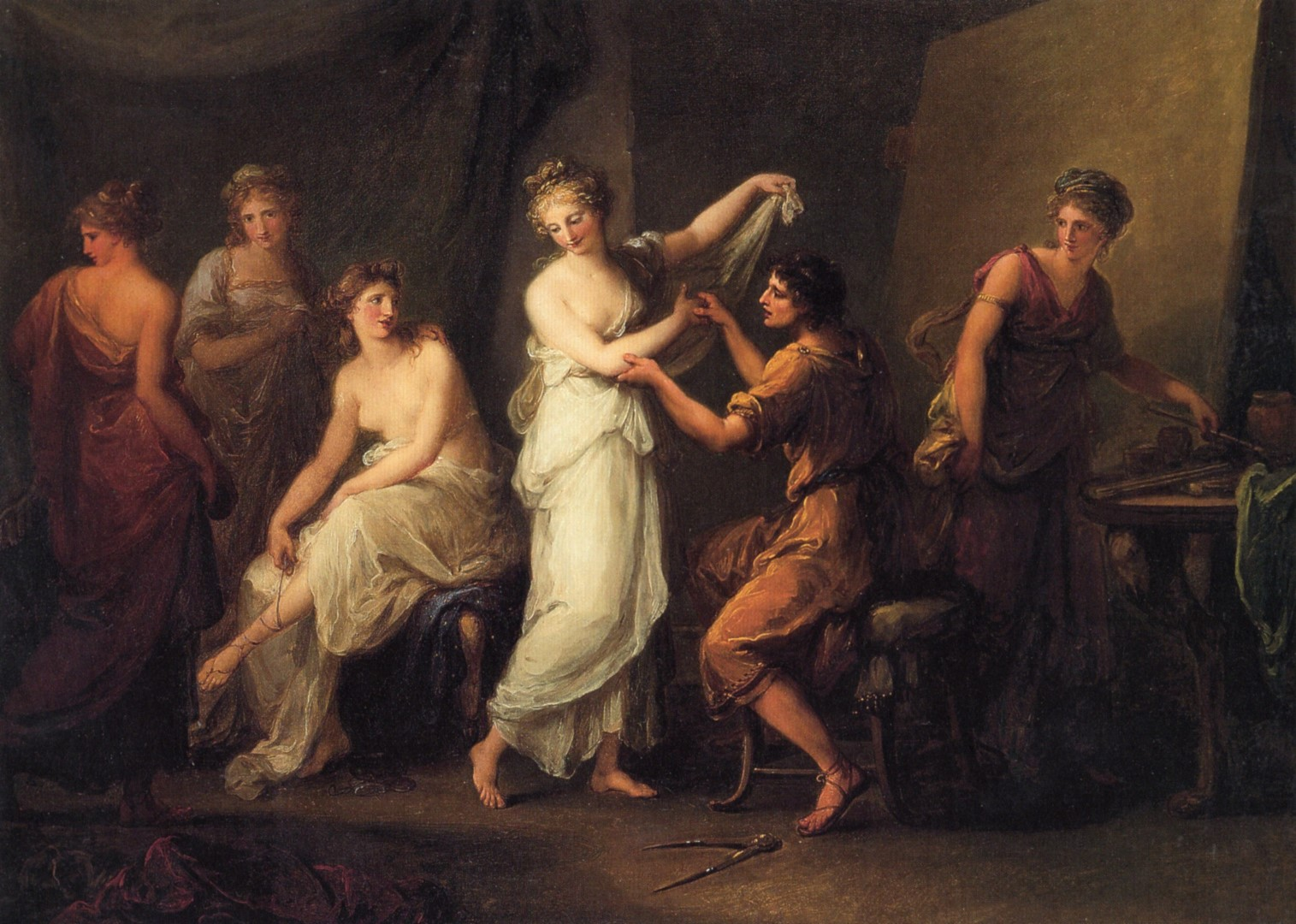
- Artist: Angelica Kauffman
- Year: c.1778
- Type: Oil on canvas, history painting
- Dimensions: 77.3 cm × 110 cm (30.45 in × 43 in)
- Location: Brown University; Providence

Zeuxis Selecting Models for His Painting of Helen of Troy is a c.1778 history painting by the Swiss artist Angelica Kauffman. The painting features a legendary scene featuring the Ancient Greek painter Zeuxis who attempting to produce a picture of Helen of Troy struggled to find a model to capture her celebrated beauty. Ultimately he chose five different women from the island of Crotone in Magna Graecia to produce a composite work of ideal beauty.

Kauffman was a leading artist of the Neoclassical style and she sought to provide authenticity by basing the stances of the various women on classical statues. Today the painting is in the collection of Brown University in Providence, Rhode Island.

== See also ==
- List of paintings by Angelica Kauffman
- Zeuxis Choosing the Most Beautiful Women from Croton as His Models, a 1789 painting by François-André Vincent

== Bibliography ==
- Alexander, David S. Angelica Kauffman: A Continental Artist in Georgian England. Reaktion Books, 1992.
- Moyle, Franny. Mrs Kauffman and Madame Le Brun: The Entwined Lives of Two Great Eighteenth-Century Women Artists. Bloomsbury Publishing, 2025.
- Perry, Gillian & Rossington, Michael. Femininity and Masculinity in Eighteenth-century Art and Culture. Manchester University Press, 1994.
