= Self-Portrait (Kauffman, 1784) =

1784 painting by Angelica Kauffman

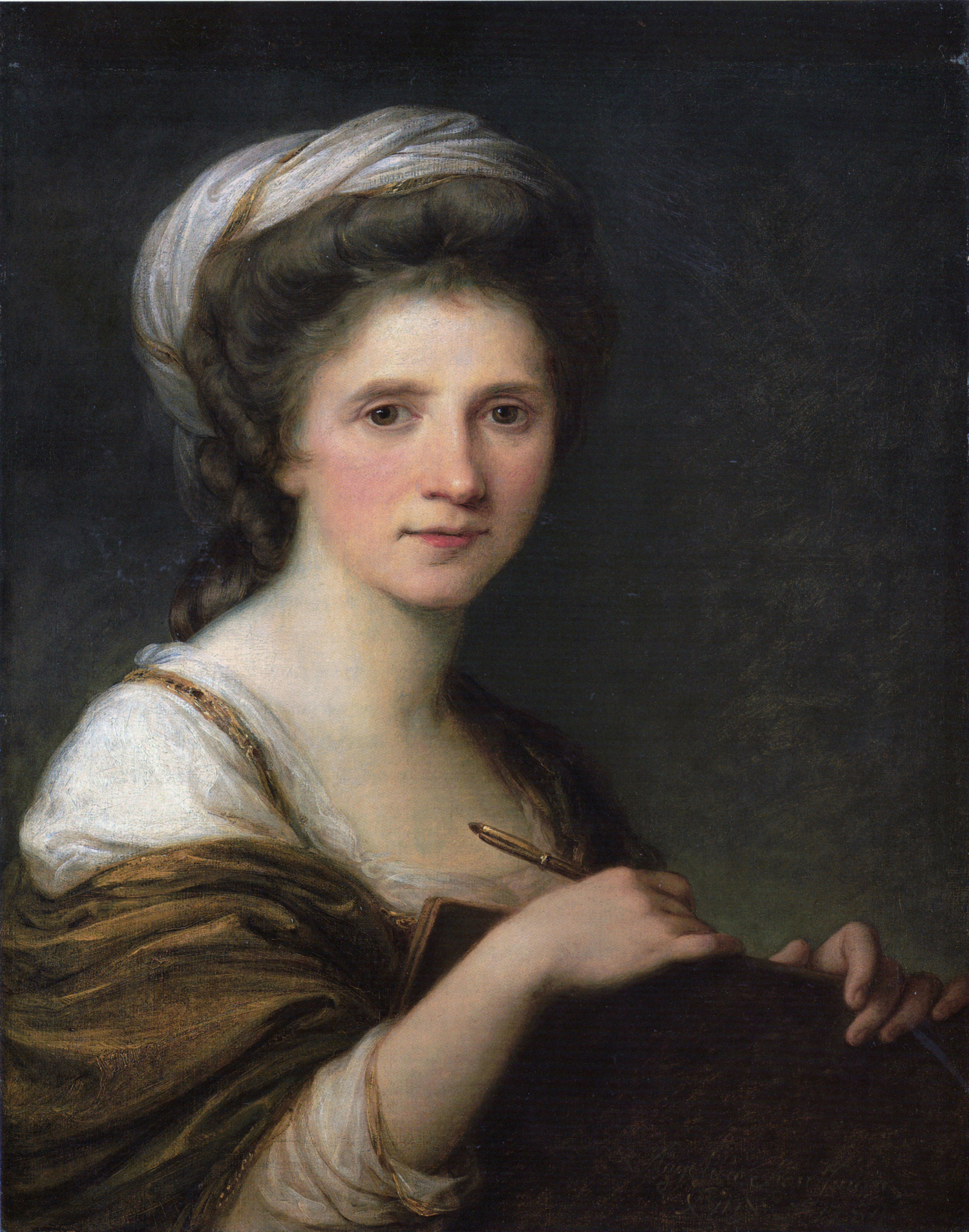
- Artist: Angelica Kauffman
- Year: 1784
- Medium: oil on canvas
- Dimensions: 64.7 cm × 50.7 cm (25.5 in × 20.0 in)
- Location: Neue Pinakothek, Munich

Self-Portrait is an oil on canvas self portrait by Angelica Kauffman, from 1784. It is held in the Neue Pinakothek, in Munich, having been acquired by Louis I of Bavaria for his collection in 1826.

Kauffman is depicted wearing a turban and looking directly at the viewer, holding a pen and her drawing briefcase. She follows the Renaissance tradition of the portraits of a Sibyl, similarly to painters like Raphael and Domenichino.

== See also ==
- List of paintings by Angelica Kauffman
