= Portrait of Ludwig, Crown Prince of Bavaria =

Painting by Angelica Kauffman

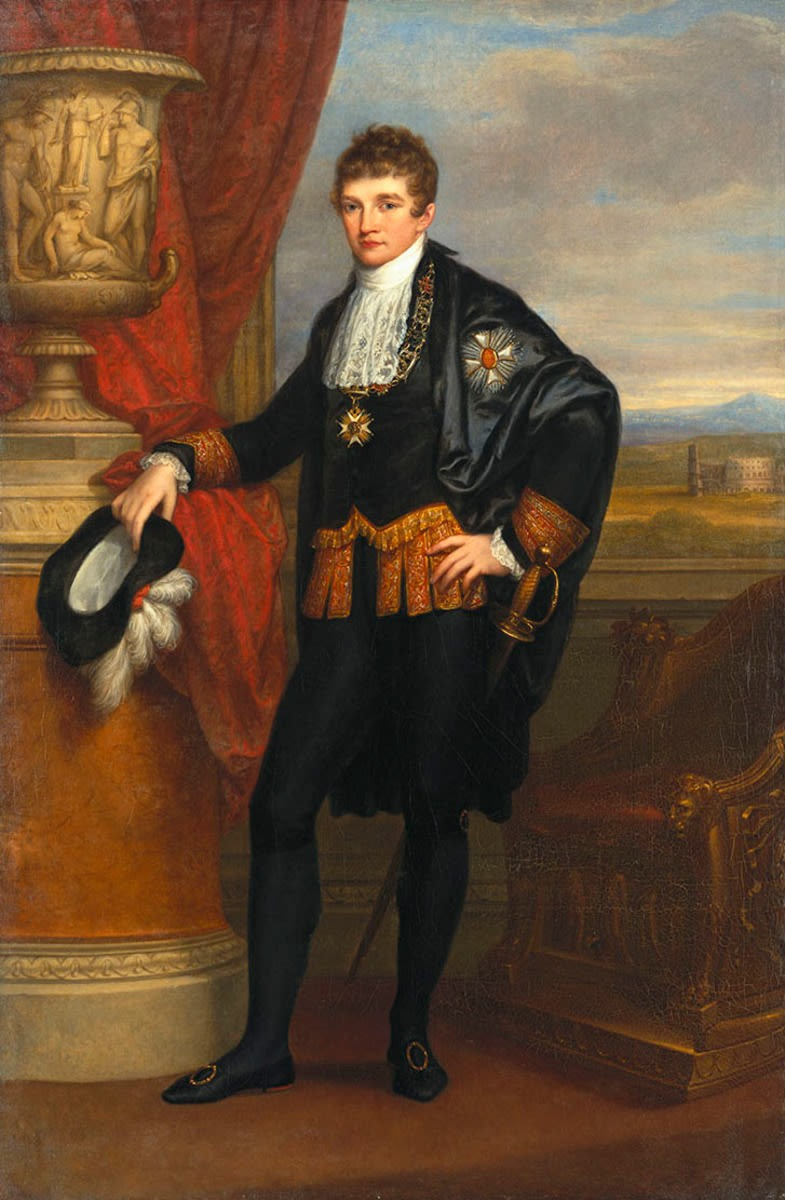
- Artist: Angelica Kauffman
- Year: 1807
- Type: Oil on canvas, portrait painting
- Dimensions: 224.6 cm × 146.8 cm (88.4 in × 57.8 in)
- Location: Neue Pinakothek, Munich

Portrait of Ludwig, Crown Prince of Bavaria is an 1807 portrait painting by the Swiss artist Angelica Kauffman. It depicts the future king Ludwig I of Bavaria, then crown prince and heir to his father Maximilian I. He had embarked on a grand tour in Italy when he sat for Kauffman in French-controlled Rome. At the time Bavaria was allied to Napoleon in the Napoleonic Wars. Ludwig was later an instrumental figure in Bavaria's decision to change sides in 1813. Once he became King in 1822, his encouragement of the arts and architecture led to his capital Munich being dubbed "New Athens".

Kauffman had worked in Britain for a number of years, where she was a founding member of the Royal Academy of Arts, before settling in Rome. This was one of her final works as she died the same year. Today the painting is in the collection of the Neue Pinakothek in Munich.

== See also ==
- List of paintings by Angelica Kauffman
- Portrait of Ludwig I of Bavaria, an 1825 portrait by Joseph Karl Stieler

== Bibliography ==
- Corti, Count. Ludwig I of Bavaria. Eyre & Spottiswood, 1943.
- Giannakopoulou, Georgia. Building Modern Antiquity: Hymns and Laments for Athens. Taylor & Francis, 2024.
- Glaser, Hubert & Büttner, Frank. Ludwig I. und die Neue Pinakothek. Pinakothek-DuMont, 2003.
- Natter, Tobias G. Angelica Kauffman: A Woman of Immense Talent. Hatje Cantz, 2007.
