= Ferdinand I and His Family =

Painting by Angelica Kauffman

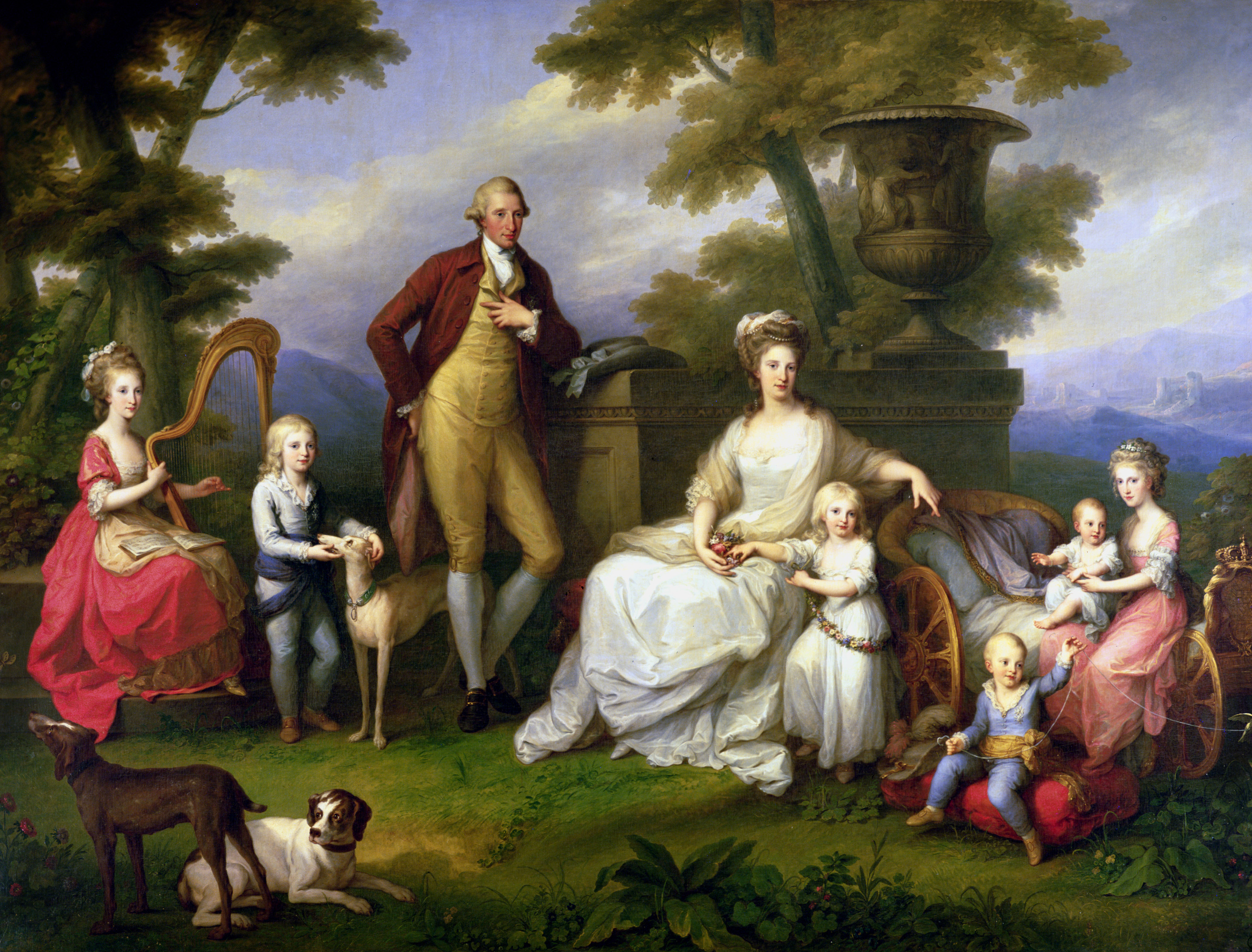
- Artist: Angelica Kauffman
- Year: 1782
- Medium: oil on canvas
- Dimensions: 310 cm × 426 cm (120 in × 168 in)
- Location: National Museum of Capodimonte, Naples

Ferdinand I and His Family is an oil-on-canvas painting by the Swiss artist Angelica Kauffman, from 1782. It is held in the National Museum of Capodimonte, in Naples.

== History and description ==
The group portrait was created during Kauffmann's Neapolitan stay, between 1782 and 1783. She had come from London, and was welcomed by the Royal House with honors; she even became a close friend of Queen Maria Carolina of Austria. Kauffman completed the painting in Rome, where the work was praised by Ippolito Pindemonte.

The protagonists of the work, which is based on preliminary live studies, are all arranged along a horizontal line on a single plane, in a confident attitude, similarly to the typical scheme for the English group portraits. The Royal couple are shown in the centre, with their children: Maria Theresa and Francis, in a group to the left and Maria Cristina, Maria Luisa, Maria Amalia and Gennaro Giuseppe (who died in infancy) are in a group to the right.

There are some furnishing elements in the painting, such as a cradle for walking, a large vase placed on a base and a harp, elements that refer to the harmonious and luxuriant nature of the Campania region, which is found in the background of the canvas, almost indefinite.

During the 19th century it was put on display in the portrait gallery of the Capodimonte Palace.

== See also ==
- List of paintings by Angelica Kauffman
