= Christ and the Samaritan Woman (Kauffman) =

Painting by Angelica Kauffman

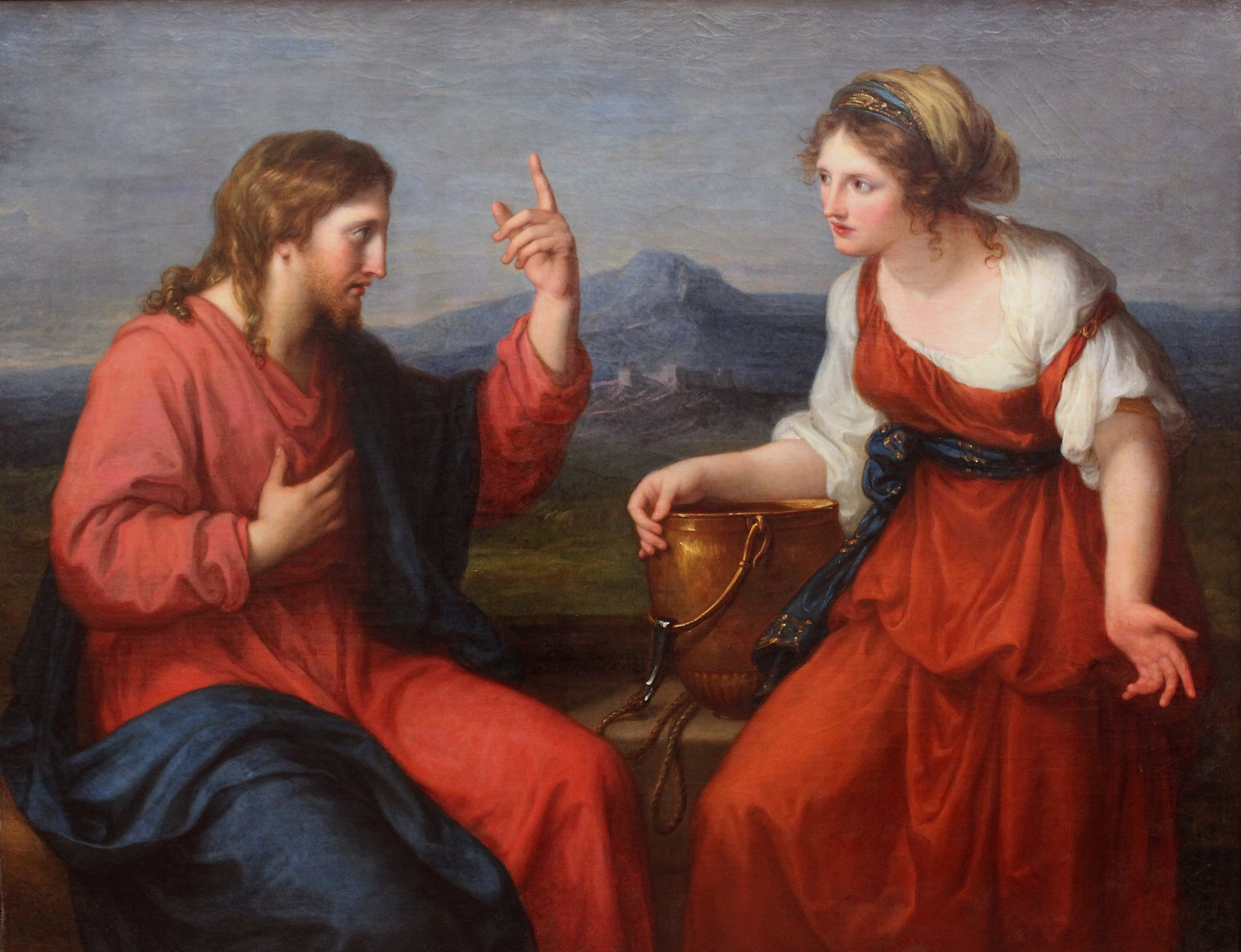
- Artist: Angelica Kauffman
- Year: 1796
- Medium: Oil on canvas
- Dimensions: 123.5 cm × 158.5 cm (48.6 in × 62.4 in)
- Location: Neue Pinakothek, Munich

Christ and the Samaritan Woman at the Well is a painting in oils on canvas of 1796 by Angelica Kauffman, depicting the eponymous Gospel passage. It was bought from the artist's estate in 1829 by Louis I of Bavaria and remained in the House of Wittelsbach until it was transferred to the Wittelsbacher Ausgleichsfonds in 1926; it then passed to the State of Bavaria in 1938. The work now hangs in the Neue Pinakothek in Munich.

== See also ==
- List of paintings by Angelica Kauffman
