= The Parting of Abelard and Heloise =

Painting by Angelica Kauffman

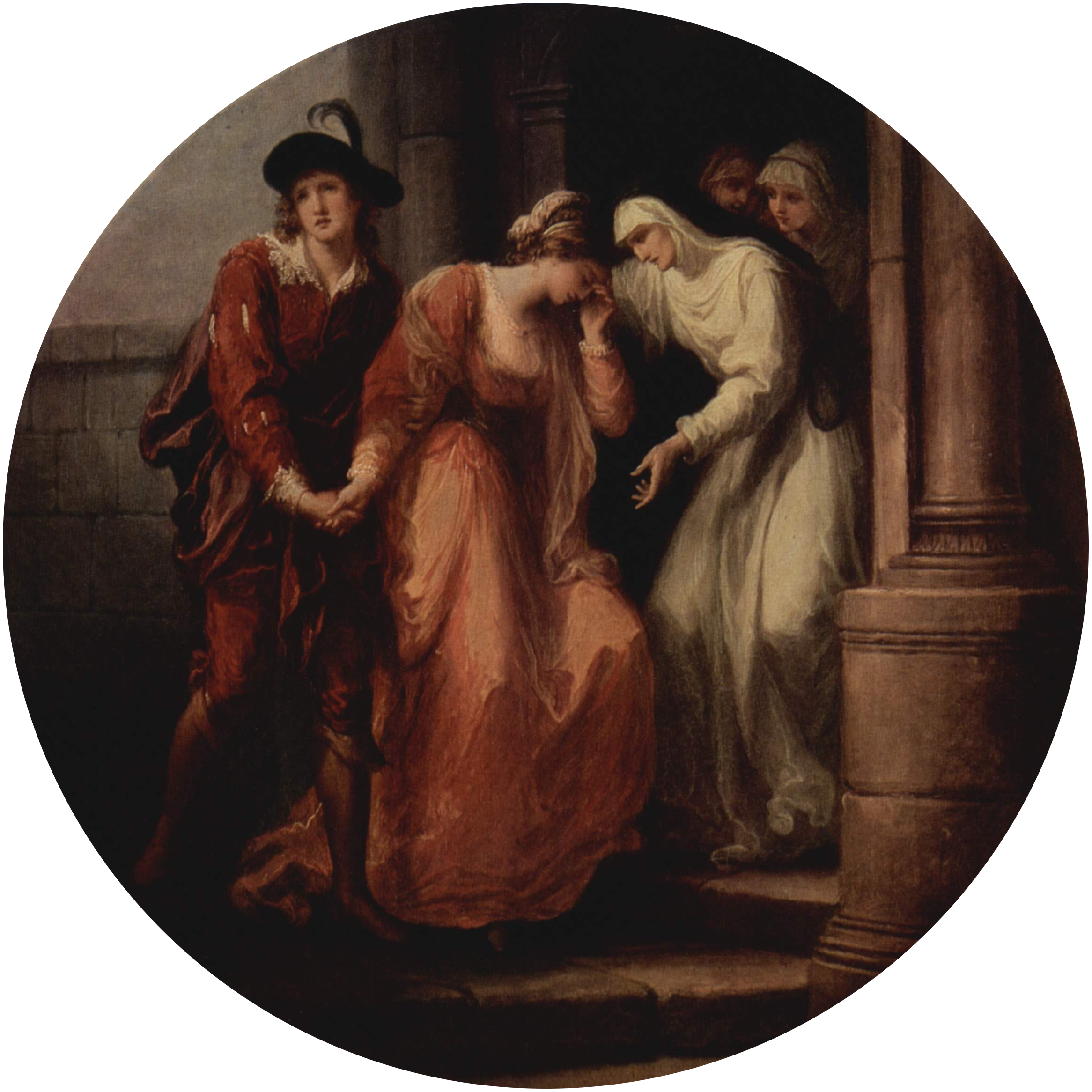
The Parting of Abelard and Heloise (1770s) by Angelica Kauffman

The Parting of Abelard and Heloise or Abelard and Heloise Say Farewell is an oil on canvas painting by Angelica Kauffman. It is signed on a block of stone at bottom centre Angelica K. pinx. It shows Peter Abelard and Héloïse parting as she enters the convent of Sainte-Marie at Argenteuil. In 1780 it was engraved by the Russian artist Gavriil Skorodumov. It was already in a 1797 inventory of the Hermitage Museum, where it still hangs, but it is unclear when it entered the collection.

== See also ==
- List of paintings by Angelica Kauffman
