= Penelope at Her Loom =

Painting by Angelica Kauffman

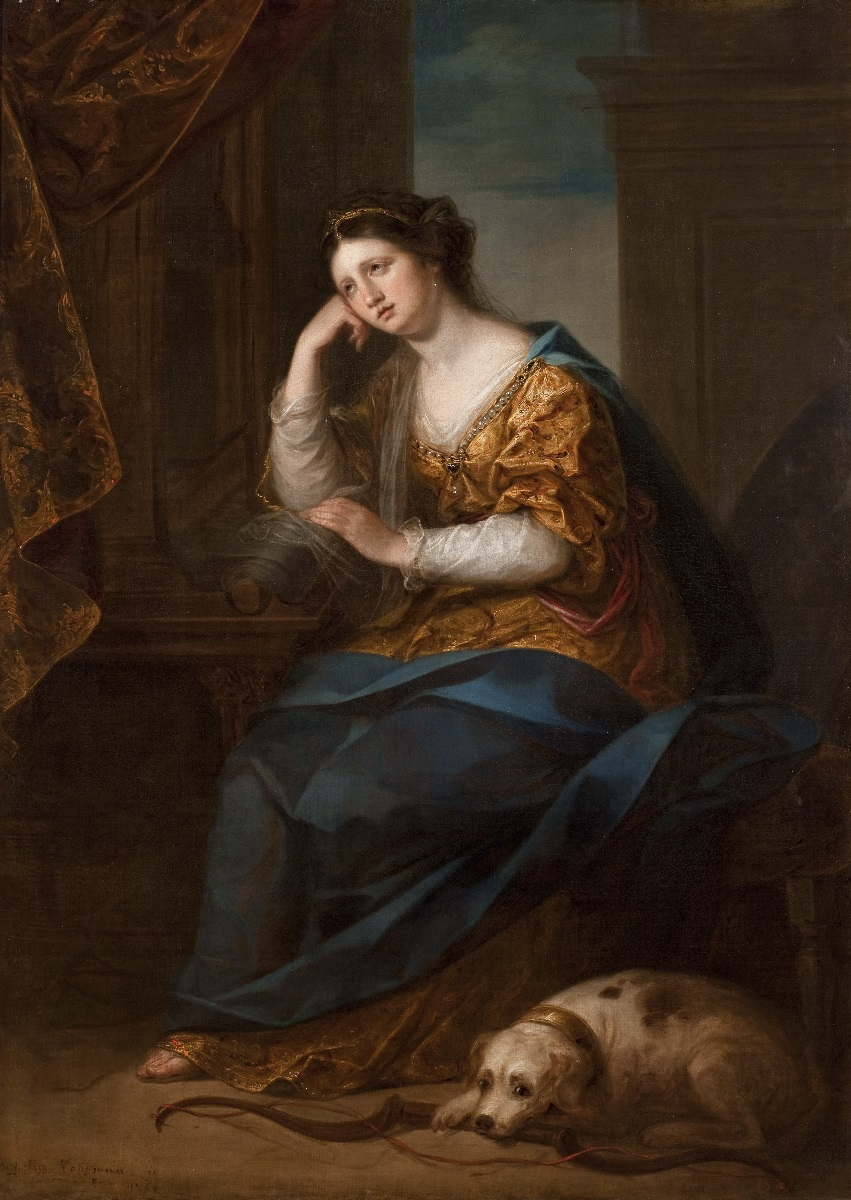
- Artist: Angelica Kauffman
- Year: 1764
- Type: Oil on canvas, history painting
- Dimensions: 169 cm × 118 cm (67 in × 46 in)
- Location: Brighton Museum and Art Gallery; East Sussex

Penelope at Her Loom is a 1764 history painting by the Swiss artist Angelica Kauffman. It features a scene from Homer's epic poem The Odyssey part of Greek mythology. Penelope, while faithfully waiting for her husband Odysseus to return from the Trojan War, was pressed by various suitors to marry them as it was believed Odysseus had perished. She used a delaying tactic, suggesting she would only consider remarrying once she has finished weaving a burial shroud for her father-in-law Laertes. Each night she unpicks the day's stitching from the loom.

Part of the emerging Neoclassical movement, he painting was produced while Kauffman was in Italy as a commission from a British Grand Tourist. The composition reflects common depictions of Penelope on Greek vases. The face was based on an ancient statue of Niobe. Kauffman subsequently moved to London where she was a founder member of the Royal Academy of Arts.

Today the painting is part of the collection of Brighton Museum and Art Gallery at Brighton Pavilion.

== See also ==
- List of paintings by Angelica Kauffman

== Bibliography ==
- Alexander, David S. Angelica Kauffman: A Continental Artist in Georgian England. Reaktion Books, 1992.
- Moyle, Franny. Mrs Kauffman and Madame Le Brun: The Entwined Lives of Two Great Eighteenth-Century Women Artists. Bloomsbury Publishing, 2025.
