= Portrait of Winckelmann =

Painting by Angelica Kauffman

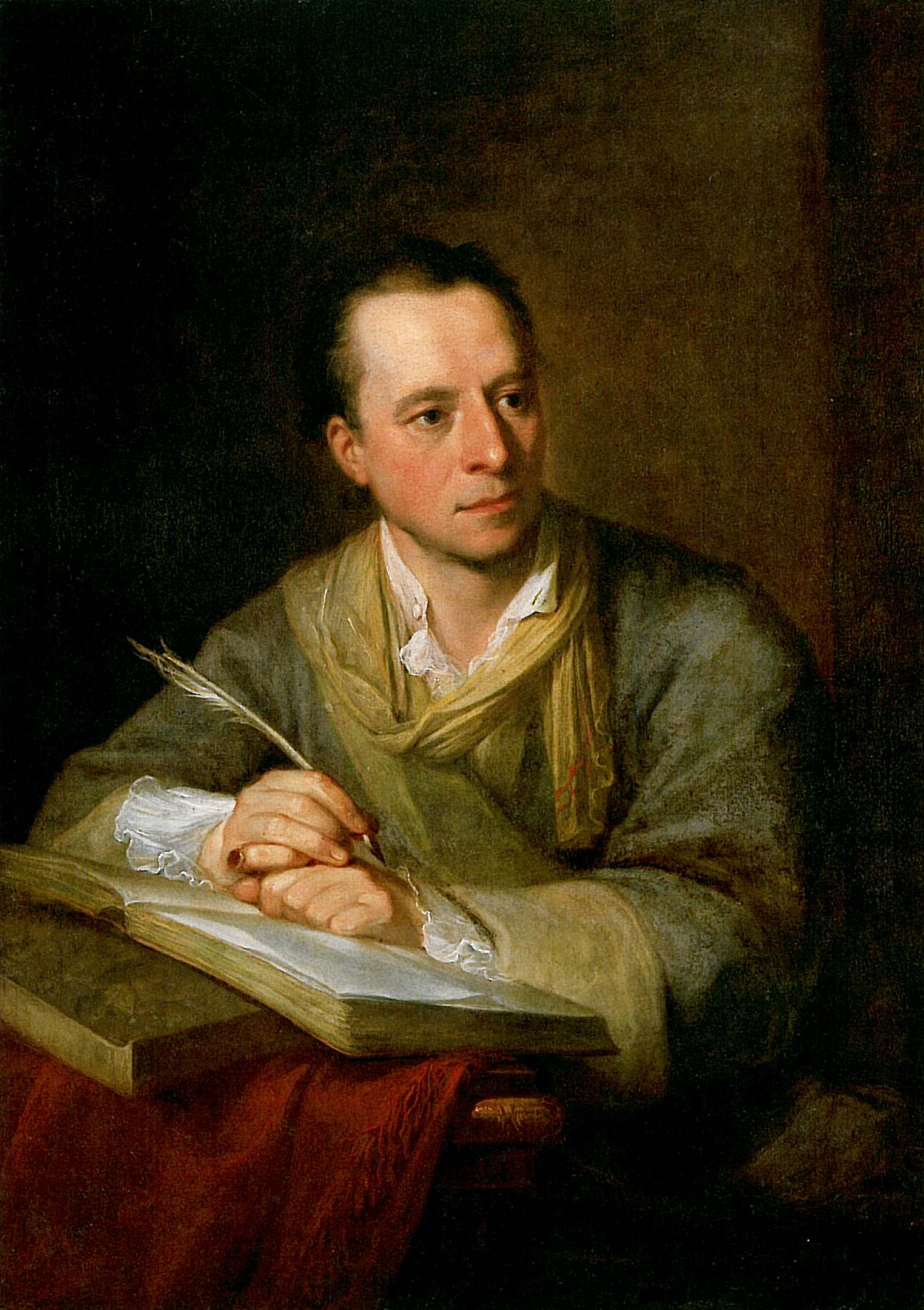
- Artist: Angelica Kauffman
- Year: 1764
- Medium: oil on canvas
- Dimensions: 97 cm × 71 cm (38 in × 28 in)
- Location: Kunsthaus Zürich, Zürich

Portrait of Winckelmann is an oil on canvas painting by the Swiss artist Angelica Kauffmann, from 1764. It was produced in Rome and represents the famous archaeologist and art historian Johann Joachim Winckelmann, whose work greatly contributed to the revival of classical studies and the change in style from rococo to neoclassicism. It is signed at the lower right by the artist and is now in the Kunsthaus Zürich.

== Description ==
The painting depicts Winckelmann seated at his work table, with a pen in his right hand. Both his hands rest on an open book, who is placed on a flat antique bas-relief representing the Three Graces. The bas-relief itself is placed on a red fabric.

Kauffmann demonstrates great mastery through this painting. It is composed in the two complementary colors, green and red. The gradient of green tones ranging from verdigris to olive on the background and on the clothing, complements the red fabric under the bas-relief. Touches of white seem to light up the painting, as seen in the pages of the book, lace on the sleeves and collar, and support the construction lines of the painting (enhanced by light touches of yellow), one of which runs diagonally along the book and the table, and the other vertically at the face. All the light in the painting comes from the left side, which is emphasized by the use of white and suggested by the touches of yellow.

This portrait, in his simplicity and mastery, can be compared with other portrait of Winckelmann, made by Anton von Maron, in 1768.

== Reception ==
Angelica Kauffmann, who was only twenty-two years old when she painted this portrait, truly began her career with this painting, thanks to which she was able to obtain new commissions in the cultivated circles of her time. The same year Winckelmann published his famous work History of the Art of Antiquity.

She made this painting on commission from a Swiss friend of Winckelmann. The latter was very satisfied with it, especially since it was subsequently widely disseminated by the mean of engraving.

== See also ==
- List of paintings by Angelica Kauffman

== Bibliography ==
- (in German) Bettina Baumgärtel, Angelika Kauffmann, Ostfildern, Hatje, 1998, ISBN 3-7757-0756-5
- (in German) Tobias G. Natter, Angelica Kauffmann, Hatje Cantz, Ostfildern, 2007, ISBN 978-3-7757-1984-1
