= Vortigern and Rowena (painting) =

Painting by Angelica Kauffman

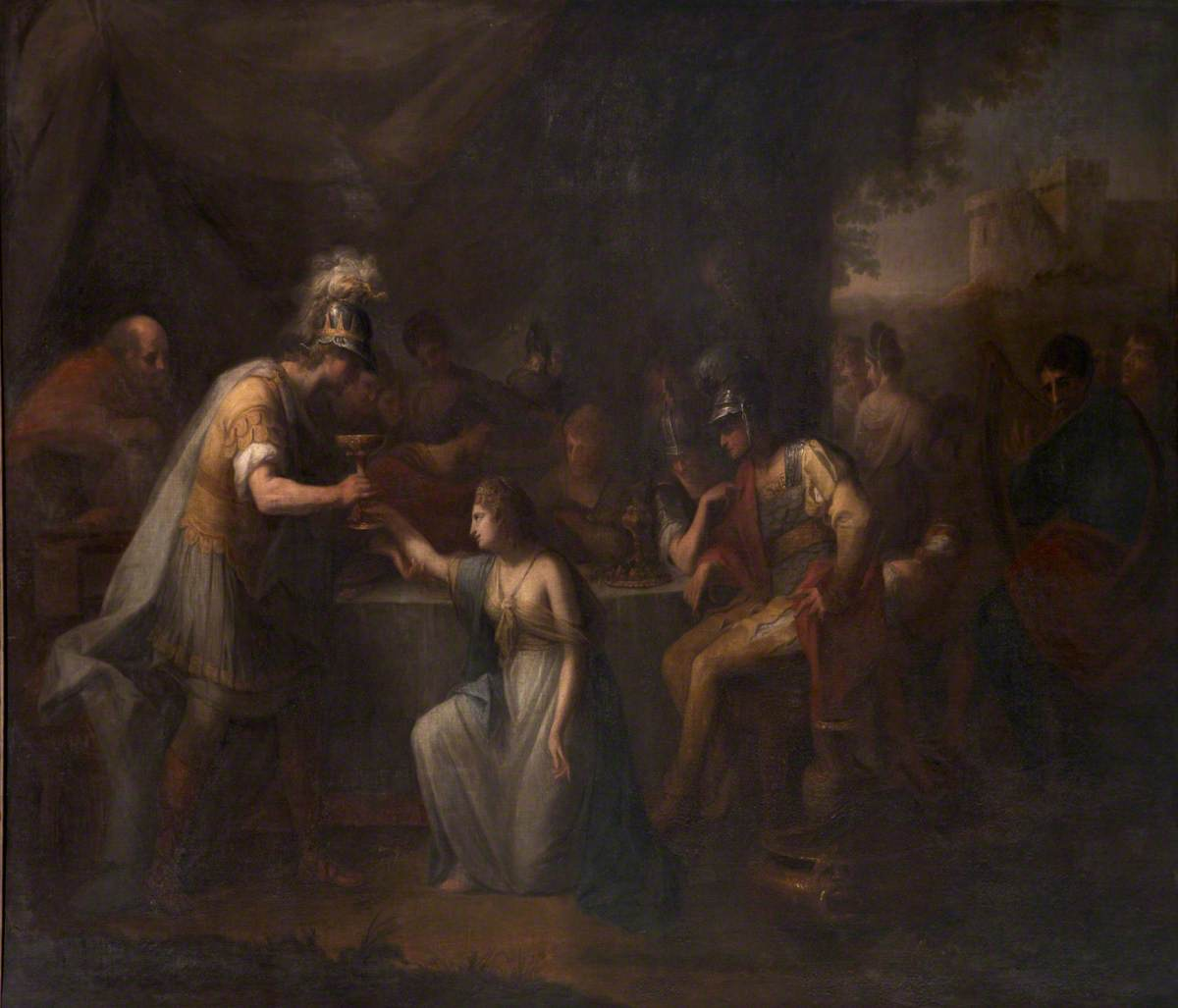
- Artist: Angelica Kauffman
- Year: 1770
- Type: Oil on canvas, history painting
- Dimensions: 153.7 cm × 214.6 cm (60.5 in × 84.5 in)
- Location: Saltram House; Devon

Vortigern and Rowena, also known by the longer title Vortigern, King of Britain, Enamoured with Rowena at the Banquet of Hengist the Saxon General, is a 1770 history painting by the Swiss artist Angelica Kauffman. It depicts a mythical scene in the early period of Anglo-Saxon England. Hengest, the Saxon warlord has set out to win over the British king Vortigern with the beauty of his daughter Rowena. The subject had featured in a notable image produced by the Irish illustrator Nicholas Blakey in the 1750s, and Kauffman drew on this while making significant changes.

Kauffman, noted for her portraits but increasingly moving into the prestigious history genre, had first arrived in London in 1766. The painting was displayed at the Royal Academy Exhibition 1770 held in London's Pall Mall. It was the first history painting to be exhibited at the Royal Academy displaying a notable scene from British history. It was acquired by John Parker and his wife Theresa for their country estate Saltram House in Devon, now part of the National Trust. The purchase was likely influenced by Joshua Reynolds, the president of the Royal Academy and a friend and supporter of Kauffman.

== See also ==
- List of paintings by Angelica Kauffman
- Vortigern and Rowena, a 1796 play forming part of the Ireland Shakespeare Forgeries

== Bibliography ==
- Alexander, David S. Angelica Kauffman: A Continental Artist in Georgian England. Reaktion Books, 1992.
- Kahan, Jeffrey. Reforging Shakespeare: The Story of a Theatrical Scandal. Lehigh University Press, 1998.
- Moyle, Franny. Mrs Kauffman and Madame Le Brun: The Entwined Lives of Two Great Eighteenth-Century Women Artists. Bloomsbury Publishing, 2025.
