= Mystic Marriage of Saint Catherine (Correggio, Naples) =

Painting by Correggio, c. 1520

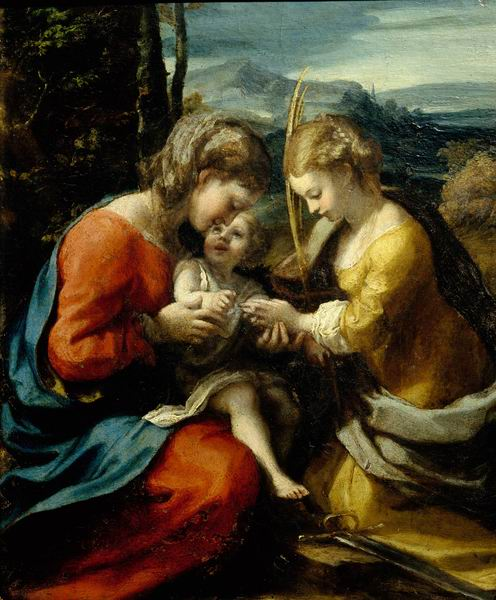

Mystic Marriage of Saint Catherine is a c.1520 oil on panel painting by Correggio, now in the National Museum of Capodimonte in Naples.

It is mentioned in an inventory of the goods of Barbara Sanseverino dated 27 April 1596 as "a painting by Correggio, called the Marriage of Saint Catherine, small but rejoicing in extreme beauty". Sanseverino offered it as a gift to Vincenzo I Gonzaga, who had a particular interest in works by Correggio, but the work did not reach Mantua. Instead it was requested by Odoardo Farnese in Rome - Correggio's reputation was then at its peak thanks to the popularity of the Carracci brothers and their school.

The work may have been the painting seen in the Palazzo del Giardino by Scannelli and described by him in 1657 in his Microcosmo or alternatively a small painting of the subject recorded in the Palazzo Farnese in Rome in 1644. In either case, a copy of the painting definitely stayed in Rome and belonged to Lelio Guidiccioni, a man of letters. Giovan Battista Mercati produced a print of it and dedicated it to Guidiccioni - this print is more faithful to the original than the earlier print by Giorgio Ghisi.

A copy of the painting is now in the Hermitage Museum and - according to an engraving of it by Moette - it has an inscription on the back reading “Laus Deo, per Donna Mathilda d'Este Antonio Lieto da Correggio fece il presente quadretto per sua divozione. A.o 1517”.

== Sources ==
- Data
- Image
