= Onorato Caetani (1742–1797) =

Italian scholar

Onorato Caetani (17 December 1742 - 26 June 1797) was an Italian scholar who was Principal of the Accademia degli Incolti in Rome in 1762. The academy was an institution founded by the Nazareno College originally dedicated to promoting a coherent balanced education.

Onorato was a younger son of Michaelangelo Caetani, Duke of Sermoneta, of the noble Caetani family. He studied the classics at the Nazareno College in addition to mathematics, physics and foreign languages and in 1764 graduated from the Sapienza University of Rome. He chose to follow an ecclesiastic career but never completed his studies. He was nevertheless appointed abbot of Valvisciolo Abbey. Between 1765 and 1772 he was Regent of the chancellery and in the latter year Pope Clement XIV named him a non-participating apostolic protonotary.

Between 1775 and 1785 he worked to create a large library in the family home. He attended cultural meetings and was a member of various academic societies. He commissioned the Swiss painter Angelika Kauffmann to paint two canvasses on subjects inspired by episodes of the novel The Adventures of Telemachus by François Fénelon. The resulting paintings are The Sorrow of Telemachus and Telemachus and the Nymphs of Calypso, both now in the collection of the Metropolitan Museum of Art.
