= Harris Masterson III =

- Born: July 9, 1914; Houston, Texas
- Died: April 7, 1997 (aged 82); Houston, Texas
- Known for: Contributions to the Arts

Harris "Harry" Masterson III (July 9, 1914 – April 7, 1997) was a philanthropist from Houston, Texas. Masterson was born in Houston in 1914. He received a Bachelor of Arts from Rice University in 1955. Masterson made contributions to the arts scene in Houston.

Masterson and his wife donated their residence Rienzi to the Museum of Fine Arts, Houston. The home was designed by architect John F. Staub. From 1958 to 1968 the Mastersons produced multiple Broadway shows, including Bajour.

In 1990, Harris and Carroll Masterson were awarded the National Medal of Arts as arts patrons. Masterson died in 1997. A large collection of his papers and other documents are kept at Rice University.
