= Thomas Burke (artist) =

Irish artist (1749–1815)

Thomas Burke (1749 – 31 December 1815) was an Irish engraver and painter.

== Life ==
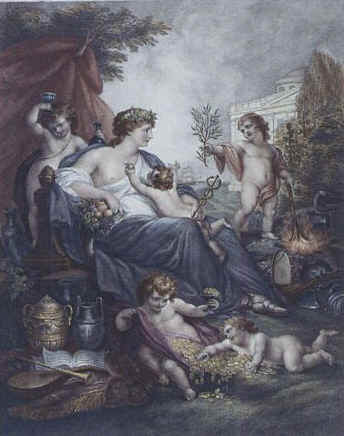
Untitled piece (1800) by Thomas Burke. The Graf von Galen Collection.

Born in Dublin in 1749, Burke first trained in the Dublin Society's Schools under Robert West, moving in 1770 to London where he studied mezzotint under John Dixon. Though he may have moved to London with Dixon as early as 1765. He adopted the chalk method popularised by Bartolozzi, continuing to use both styles.

Most of Burke's mezzotints were engraved after Angelica Kauffman for William Wynne Ryland, who taught him the stipple engraving technique. After 1775, Burke worked primarily by engraving in stipple, giving his work depth and richness. Burke preferred to work for publishers and seldom issued prints himself. His engravings typically featured subject pictures. The first engraving he did after Kauffman was Queen Charlotte Raising the Genius of the Fine Arts (1772). From 1775 to 1779, Burke did not sign his plates, starting to sign again with engravings for Ryland in 1779 and producing work for other publishers from 1782.

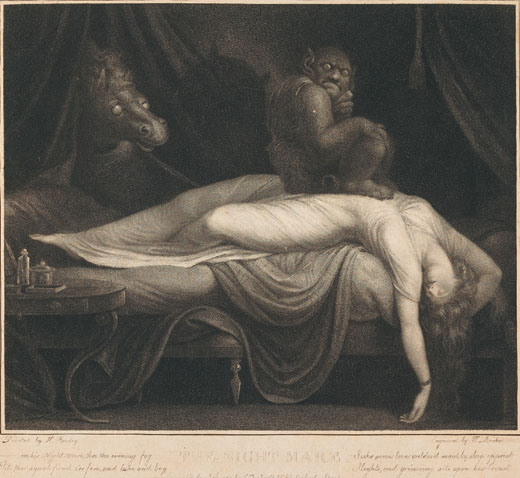
The Nightmare (1783), engraving after Fuseli

Burke's best known work was a popular print after Fuseli, The Nightmare (1783), showing an incubus sitting on a sleeping woman. The print was a best-seller across Europe.

In 1787, he was living at 5 Great College Street, Westminster. He was the preferred engraver of Kauffman, producing 28 stipples of her designs between 1779 and 1795. In 1797 described himself as Engraver to Ludwig X, Landgrave of Hesse Darmstadt. His last work was a portrait of Wellington dated 1815.

He died in London on 31 December 1815.
