= Christ and the Samaritan Woman (disambiguation) =

Christ and the Samaritan Woman, Christ and the Woman of Samaria and other variations are titles for artworks depicting the biblical episode of the Samaritan woman at the well. They include the following:

- Christ and the Samaritan Woman (Carracci)
- Christ and the Samaritan Woman (Artemisia Gentileschi)
- Christ and the Samaritan Woman (Kauffman)
- Christ and the Samaritan Woman (Meštrović)
- Christ and the Samaritan Woman (de Troy)
