= Domnina =

Domnina is the name of:

- Domnina (daughter of Nero), alleged daughter of Emperor Nero according to a Christian tradition
- St. Domnina of Terni, 3rd-century Christian martyr
- St. Domnina of Anazarbus, 3rd-century Christian martyr
- Sts. Domnina, Berenice, and Prosdoce, 4th-century martyrs
- St. Domnina of Syria, 5th-century ascetic
- Oksana Domnina, Russian ice dancer
