= The Judgement of Solomon (de Troy) =

Painting by Jean-François de Troy

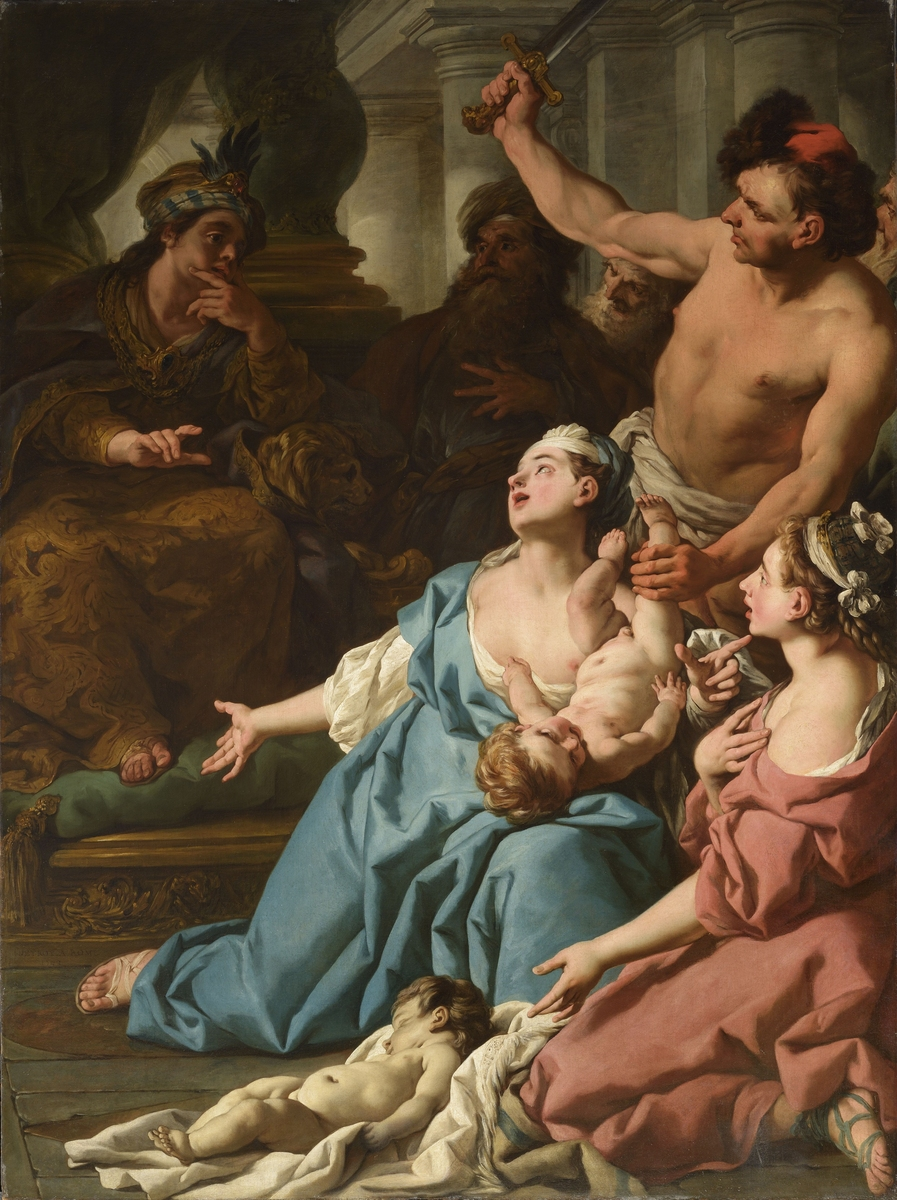
- Artist: Jean-François de Troy
- Year: 1742
- Medium: oil on canvas
- Dimensions: 191 cm × 143 cm (75 in × 56 in)
- Location: Museum of Fine Arts of Lyon, Lyon

The Judgement of Solomon is a 1742 painting of the Judgement of Solomon by the French painter Jean-François de Troy, produced in Rome as part of a commission from cardinal Pierre Guérin de Tencin for his archepiscopal palace in Lyon. The other paintings in the commission included Christ and the Samaritan Woman. Both works are now in the Museum of Fine Arts of Lyon.

== Description ==
The scene takes place in the palace of King Solomon as evidenced by the columns that we perceive in the background. The King wearing a robe and a turban is crouched in the shadows, seated on his throne with his two advisers. The painting is cut diagonally, highlighting the figures of the executioner, the two women and the newborn babies in the foreground. The executioner, his arm outstretched, firmly holds a knife in his right hand while looking at the King, as if awaiting his order of execution. With his left hand, he clasps the foot of the living child he is about to cut in half. The latter is placed between the two women, further emphasizing their feud. The first woman in the red dress appears pleading and points to the dead child lying at her feet. The second, wearing a blue dress, maintains a defensive position. Their two eyes converge on the King.
