= Christ and the Samaritan Woman (Artemisia Gentileschi) =

Painting by Artemisia Gentileschi

Christ and the Woman of Samaria
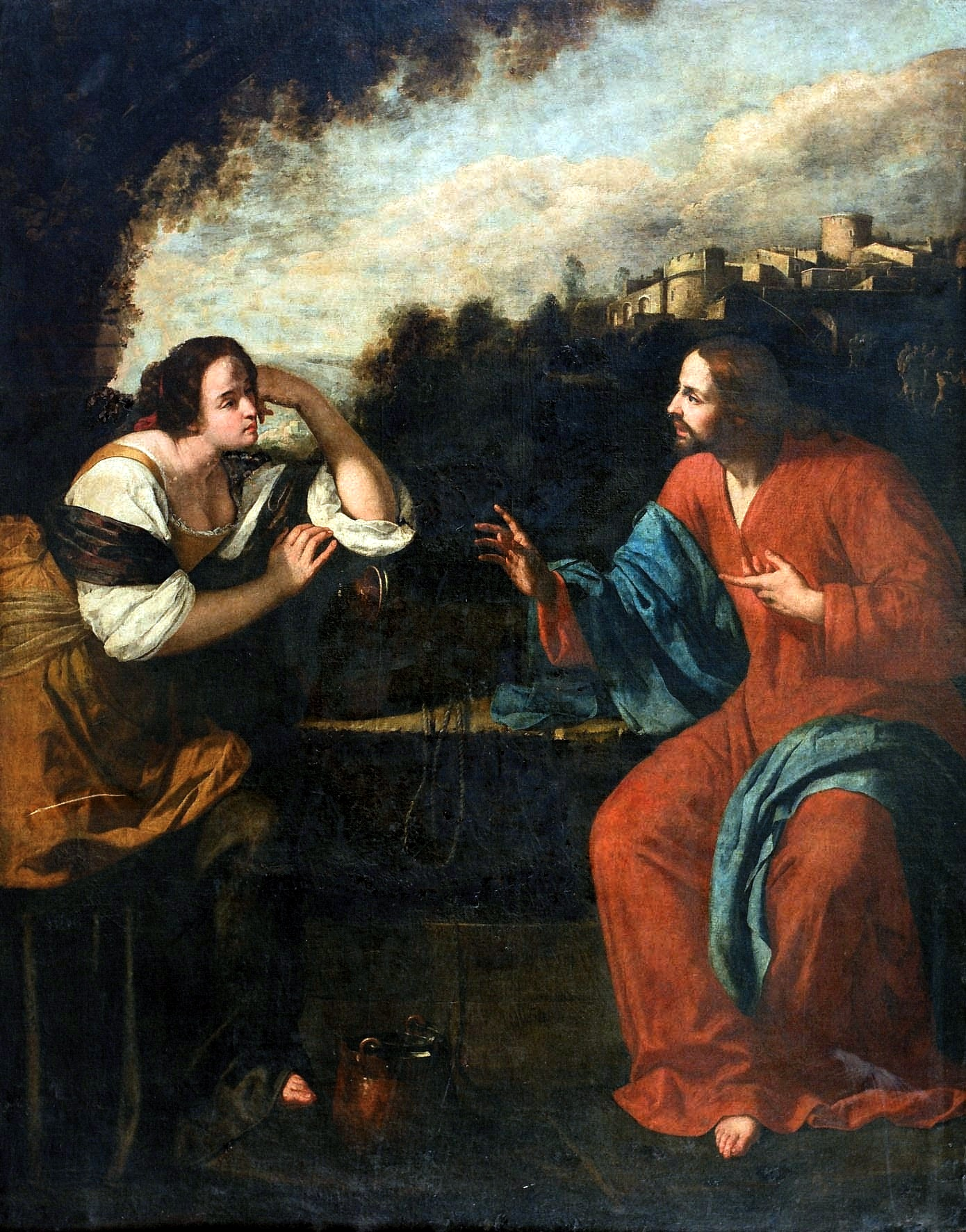
- Artist: Artemisia Gentileschi
- Year: 1637
- Medium: Oil on canvas
- Dimensions: 267.5 cm × 206 cm (105.3 in × 81 in)
- Location: Palazzo Blu, Pisa

Christ and the Woman of Samaria is a 1637 oil painting on canvas by the Italian artist Artemisia Gentileschi, depicting a story from the New Testament. It was part of a private collection in Palermo, and is now in the public Palazzo Blu in Pisa.

== Subject matter ==
The story of the Samaritan woman is told in the Gospel of John. A woman leans eagerly forward in conversation with Jesus, in contrast to the typical portrayal of the time which showed the woman sitting passively listening to a monologue. It is one of the few works by Gentileschi with a full landscape. The disciples of Jesus can be seen in the background, walking out of the walled city. The vibrant colors of the figures' clothes and the detailed landscape became associated with the work she produced during this period in Naples.

== Provenance ==
Correspondence from Gentileschi indicates that she was trying to sell two paintings to Cardinal Francesco Barberini in 1637, one of which was a Woman of Samaria. This work was recently discovered in a private collection and identified at that painting. The work apparently never reached Barberini and its history is otherwise undocumented. It was acquired by the Palazzo Blu museum in Pisa in November 2022.

== See also ==
- List of works by Artemisia Gentileschi

== Sources ==
- Locker, Jesse (2015). Artemisia Gentileschi : the Language of Painting. New Haven: Yale University Press. ISBN 9780300185119.
- Spear, Richard E. (2011). "Artemisia Gentileschi's 'Christ and the woman of Samaria'". The Burlington Magazine. 153 (1305): 804–805. ISSN 0007-6287.
