= Christ and the Samaritan Woman (de Troy) =

Painting by Jean-François de Troy

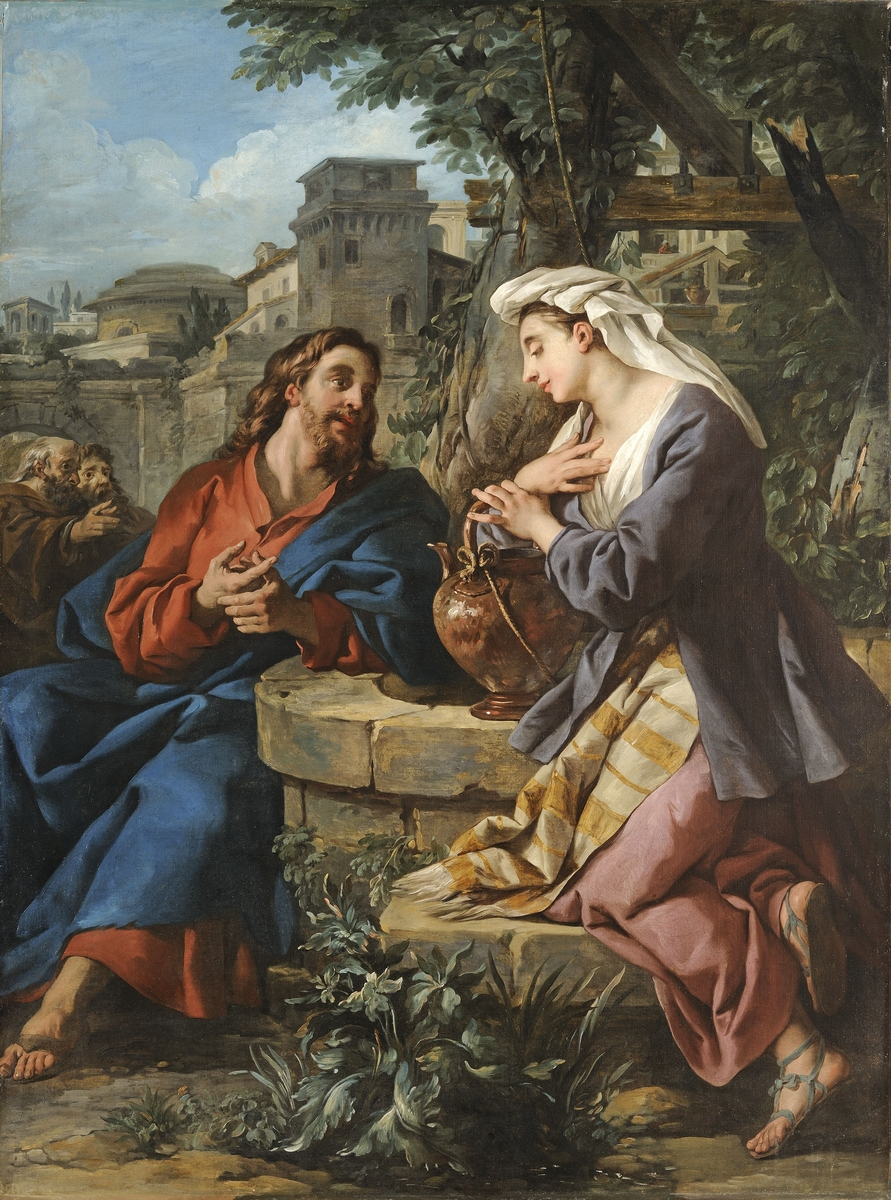
- Artist: Jean-François de Troy
- Year: 1742
- Medium: oil on canvas
- Dimensions: 1.96 cm × 1.87 cm (0.77 in × 0.74 in)
- Location: Museum of Fine Arts of Lyon, Lyon

Christ and the Samaritan Woman is a painting of 1742 by Jean-François de Troy depicting the biblical episode of the Samaritan woman at the well. It is one of a series of six paintings commissioned to the artist by Archbishop Pierre Guérin de Tencin and his archepiscopal palace at Lyon; the others were The Death of Lucretia, The Death of Cleopatra, The Judgement of Solomon, The Idolatry of Solomon and The Woman Caught in Adultery. It is now at the Museum of Fine Arts of Lyon.

== Description ==
The painting depicts Jesus seated near Jacob's Well in the foreground, conversing with the kneeling Samaritan woman. In the distance, the nearby city of Sychar, enclosed within its ramparts, stretches along a hill. At the left, two Apostles of Jesus, depicted as bearded men returning from the city, observe the scene with expressions and gestures of astonishment and disapproval. The life-size figures appear cramped, filling the entire frame of the painting. Rather than focusing on historical accuracy, de Troy emphasizes the picturesque and exotic details in the settings, clothing, and hairstyles of the biblical figures.
