= Jesus's interactions with women =

Element of the life of Jesus of Nazareth

Jesus's interactions with women are an important element in the theological debate about Christianity and women. Women are prominent in the story of Jesus. According to the resurrection story, the resurrected Jesus was first seen by women.

== High number of references to women ==
According to New Testament scholar Frank Stagg and classicist Evelyn Stagg, the synoptic Gospels of the canonical New Testament contain a relatively high number of references to women. Evangelical Bible scholar Gilbert Bilezikian agrees, especially by comparison with literary works of the same epoch. Neither the Staggs nor Bilezikian find any recorded instance where Jesus disgraces, belittles, reproaches, or stereotypes a woman. These writers claim that examples of the manner of Jesus are instructive for inferring his attitudes toward women and show repeatedly how he liberated and affirmed women. Starr writes that of all founders of religions and religious sects, Jesus stands alone as the one who did not discriminate in some way against women. By word or deed he never encouraged the disparagement of a woman. Karen King concludes, based on the account of Jesus's interaction with a Syrophoenician woman in Mark 7:24–30 and Matthew 15:21–28, that "an unnamed Gentile woman taught Jesus that the ministry of God is not limited to particular groups and persons, but belongs to all who have faith."

== Women as disciples ==
The gospels of the New Testament, written toward the last quarter of the first century AD, often mention Jesus speaking to women publicly and openly against the social norms of the time. From the beginning, Jewish women disciples, including Mary Magdalene, Joanna, Susanna, and Salome had accompanied Jesus during his ministry and supported him out of their private means.

Kenneth E. Bailey spent 40 years as a Presbyterian professor of New Testament in Egypt, Lebanon, Jerusalem and Cyprus. He writes about Christianity from a Middle Eastern cultural view. He finds evidence in several New Testament passages that Jesus had women disciples. He first cites the reported occasion when Jesus's family appeared and asked to speak with him. Jesus replied:

"Who is my mother, and who are my brothers?" And stretching out his hand towards his disciples, he said, "Here are my mother and my brothers! For whoever does the will of my Father in heaven is my brother, and sister, and mother."

— Matthew 12:46–50, emphasis added by Bailey

Bailey argues that according to Middle Eastern customs, Jesus could not properly have gestured to a crowd of men and said, "Here are my brother, and sister, and mother." He could only have said that to a crowd of both men and women. Therefore, the disciples standing before him were composed of men and women.

== Women of obscurity noticed by Jesus ==
The Gospels record several instances where Jesus reaches out to "unnoticeable" women, inconspicuous silent sufferers who blend into the background and are seen by others as "negligible entities destined to exist on the fringes of life". Jesus notices them, recognizes their need and, "in one gloriously wrenching moment, He thrusts them on center stage in the drama of redemption with the spotlights of eternity beaming down upon them, and He immortalizes them in sacred history".

=== Peter's mother-in-law ===
The three synoptic gospels all record the healing of Simon Peter's mother-in-law. When Jesus came into Peter's house, he saw Peter's mother-in-law lying in bed with a fever. He healed the woman of fever by touching her hand. She rose and began to wait on him. With this particular healing, something unique occurs. Quite often, after being healed, people left Jesus to go about their renewed lives. Peter's mother-in-law, however, immediately rose and began to "serve" him.

=== The woman who touched Jesus's garment ===
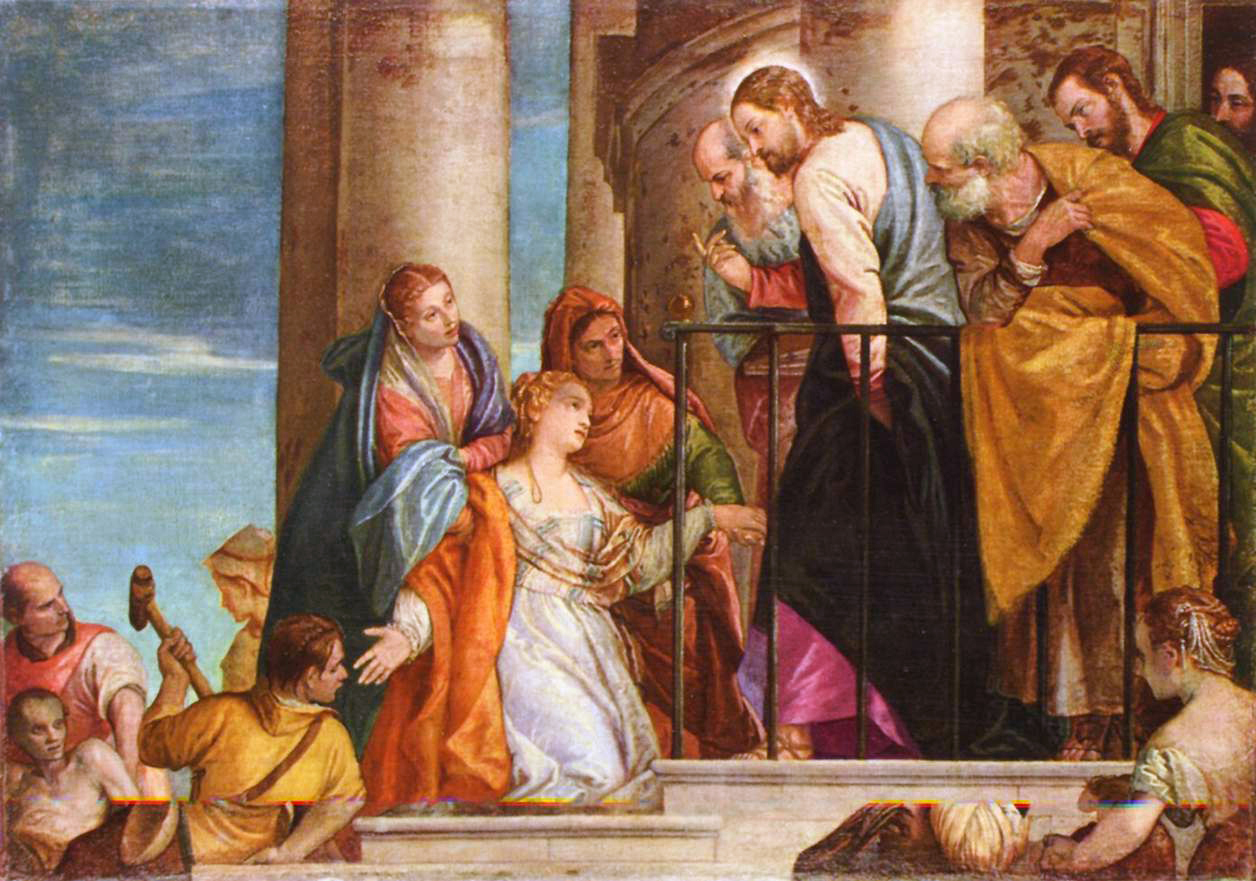
Illustration by Paolo Veronese of Jesus healing the woman with a flow of blood

Jesus practised the ministry of touch, sometimes touching the "untouchables" and letting them touch him. Among the things considered defiling (disqualifying one for the rituals of religion) was an issue of blood, especially menstruation or hemorrhage. One such woman had been plagued with a flow of blood for 12 years, no one having been able to heal her. She found the faith in a crowd to force her way up to Jesus, approaching him from behind so as to remain inconspicuous, and simply touching his garment. When she did, two things happened: the flows of blood stopped and she was discovered.

Jesus turned and asked who touched him. The disciples tried to brush aside the question, protesting that in such a crowd no individual could be singled out. Jesus pressed his inquiry and the woman came and trembled at his feet; she explained her reason and declared amid the crowd what blessing had come to her. Jesus treated her as having worth, not rebuking her for what the Levitical code of holiness would have considered as defiling him. Rather, he relieved her of any sense of guilt for her seemingly rash act, lifted her up and called her "Daughter". He told her that her faith saved her, gave her his love, and sent her away whole.

Fontaine writes, "The 'chutzpah' shown by the woman who bled for 12 years as she wrests her salvation from the healer's cloak is as much a measure of her desperation as it is a testimony to her faith." Fontaine comments that "the Bible views women as a group of people who are fulfilled, legitimated, given full membership into their community, and cared for in old age by their children," and that barren women risked ostracism from their communities. She notes that when disabled people are healed, the act "emphasizes primarily the remarkable compassion of the one doing the good deed, not the deserving nature or dignity of the recipient".

=== Daughter of Jairus ===
Jairus was one of the rulers of the Jewish synagogue, and had a daughter who had been very ill and was now at the point of death. She was an only daughter, and was twelve years of age. So hearing that Jesus was near, Jairus came to Jesus, and, falling down before him, implored Jesus to come and see his sick daughter. She had been comatose, and in Matthew 9:18 her father says she is already dead. Jesus went to her, even though the others mocked him and said it was too late. When he saw her body, he took her by the hand and said to her, "Talitha koum," which means, "Little girl, I say to you, arise!" She immediately arose and walked around. He gave strict orders that no one should know this and said that she should be given something to eat.

=== Widow of Nain ===
The widow lived in a remote small town on a hillside in Galilee. However, the death of her only son left her with little means of support. Jesus noticed the grieving woman in the funeral procession. Jesus gave the command "Arise!" and gave the bewildered son back to his mother. "They all knew that God had a special love for the little widow with one son in Nain of Galilee."

=== The woman bent double ===
Jesus was teaching in a synagogue on the Sabbath and saw a woman who had been "crippled by a spirit for eighteen years". She was bent over and could not straighten up at all. He called to the woman, said "Woman, you are set free from your infirmity", then laid his hands on her body, and immediately she straightened up and praised God.

The synagogue ruler, the defender of the Sabbath, was indignant because Jesus had healed on the Sabbath. Rather than confront Jesus, he rebuked the woman publicly by saying to the whole congregation, "There are six days for work. So come and be healed on those days, not on the Sabbath". In response, Jesus said, "You hypocrites! Doesn't each of you on the Sabbath untie his ox or donkey from the stall and lead it out to give it water? Then should not this woman, a daughter of Abraham, whom Satan has kept bound for eighteen long years, be set free on the Sabbath day from what bound her?" The Staggs emphasize that this is the only reference in New Testament to "a daughter of Abraham". They conclude that Jesus spoke of this woman as though she belonged to the family of Abraham just as much as did the sons of Abraham.

== Women as models of faith ==
Jesus who always kept his covenant of chastity presented women as models of faith to his listeners. In the culture of the day, women were neither to be seen nor heard since they were considered "corrupting influences to be shunned and disdained".

=== A poor widow's offering ===
Jesus honours a poor widow who cast "two copper coins" into the Temple treasury. What the widow gave to God was the totality of her belongings. Women had only limited access to the Temple in Jerusalem. There Jesus found the most praiseworthy piety and sacrificial giving, not in the rich contributors, but in a poor woman.

== Women as models of Jesus's work ==
In the Parable of the Lost Coin and the Parable of the Leaven, Jesus presents his own work and the growth of the Kingdom of God in terms of a woman and her domestic work. These parables follow the Parable of the Lost Sheep and the Parable of the Mustard Seed respectively, and share the same messages as their more male-oriented counterparts.

Joel B. Green writes of the Parable of the Leaven that Jesus "asks people—male or female, privileged or peasant, it does not matter—to enter the domain of a first-century woman and household cook in order to gain perspective on the domain of God".

== Women as persons of value ==
=== Raising their dead ===
The Gospels describe three miracles of Jesus raising persons from the dead. In two out of those three incidents the dead are restored to women—to Mary and Martha their brother Lazarus and to the unnamed widow from Nain her only son.

=== Warning against lust ===
In the Sermon on the Mount, Jesus expounded upon the Ten Commandments. He defended the value of women and men by equating lust to adultery.

=== Warning against divorce ===
Jesus expounded upon the Book of Deuteronomy. Regarding men's custom of divorce, he defended the rights of wives by equating unjustified divorce with the guilt of causing the sin of adultery.

== Women as first resurrection witnesses ==
After the Resurrection of Jesus, he chose to appear first to a group of women and gave them the privilege of proclaiming his resurrection and communicating his instructions to the Apostles. In the story, appearing first to them implies his claim was not dishonest because a rational deceiver would not appear to witnesses that could not testify in court (i.e., the group of women).

== Mary, mother of Jesus ==
=== At the Temple in Jerusalem ===
The canonical Gospels offer only one story about Jesus as a boy—Luke's story about the boy Jesus in the Jerusalem Temple. According to Luke, his parents, Joseph and Mary, took the 12-year-old Jesus to Jerusalem on their annual pilgrimage to the Passover. Mary and Joseph started their journey home without Jesus, thinking he was somewhere in the caravan with kinsmen or acquaintances. When his parents found him three days later, Mary said, "Son, why have you treated us like this? Your father and I have been anxiously searching for you." The boy Jesus respectfully but firmly reminded her of a higher claim he must answer: "Didn't you know I had to be about my Father's business?" It is noteworthy that in obedience to his parents, Jesus left and was subject to them.

=== At the wedding in Cana of Galilee ===
Mary told Jesus the wine was in short supply. Today his reply may seem curt: "Woman, what have I to do with you? My hour is not yet come."

Neither here nor elsewhere does Jesus renounce the mother-son relationship as such, but here, as in Luke 2:49 he declares his vocational (ministerial) independence of his mother. He has an "hour" to meet, and Mary, though his mother, can neither hasten nor hinder its coming.

Most scholars believe that in Jesus's reply to his mother there was no disrespect. According to Matthew Henry's Commentary, he used the same word when speaking to Mary with affection from the cross. Scholar Lyn M. Bechtel disagrees with this reading. She writes that the use of the word "woman" in reference to Jesus's mother is "startling. Although it would not be improper or disrespectful to address an ordinary woman in this way (as he often does), (Note: Jesus often referred to women in this way; see John 4:21, John 8:10, John 20:13–15) it is inappropriate to call his mother 'woman'". Bechtel further argues that this is a device Jesus uses to distance himself from Judaism.

However, Bishop William Temple says there is no English phrase that represents the original "Woman, leave me to myself." "In the Greek it is perfectly respectful and can even be tender—as in John 19:27... We have no corresponding term; 'lady' is precious, and 'madam' is formal. So we must translate simply and let the context give the tone." Some versions of the Bible translate it as "Dear woman". (Note: As in the New Living Translation, New Century Version and the Amplified Bible.)

=== At the foot of the cross ===
Jesus, being Mary's firstborn son, took the responsibility of caring for his ageing mother's future. Soon before he died, Jesus made arrangements for the disciple whom Jesus loved to take care of her.

== Mary Magdalene ==
Mary Magdalene (also called Miriam of Magdala) is among the women depicted in the New Testament who accompanied Jesus and his twelve apostles, and who also helped to support the men financially. According to Mark 15:40, Matthew 27:56, John 19:25, and Luke 23:49, she was one of the women who remained at Jesus's crucifixion. The New Testament says she saw Jesus laid in a tomb. Mark 16:9 reports that after his resurrection, Jesus appeared first to Mary Magdalene. The New Testament also says that Jesus had cast seven demons out of her, as it says in verse Luke 8:2.

For centuries, Mary Magdalene was identified in Western Christianity as an adulteress and repentant prostitute, although nowhere does the New Testament identify her as such. In the late 20th century, discoveries of new texts and changing critical insight brought this into question. According to Harvard theologian Dr. Karen King, Mary Magdalene was a prominent disciple and leader of one wing of the early Christian movement that promoted women's leadership.

King cites references in the Gospel of John that the risen Jesus gives Mary special teaching and commissions her as an "apostle to the apostles". She is the first to announce the resurrection and to play the role of an apostle, although the term is not specifically used of her (though, in Eastern Christianity she is referred to as "Equal to the Apostles"). Later tradition, however, names her as an "apostle to the apostles". King writes that the strength of this literary tradition makes it possible to suggest that historically Mary was a prophetic visionary and leader within one sector of the early Christian movement after the death of Jesus. Asbury Theological Seminary Bible scholar Ben Witherington III confirms the New Testament account of Mary Magdalene as historical: "Mary was an important early disciple and witness for Jesus." He continues, "There is absolutely no early historical evidence that Miriam's (Mary's) relationship with Jesus was anything other than that of a disciple to her Master teacher."

Jeffrey Kripal, Chair of Rice University's Department of Religious Studies, writes that Christian Gnostic texts put Mary Magdalene in a central position of authority, but these texts were excluded from orthodox Biblical canons. Kripal describes Mary Magdalene as a tragic figure who maintained an important role later diminished by the male church leadership. Kripal explains that gnostic texts suggest an intimate, possibly sexual relationship between Jesus and Mary Magdalene, but that Jesus's sexuality is absolutely ambiguous based on the available evidence: "The historical sources are simply too contradictory and simultaneously too silent on the matter".

According to Kripal, the gnostic texts "consistently [present] Mary as an inspired visionary, as a potent spiritual guide, as Jesus' intimate companion, even as the interpreter of his teaching". Kripal writes that theologies of the European Middle Ages likely invented the notion of a sexual relationship between Mary Magdalene and Jesus: "The medieval Catharists and Albigensians, for example, held that Mary was Jesus's concubine. The great Protestant reformer Martin Luther also assumed a sexual relationship between the two, perhaps to give some historical precedent for his own dramatic rejection of Catholic celibacy".

== The woman taken in adultery ==
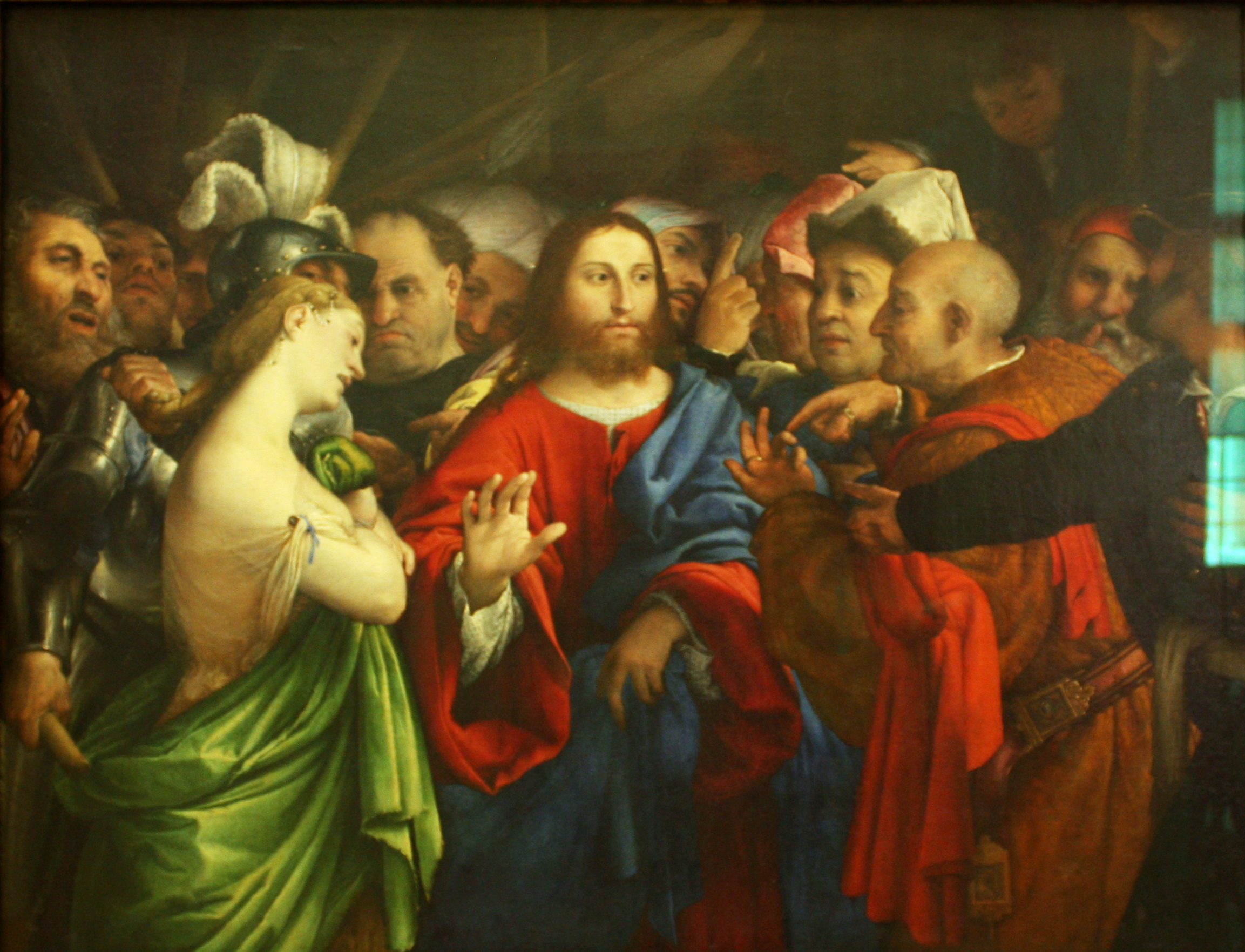
The Woman Taken in Adultery, 1520s by Lorenzo Lotto

The story of the woman taken in adultery is found only in the Gospel of John. In the story, Jesus was teaching in the Temple in Jerusalem. Some scribes and Pharisees interrupted his teaching as they brought in a woman who had been taken in the very act of adultery. They stood her before him, declared the charge, reminded him of Moses' command that such women be stoned; the law speaks of the death of both the man and the woman involved (though the man was not brought in along with the woman).

The Pharisees asked Jesus his opinion on what to do about the woman's adultery; if he expressed a lax opinion, then he would be condemned for his dismissal of Mosaic law, but if he expressed the opinion the Pharisees shared – that the woman should be stoned – then they would prevail. After a time of silence, Jesus stooped down and wrote with his finger on the ground. It was unlawful to write even two letters on the Sabbath, but writing with dust was permissible. The text includes no hint of what he wrote. Finally, Jesus stood up and said to the accusers; "Let the one among you who is without sin cast the first stone." He stooped down once more and again wrote on the ground. In his answer Jesus did not condone adultery. He compelled her accusers to judge themselves and find themselves guilty—of this sin and/or others. No one could pass the test, and they slipped out one by one, beginning with the eldest.

When Jesus and the woman were finally alone, he asked her, "Woman, where are they? Did no one condemn you?" She simply replied, "No one, Lord." Jesus says to her, "Neither do I condemn you. Go, and from now on no longer sin."

Augustine, commenting on this passage, opines that "Here is mercy and righteousness. He condemned the sin and not the sinner." Expanding upon this, Jesus called her to a new life. While acknowledging that she had sinned, he turned her in a new direction with encouragement. Jesus rejected the double standard for women and men and turned the judgement upon the male accusers. His manner with the sinful woman was such that she found herself challenged to a new self-understanding and a new life.

== The woman at the well in Samaria ==
John 4:1–42

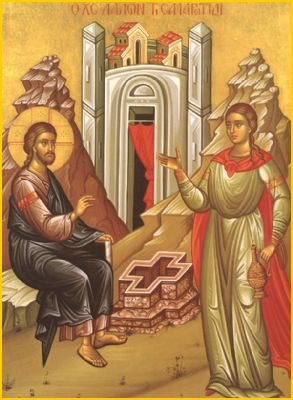
Orthodox icon of Photina, the Samaritan woman, meeting Jesus by the well.

The in-depth account about Jesus and the Samaritan Woman at the Well is highly significant for understanding Jesus in several relationships: Samaritans, women, and sinners. By talking openly with this woman, Jesus crossed a number of barriers which normally would have separated a Jewish teacher from such a person as this woman of Samaria. Jesus did three things that were highly unconventional and astonishing for his cultural-religious situation:

1. He as a man discussed theology openly with a woman.
2. He as a Jew asked to drink from the ritually unclean bucket of a Samaritan.
3. He did not avoid her, even though he knew her marital record of having had five former husbands and now living with a man who was not her husband.

The disciples showed their astonishment upon their return to the well: "They were marveling that he was talking with a woman. A man in the Jewish world did not normally talk with a woman in public, not even with his own wife. For a rabbi to discuss theology with a woman was even more unconventional. Jesus did not defer to a woman simply because she was a woman. He did not hesitate to ask of the woman that she let him drink from her vessel, but he also did not hesitate to offer her a drink of another kind from a Jewish "bucket" as he said to her, "Salvation is of the Jews." Salvation was coming to the Samaritan woman from the Jews, and culturally there was great enmity between the Jews and the Samaritans (considered a half-breed race by the Jews). Although she was a Samaritan, she needed to be able to drink from a Jewish "vessel" (of salvation) and Jesus no more sanctioned Samaritan prejudice against Jew than Jewish prejudice against Samaritan.

This is an event without precedent: that a woman, and what is more a "sinful woman", becomes a "disciple" of Christ. Indeed, once taught, she proclaims Christ to the inhabitants of Samaria so that they too receive him with faith. This is an unprecedented event, if one remembers the usual way women were treated by those who were teachers in Israel; whereas in Jesus of Nazareth's way of acting such an event becomes normal.

— Pope John Paul II

The key to Jesus's stance is found in his perceiving persons as persons. He saw the stranger at the well as someone who first and foremost was a person—not primarily a Samaritan, a woman, or a sinner. This evangelized woman became an evangelist. She introduced her community to "a man" whom they came to acclaim as "the Savior of the world." Jesus liberated this woman and awakened her to a new life in which not only did she receive but also gave. The Bible says she brought "many Samaritans" to faith in Christ. If the men in John 1 were the first "soul winners", this woman was the first "evangelist" in John's gospel.

== The woman from Syrophoenicia ==
Matthew 15:21–28, Mark 7:24–30

This incident is unlike any other in the canonical Gospels. The woman, whose little daughter was possessed by an impure spirit, came and fell at his feet. The woman was a Gentile, born in Syrian Phoenicia. She begged Jesus to drive the demon out of her daughter. Jesus seems harsh toward the woman as he first denies her request for help for her daughter. He also appears to be condescending and denigrating of her as he says, "First let the children be fed, for it is not fitting to take the bread of the children and throw it to the dogs." In the context, "the children" seem to be Jews, and "the dogs" Gentiles.

She is identified as "a Gentile, of Syrophoenician origin". The point is not that she is a woman, but that she is not Jewish, but a Gentile. "Dogs" was epithet of the day for Gentiles, and Jesus appears to be on the side of Jewish contempt for Gentiles. In both Mark and Matthew, non-Jews are likened to "dogs", and a woman deeply concerned for her daughter's condition is brushed off until she herself prevails in her discourse with Jesus.

As to the manner of Jesus with women, he did not substitute uncritical deference for prejudice against women. He related to women as persons with words and dignity. In this story as elsewhere, Jesus is seen as capable of manifesting a critical stance toward woman, yet at the same time being respectful of her self-affirmation as she boldly countered his own remarks.

Why Jesus appeared harsh to a disadvantaged person, and also seems to lose the brief spirited and incisive dialog with her is still debated among authorities. Several interpretations have been offered by theologians.

Evelyn and Frank Stagg suggest three possibilities:

1. Jesus could have been instructing his disciples, first assuming a familiar Jewish prejudice toward non-Jews, and then abandoning it as its unfairness was exposed. The story may have served as an object lesson about prejudice to his disciples as a barrier is broken down between Jews and Gentiles.
2. Jesus may have been testing the woman's faith. Jesus's parting word to her is one of affirmation and acclaim. She passed his test.
3. There may have been a deep struggle within Jesus as he dealt with the claims of both Jew and Gentile. He had openness to Jews who were outside of accepted circles (publicans, sinners, prostitutes). He also went out of his way to affirm Samaritans (for example, the woman at the well). As an ethnic group, Samaritans had mutual animosity with the Jews. It is clear that Jesus had to give himself unreservedly to Israel, and yet also to the rest of the world. Jesus may have been having a deep, honest struggle within himself over the claims of two worlds upon him.

Gilbert Bilezekian believes Jesus's seemingly indifferent attitude to the woman's plea and the strange dialogue that followed should not be interpreted as reluctance on his part to minister either to Gentiles or to a woman. He focuses on her faith, which Jesus later describes as "great". Wanting her to state her understanding of his ministry, he drew out her convictions and provided an opportunity to teach a lesson of racial inclusiveness to his "intolerant disciples". She expressed her faith that Gentiles have a share in salvation, confessing that his messiahship transcends human segregations of Jew, Gentile, man or woman. She was his first convert in the "Gentile world".

== Mary and Martha ==
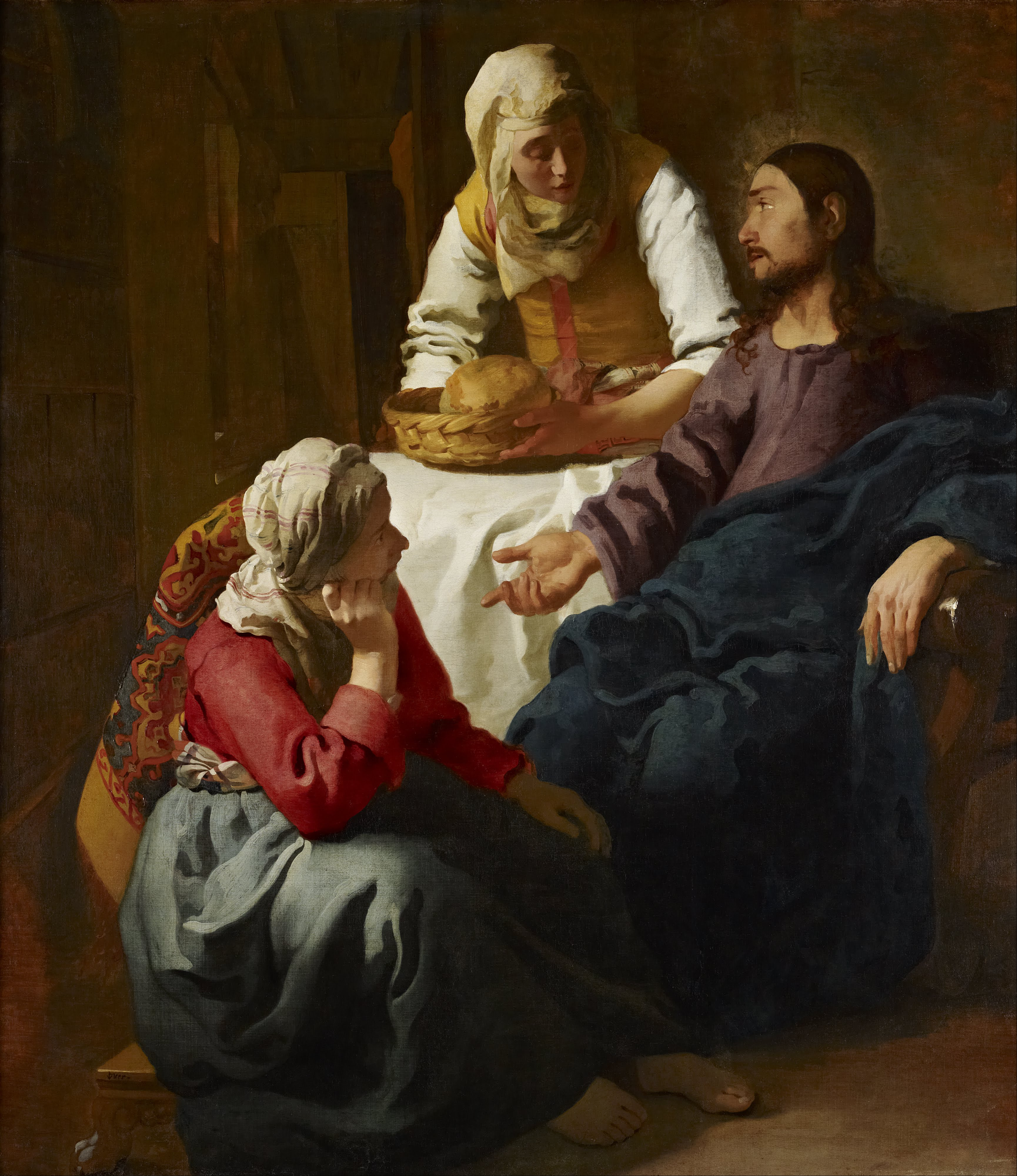
Christ in the House of Martha and Mary by Jan Vermeer, 1655

Luke and John show that Jesus had a close relationship with the sisters Mary of Bethany and Martha who resided in Bethany. They are featured in three major stories:

1. A tension between the two sisters over roles
2. Grief at the death of their brother Lazarus, followed by his being raised, and
3. Martha serving and Mary anointing Jesus (explicitly in John 12:1–8); presumably in Mark 14:3–9; Matthew 26:6–13). See the anointing in Bethany.

=== Kitchen and study ===
Luke 10:38–42

Luke relates an occasion of tension during one of Jesus's visits to the home of Martha and Mary. While Martha prepared the meal, Mary sat at the feet of Jesus and "she was hearing his word." Martha became distracted and frustrated over having to serve the meal without any help from her sister. Finally she openly shared her feelings, stood over Jesus who was either seated or reclining, and complained: "She came to him and asked, "Lord, don't you care that my sister has left me to do the work by myself? Tell her to help me!" Jesus gently rebuked Martha for being so distracted and troubled over many things, when only one thing was necessary. "Martha, Martha," the Lord answered, "you are worried and upset about many things, but only one thing is needed. Mary has chosen what is better, and it will not be taken away from her."

Mary's choice was not a conventional one for Jewish women. She sat at the feet of Jesus and was listening to his teaching and religious instruction. Jewish women were not permitted to touch the Scriptures; they were not taught the Torah, although they were instructed in accordance with it for the proper regulation of their lives. A rabbi did not instruct a woman in the Torah. Mary choose the "good part", but Jesus related it to her in a teacher-discipleship relationship. He admitted her into "the study" and commended her for her choice. In the tradition of that day, women were excluded from the altar-oriented priestly ministry, and the exclusion encroached upon the Word-oriented ministry for women. Jesus reopened the Word-ministry for women. Mary was at least one of his students in theology.

Jesus vindicated Mary's rights to be her own person—to be Mary and not Martha. He showed his approval of a woman's right to opt for the study and not be compelled to be in the kitchen. Jesus established his own priorities in declaring, "Man shall not live by bread alone, but by every word proceeding out through the mouth of God. Martha needed to be reminded of the priority of Word over bread. Luke's account of Jesus at the home of Mary and Martha puts Jesus solidly on the side of the recognition of the full personhood of woman, with the right to options for her own life. By socializing with both sisters and in defending Mary's right to a role then commonly denied to Jewish women, Jesus was following his far-reaching principle of human liberation.

=== The grieving sisters ===
John 11:1–44

One of Jesus's miracles was raising Lazarus from four days in the tomb. This serves as a reminder, that, while God works all things for the best, he doesn't always do it according to the schedules expected.

Jesus's followers had given up hope after Lazarus' death, but Jesus had a plan to glorify God and heal Lazarus in a more spectacular way than anyone expected. The central figure, however, is Jesus, identified as "the resurrection and the life". When the brother of Mary and Martha became ill, they sent for Jesus. For some undisclosed reason, Jesus did not arrive until four days after Lazarus died. The grieving sisters, Martha first and then Mary, met Jesus. Jesus raised Lazarus from the dead and then proclaimed himself as "the resurrection and the life". Martha gently reproached Jesus, "Lord, had you been here, my brother would not have died." She hastened to express full confidence that God would grant whatever Jesus asked him to grant. Martha reflected a spiritual understanding beyond that required for preparing and serving a meal.

Apparently, Martha and not just Mary had benefited from the study. Mary stayed in the house until Jesus called for her. When Martha went to get her, Mary came quickly fell at Jesus's feet (Mary is at the feet of Jesus in every appearance recorded in John's gospel). She repeated the words Martha already had used: "Lord, had you been here my brother would not have died." Jesus was deeply moved upon seeing Mary and her friends weeping. They invited Jesus to come and see the tomb where Lazarus had been laid. Jesus burst into tears. The Jews standing by understood this as reflecting Jesus's love for Lazarus, "see how he loved him" (v. 36). The foursome of Jesus, Mary, Lazarus, and Martha had a close relationship as persons, with neither denial of gender differences nor preoccupation with it. Here were persons of both genders whose mutual respect, friendship and love carried them through experiences of tension, grief, and joy. Apparently Jesus was secure enough to develop such a relationship with two sisters and their brother without fear for his reputation. When necessary, he could oppose them without fear of chauvinism. Jesus had much to do with the liberation and growth of Martha and Mary.

In the account of the raising of Lazarus, Jesus meets with the sisters in turn: Martha followed by Mary. Martha goes immediately to meet Jesus as he arrives, while Mary waits until she is called. As one commentator notes, "Martha, the more aggressive sister, went to meet Jesus, while quiet and contemplative Mary stayed home. This portrayal of the sisters agrees with that found in Luke 10:38–42." When Mary meets Jesus, she falls at his feet. In speaking with Jesus, both sisters lament that he did not arrive in time to prevent their brother's death: "Lord, if you had been here, my brother would not have died." But where Jesus's response to Martha is one of teaching calling her to hope and faith, his response to Mary is more emotional: "When Jesus saw her weeping, and the Jews who had come along with her also weeping, he was deeply moved in spirit and troubled. As the 17th-century British commentator Matthew Henry notes, "Mary added no more, as Martha did; but it appears, by what follows, that what she fell short in words she made up in tears; she said less than Martha, but wept more."

== Women who anointed Jesus ==
The Gospels present two stories of Jesus being anointed by a woman: (1) three accounts of his being anointed in Bethany, only John's account identifying Mary with the anointing; and (2) one account of Jesus being anointed by a sinful woman who definitely was neither Mary (of Mary and Martha) nor Mary Magdalene.

The Eastern Orthodox Church views Mary Magdalene, Mary of Bethany, and the "sinful woman" as three different individuals, and also maintains that Jesus was anointed on two different occasions: once by Mary of Bethany and once by the "sinful woman".

=== The anointings in Bethany ===
Matthew 26:6–13, Mark 14:3–9, John 12:1–8

Jesus is quoted in Matthew as assuring that the story of a woman's sacrificial love and devotion to him will have a place in the gospel wherever preached. Mary probably anticipated Jesus's death, but that is not certain. At least her beautiful deed gave Jesus needed support as he approached his awaited hour. Each of the two sisters Mary and Martha had their own way of ministering to Jesus: Martha, perhaps being more practical, served him a meal; Mary lavishly anointed him.

A narrative in which Mary of Bethany plays a central role (in at least one of the accounts) is the event reported by the Synoptic Gospels and the Gospel of John in which a woman pours the entire contents of an alabastron of very expensive perfume over the head of Jesus. Only in the John account is the woman identified as Mary, with the earlier reference in Jn. 11:1–2 establishing her as the sister of Martha and Lazarus. The woman's name in not given in the Gospels of Matthew and Mark. According to Mark's account, the perfume was the purest of spikenard. Some of the onlookers are angered because this expensive perfume could have been sold for a year's wages, which Mark enumerates as 300 denarii, and the money given to the poor.

The Gospel of Matthew states that the "disciples were indignant" and John's gospel states that it was Judas who was most offended (which is explained by the narrator as being because Judas was a thief and desired the money for himself). In the accounts, Jesus justifies Mary's action by stating that they would always have the poor among them and would be able to help them whenever they desired, but that he would not always be with them. He says that her anointing was done to prepare him for his burial. "Mary seems to have been the only one who was sensitive to the impending death of Jesus and who was willing to give a material expression of her esteem for him. Jesus's reply shows his appreciation of her act of devotion."

Easton (1897) noted that it would appear from the circumstances that the family of Lazarus possessed a family vault and that a large number of Jews from Jerusalem came to console them on the death of Lazarus, that this family at Bethany belonged to the wealthier class of the people. This may help explain how Mary of Bethany could afford to possess quantities of expensive perfume.

=== The anointing by a repentant sinner ===
Luke 7:36–50

In the Gospel of Luke, Jesus is an invited guest in the home of Simon the Pharisee. All at the table were men. During the meal a woman known as "a sinner" entered the room and anointed Jesus's feet with her tears and with some ointment. Her tears fell upon his feet and she wiped them with her hair.

The Bible does not say whether she had encountered Jesus in person prior to this. Neither does the Bible disclose the nature of her sin. Women of the time had few options to support themselves financially; thus, her sin may have been prostitution. Had she been an adulteress, she would have been stoned.

When Jesus permitted her to express her love and appreciation to him as she did, the host rejected it. Knowing his unconditional love for both saints and sinners, the woman had took a risk to publicly express her love for him for him seeing her not as a sex object to be exploited, but as a person of worth.

== Women who ministered with Jesus ==
Luke 8:1–3

Luke's gospel is unique in documenting that there were many women who benefited personally from Jesus's ministry, but who also ministered to him and with him—even to the point of accompanying him and the Twelve on evangelistic journeys. Most prominent among these is Mary Magdalene.

Luke 8:1–3 in the Greek text is one long sentence. Its three main focal points are Jesus, the Twelve, and certain women. Jesus is traveling through cities and towns, preaching the Kingdom of God, evangelizing, and accompanied by the Twelve. Other than mentioning that the Twelve were with him, nothing more is said of them here.

The chief motive of the paragraph seems to be to bring into focus certain women, of whom there were "many". This passage presents them as recipients of healing at different levels of need, and also as actively participating with Jesus and the Twelve, accompanying them in their travels. Luke makes special reference to the financial support of these women to Jesus's ministry. He says there were many women. He points out that these included women who were prominent in the public life of the state as well as in the church.

Luke's account specifies two categories of healing: evil spirits and infirmities. Jesus liberated and humanized people who otherwise were being enslaved or destroyed by forces within themselves and in society. Jesus healed many women of "evil spirits and infirmities". Only of Mary Magdalene does Luke provide any detail of her healing, stating that "seven demons" had been cast out. Presumably these "many" women had been healed of various illnesses—physical, emotional, and mental. No specific data is provided on Mary Magdalene's "seven demons". It is significant that women whose conditions subjected them to scorn and penalty found in Jesus a Liberator who not only enabled them to find health, but who dignified them as full persons by accepting their own ministries to himself and to the Twelve.

Thus, it is significant that women had such an open and prominent part in the ministry of Jesus. Luke's word for their "ministering" is widely used in the New Testament. Its noun cognate, diakonos, is variously translated "minister", "servant", and "deacon" (the latter for Phoebe in Romans 16:1 and in the pastoral letters).

That women played such an active and important role in Jesus' ministry was not entirely radical or even unique; inscriptions from a synagogue in Aphrodisias in Asia Minor from around the same time period reveal that many of the major donors to the synagogue were women. However, Jesus' ministry may have offered women more freedom than mainstream Jewish society.

In summary, Jesus attracted to his movement a large number of women, ranging from some in desperate need to some in official circles of government.

== Jesus on family relationships ==
Jesus ate with a Pharisee leader one evening. After instructing his host to include the most disadvantaged in his feasts, Jesus gave a parable of the many personal reasons why guests might refuse an invitation, including marriage and recent financial acquisitions. Jesus then addresses a great multitude and says, "If anyone comes to me and does not hate father and mother, wife and children, brothers and sisters—yes, even life itself—such a person cannot be my disciple."

Various expositors suggest that "hate" is an example of comparative hyperbolic biblical language, prominent in some Eastern cultures even today, to imply "love less than you give me", "compared to Christ", the Semitic idea of "lower preference", a call to count the cost of following Jesus.

When Jesus was told that his mother and brothers waited for him outside and wanted to speak to him, Jesus created a novel definition of family. He said to the people who were gathered to hear him speak, "Who is my mother? and who are my brethren? And he stretched forth his hand toward his disciples, and said, 'Behold my mother and my brethren! For whosoever shall do the will of my Father which is in heaven, the same is my brother, and sister, and mother.'"

== Twelve and no women (and no Gentiles) ==
There were no women among the Twelve, and neither were there any Gentiles. All four listings in the New Testament of the names of the Twelve indicate that all of the Twelve were Jewish males:

- Matthew 10:1–4
- Mark 3:13–19
- Luke 6:12–16
- Acts 1:13

The names vary in the four lists, but their male identity is clear and is often cited as biblical evidence that pastors should all be male. The New Testament gives no clear answer why the example of Jesus in choosing his apostles is not a complete overcoming of male bias.

Several considerations may be placed alongside this one. Jesus advanced various principles that went beyond their immediate implementation. For example, he clearly repudiated the Jew–Samaritan antipathy, affirming not only his own Jewish kin but also the Samaritan. Yet, there are no Samaritans among the Twelve. Jesus affirmed both women and Samaritans as persons having the fullest right to identity, freedom, and responsibility, but for some undisclosed reason(s) he included neither women nor Gentiles in his close circle of the Twelve.

Perhaps custom here was so entrenched that Jesus simply stopped short of fully implementing a principle that he made explicit and emphatic: "Whoever does the will of God is my brother, and sister, and mother."

By selecting 12 Jewish males, Jesus may have been offering a parallel to the 12 patriarchs or 12 tribes of Israel, each headed by a son of Jacob.

Another possible explanation surrounds the purpose stated for his choosing the Twelve: "...so that they might be with him". They were his constant companions day and night—except when he sent them out to preach. It was the custom for Jewish rabbis to have such an entourage of disciples. "Such close and sustained association with a member of the opposite sex would have given rise to defamatory rumor."

However the restriction of the Twelve to Jewish men is to be accounted for, Jesus did introduce far-reaching principles which bore fruit even in a former rabbi, the Apostle Paul, who at least in vision could say, "There is not any Jew nor Greek, not any slave nor free, there is not male and female; for you are all one in Christ Jesus." Further, the inclusion of "many" women in the traveling company of Jesus represents a decisive move in the formation of a new community. The Twelve are all men and also are all Jews, but even at this point women "minister" to them.

The Staggs' believe a likely explanation to be that Jesus began where he was, within the structures of Judaism as he knew it in his upbringing. His closest companions initially may have been Jews, men, and men of about his own age. He began there, but he did not stop there. Even in the early stages of his mission, women were becoming deeply involved at the power center of Jesus's movement.

Fulton Sheen wrote extensively on this subject and believed that Jesus preached to the Jews first because they were the people promised the Messiah. In the same way that they received the Good News first, before it was preached to the rest of the Gentile world, so too Jesus's 12 Apostles were all Jews. This did not bar Gentiles from being accepted into the Church, nor from being ordained. However, the choosing of women apostles would not have interfered with the preferential treatment of Jews in Jesus's mission, and the Church understands His choice to exclude women from the priesthood He founded to be divinely inspired and set for all time.

== See also ==
- Female disciples of Jesus
- Christian feminism
- Myrrhbearers
