= Domnina (daughter of Nero) =

Christian daughter of the Roman Emperor Nero

According to a Christian tradition, recorded in The Posthumous Miracles of St. Photeine, Domnina, daughter of the Roman emperor Nero, was converted in to Christianity along with her hundred slave girls, by the samaritan woman Photina. According to the tradition, Domnina ordered that all the tempting gold jewelry she and her servants had to be sold and the money distributed to the poor. In one version the converted Domnina took the name Anthousa.

Domnina is not recorded in historical sources, and the story is likely a Christian myth dating to late antiquity, or to the Middle Ages. Nero's only recorded daughter was named Claudia Augusta, and died in infancy.

A daughter of Nero's is also mentioned in some versions of the medieval fable of 'Virgil in the basket', as the lady who is the subject of the poet's affections. Such tales often blend fact with fiction and freely conflate and combine items from different eras of history, without regard for the actual chronology.
