= Samaritan woman at the well =

Figure in the Gospel of John

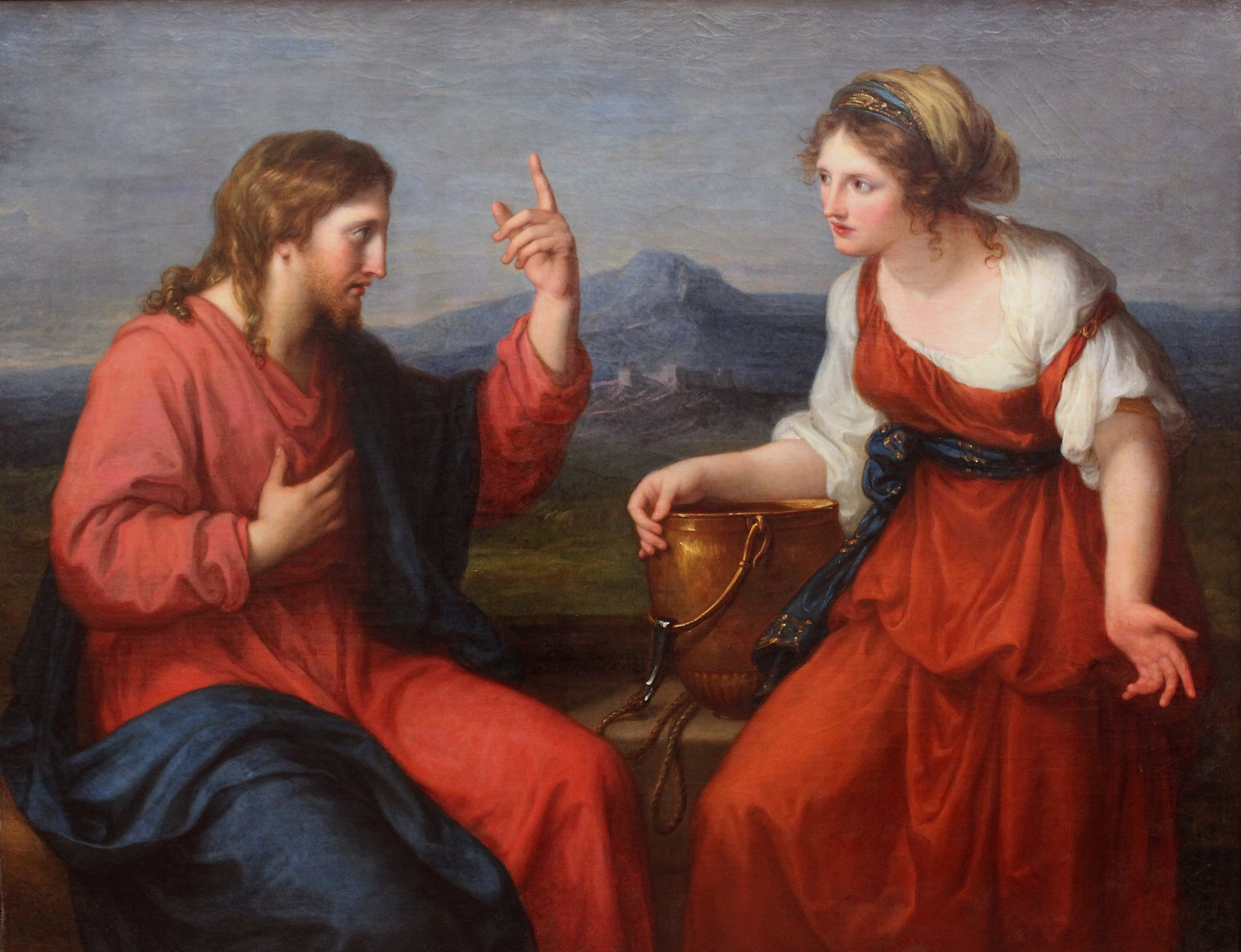
The Water of Life Discourse between Jesus and the Samaritan Woman at the Well by Angelika Kauffmann, 17th–18th century

The Samaritan woman at the well, also known as Photini of Samaria, is a figure from the Gospel of John. John 4:4–42 relates her conversation with Jesus at Jacob's Well near the city of Sychar or Shechem.

== Biblical account ==
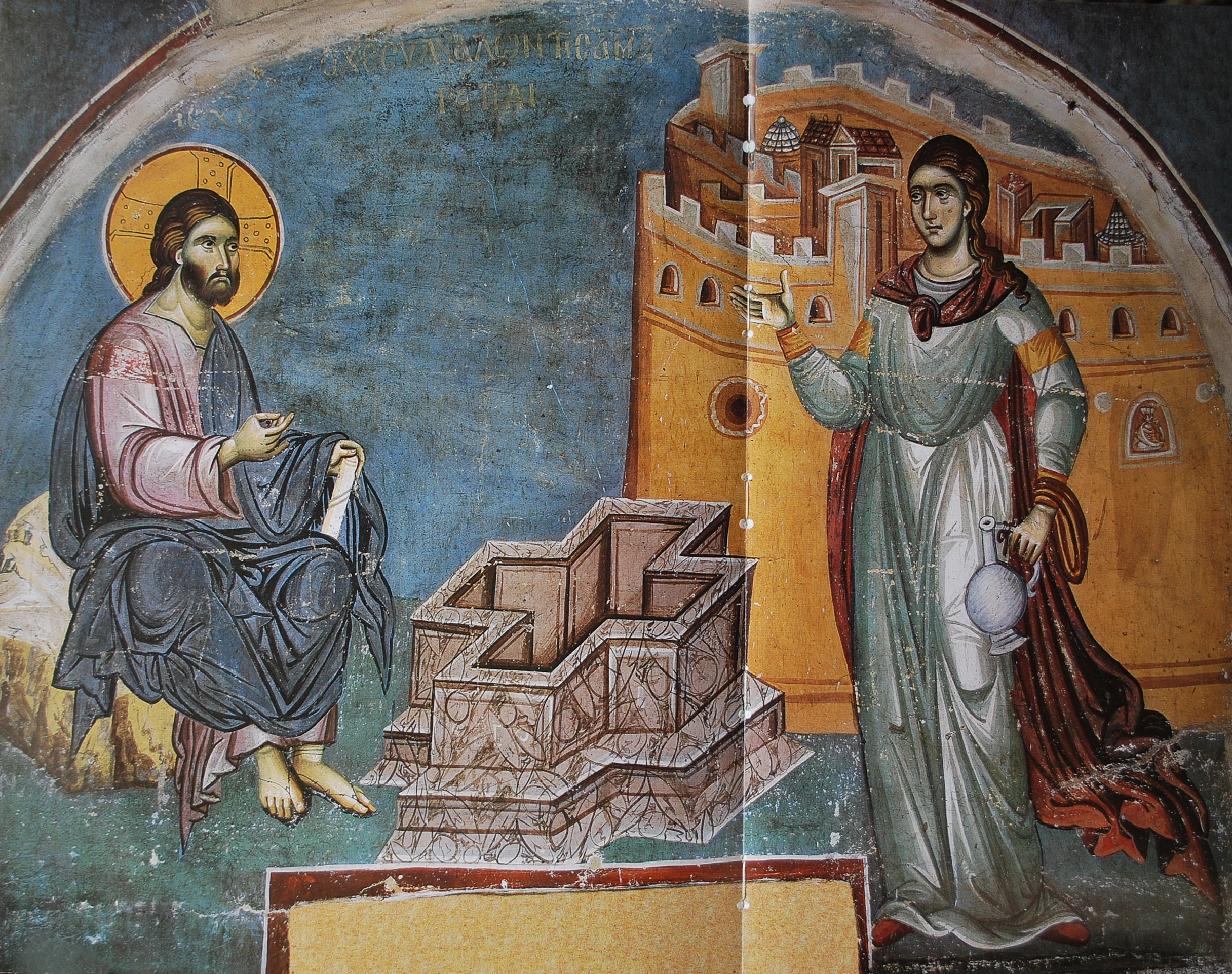
Eastern Orthodox fresco of Saint Photine meeting Christ

The World English Bible's text reads:

He needed to pass through Samaria. So he came to a city of Samaria called Sychar, near the parcel of ground that Jacob gave to his son Joseph. Jacob’s well was there. Jesus therefore, being tired from his journey, sat down by the well. It was about the sixth hour. A woman of Samaria came to draw water. Jesus said to her, "Give me a drink." For his disciples had gone away into the city to buy food.

The Samaritan woman therefore said to him, "How is it that you, being a Jew, ask for a drink from me, a Samaritan woman?" (For Jews have no dealings with Samaritans.)

Jesus answered her, "If you knew the gift of God, and who it is who says to you, 'Give me a drink', you would have asked him, and he would have given you living water." The woman said to him, "Sir, you have nothing to draw with, and the well is deep. So where do you get that living water? Are you greater than our father Jacob, who gave us the well and drank from it himself, as did his children and his livestock?" Jesus answered her, "Everyone who drinks of this water will thirst again, but whoever drinks of the water that I will give him will never thirst again; but the water that I will give him will become in him a well of water springing up to eternal life."

The woman said to him, "Sir, give me this water, so that I don't get thirsty, neither come all the way here to draw."

Jesus said to her, "Go, call your husband, and come here." The woman answered, "I have no husband." Jesus said to her, "You said well, 'I have no husband', for you have had five husbands; and he whom you now have is not your husband. This you have said truly."

The woman said to him, "Sir, I perceive that you are a prophet. Our fathers worshiped in this mountain, and you Jews say that in Jerusalem is the place where people ought to worship".

Jesus said to her, "Woman, believe me, the hour is coming when neither in this mountain nor in Jerusalem will you worship the Father. You worship that which you don't know. We worship that which we know; for salvation is from the Jews. But the hour comes, and now is, when the true worshipers will worship the Father in spirit and truth, for the Father seeks such to be his worshipers. God is spirit, and those who worship him must worship in spirit and truth."

The woman said to him, "I know that Messiah is coming, he who is called Christ. When he has come, he will declare to us all things." Jesus said to her, "I am he, the one who speaks to you."

This episode takes place before the return of Jesus to Galilee. Some Jews regarded the Samaritans as foreigners and their attitude was often hostile, although they shared most beliefs, while many other Jews accepted Samaritans as either fellow Jews or as Samaritan Israelites. The two communities seem to have drifted apart in the post-exilic period. Both communities share the Pentateuch, although crucially the Samaritan Pentateuch locates the holy mountain at Mount Gerizim rather than at Mount Zion, as this incident acknowledges in verse 20, "Our ancestors worshiped on this mountain, but you Jews claim that the place where we must worship is in Jerusalem".

The Gospel of John, like the Gospel of Luke, is favourable to the Samaritans throughout, and, while the Gospel of Matthew quotes Jesus at one early phase in his ministry telling his followers not at that time to evangelize any of the cities of the Samaritans, this restriction had clearly been reversed later by the time of Matthew 28:19. Scholars differ as to whether the Samaritan references in the New Testament are historical. One view is that the historical Jesus had no contact with Samaritans; another is that the accounts go back to Jesus himself. In Acts 1:8, Jesus promises the apostles that they will be witnesses to the Samaritans.

== Interpretations ==
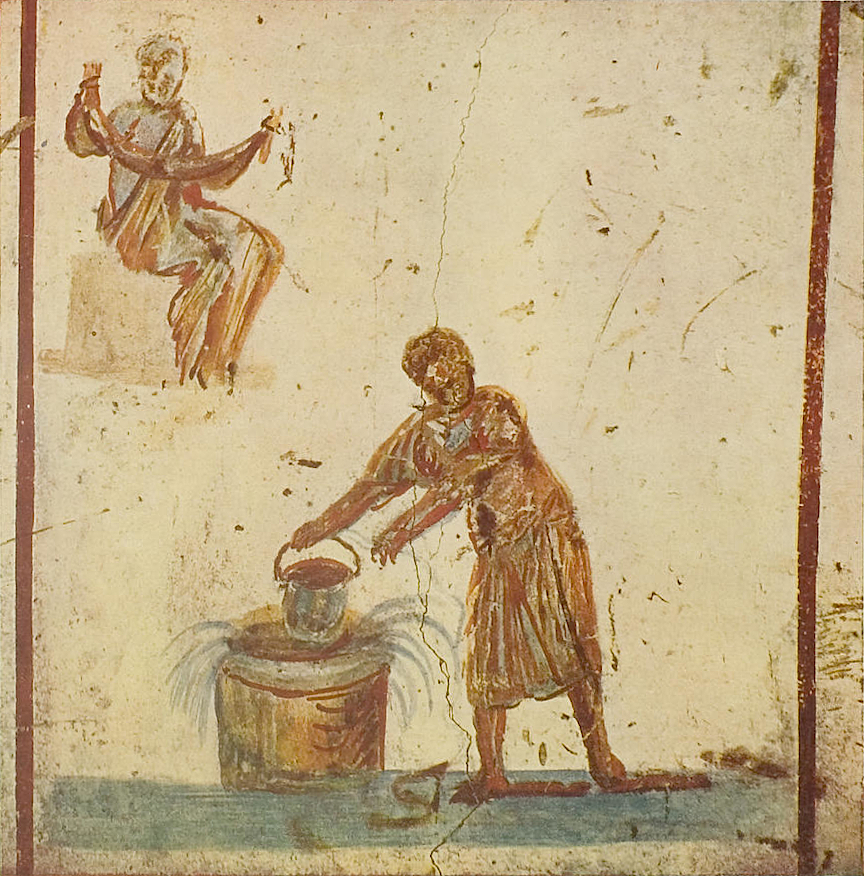
2nd century A.D., Rome. Christ and the Samaritan woman drawing water, Catacomb of Callistus. An early Christian painting illustrating the Biblical story.

Scholars have noted that this story appears to be modelled on a standard betrothal 'type scene' from Hebrew scripture, particularly that of Jacob in Genesis 29. This convention, which would have been familiar to Jewish readers, following on from an earlier scene in which John the Baptist compares his relationship to Jesus with that of the friend of a bridegroom. Jo-Ann A. Brant, for example, concludes that there is "near consensus among literary critics that the scene at Jacob's well follows conventions of the betrothal type-scene found in Hebrew narrative." Other scholars note significant differences between John 4 and betrothal type-scenes in the Hebrew Bible. For example, Dorothy A. Lee lists several discrepancies between Hebrew betrothal scenes and John 4: "the Samaritan woman is not a young Jewish virgin and no betrothal takes place; the well is not concerned with sexual fertility but is an image of salvation (see Isa. 12:3); Jesus is presented not as a bridegroom but as giver of living water."

This Gospel episode is referred to as "a paradigm for our engagement with truth", in the Roman Curia book A Christian reflection on the New Age, as the dialogue says: "You worship what you do not know; we worship what we know" and offers an example of "Jesus Christ the bearer of the water of life". The passages that comprise John 4:10–26 are sometimes referred to as the Water of Life Discourse, which forms a complement to the Bread of Life Discourse.

Roger Baxter comments in his Meditations on this passage, saying:

Consider the excellence of this living water, which is Divine grace, and which Christ promises to His faithful servants. "He that shall drink of the water that I will give him, shall not thirst forever." It quenches, therefore, forever, the thirst of the soul, and satisfies it. The soul then no longer thirsts after earthly waters, that is, the pleasures of this world. It becomes a fountain of all good to the soul, ever flowing and giving merit to our actions." It springs up to everlasting life" (John iv. 14), elevating our thoughts to heaven and heavenly joys, of which it is a pledge. Say, therefore, with the Samaritan woman, " Give me this water, that I may not thirst."

== Veneration ==
Saint Photini of Samaria
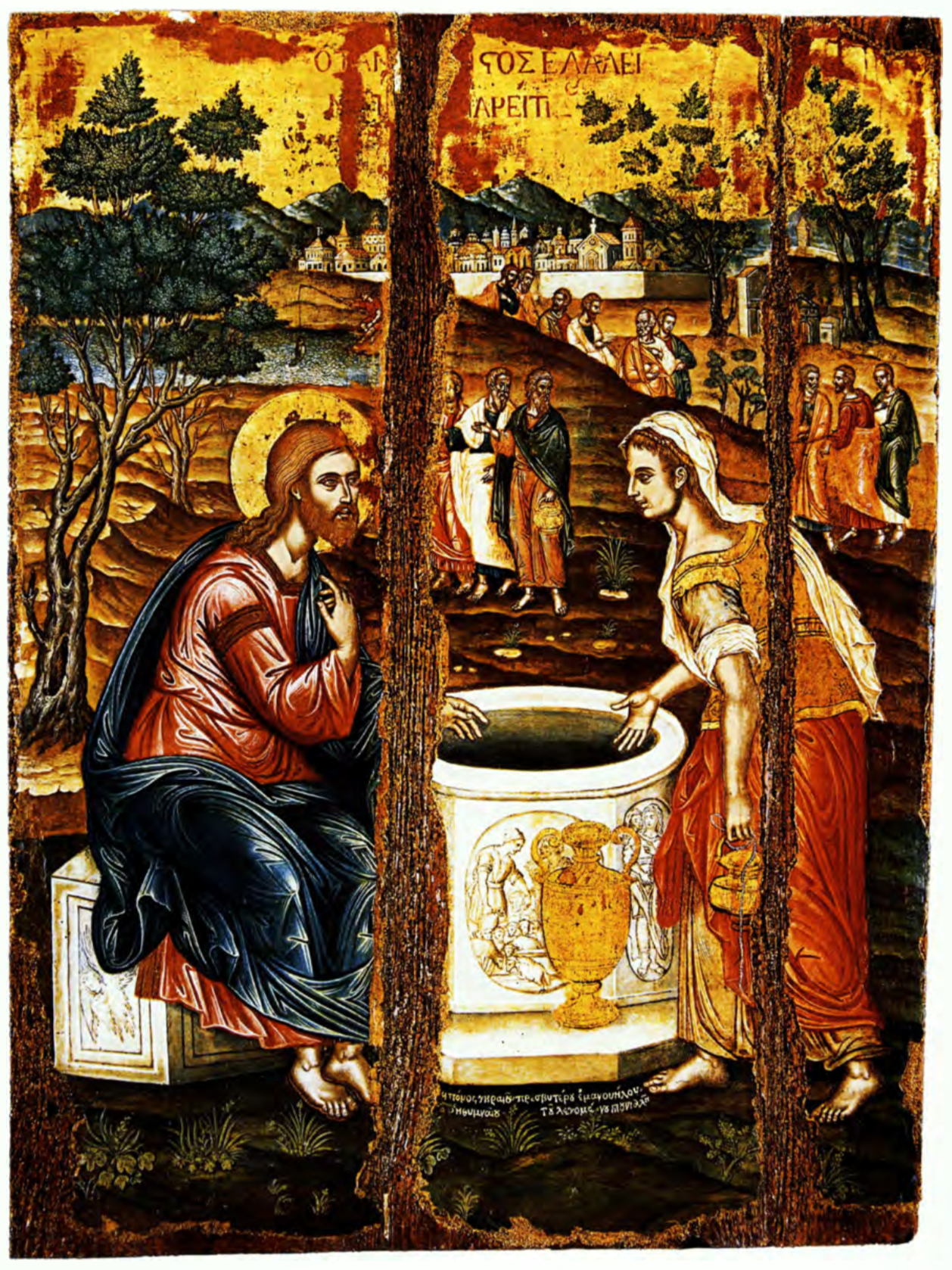
- Samaritan Woman at the Well made in 1689 by Emmanuel Tzanes

Martyr, Equal to the Apostles
- Venerated in: Eastern Orthodox Church; Eastern Catholic Churches; Roman Catholic Church; Episcopal Church (United States)
- Feast: Eastern Orthodoxy: Fourth Sunday after Pascha (Sunday of the Samaritan Woman), February 26 (Greek Tradition), March 20 (Slavic Tradition); Western Churches: Fourth Friday of Lent (Oaxaca), February 26 (Episcopal Church)

In Eastern Orthodox tradition, the woman at the well is venerated as a saint with the name Photini (Φωτεινή), meaning "enlightened [one]" or literally, "luminous [one]". (Note: Pronounced Fotini in Modern Greek, also Photinā in Doric Greek and some modern dialects, meaning "the luminous one" from φῶς, 'light'). Diminutives in Modern Greek include Φωτούλα, Φωτεινούλα, Φώρη, Φώφη, Φώτο, Φαίη (Fotoula, Foteinoula, Fori, Fofi, Foto, Faye).) In Catholic tradition, older editions of the Roman Martyrology list a martyr named Photina of Samaria on March 20, whom commentators have identified with the woman at the well.

In Eastern Christian tradition, the woman's name at the time of her meeting Jesus is unknown, though she was later baptized "Photini" by the Apostles, because she understood Jesus' identity as the Messiah. She is celebrated as a saint of renown. As further recounted in John 4:28–30, and John 4:39–42, she was quick to spread the news of her meeting with Jesus, and through this many came to believe in him. Her continuing witness is said to have brought so many to the Christian faith that she is described as "equal to the apostles". Eventually, having drawn the attention of Emperor Nero, she was brought before him to answer for her faith, suffering many tortures and dying a martyr after being thrown down a dry well. She is remembered on the Sunday four weeks after Pascha, which is known as "the Sunday of the Samaritan Woman".

In Oaxaca, Mexico, a celebration of the Samaritan woman takes place on the fourth Friday of Lent. The custom of the day involves churches, schools, and businesses giving away fruit drinks to passers-by.

Photini, The Samaritan Woman is honored with a Lesser Feast on the liturgical calendar of the Episcopal Church in the United States of America on February 26. In that tradition, her year of death is given as circa 67.

== Cultural references ==
=== In visual art ===
Jesus and the Samaritan Woman at the Well

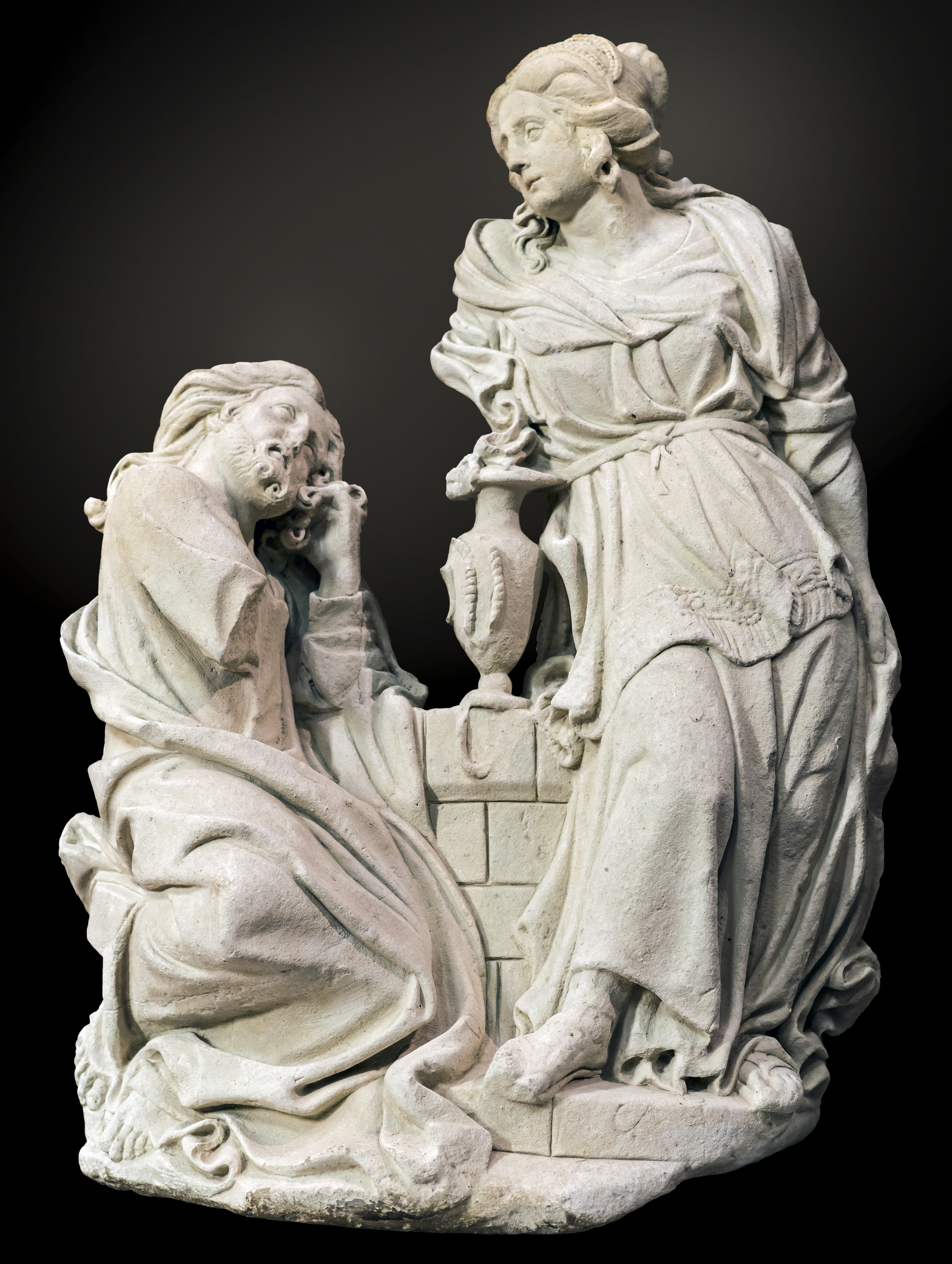
Samaritan woman at the well 1651 by Gervais Drouet

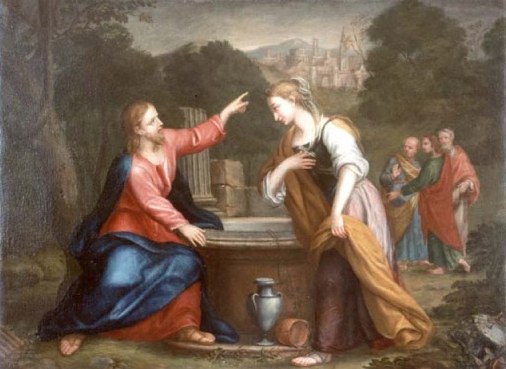
Jesus and the Samaritan Woman at the Well, by Giacomo Franceschini

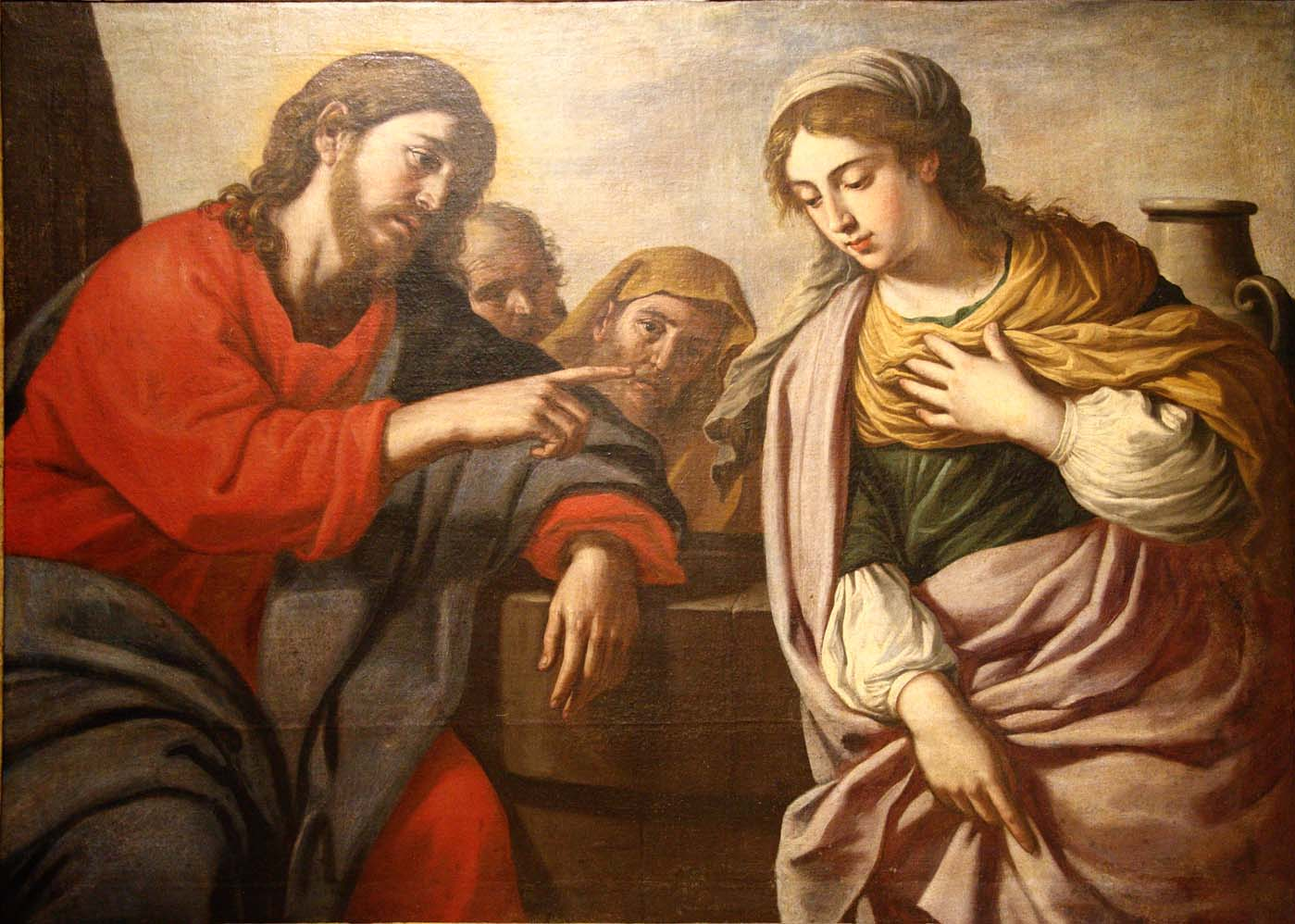
Christ and the Samaritan Woman, by Stefano Erardi

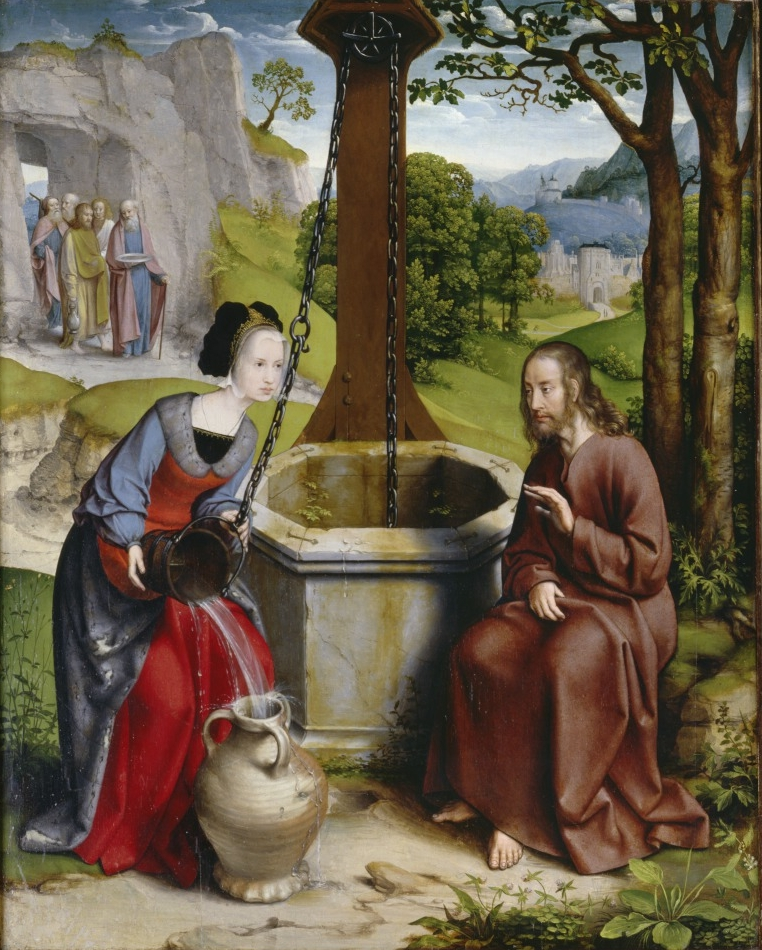
Christ and the Samaritan Woman, by Jan Joest van Kalkar

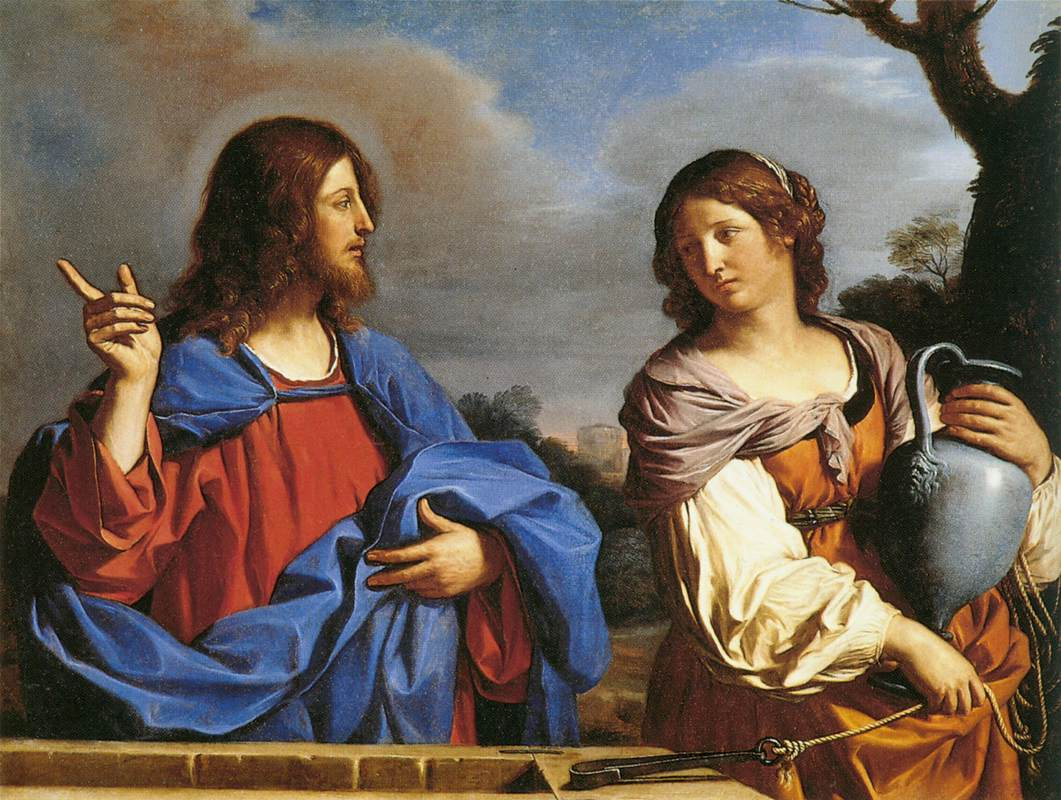
Jesus and the Samaritan Woman at the Well, by Guercino

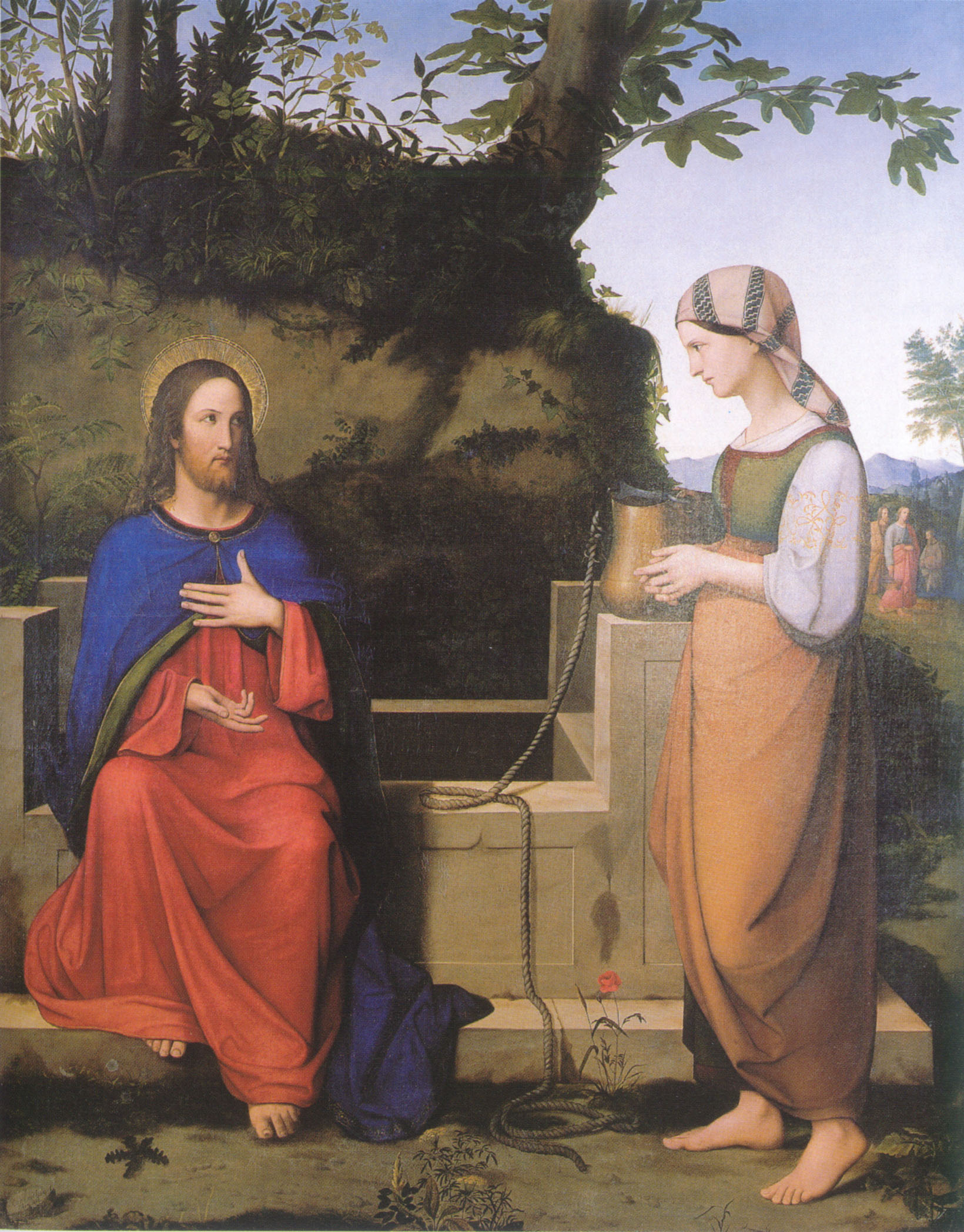
Christ and the Samaritan Woman, by Josef von Hempel

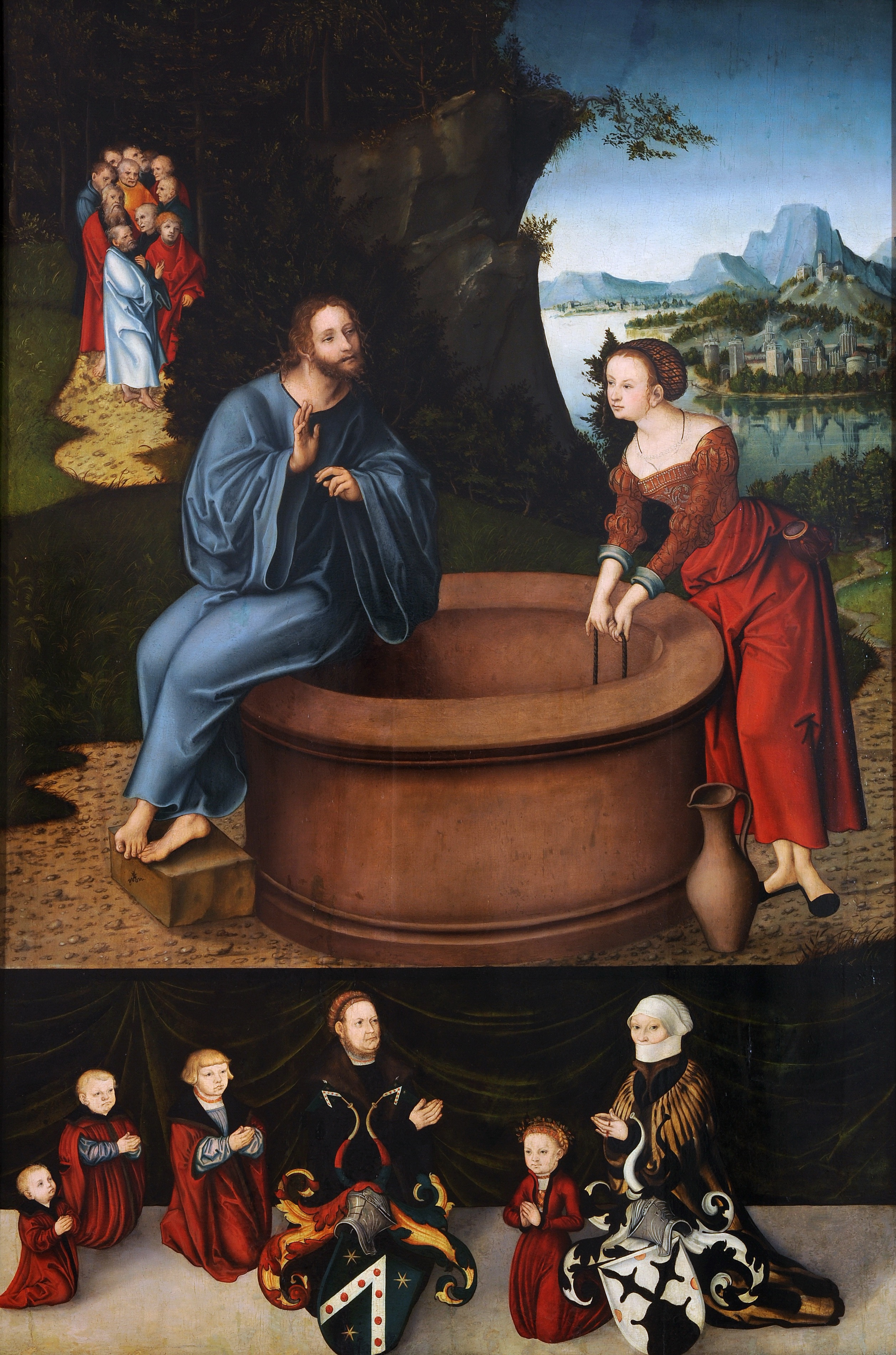
Christ and the Samaritan Woman, by Lucas Cranach the Elder

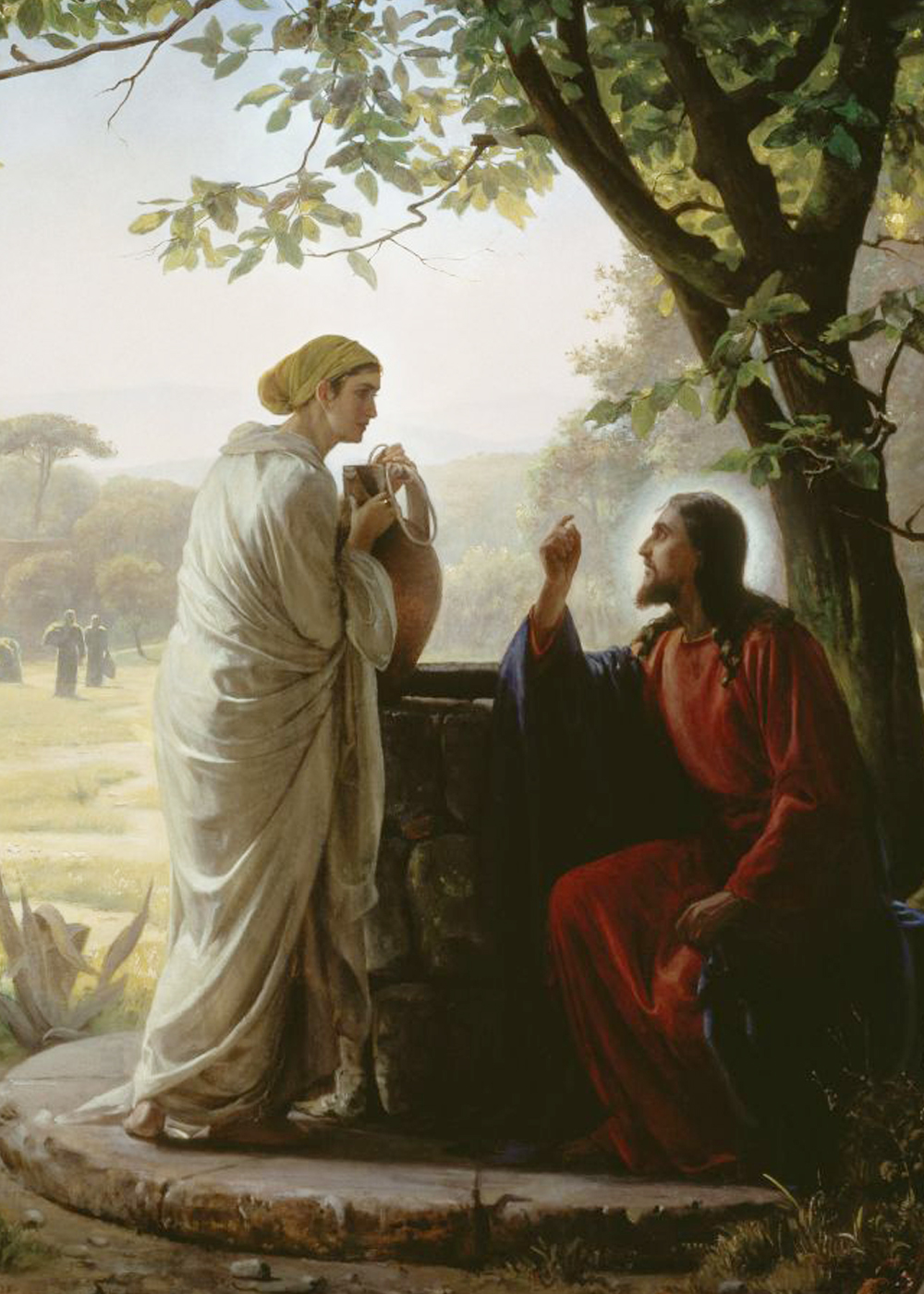
Woman at the Well by Carl Heinrich Bloch

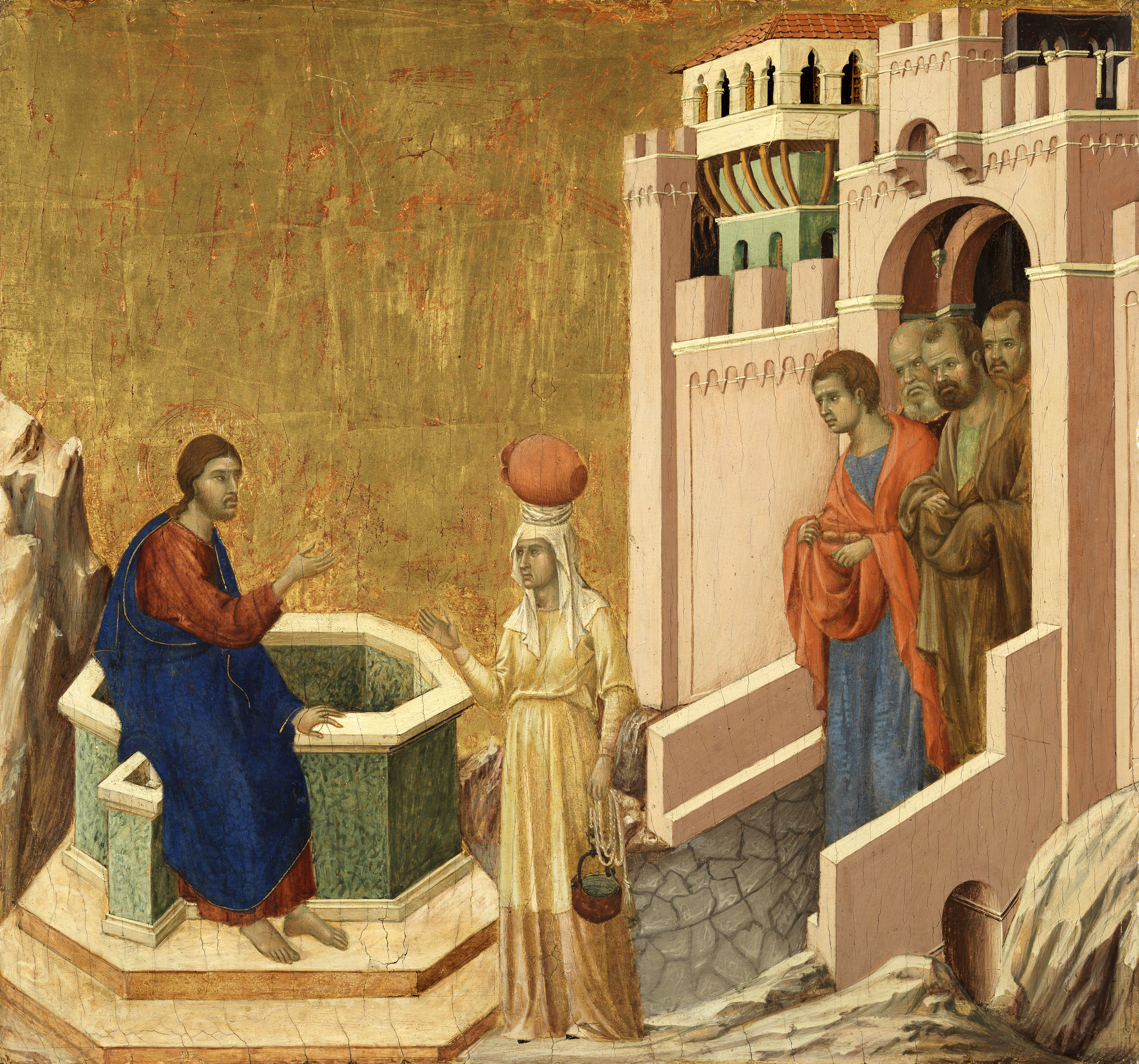
Christ and the Samaritan Woman by Duccio di Boninsegna

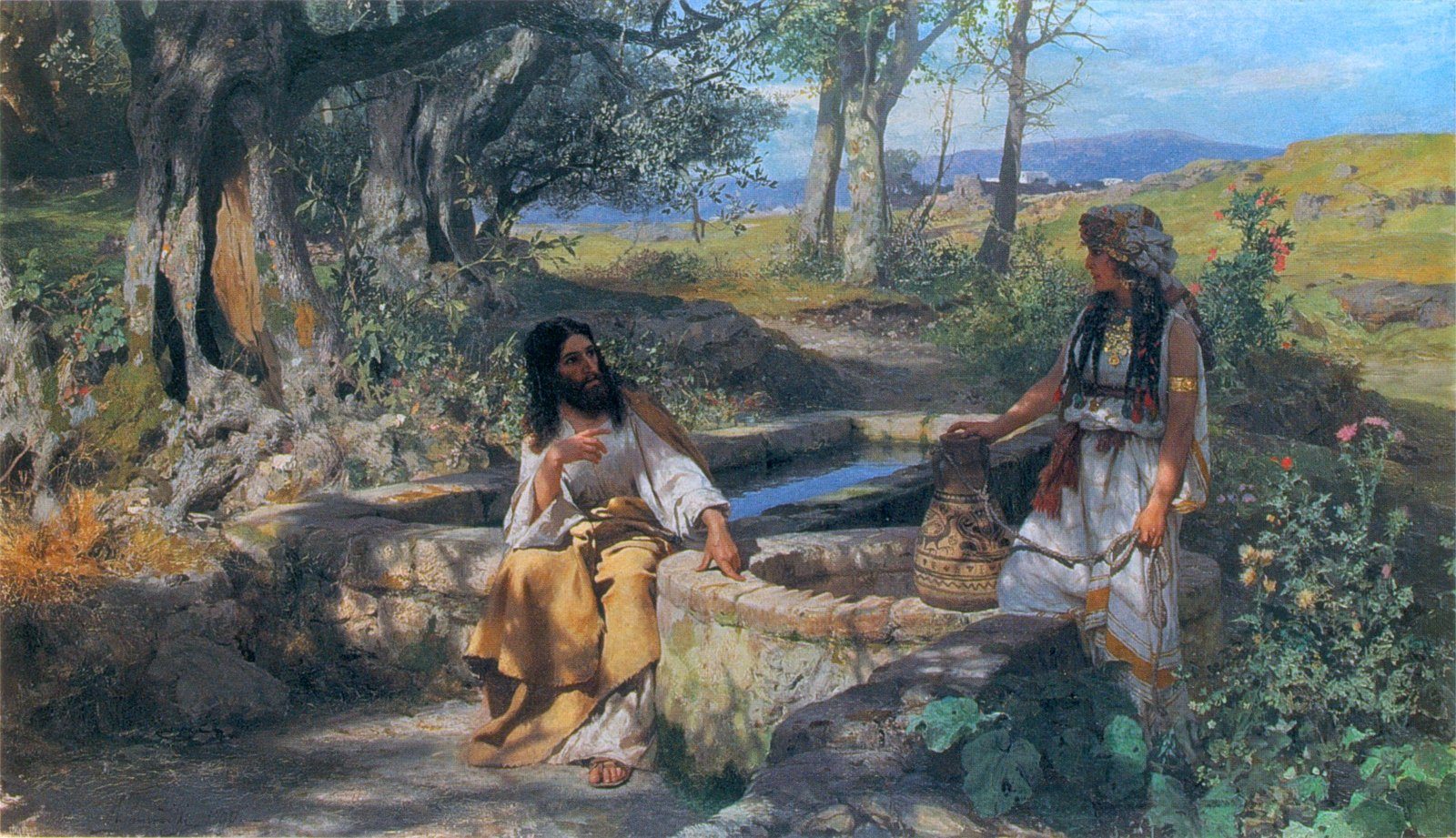
Christ and Samaritan by Henryk Siemiradzki

=== In music ===
- Jesus Met the Woman at the Well, a gospel song dating from 1949 or before (earliest known recording by The Fairfield Four)
- Lift Him Up That's All, a gospel song dating from 1927 or before (earliest known recording by Washington Phillips)
- The Woman of Samaria, a sacred cantata of 1867 by the English classical composer William Sterndale Bennett
- The Maid and the Palmer also known as The Well Below The Valley (Roud 2335, Child ballad 21)
- "Woman at the Well", by Olivia Lane
- "Jesus gave me Water", 1951 by Sam Cooke and The Soul Stirrers
- "Rivers Flow", 2007, by Marvin Sapp

“All I’ve Ever Done”, 2014, by Michael Card

=== In film and television ===
The Samaritan woman is played by Vanessa DeSilvio in the multi-season show on the life of Christ, The Chosen. Her meeting with Jesus concludes the first season. In the beginning of season 2, she is seen again, eagerly telling everyone around her about Jesus.

The Samaritan woman is played by Nancy Palk in the 2003 film The Gospel of John.

== See also ==
- Asian feminist theology
- Domnina (daughter of Nero)
- Jesus' interactions with women
- List of names for the biblical nameless
- Living Water
- Parable of the Good Samaritan
