= 1660 in art =

List of years in art	(table)
- … 1650; 1651; 1652; 1653; 1654; 1655; 1656; 1657; 1658; 1659; 1660; 1661; 1662; 1663; 1664; 1665; 1666; 1667; 1668; 1669; 1670 …
- Art; Archaeology; Architecture; Literature; Music; Philosophy; Science; +...

Events from the year 1660 in art.

== Events ==
- November – The Dutch Gift: a collection including 28 mostly Italian Renaissance paintings and a dozen classical sculptures is presented to the newly restored King Charles II of England by the States-General of the Netherlands.
- To circumvent restrictions placed by the Amsterdam painters' guild on bankrupts trading as painters, Rembrandt's son Titus van Rijn and mistress Hendrickje Stoffels set up a business as art dealers, nominally employing Rembrandt.

== Paintings ==
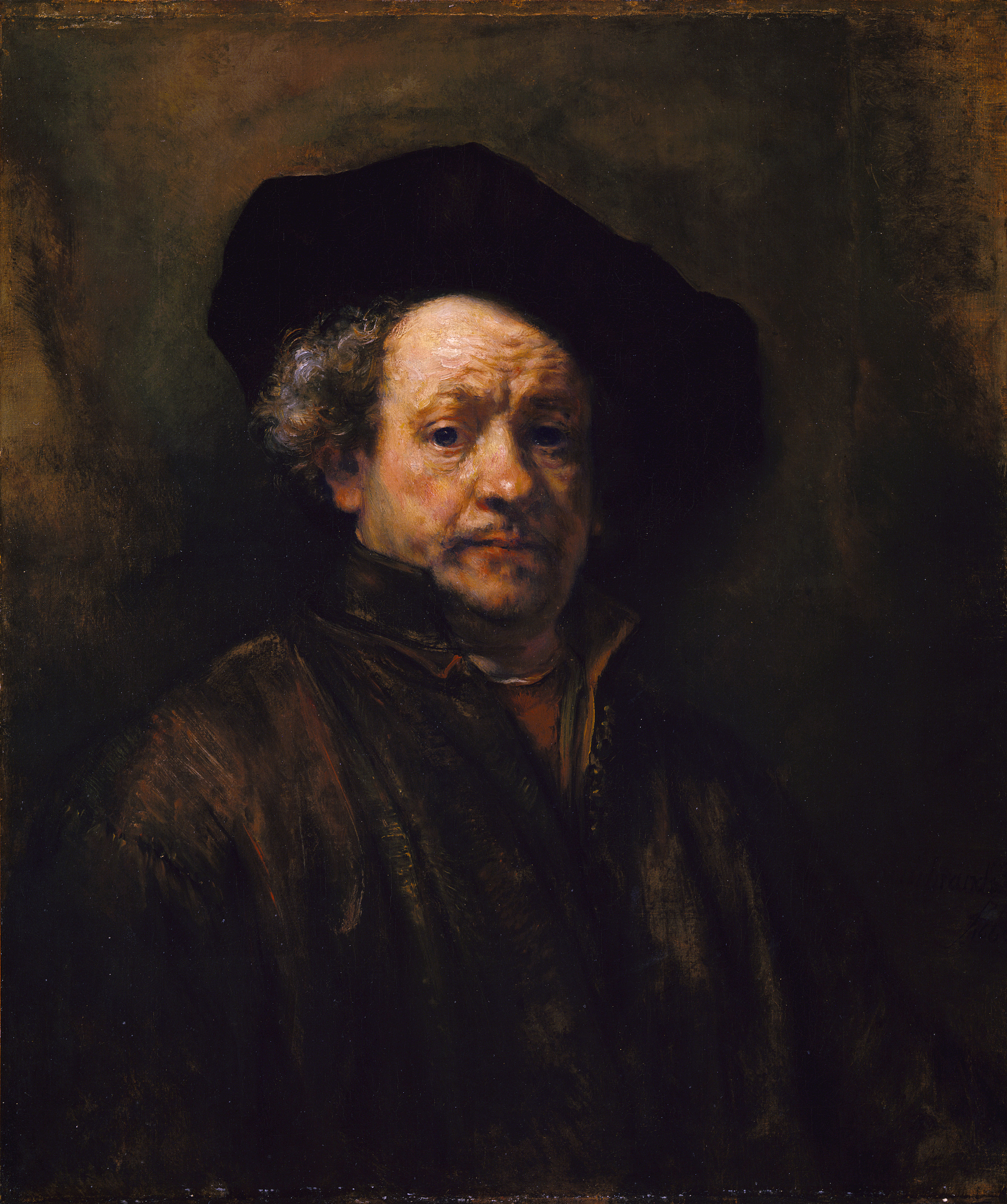
Rembrandt Self Portrait

- Aelbert Cuyp – approximate date
  - The Maas at Dordrecht
  - River Landscape with Horseman and Peasants
- Allaert van Everdingen – Nordic Landscape with a Castle on a Hill (approximate date)
- Rembrandt
  - Ahasuerus and Haman at the Feast of Esther
  - David and Saul
  - Self Portrait
  - Titus the Artist's Son
- Jan Steen – An interior with the artist eating oysters and Skittle Players outside an Inn
- Samuel Dirksz van Hoogstraten – A Peepshow with Views of the Interior of a Dutch House (approximate date)
- Velázquez – Infanta Margarita Teresa in a Pink Dress (completed (or perhaps painted) after the death of Velázquez by his pupil Juan Bautista Martínez del Mazo)
- Jan Vermeer
  - Girl Interrupted at Her Music
  - The Girl with the Wine Glass
  - The Glass of Wine
  - View of Delft

== Births ==
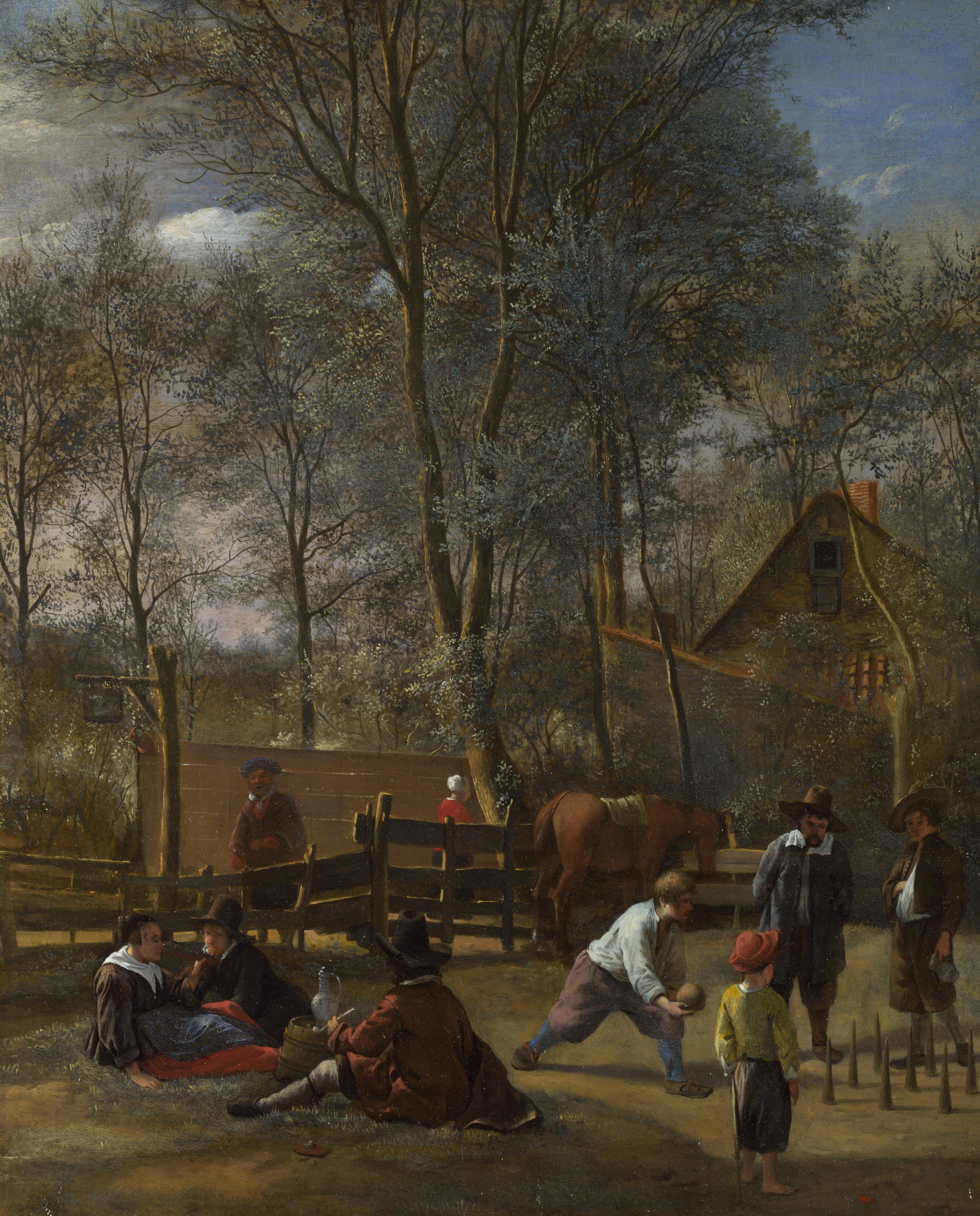
Skittle Players outside an Inn by Jan Steen.

- January 27 - Felice Cignani, Italian painter from Bologna (died 1724), son of Carlo Cignani
- March - Franz Joseph Feuchtmayer, German sculptor and stuccoist (died 1718)
- March 28 - Arnold Houbraken, Dutch painter and writer from Dordrecht (died 1719)
- April 24 - Cornelis Dusart, Dutch genre painter, draftsman, and printmaker (died 1704)
- By May - Anne Killigrew, English poet and painter (died 1685)
- June 17 - Jan van Mieris, Dutch painter (died 1690)
- date unknown
  - Antonio Amorosi, Italian painter, active in Ascoli Piceno and Rome (died 1738)
  - Francesco Bruni, Italian engraver (died unknown)
  - John Closterman, portrait painter (died 1711)
  - John Faber the Elder, Dutch portrait engraver active in London (died 1721)
  - Cesare Fantetti, Italian designer and etcher (died unknown)
  - Christopher Elias Heiss, German painter and printmaker (died 1731)
  - Pellegrino Antonio Orlandi, art historian (died 1727)
  - Gao Qipei, Chinese painter of landscapes and figures (died 1734)
  - Tobias Querfurt, German painter, draughtsman, and engraver (died 1734)
  - Giovanni Camillo Sagrestani, Florentine painter (died 1731)
  - Chen Shu, Chinese painter (died 1736)
  - Jerzy Siemiginowski-Eleuter, Polish painter and engraver (died 1711)
- probable
  - Andrés Pérez, Spanish Baroque painter (died 1727)
  - Johann Gustav Stockenberg, Swedish sculptor and stonemason (died 1710)
  - Peter Strudel, Austrian sculptor and painter (died 1714)
  - Jan Joost van Cossiau, Flemish landscape painter and engraver (died 1732)
  - Adriaen van Salm, Dutch draftsman and painter (died 1720)

== Deaths ==
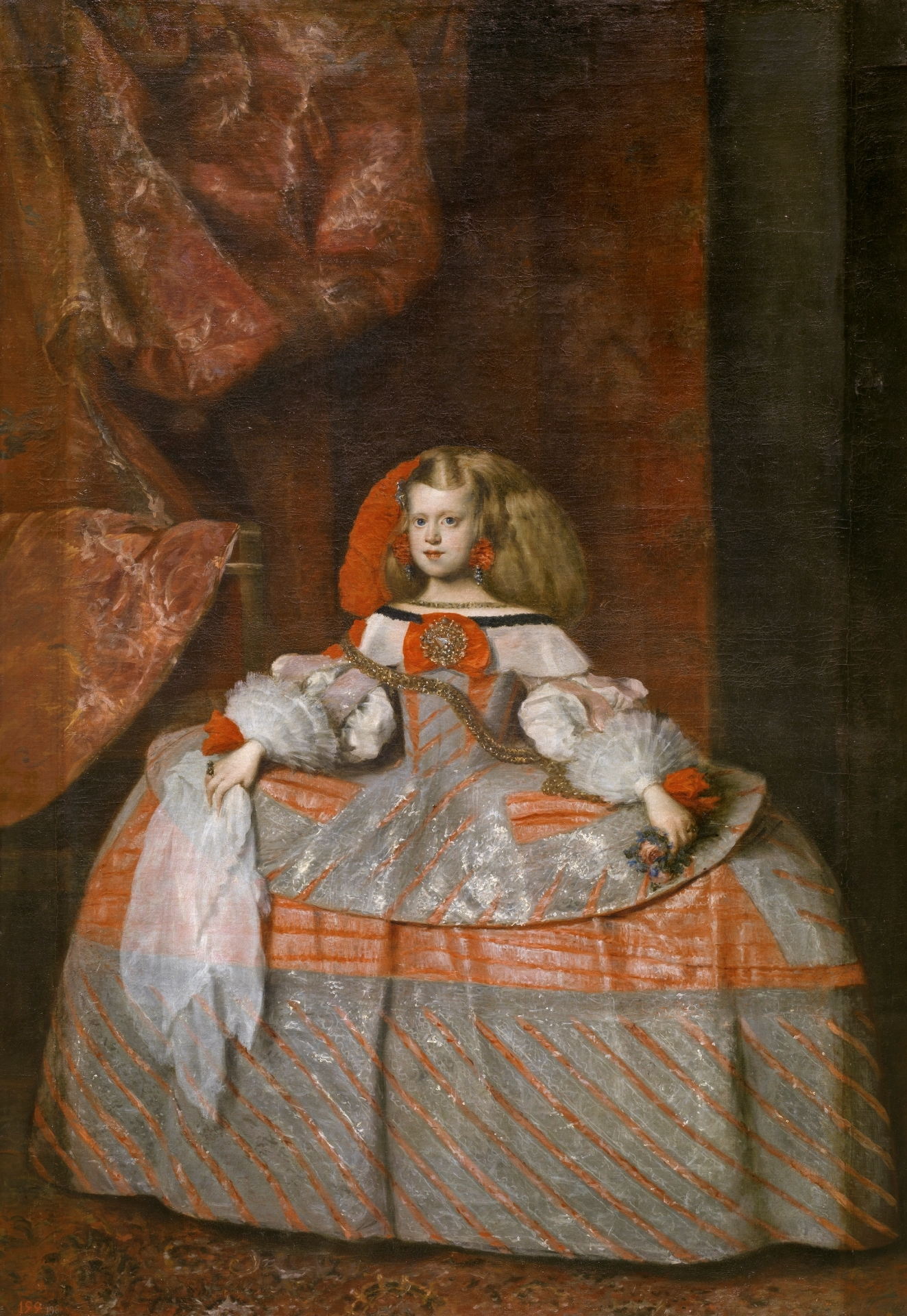
Infanta Margarita Teresa in a Pink Dress

- January 1 - Pieter Claesz, Dutch still life painter (born 1597)
- January 16 - Peter Wtewael, Dutch painter, son of Joachim Wtewael (born 1596)
- February 2 - Govert Flinck, Dutch painter of the Dutch Golden Age (born 1615)
- February 10 - Judith Leyster, Dutch painter of Haarlem (born 1609)
- March 5 - Felice Ficherelli, Italian painter active in Tuscany (born 1605)
- March 9 - Hieronymus Joachims, Austrian painter (born 1619)
- April 6 - Michelangelo Cerquozzi, Italian painter of small canvases of genre scenes (born 1602)
- July 2 - Francesco Maffei, Italian painter characterized by provincial stylistic quirks (born 1605)
- July 27 - Giovanni Battista Vanni, Italian painter of frescoes and engraver (born 1599)
- August 2 - Agostino Mitelli, Italian painter of quadratura (born 1609)
- August 6 - Diego Velázquez, Spanish painter (born 1599)
- September 22 - Pieter de Ring, Dutch painter famous for his opulent, flashy still lifes (born 1615)
- October 4 - Francesco Albani, Italian painter (born 1578)
- October 20 - Claude Deruet, French painter (born 1588)
- November 30 - Caterina Ginnasi, Italian painter of altarpieces for the church of Santa Lucia alle Botteghe Oscure (born 1590)
- date unknown
  - Esteban March, Spanish painter (born 1590)
  - Filippo d'Angeli, Italian painter of battle scenes with small figures (born 1600)
  - Giacomo Cavedone, Italian painter of the Bolognese School (born 1577)
  - Alexander Cooper, English Baroque miniature painter (born 1609)
  - Giovanni Battista Discepoli, Italian painter who was crippled (born 1590)
  - Bernardino Gagliardi, Italian painter of the Baroque period (born 1609)
  - Richard Tassel, French painter (born 1582)
- probable
  - Giuseppe Caletti, Italian painter and engraver (born 1600)
  - Antonio Rocca, Italian painter in Rome who became a monk (date of birth unknown)
  - Juan Valdelmira de Leon, Spanish of primarily still-life paintings of fruit and flowers (born 1630)
  - Jan Baptist Weenix, Dutch Golden Age painter (born 1621)
