= 1727 in art =

List of years in art	(table)
- … 1717; 1718; 1719; 1720; 1721; 1722; 1723; 1724; 1725; 1726; 1727; 1728; 1729; 1730; 1731; 1732; 1733; 1734; 1735; 1736; 1737 …
- Art; Archaeology; Architecture; Literature; Music; Philosophy; Science; +...

Events from the year 1727 in art.

== Events ==
- Pierre Subleyras, a Provençal painter, wins the Prix de Rome at the age of 28.

== Paintings ==
- Canaletto
  - The Stonemason's Yard (Campo S. Vidal and Santa Maria della Carità, Venice) (approximate date)
  - Venice: S. Geremia and the Entrance to the Cannaregio (British Royal Collection, Windsor Castle)
- Balthasar Denner – Portrait of George Frideric Handel
- Panagiotis Doxaras – Ceiling of Church of Saint Spyridon, Corfu
- Charles Jervas – Portrait of Queen Caroline of Ansbach
- Giovanni Battista Pittoni – Approximate date
  - Allegorical Tomb for Isaac Newton
  - Frescoes with scenes from the life of Diana, palazzetto Widman, Bagnoli di Sopra
- Sebastiano Ricci
  - Agar in the desert
  - Ecstasy of St. Teresa
  - Jacob blesses the sons of Joseph
  - Moses saved from the waters
  - Rebecca and Eliazer at the well
  - Saint Gaetano heals the Sick
- Sir James Thornhill – Painted Hall of Royal Hospital for Seamen, Greenwich (1707–27)

== Births ==
- April 20 – Josef Jáchym Redelmayer, Czech painter, fresco painter and theater decorator (died 1788)
- May 14 – Thomas Gainsborough, English artist (died 1788)
- May 18/19 – Felix Ivo Leicher, Czech-born Viennese painter of altarpieces and secular works (died 1812)
- August 30 – Giovanni Domenico Tiepolo, Italian painter and printmaker in etching (died 1804)
- December 14 – François-Hubert Drouais, French painter (died 1775)
- date unknown
  - Don Manuel Alvarez, Spanish sculptor (died 1797)
  - Ivan Argunov, Russian painter (died 1802)
  - Pietro Campana, Spanish engraver (died 1765)
  - Francesco Giuseppe Casanova, Italian painter and a younger brother of Giacomo Casanova (died 1803)
  - Mason Chamberlin, English portrait painter (died 1787)
  - Giovanni Battista Cipriani, Italian painter and engraver (died 1785)
  - William Elliott, English engraver (died 1766)
  - Jean-Claude Richard, French painter and engraver (died 1791)
  - Giulio Traballesi, Italian designer and engraver (died 1812)
- probable
  - Antonio Baratta, Italian designer and engraver (death unknown)
  - George Hepplewhite, English furniture designer (died 1786)
  - Andrea Toresani, Italian painter and draughtsman of landscapes and portraits (died 1760)

== Deaths ==
- January 5 - Giovanni Antonio Burrini, Bolognese painter of Late-Baroque or Rococo style (born 1656)
- February 6 – Charles Boit, Swedish painter in vitreous enamels (born 1662)
- April 29 – François Coudray, French sculptor (born 1678)
- May 18 – Norbert Roettiers, Flemish engraver (born 1665)
- August 27 – Aert de Gelder, Dutch artist in the tradition of Rembrandt (born 1645)
- September 8 – Giuseppe Bartolomeo Chiari, Italian painter of frescoes (born 1654)
- October – Michiel Carree, Dutch painter (born 1657)
- date unknown
  - Claude Duflos, French engraver (born 1665)
  - Alessio Erardi, Maltese painter (born 1669)
  - Pietro Erardi, Maltese chaplain and painter (born 1644)
  - Perpète Evrard, Flemish painter of portraits and miniatures (born 1662)
  - Pellegrino Antonio Orlandi, art historian (born 1660)
  - Andrés Pérez, Spanish Baroque painter (born 1660)
  - Pablo González Velázquez, Spanish Baroque painter (born 1664)
  - Matthijs Wulfraet, Dutch Golden Age painter (born 1648)
  - Jan van der Vaardt, Dutch painter of portraits, landscapes and trompe-l'œil (born 1650)
