= 1731 in art =

Events from the year 1731 in art.

== Events ==
- János Krucsay donates the Krucsay Altar to the Franciscan Church in Nyírbátor
- Charles-Joseph Natoire receives his first commission from Philibert Orry.

== Works ==
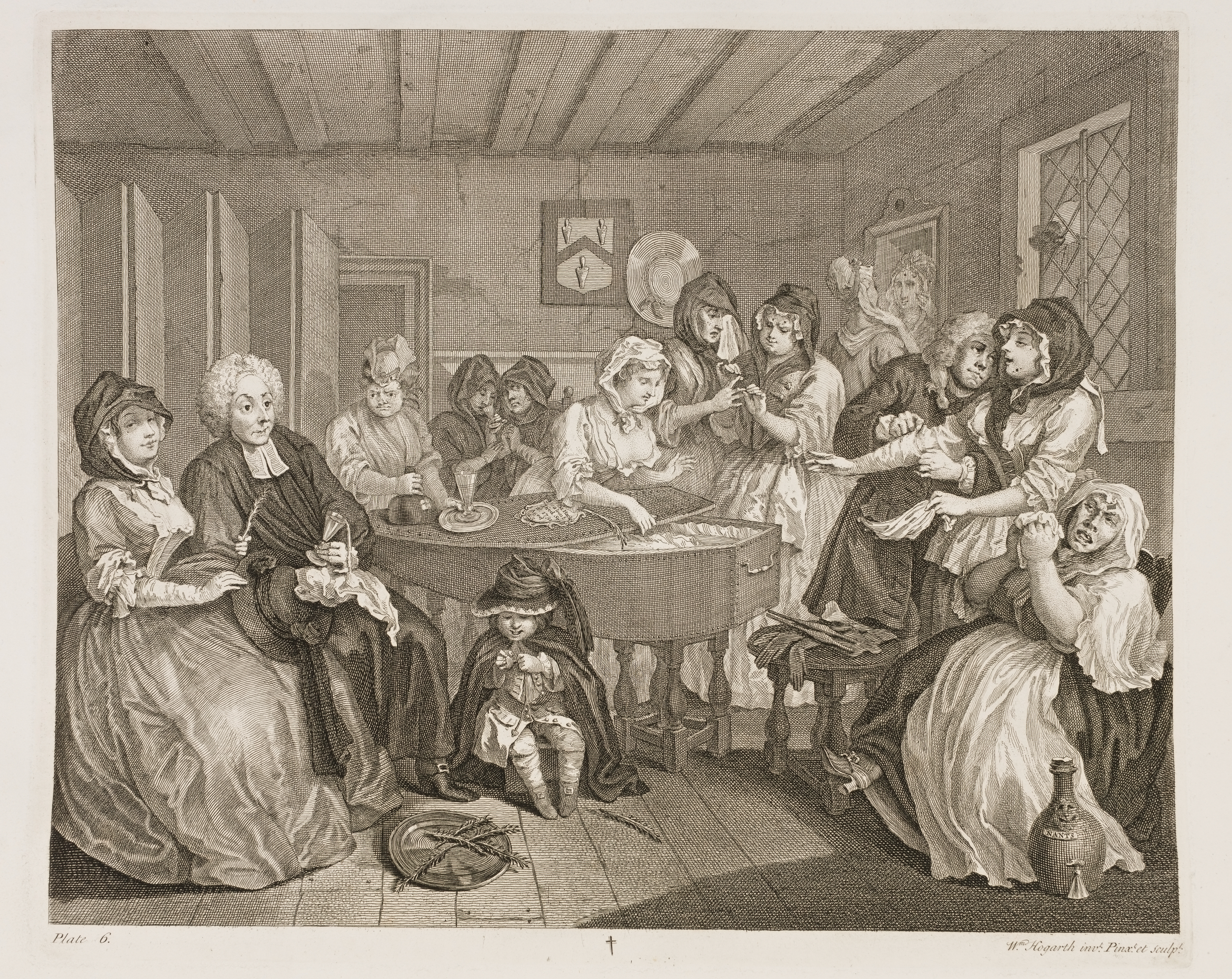
William Hogarth, Moll's Wake (Plate 6 of the Harlot's Progress engravings)

- Jean-Baptiste-Siméon Chardin – The White Tablecloth
- William Hogarth – A Harlot's Progress (paintings - lost in fire, 1755)
- Giovanni Paolo Panini – Interior of Saint Peter's
- Francesco Maria Schiaffino – Crucifix with Angels
- Andreas Silbermann – organ of the Saint-Maurice Church in Ebersmunster
- Willem Van der Hagen – State Ball in Dublin Castle
- Richard Waitt – The Cromartie Fool

== Births ==
- January 1 – Étienne-Pierre-Adrien Gois, French sculptor (died 1823)
- February 10 – Thomas Beckwith, English painter, genealogist and antiquary (died 1786)
- February 16 – Marcello Bacciarelli, Italian painter (died 1818)
- May 18 – José Camarón Bonanat, Spanish painter, mainly active in Valencia (died 1803)
- June 19 – Joaquim Machado de Castro, Portuguese sculptor (died 1822)
- June 20 – Pierre Julien, French sculptor (died 1804)
- July 1 – Johannes Wiedewelt, Danish neoclassical sculptor (died 1802)
- date unknown
  - Dirk van der Aa, Dutch painter (died 1809)
  - Pierre-Philippe Choffard, French draughtsman and engraver (died 1809)
  - Per Floding, Swedish designer and engraver (died 1791)
  - John Inigo Richards, English landscape painter (died 1810)
  - Paul Sandby, map-maker turned landscape painter in watercolours (died 1809)
  - Margareta Christina Giers, Swedish painter (died 1765)

== Deaths ==
- February 27 – Francis Bird, English sculptor (born 1667)
- March 6 – Johann Melchior Dinglinger, one of Europe's greatest goldsmiths, German artist in a Mannerist tradition into the "Age of Rococo" (born 1664)
- March 8 – Ferdinand Brokoff, Bohemian sculptor (born 1688)
- April 18 - Giovanna Fratellini, Italian painter of small miniature portraits (born 1666)
- June 6 – Giovanni Odazzi, Italian painter and etcher (born 1663)
- June 7 – William Aikman, Scottish-born portrait painter (born 1682)
- June 20 - Ned Ward, English writer and publican (born 1667)
- date unknown
  - Christopher Elias Heiss, German painter and printmaker (born 1660)
  - Yedikuleli Seyyid 'Abdullah Efendi, Ottoman calligrapher (born unknown)
  - Giovanni Camillo Sagrestani, Italian painter of the Baroque era in Florence (born 1660)
- probable – Bartolomeo Letterini, Italian painter from Venice (born 1669)
