= 1804 in art =

The year 1804 in art involved some significant artistic events and new works.

== Events ==
- 30 April – The Royal Academy Exhibition of 1804 opens at Somerset House in London
- Sculptor Pompeo Marchesi wins a scholarship to study in Rome under Antonio Canova.
- The Society of Painters in Water Colours, predecessor of the Royal Watercolour Society, is founded in London, UK, by William Frederick Wells.

== Works ==
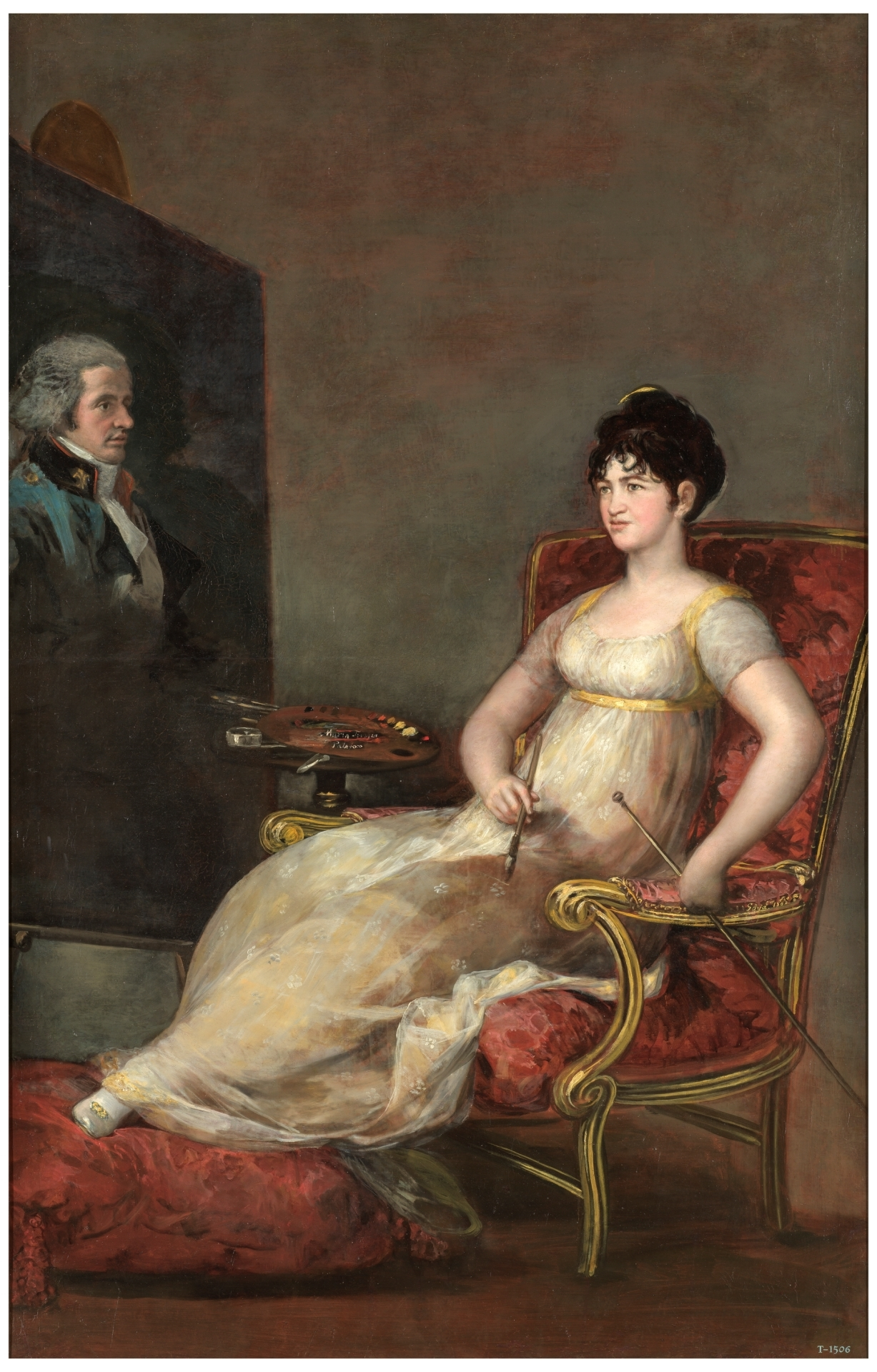
The Marquesa of Villafranca, painted by Goya

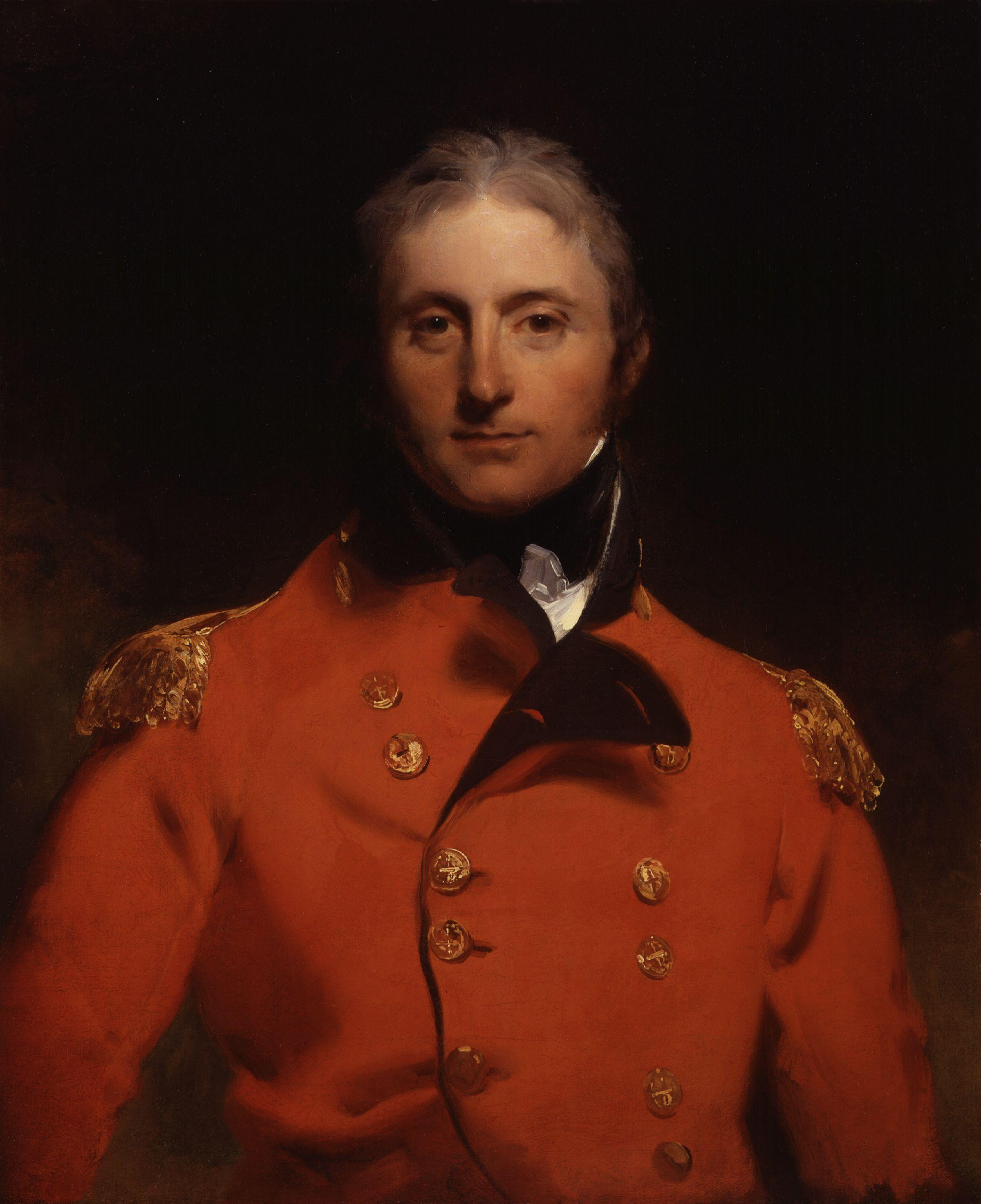
Portrait of Sir John Moore by Thomas Lawrence.

- Louis-Léopold Boilly – The Studio of Jean-Antoine Houdon
- John Constable – The Bridges Family
- Johann Friedrich Dryander – French troops before Saint-Jean-lès-Sarrebruck
- Anne-Louis Girodet de Roussy-Trioson – Dominique Jean Larrey
- Francisco Goya – Portrait of María Tomasa Palafox, Marquesa of Villafranca
- Antoine-Jean Gros – Bonaparte Visiting the Plague Victims of Jaffa
- Thomas Douglas Guest – Madonna and Child
- John Hoppner – Portrait of William Pitt
- Jean Auguste Dominique Ingres – Bonaparte, First Consul
- Orest Kiprensky – Portrait of Adam Shvabler
- Thomas Lawrence
  - Portrait of Caroline of Brunswick
  - Portrait of Sir John Moore
  - Portrait of Sarah Siddons
- Louis-François Lejeune
  - The Battle of Aboukir
  - The Battle of Lodi
- Robert Lefèvre – Portrait of Carle Vernet
- Philip James de Loutherbourg – Banditti in a Landscape
- John Opie – Master Betty as Young Norval
- Stepan Shchukin – Portrait of Andreyan Zakharov (approximate date)
- Gilbert Stuart – Portrait of Dolley Madison
- George Stubbs – Ambrosio, a bay stallion, the property of Thomas Haworth
- J.M.W. Turner – Boats Carrying Out Anchors and Cables to the Dutch Men of War
- John Vanderlyn – The Death of Jane McCrea
- Benjamin West
  - Cicero Discovering the Tomb of Archimedes
  - Thetis Bringing the Armor to Achilles (first version)
- David Wilkie
  - Pitlessie Fair
  - William Chalmers-Bethune, his wife Isabella Morison and their Daughter Isabella

== Awards ==
The Prix de Rome had been expanded in 1803 to include musical composition as a category, but was not awarded in 1804.

- Grand Prix de Rome, painting:
- Grand Prix de Rome, sculpture:
- Grand Prix de Rome, architecture:
- Grand Prix de Rome, music: (none awarded).

== Births ==
- January 21 – Moritz von Schwind, Austrian painter (died 1871)
- February 21 – Charles-Joseph Traviès de Villers, French painter and caricaturist (died 1859)
- March 2 – Auguste Raffet, French illustrator and lithographer (died 1860)
- March 8 – Alvan Clark, American astronomer, telescope maker, portrait painter and engraver (died 1887)
- March 15 – Georgiana McCrae, English-born Australian painter (died 1890)
- April 4 – Andrew Nicholl, Irish painter (died 1886)
- April 16 – James Fahey, English landscape painter (died 1885)
- August 30 – Jacques Raymond Brascassat, French animal painter (died 1867)
- September 1 – John Scarlett Davis, English painter (died 1845)
- September 18 – John Steell, Scottish portrait sculptor (died 1891)
- September 27 – Anna McNeill Whistler, "Whistler's Mother" (died 1881)
- December 16 – Adèle Kindt, Belgian portrait and genre painter (died 1893)
- December 19 – Fitz Henry Lane, American luminist painter (died 1865)
- date unknown
  - Chō Kōran, Japanese poet and nanga artist (died 1879)
  - John Caspar Wild, Swiss-born American painter and lithographer (died 1846)

== Deaths ==
- January 28 – Nils Schillmark, Swedish-born painter who lived and worked in Finland (born 1745)
- February 27 - Auguste-Louis de Rossel de Cercy, French painter primarily of naval scenes (born 1736)
- March 3 – Giovanni Domenico Tiepolo, Italian painter and printmaker in etching (born 1727)
- March 5 – Francis Sartorius, English painter of horses (born 1734)
- March 18 – Louis Jean Desprez, French painter and architect (born 1743)
- June 2 – Cornelius Høyer, Danish miniature painter (born 1741)
- October – Charles Grignion the Younger, British history and portrait painter and engraver (born 1754)
- October 29 – George Morland, English painter of animals and rustic scenes (born 1763)
- November 4 – Nicola Peccheneda, Italian painter (born 1725)
- November 5 – August Friedrich Oelenhainz, German painter (born 1745)
- November 18 – Charles-Étienne Gaucher, French engraver (born 1740)
- December 12 – John Boydell, English engraver (born 1720)
- December 17 – Pierre Julien, French sculptor (born 1731)
- December 24 – Moses Haughton the elder, English designer, engraver and painter of portraits and still life (born 1734)
- date unknown
  - Peter Haas, German-Danish engraver (born 1754)
  - Liu Yong, Chinese politician and calligrapher in the Qing Dynasty (born 1719)
