= 1734 in art =

Events from the year 1734 in art.

== Events ==
- December 24 – A fire destroys the Royal Alcázar of Madrid, the residence of the Spanish royal family, along with more than 400 valuable paintings and 100 sculptures.
- Painter Charles-Joseph Natoire receives his first royal commission, for the Chambre de la Reine at the Palace of Versailles.

== Works ==
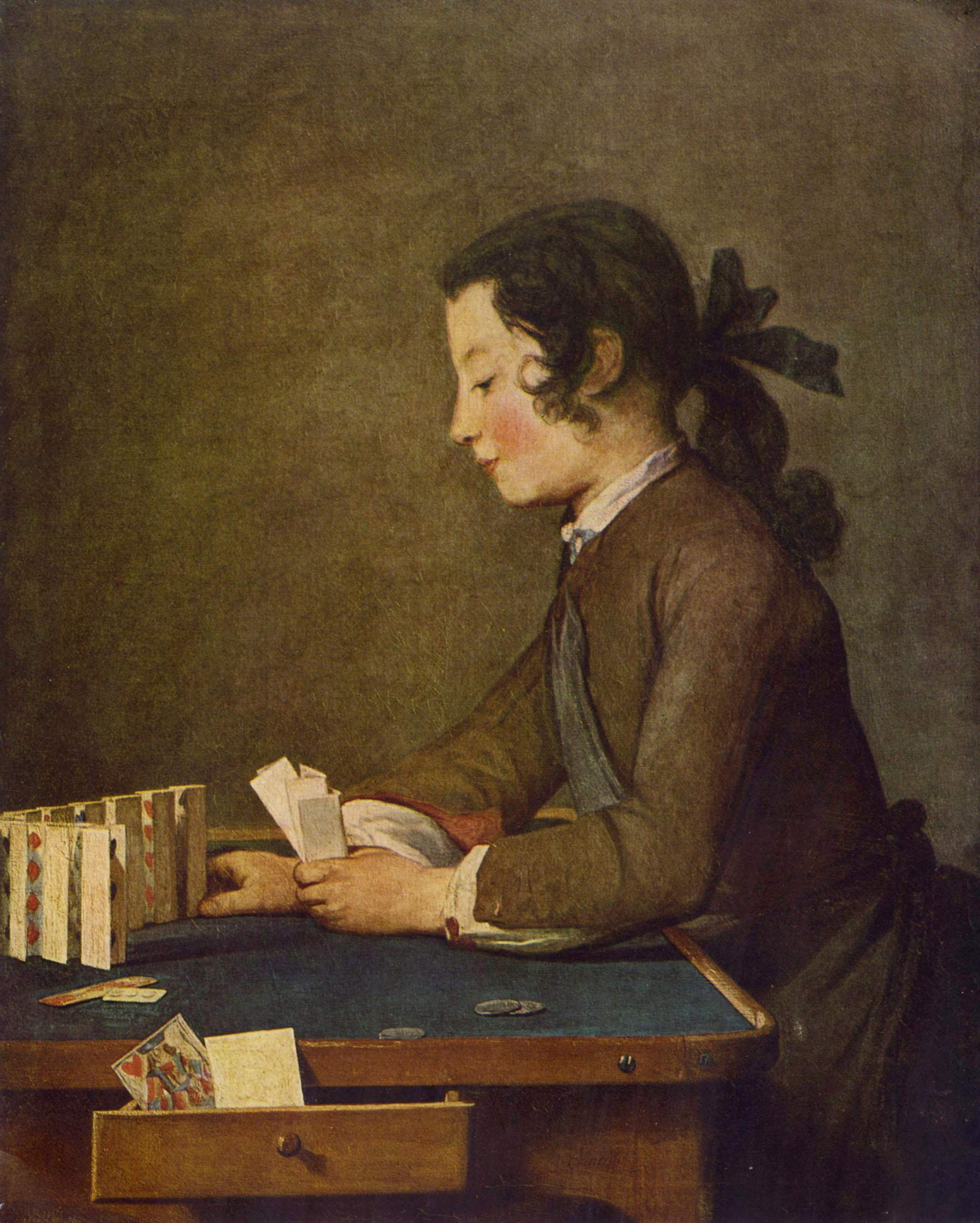
Chardin, The House of Cards

- Jean-Baptiste-Siméon Chardin
  - The Game of Knucklebones (approximate date)
  - The House of Cards
- Charles-Joseph Natoire – Venus Demanding Arms from Vulcan for Aeneas
- Bartolomeo Nazari - Portrait of Farinelli
- Peter Scheemakers – Gilded equestrian statue of King William III (Kingston upon Hull, England)

== Births ==
- January 10 – Giovanni Pichler, German-Italian artist in engraved gems (died 1791)
- March 9
  - Marie-Suzanne Giroust, French painter (died 1772)
  - Francisco Bayeu y Subías, Spanish painter in the Neoclassical style, primarily of religious and historical themes (died 1795)
- April 1 – Cristoforo Dall'Acqua, Italian painter and engraver (died 1787)
- May 7 – Jean Humbert, Dutch portrait painter (died 1794)
- May 20 – Anton Janša, Slovene apiarist and painter (died 1773)
- July 4 – Jean Henri Riesener, furniture designer (died 1806)
- August 31 – Gaetano Gandolfi, Bolognese painter (died 1802)
- September 3 – Joseph Wright of Derby, British painter (died 1797)
- September 17 – Jean-Baptiste Le Prince, French etcher and painter (died 1781)
- December 15 – George Romney, English painter (died 1802)
- date unknown
  - Peter Perez Burdett, English draughtsman (died 1793)
  - Samuel Cotes, British painter of miniature portraits and also worked in crayons (died 1818)
  - Francesco Antonio Franzoni, Italian sculptor (died 1818)
  - Moses Haughton the elder, English designer, engraver and painter of portraits and still life (died 1804)
  - Francis Sartorius, painter of horses (died 1804)

== Deaths ==
- February 10 – Jean Raoux, French painter (born 1677)
- March 7 – John Verelst, English portrait painter (born c. 1670)
- May 4 – James Thornhill, English painter (born 1675 or 1676)
- May 15 – Sebastiano Ricci, Italian painter in the Cortonesque style of grand manner fresco painting (born 1659)
- May 27 – Claude Audran III, French painter (born 1658)
- September 13 – Tobias Querfurt, German painter, draughtsman, and engraver (born 1660)
- October 5 - Paolo Alboni, Italian painter (born 1671)
- November - Peter Angelis, French painter (born 1685)
- November 21 – Alexis Simon Belle, French portrait painter (born 1674)
- December 5 – Peter Tillemans, Flemish baroque painter, especially of portraiture, landscapes, and works on sporting and military subjects (born c.1684)
- date unknown
  - Giacomo Bolognini, Italian painter of the Baroque (born 1664)
  - Pietro Capelli, Italian painter of the Rococo, active in quadratura (born unknown)
  - Louis de Chastillon, French painter in enamel and miniature, and engraver (born 1639)
  - Andrea Procaccini, Italian painter for the royal family of Philip V (born 1671)
  - Gao Qipei, Chinese painter of landscapes and figures (born 1660)
  - Gaetano Sabatini, Italian draftsman and painter (born 1703)
  - Cornelis Verelst, Dutch flower painter (born 1667)
