= 1732 in art =

Events from the year 1732 in art.

== Events ==
- Nicola Salvi begins work on the new Trevi Fountain

== Works ==
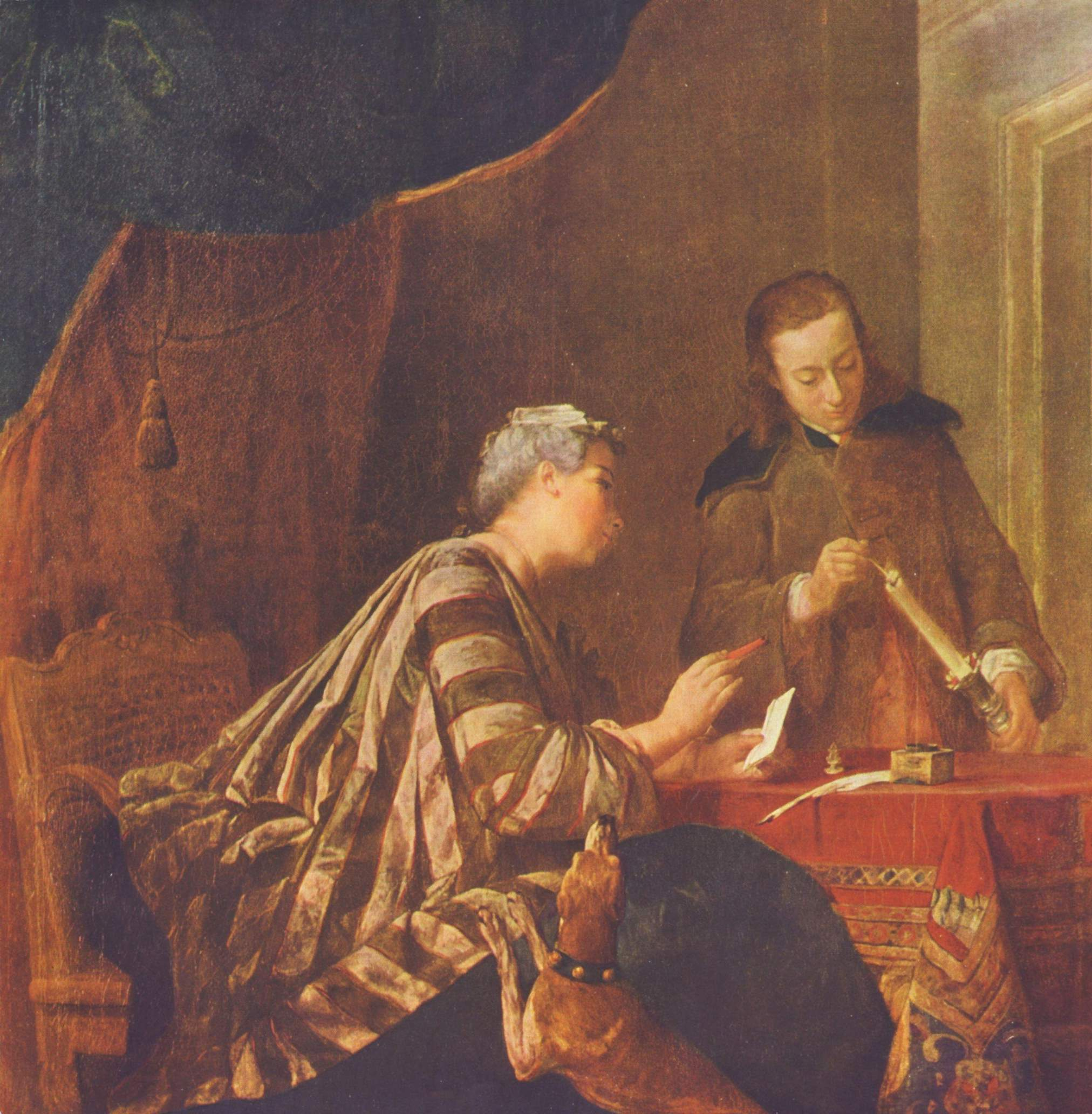
Jean-Baptiste-Siméon Chardin, Lady Sealing a Letter, 1732

- Canaletto
  - View of the Entrance to the Venetian Arsenal
  - Return of the Bucentoro to the Molo on Ascension Day
- Jean-Baptiste-Siméon Chardin – Lady Sealing a Letter
- Filippo della Valle – Cupid and Psyche (marble; approximate date)
- William Hogarth – A Midnight Modern Conversation; A Harlot's Progress (engravings by the artist)

== Births ==
- January 25 – François Devosge, French portrait painter (died 1811)
- February 22 – Jean-Bernard Restout, French painter (died 1797)
- April 5 – Jean-Honoré Fragonard, French painter and printmaker (died 1806)
- May 27 – Christopher Unterberger, Italian painter of the early-Neoclassical period (died 1798)
- November 18 – Pehr Hilleström, Swedish painter and teacher (died 1816)
- date unknown
  - Christian Gottlob Fechhelm, German portrait and historical painter (died 1816)
  - Johanne Seizberg, German-Danish illustrator and teacher (died 1772)
- probable
  - John Julius Angerstein, Russian-born British art collector (died 1823)
  - Carl-Ludwig Christinek, Russian painter (died 1794)

== Deaths ==
- February 18 – Balthasar Permoser, Austrian sculptor (born 1651)
- February 28 – André Charles Boulle, cabinet maker (born 1642)
- August 23 – Felice Boselli, Italian painter (born 1650)
- September 22 – Herman Moll, engraver (born c. 1654)
- October 25 – Andrea Brustolon, Italian sculptor in wood (born 1662)
- date unknown
  - Francesco Bassi, Italian painter (born 1642)
  - Jacques-Philippe Ferrand, French miniaturist and painter in enamel (born 1653)
  - Antonio Gionima, Italian painter (born 1697)
  - Abdulcelil Levni, Turkish/Italian poet and painter, in the service of the court at Istanbul (born 1680)
  - Gasparo Lopez, Italian painter of flowers (born 1677)
  - Michele Pagano, Italian painter of landscapes or vedutista (born 1697)
  - Matthijs Pool, Dutch engraver (born 1676)
  - Giovanni Battista Revello, Italian painter of landscape elements for other historical painters (born 1672)
  - Jiang Tingxi, Chinese painter (born 1669)
  - Giuseppe Tonelli, Italian painter of frescoes and quadratura (born 1668)
  - Jan Joost van Cossiau, Flemish landscape painter and engraver (born 1660)
  - Richard Waitt, Scottish portrait painter
