= 1669 in art =

Events from the year 1669 in art.

== Events ==
- Following the fall of Crete to the Ottomans, the Heptanese School, also known as the Ionian Islands' School, succeeds the Cretan school as the leading school of Greek post-Byzantine painting.

== Paintings ==
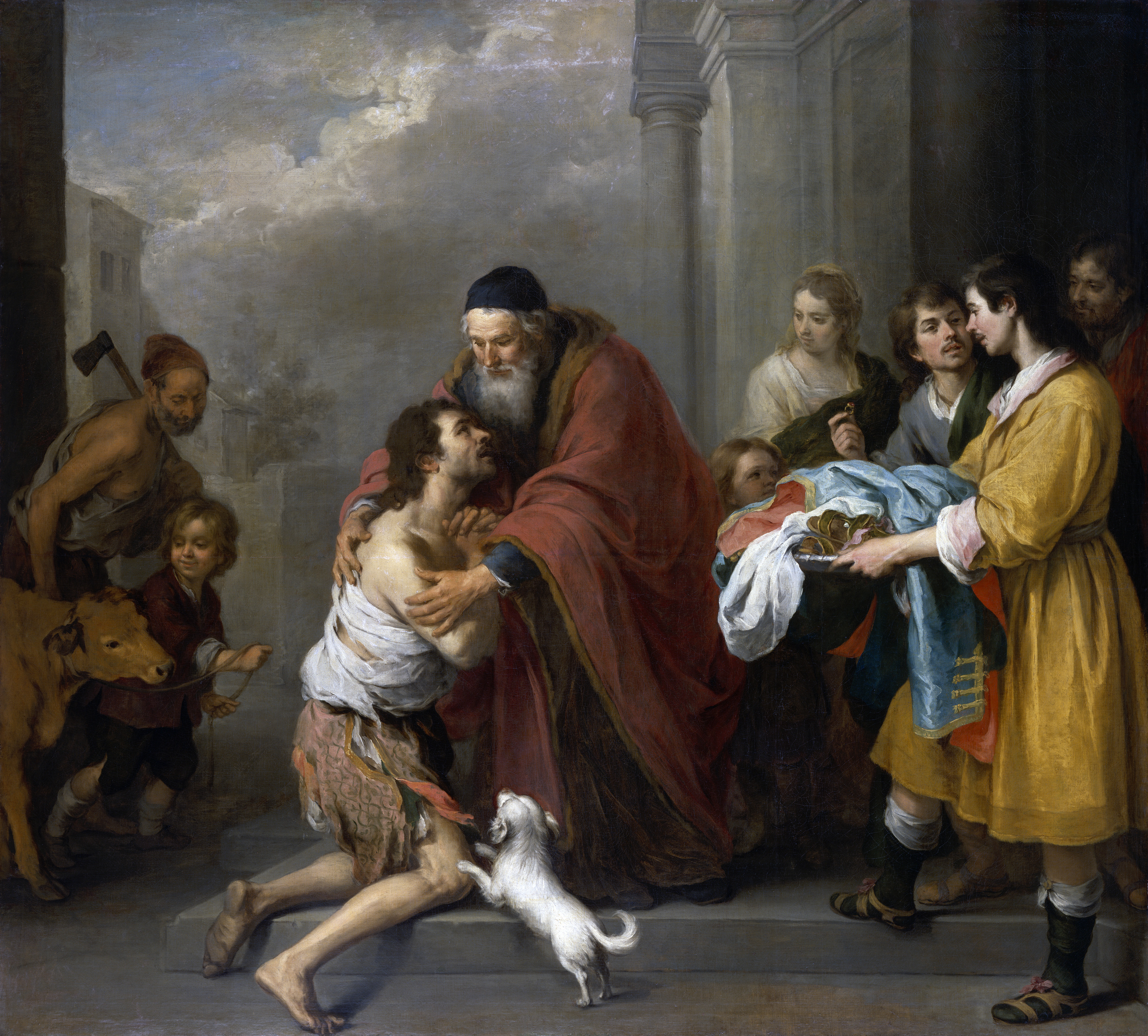
Murillo – Return of the Prodigal Son, National Gallery of Art

- Hendrick Danckerts – A View of Tangier
- Bartolomé Esteban Murillo - Return of the Prodigal Son
- Pierre Prieur – Portrait miniatures of King Charles II of England and Lady Castlemaine
- Jan Vermeer – The Geographer

== Births ==
- September 21 - Pietro Ercole Fava, Italian nobleman and art patron (died 1744)
- December 16 - Arnold Boonen, Dutch portrait painter (died 1729)
- date unknown
  - Jiang Tingxi, Chinese painter (died 1732)
  - Giovanni Antonio Capello, Italian painter, active in Brescia (died 1741)
  - Alessio Erardi, Maltese painter (died 1727)
  - Antonio Filocamo, Italian painter at various churches and oratories in Messina (died 1743)
  - Bartolomeo Letterini, Venetian painter (died 1731)
  - Angelo Trevisani, Italian painter active mainly in Venice (died 1753)
  - Pierre Le Ber, painter from Montreal, especially of portraits (died 1707)
  - Ma Yuanyu, Chinese painter during the Qing Dynasty (died 1722)

== Deaths ==
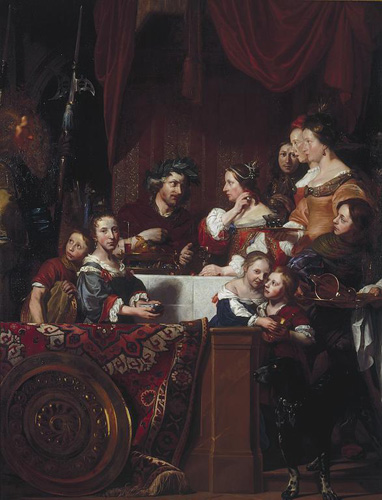
Jan de Bray (left) and his family pose as The Banquet of Antony and Cleopatra. By the date of this second version of 1669, most of the models had died of the plague some years before.

- January 27 – Caspar de Crayer, Flemish painter (born 1582)
- May
  - Joris van der Haagen, Dutch painter (born 1615)
  - Pieter Post, Dutch architect, painter and printmaker (born 1608)
- May 16 – Pietro da Cortona, byname of Pietro Berettini, prolific artist and architect of High Baroque (born 1596)
- July 12 – Theodoor van Thulden, Dutch artist from 's-Hertogenbosch in North Brabant (born 1606)
- July 17 - Herman van Aldewereld, Dutch portrait painter (born 1628)
- August 10 – Paulus Bor, Dutch painter (born 1601)
- October 4 – Rembrandt, Dutch painter and etcher (born 1606)
- October 18 – Abraham Willaerts, Dutch Baroque painter (born 1603)
- October 19 – Domenico Fiasella, Italian painter of primarily frescoes (born 1589)
- December 24 - Antonio Giorgetti, Italian sculptor (born 1635)
- date unknown
  - François Anguier, French sculptor (born 1604)
  - Pier Martire Armani, Italian painter (born 1613)
  - Ludolph Büsinck, German wood-engraver (born in 1590s)
  - Giovanni Andrea de Ferrari, Italian painter of the Baroque period active in Genoa (born 1598)
  - Albert Flamen, Dutch engraver (born 1620)
  - 1669/1677: Bartholomeus Assteyn, Dutch painter (born 1607)
