= August Querfurt =

Austrian painter (1696–1761)

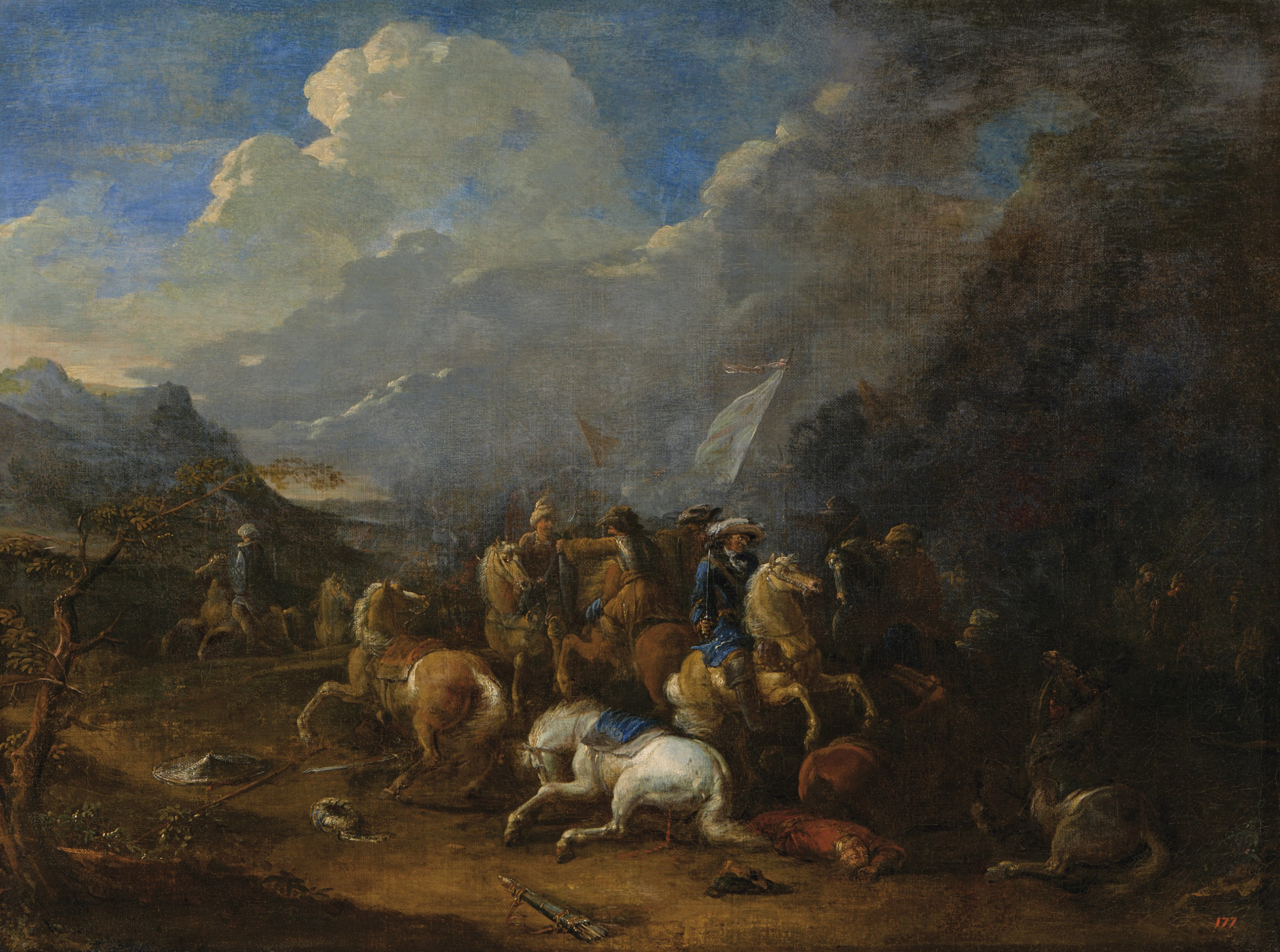
Battle of the imperial cavalry with the Turks, Palace on the Water in Warsaw.

August Querfurt (1696, Wolfenbüttel – 1761, Vienna) was an Austrian painter.

He painted primarily soldiers and battle scenes. He was first instructed by his father, Tobias Querfurt, a landscape and animal painter, and afterwards studied under Rugendas at Augsburg. He painted encampments, battles, skirmishes of cavalry, and hunting subjects, in all of which he appears rather as an imitator than as an original painter. He sometimes imitated the manner of Bourguignon, Parrocel, and Van der Meulen, but more especially sought to form his style after Wouwerman. He died at Vienna in 1761.

The Belvedere Museum possesses two hunting-pieces by him; the Augsburg Gallery, four, and a battle; others are in Berlin, Dresden, Stuttgart and Bratislava.
