= Adriaen van Salm =

Dutch draftsman and painter

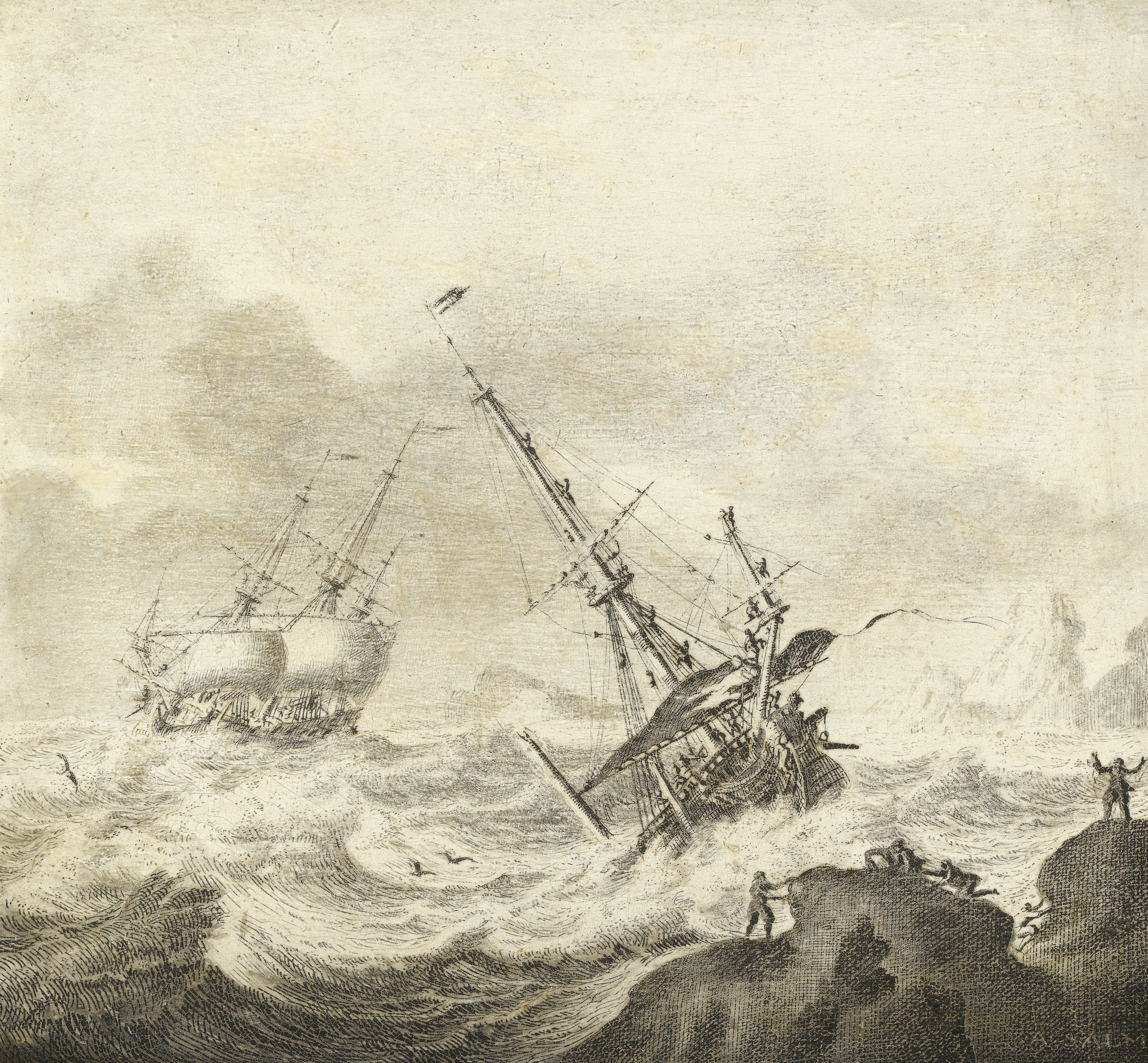
Shipping on a Stormy Sea by Adriaen van Salm, pencil and grisaille on oak panel

Adam, Abraham, or Adriaen van Salm, also van (der) Salm (c.1660–1720), was a Dutch draftsman and painter. He produced primarily marine art. These were done in pen with India ink applied to a cloth or a pre-processed panel.

Adriaen van Salm was born in Delfshaven. He was the father of Roelof van Salm and in 1706 he was listed as a draughtsman member of the Guild of Saint Luke in Delft. The Dordrechts Museum mentions further that he was also a schoolmaster and later a draper. Salm was the father and teacher of the artist Roelof van Salm, who wielded the same technique as well as his father and especially scenes of ships and naval battles. When Abraham Jacob van der Aa was writing, he saw a painting by this artist in the collection of the marine painter Johannes Christiaan Schotel.
