= Cesare Fantetti =

Italian engraver (1660–1740)

Cesare Fantetti (1660–1740) was an Italian engraver.

Fantetti was born at Florence, Grand Duchy of Tuscany about the year 1660. He was apprenticed in Rome. He most likely worked out of one of the many shops that sprang up with the growth of the print market.

== Works ==
Fantetti engraved several plates, after his own designs and those of other masters. Conjointly with Pietro Aquila, he engraved the plates from the paintings by Raphael in the Vatican, called Raphael's Bible, 37 of the series being executed by Fantetti, and the remainder by Aquila and some by Carlo Maratta. He also engraved the following prints:

- Agrippina with the Ashes of her Husband; after Franc. Rosa.
- Christ praying in the Garden; after L. Carracci.
- A Charity, with three Children; after Annibale Carraci.
- Latona insulted by Niobe; after the same.
- Flora surrounded by Cupids; after Ciro Ferri.
- The Death of St. Anne; after Andrea Sacchi.
- Some Friezes, and other subjects, from various Italian masters.
