= Pietro Ercole Fava =

Italian painter

Count Pietro Ercole Fava (21 September 1669 – 7 June 1744) was a Bolognese nobleman, who distinguished himself not only as a patron of art, but also as an amateur.

Fava was born at Bologna, Papal States in 1669. He studied art under L. Pasinelli, and was the protector and friend of Donato Creti and Ercole Graziani. He chiefly studied the works of the Carracci, whose style he preferred to every other. In the church of San Tommaso dal Mercato at Bologna is an altar-piece by him of the Virgin and Infant, with St. Albert, St. Paul, and other Saints; and at Ancona, in the cathedral, are the Adoration of the Magi, and the Resurrection. He was a member of the Clementine Academy.
