= The Bridges Family =

Painting by John Constable

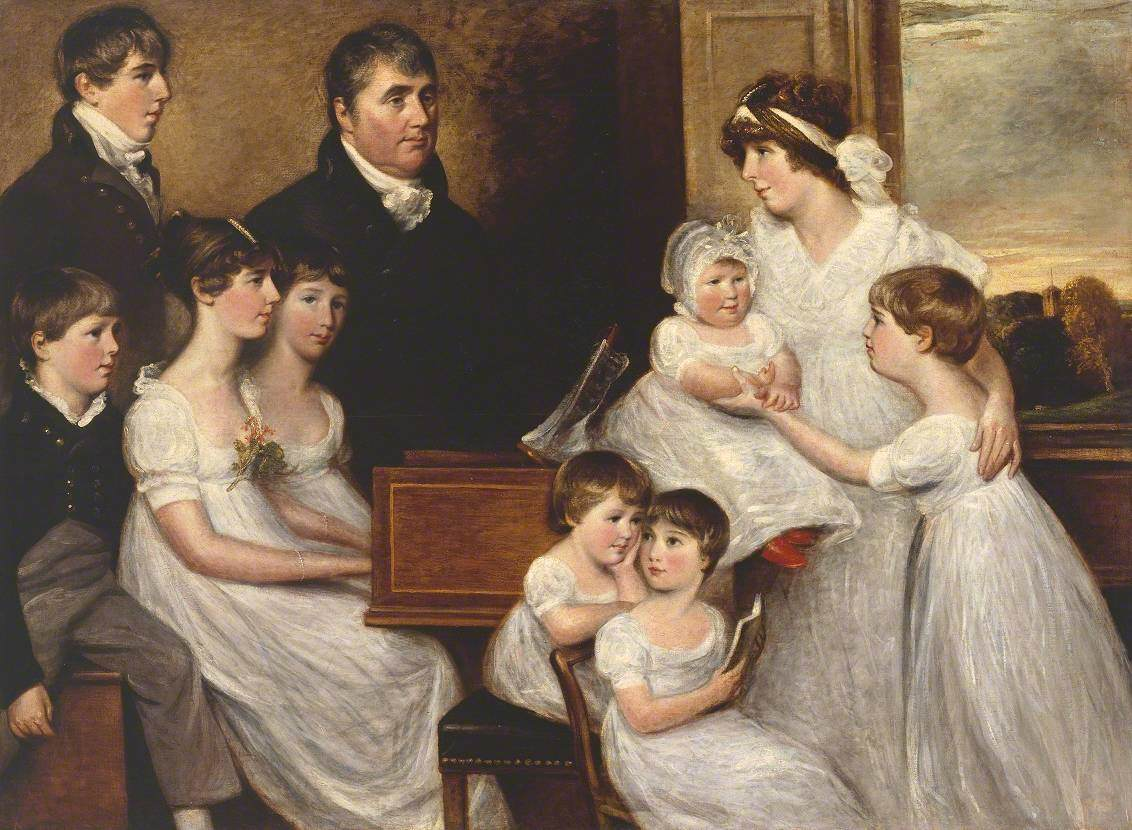
- Artist: John Constable
- Year: 1804
- Type: Oil on canvas, portrait painting
- Dimensions: 183.8 cm × 135.9 cm (72.4 in × 53.5 in)
- Location: Tate Britain, London

The Bridges Family is an 1804 portrait painting by the British artist John Constable. Now best known for his landscapes, Constable began his career largely producing portraits. Based in his native Suffolk after completing his studies at the Royal Academy, he produced paintings of local notables. His mother Ann may have helped him secure this major commission.

George Bridges was a wealthy banker who owned wharves at nearby Mistley. The group portrait of him and his family was large in scale and designed for a wall at his country house at Lawford Place. Constable was reportedly in love with Jane Bridges, the banker's daughter, who is shown seated at the harpsichord looking towards the viewer. The setting of the painting is the dining room at Lawford Place, with St Mary's Church seen through the window. Today it is in the collection of Tate Britain in Pimlico, having been acquired in 1952.

== Bibliography ==
- Charles, Victoria. Constable. Parkstone International, 2015.
- Gayford, Martin & Lyles, Anne. Constable Portraits: The Painter and His Circle. National Portrait Gallery, 2009.
- Hamilton, James. Constable: A Portrait. Hachette UK, 2022.
