= Manuel Francisco Álvarez de la Peña =

Spanish sculptor (1727–1797)

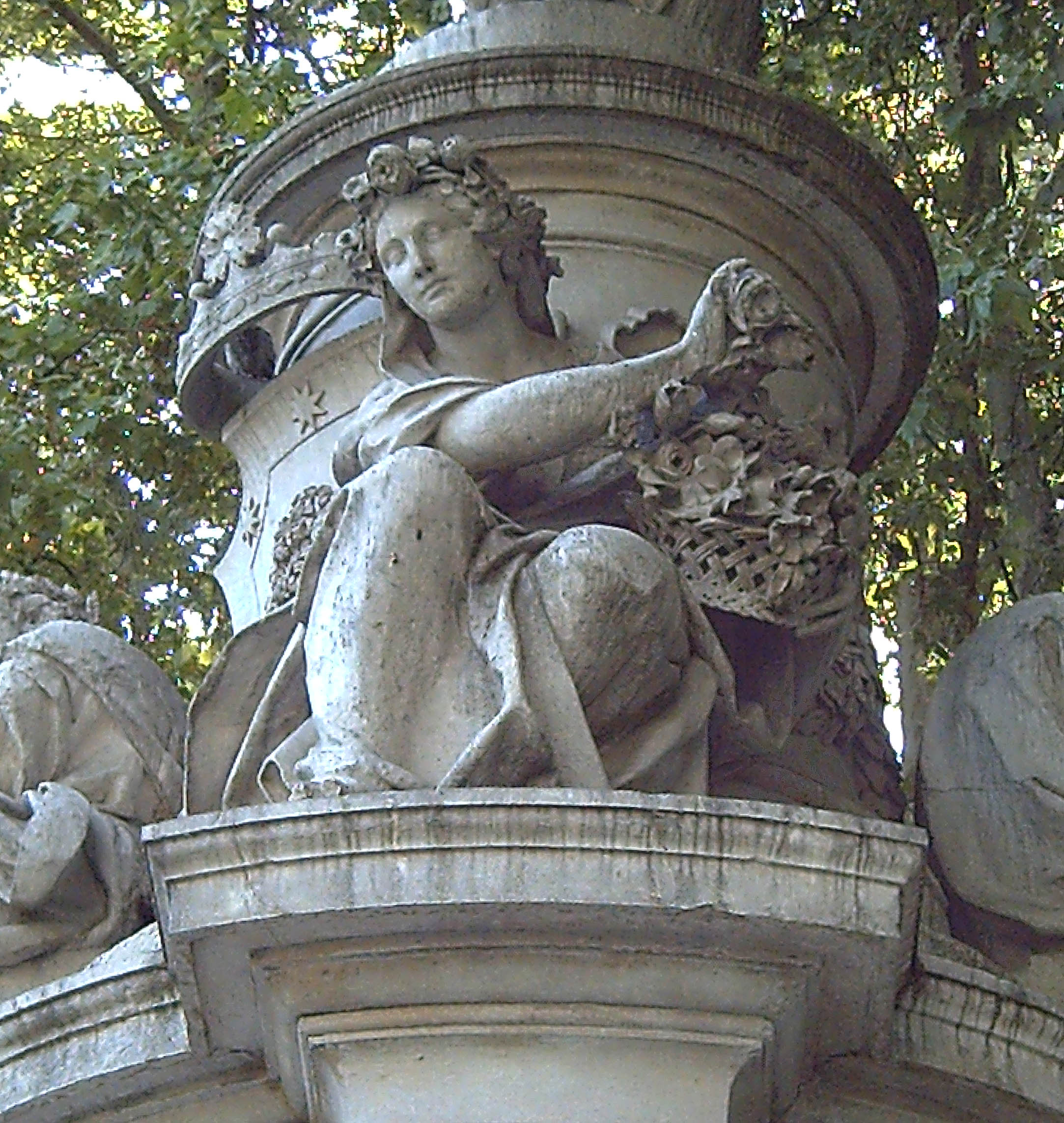

Manuel Francisco Álvarez de la Peña (1727–1797), Spanish sculptor, was born at Salamanca. He followed classical models so closely that he was styled by his countrymen El Griego, "The Greek." His works, which are very numerous, are chiefly to be found at Madrid.
