= Antonio Rocca =

Italian painter

Antonio Rocca (mid 17th century) was an Italian painter. He became a monk and worked in Rome and Piedmont. He died in Rome about 1660.
