= William Elliott (engraver) =

British engraver (1727–1766)

William Elliot
- Born: 1727; Hampton Court Palace, London, England
- Died: 1766 (aged 38–39); London, England
- Occupation: Engraver

William Elliott or Elliot (1727–1766) was an English engraver.

== Life ==
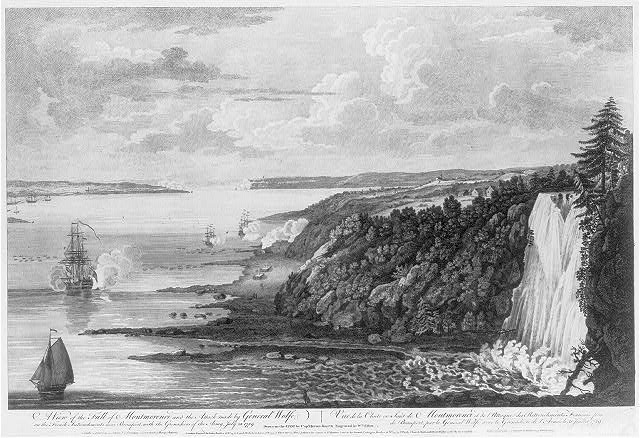
Elliott's View of the Fall of Montmorenci after Hervey Smith

Elliott was born at Hampton Court Palace, London, England in 1727. Joseph Strutt, in his Biographical Dictionary of Engravers (1785), said that he was a man "of an amiable and benevolent disposition, and greatly beloved by all who knew him"; that he "excelled in landscape etchings, which he executed with great taste" and that "the freedom of his point, in particular, was admired".

He died at his home in Church Street, Soho, in London in 1766.

== Works ==
His chief engravings are the so-called View in the Environs of Maestricht, from the picture by Aelbert Cuyp; a View of Tivoli (companion to the above), from the picture by Rosa da Tivoli, The Flight into Egypt, after Poelemburg; Kilgarren Castle, after Richard Wilson; 'Spring' and 'Summer,' after Jan van Goyen; The Setting Sun and other landscapes, after Jean Pillement; The Town and Harbour of Sauzon, after Serres, and other landscapes after Gaspar Poussin, Paul Sandby, and the Smiths of Chichester. In a series of engravings from drawings by Captain Hervey Smyth of events during the Siege of Quebec by General Wolfe in 1759, Elliott engraved A View of the Fall of Montmorenci and the Attack made by General Wolfe on the French Intrenchments near Beauport, 31 July 1759. He exhibited some of his engravings at the Society of Artists from 1761 to 1766.
