= Francesco Bruno (artist) =

Italian engraver

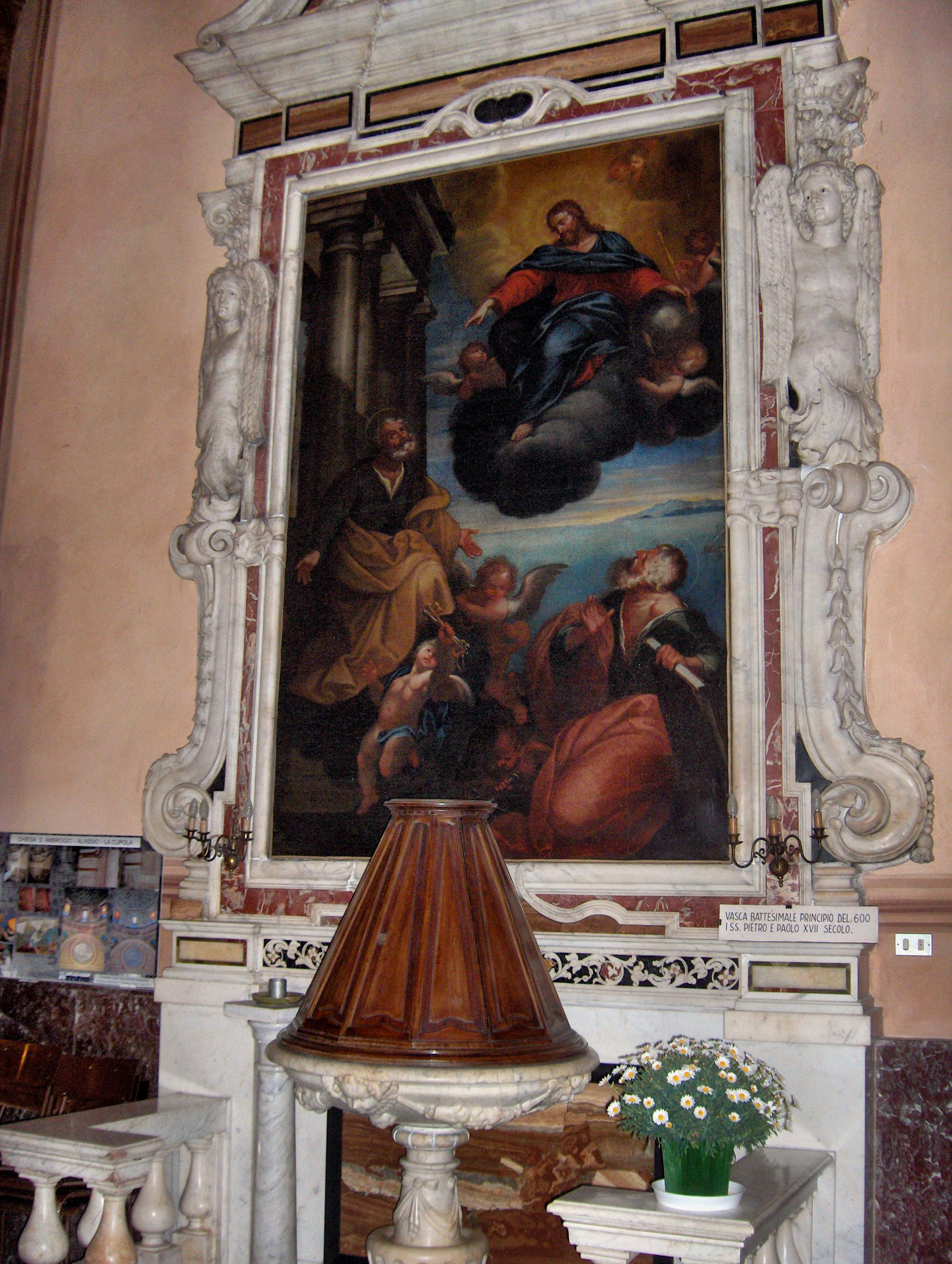

Francesco Bruno (born c. 1660 at Genoa) was an Italian engraver. He engraved a plate of The Assumption of the Virgin after Guido Reni.
