= Infanta Margarita Teresa in a Pink Dress =

Painting by Diego Velázquez

Portrait of the Infanta Margaret Theresa
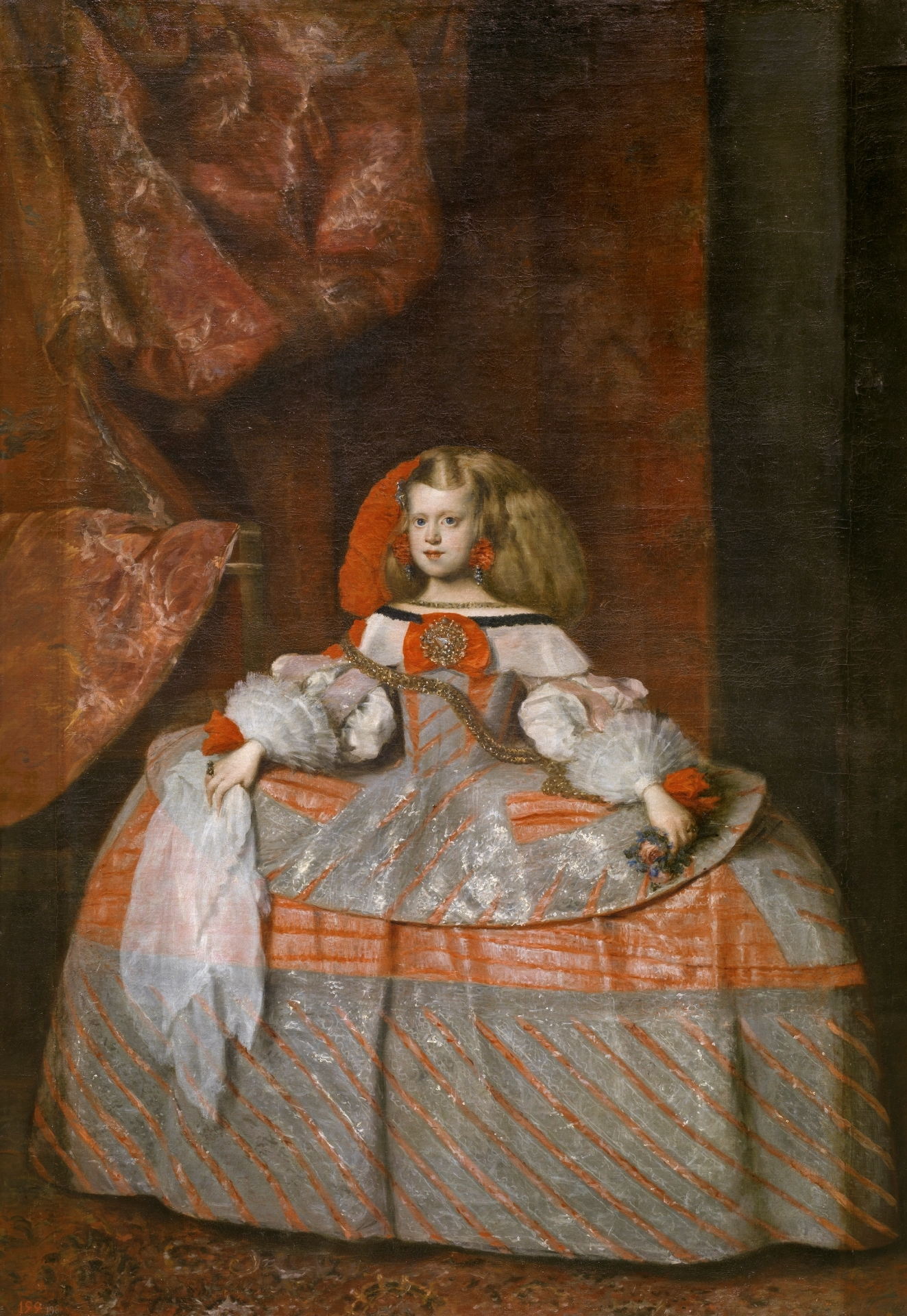
- Artist: Diego Velázquez or Juan Bautista del Mazo
- Year: 1660
- Type: Baroque
- Medium: Oil on canvas
- Dimensions: 212 cm × 147 cm (83 in × 58 in)
- Location: Museo del Prado; Madrid

Infanta Margarita Teresa in a Pink Dress is a 1660 oil on canvas portrait of Margaret Theresa of Spain, daughter of King Philip IV by the Spanish painter Diego Velázquez, though his identification as its author is not considered secure. It is now in the Prado Museum in Madrid.

It was generally considered to be the last work in his oeuvre, with the dress by Velázquez himself and the head (left unfinished on Velázquez's death) and the bottom of the curtains completed by his pupil Juan Bautista del Mazo. However, recent studies by experts suggest it may be entirely by Mazo. The Prado Museum currently assigns the work to Mazo.

Its subject was the royal most frequently portrayed by Velázquez, also appearing in his Las Meninas and Infanta Margarita Teresa in a Blue Dress. In the final years of his life he spent long periods producing portraits of her to send to the Austrian court for political reasons and in response to certain matrimonial arrangements made between the two courts. Infanta Margarita Teresa in a Blue Dress is still in Vienna as are two 1652-53 portraits of her aged one or two in a silver and pink dress. A replica of the latter of the two, with variations, is in the Liria Palace in Madrid, though this is attributed to another painter.

Until the 19th century the painting was misidentified as a portrait of Infanta Maria Theresa of Spain, child of Philip IV's first marriage (with Elisabeth of France) and later wife of Louis XIV of France. In an 1872 catalogue by the painter Pedro de Madrazo, then the Prado's director, it was still misidentified in this way. Later research revealed that it actually is Margaret Theresa, child of Philip IV's second marriage to Mariana of Austria. It was especially admired by the Impressionists and painters of subsequent movements for the lightness of its stroke.

== See also ==
- List of works by Diego Velázquez
