= 1667 in art =

Events from the year 1667 in art.

== Events ==
- In 1667, the royally sanctioned French institution of art patronage, the Académie royale de peinture et de sculpture (a division of the Académie des beaux-arts), held its first semi-public art exhibit at the Salon Carré

== Paintings ==
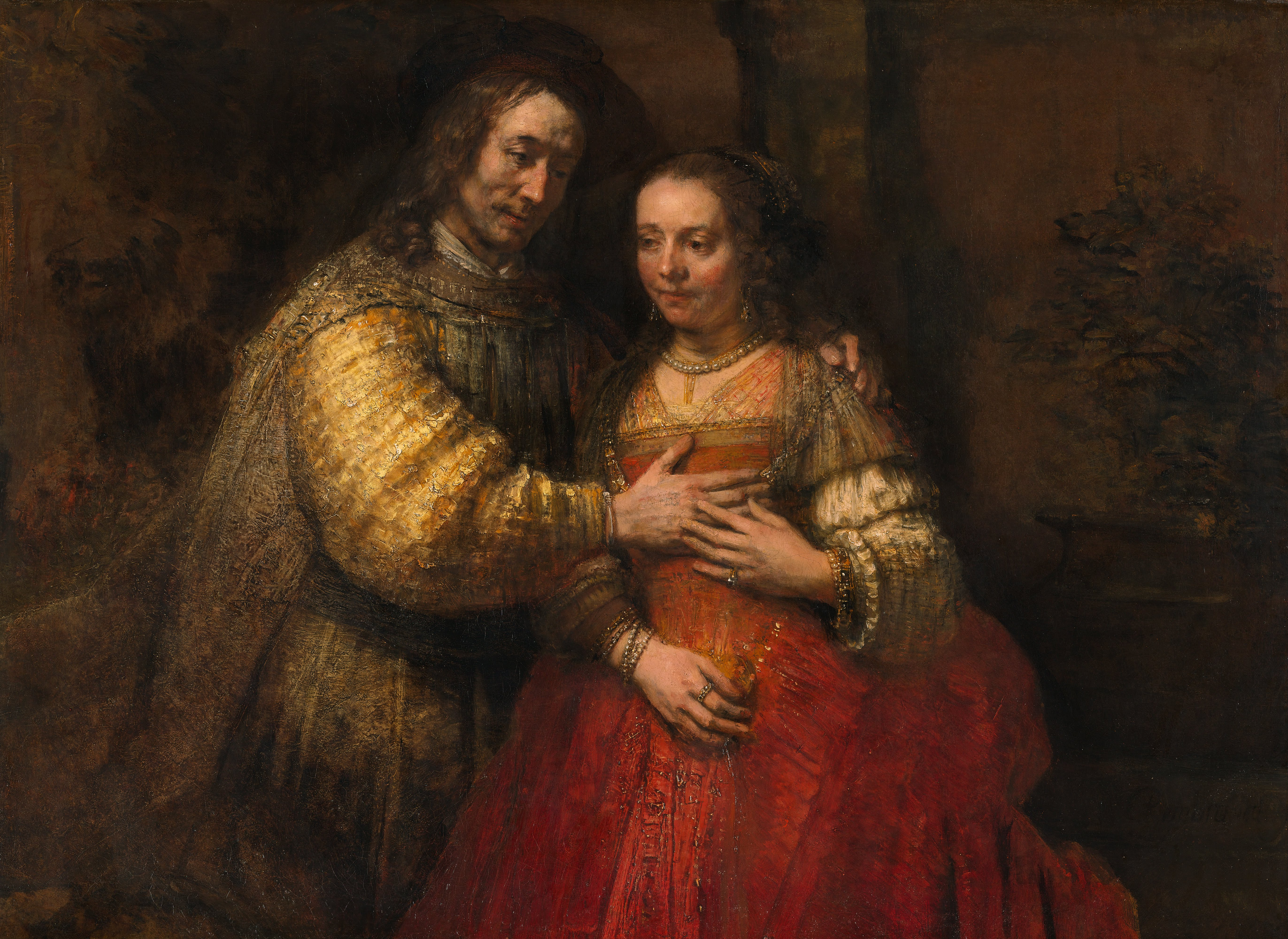
Rembrandt, The Jewish Bride

- Ludolf Bakhuizen – The Return of the Warship Hollandia in the Landsdiep near Huisduinen on 3 November 1665
- Abraham van Beijeren – Banquet Still Life (with Mouse)
- Ferdinand Bol – Portrait of Michiel de Ruyter
- Rembrandt
  - The Jewish Bride (approximate date; Rijksmuseum Amsterdam)
  - Portrait of an elderly man (Mauritshuis)
- Johannes Vermeer -Mistress and Maid (c.)

== Births ==
- January 12 - Jonathan Richardson, English portrait painter, writer on art and collector (died 1745)
- February 4 - Alessandro Magnasco, Italian Rococo painter of genre or landscape scenes (died 1749)
- May 2 - Jacob Christoph Le Blon, German painter and engraver who invented the system of three- and four-colour printing (died 1741)
- July 21 - Cristoforo Munari, Italian painter of the late-Baroque specializing in still life paintings (died 1720)
- September 9 - Felice Torelli, Italian painter of altarpieces (died 1748)
- November 5 - Christoph Ludwig Agricola, German landscape painter (died 1719)
- December 17 - Jan-Baptist Bosschaert, Flemish painter (died 1746)
- date unknown
  - Federiko Benković, Croatian late baroque painter (died 1753)
  - Francis Bird, English sculptor (died 1731)
  - Michael Feuchtmayer, German member of the Feuchtmayer family of Baroque artists (d. unknown)
  - Jan Kupecký, Czech and Slovak portrait painter (died 1740)
  - Antoine Rivalz, official painter to the town of Toulouse (died 1735)
  - Giovanni Tuccari, Italian painter of battle scenes (died 1743)
  - Cornelis Verelst, Dutch flower painter (died 1734)
  - Ned Ward, English writer and publican (died 1731)

== Deaths ==
- January - Jacob Duck, Dutch painter (born 1600)
- February 10 - Juan Bautista Martínez del Mazo, Spanish Baroque portrait and landscape painter (born 1612)
- June - Thomas de Keyser, Dutch painter and architect (born 1596)
- May 22 - Pope Alexander VII, Papal patron of the arts commissioned architectural and sculptural works by Gianlorenzo Bernini (born 1599)
- July 4 - Christiaen van Couwenbergh, Dutch Golden Age painter (born 1604)
- August 3 – Francesco Borromini, byname of Francesco Castelli, Swiss-Italian Baroque architect in Rome (born 1599)
- August 12 - Cornelius van Poelenburgh, Dutch painter (born 1590)
- September 3 - Alonso Cano, Spanish painter, architect and sculptor (born 1601)
- October 24 (buried) - Gabriël Metsu, Dutch painter (born 1629)
- December 4 - Michel Lasne, French engraver, draughtsman and collector (born 1590)
- date unknown
  - Mario Balassi, Italian painter of the Baroque period (born 1604)
  - Orfeo Boselli, Italian sculptor working in Rome (born 1597)
  - Francisco Caro, Spanish Baroque painter (born 1627)
  - Ignatius Croon, Flemish Baroque painter (born 1639)
  - Frans Francken III, Flemish painter (born 1607)
  - Jerónimo Jacinto de Espinosa, Spanish painter active in Valencia (born 1600)
  - Luigi Primo, Flemish painter of portraits and altarpieces (born 1705)
