= John Caspar Wild =

American painter

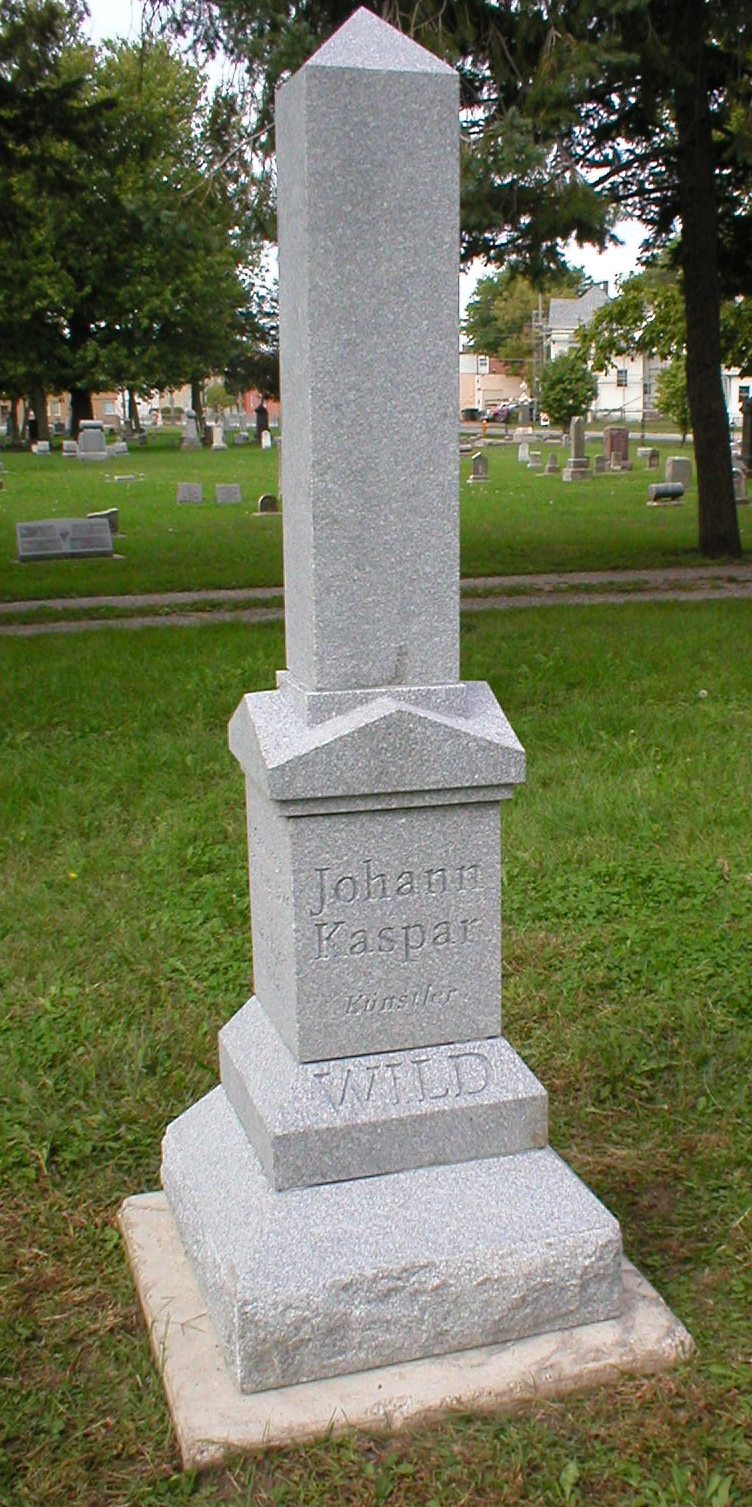
- Wild's grave monument
- Born: Johann Caspar Wild; July 1, 1804; Richterswil, Switzerland
- Died: August 12, 1846 (aged 42); Davenport, Iowa, U.S.
- Known for: Painting, printmaking

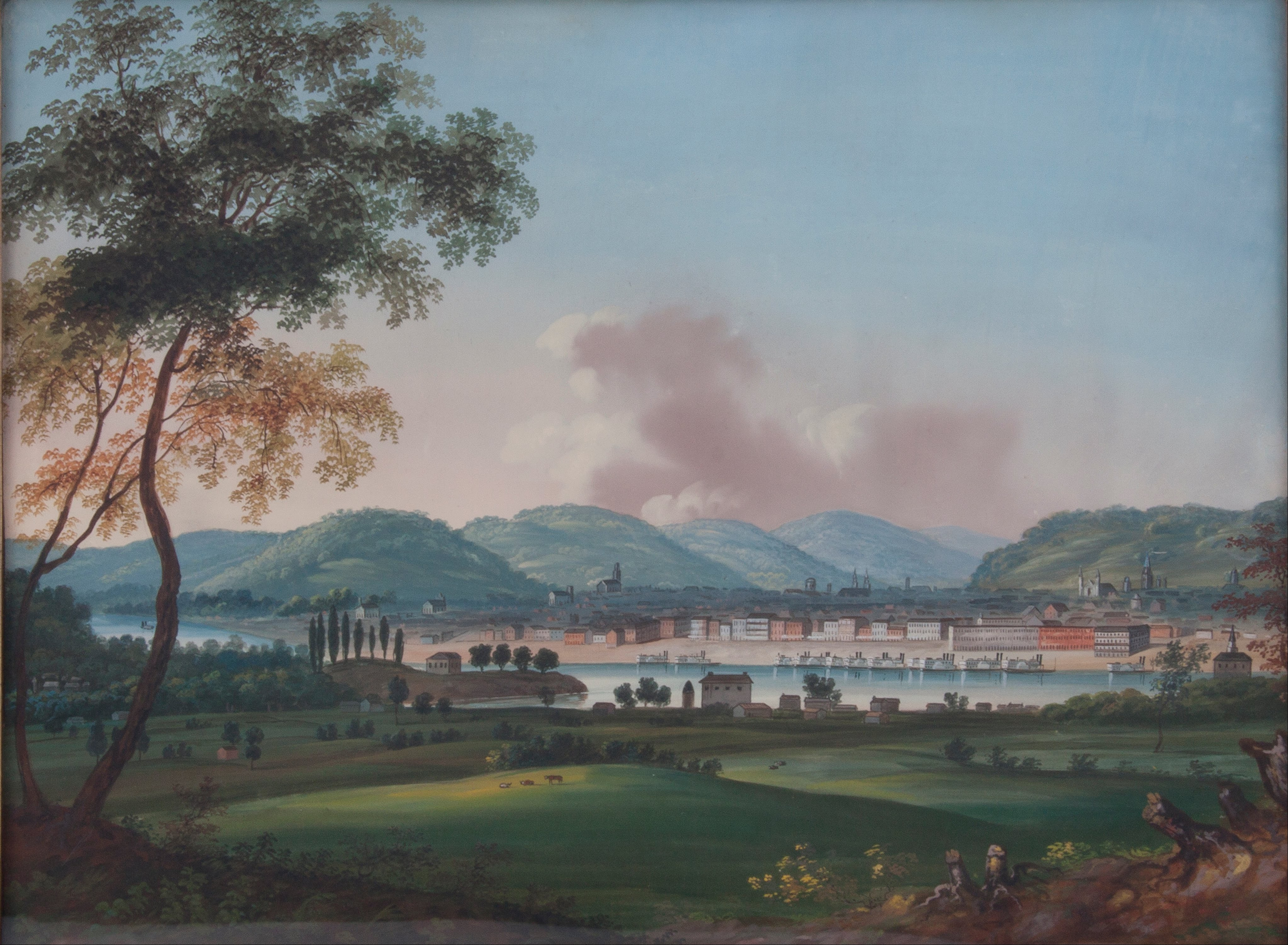
Cincinnati from behind Newport Barracks, 1835

John Caspar Wild (or J.C. Wild) (1804 – August 12, 1846) was a Swiss-American painter and lithographer. He created early city views and landscapes of Philadelphia, Cincinnati, St. Louis, and Davenport, Iowa.

Wild specialized in hand-colored lithographs. These views, particularly the Valley of the Mississippi Illustrated, were some of the first depictions of the American West.

== Early life ==
Wild was born in Richterswil in the Canton of Zürich in Switzerland.

== Career ==
He moved to Paris, France. In 1832, he moved to Philadelphia, Pennsylvania. He later moved to St. Louis, Missouri. In summer 1844, he moved a final time, to Davenport, Iowa, a small town in the upper Mississippi River Valley.

Wild fell gravely ill with tuberculosis in the summer of 1846, and he was taken in by Davenport millinery businessman George L. Webb. On his deathbed, Wild reflected upon his childhood and said that he yearned to die in homeland in Switzerland, but it was a wish that was to not be fulfilled. Wild died on August 12, 1846. Wild was laid to rest nearly on the banks of the river, which he had painted for years. Wild's grave site was unmarked for decades.

== Notable collections ==
- University of Pennsylvania, 1842, from collection of the Library Company of Philadelphia

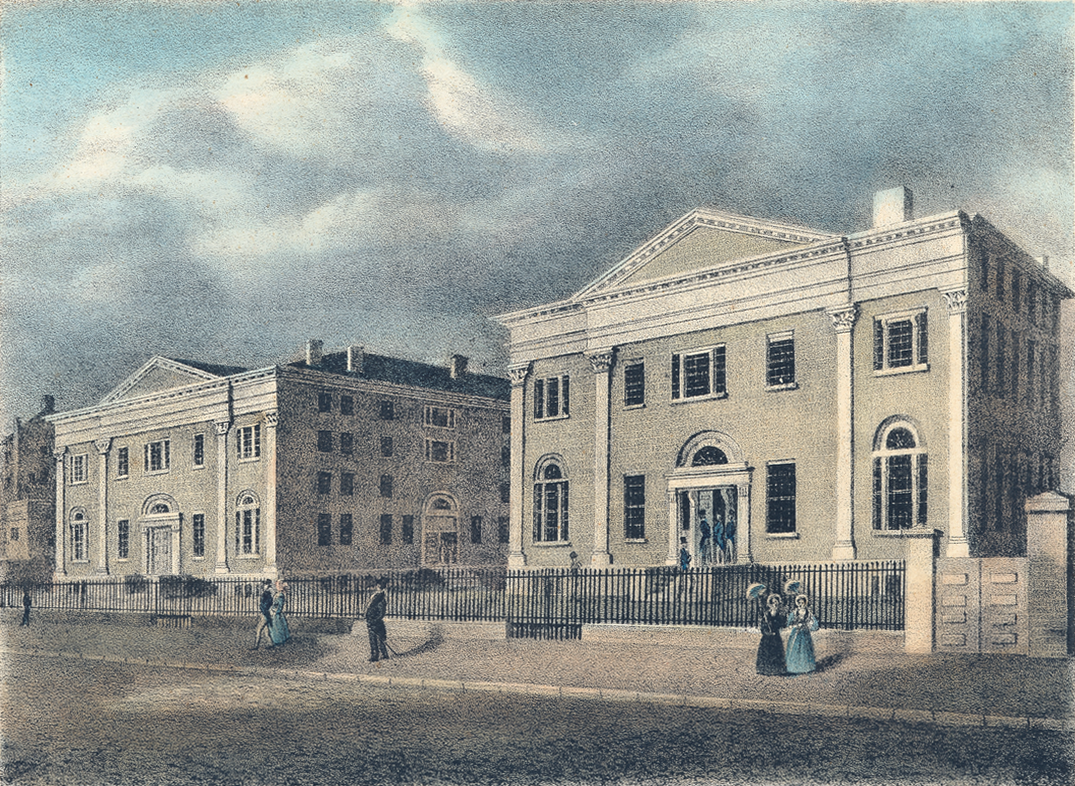
University of Pennsylvania campus, located on the west side of 9th Street between Market and Chestnut Streets in Philadelphia, in hand colored lithograph created in 1842 by John Caspar Wild of Penn's then Medical Hall (left) and College Hall (right), both built 1829–1830

- Pennsylvania Hospital, circa 1840, Library Company of Philadelphia
