= 1719 in art =

Events from the year 1719 in art.

== Events ==
- Jean-Baptiste Oudry becomes a member of the Académie Royale de Peinture et de Sculpture.

== Works ==
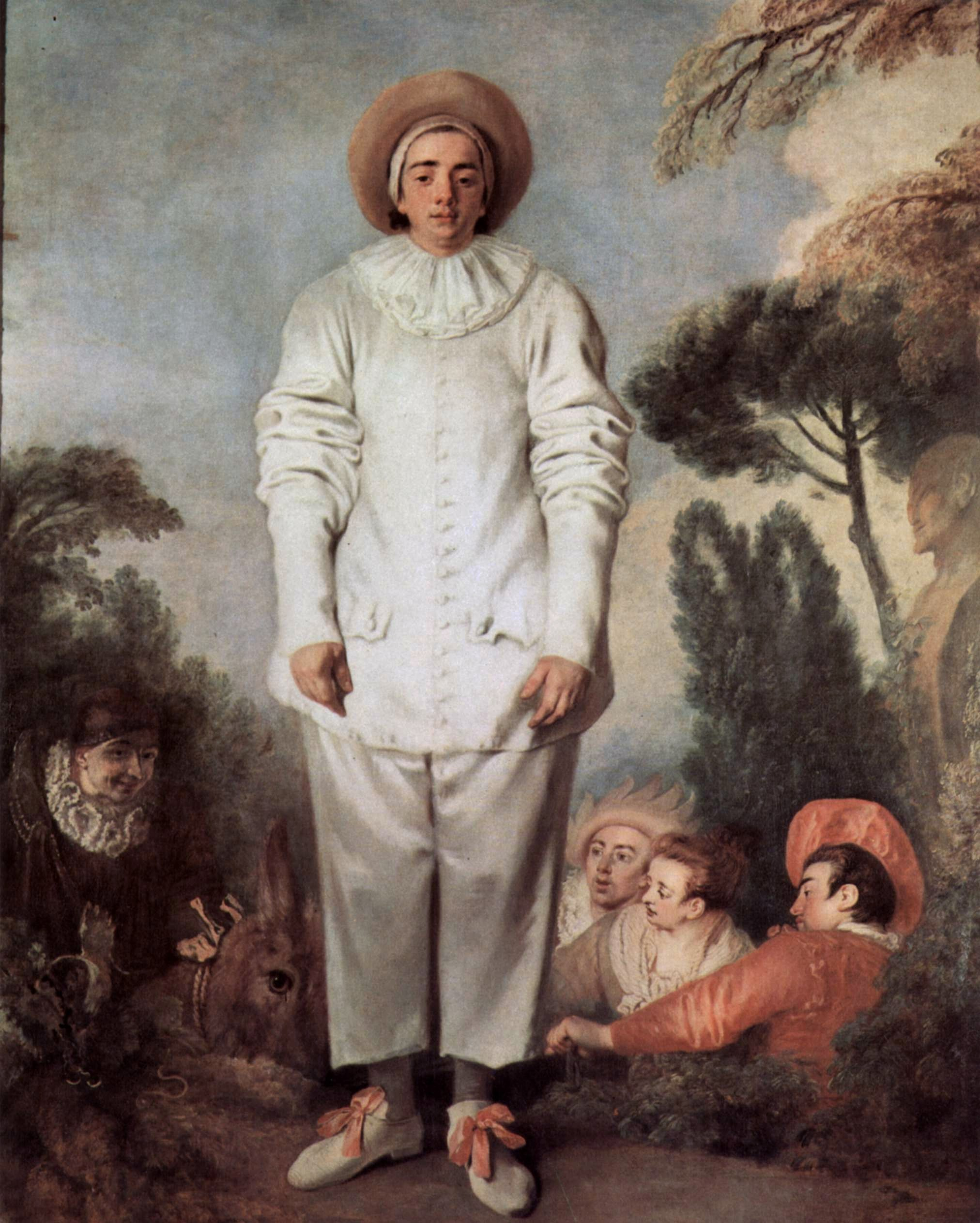
Antoine Watteau, commedia dell'arte player Pierrot, c. 1718–19, (traditionally identified as "Gilles") (Louvre)

- Davies brothers of Wrexham – Chirk Castle gates (wrought iron)
- Antoine Watteau – Pierrot

== Births ==
- February 6 – Alberto Pullicino, Maltese painter (died 1759)
- February 27 – Alejandro González Velázquez, Spanish late-Baroque architect and painter (died 1772)
- May 29 – Lorenzo De Caro, Neapolitan painter (died 1777)
- August 25 – Charles-Amédée-Philippe van Loo, French painter (died 1795)
- September 16 – Étienne Ficquet, French engraver (died 1794)
- October 13 – Josef Ignaz Mildorfer, Austrian painter (died 1775)
- date unknown
  - Dominic Serres, French-born painter of naval maritime scenes (died 1793)
  - Angelica Le Gru Perotti, Italian painter of the Rococo (died 1776)
  - Liu Yong, Chinese politician and calligrapher in the Qing Dynasty (died 1804)

== Deaths ==
- May 3 – Pierre Le Gros the Younger, French sculptor, active in Baroque Rome (born 1666)
- May 7 – Sebastiano Bombelli, Italian Baroque painter, mainly in Venice (born 1635)
- July 22 – Giovanni Gioseffo dal Sole, Italian landscape painter and engraver from Bologna (born 1654)
- August 8 – Christoph Ludwig Agricola, German painter (born 1667)
- September – Jan Weenix, Dutch painter (born 1642)
- September 6 – Carlo Cignani, Italian painter of the Bolognese school (born 1628)
- October 14 – Arnold Houbraken, Dutch painter and writer from Dordrecht (born 1660)
- October 15 – Jan Mortel, Dutch painter (born 1650)
- November 2 – Georg Johann Mattarnovi, German sculptor and architect active in St Petersburg (date of birth unknown)
- November 19 – Hendrick van Streeck, Dutch Golden Age painter of church interiors (born 1659)
- date unknown
  - Jan Baptist Brueghel, Flemish Baroque flower painter (born 1647)
  - José García Hidalgo, Spanish Baroque painter (born 1646)
  - Johann Ulrich Kraus, German illustrator, engraver and publisher (born 1655)
  - Arnold Frans Rubens, Flemish Baroque painter specialized in cabinet pictures of landscapes and battle scenes (born 1687)
  - Giuseppe Antonio Torricelli, Italian sculptor and gem-engraver of the late Baroque, active in Florence (born 1662)
