= Cristoforo Dall'Acqua =

Italian painter

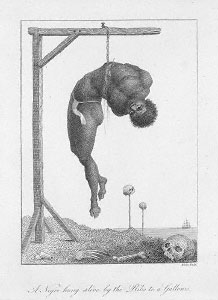
Negro Hung Alive by the Ribs by Cristoforo Dall'Acqua, Amsterdam University Library; design based on earlier print by William Blake

Cristoforo Dall'Acqua (1 April 1734 – 10 November 1787) was an Italian painter and engraver.

Dall'Acqua was born in Vicenza to a family of noble origins but of modest fortunes. He initially studied under Giovanni Antonio Remondini, a prominent printer in Bassano, originally from Padua, and worked with a number of artists including A. Orio, A. Gabrieli, A. Canals and F. Ricci. Dall'Acqua primarily worked on book illustrations and reproductions of paintings, although he later took commissions to paint portraits. He died in Vicenza in 1787 and was buried at the Chiesa di Santa Croce in San Giacomo Maggiore.
