= Christian Gottlob Fechhelm =

German painter

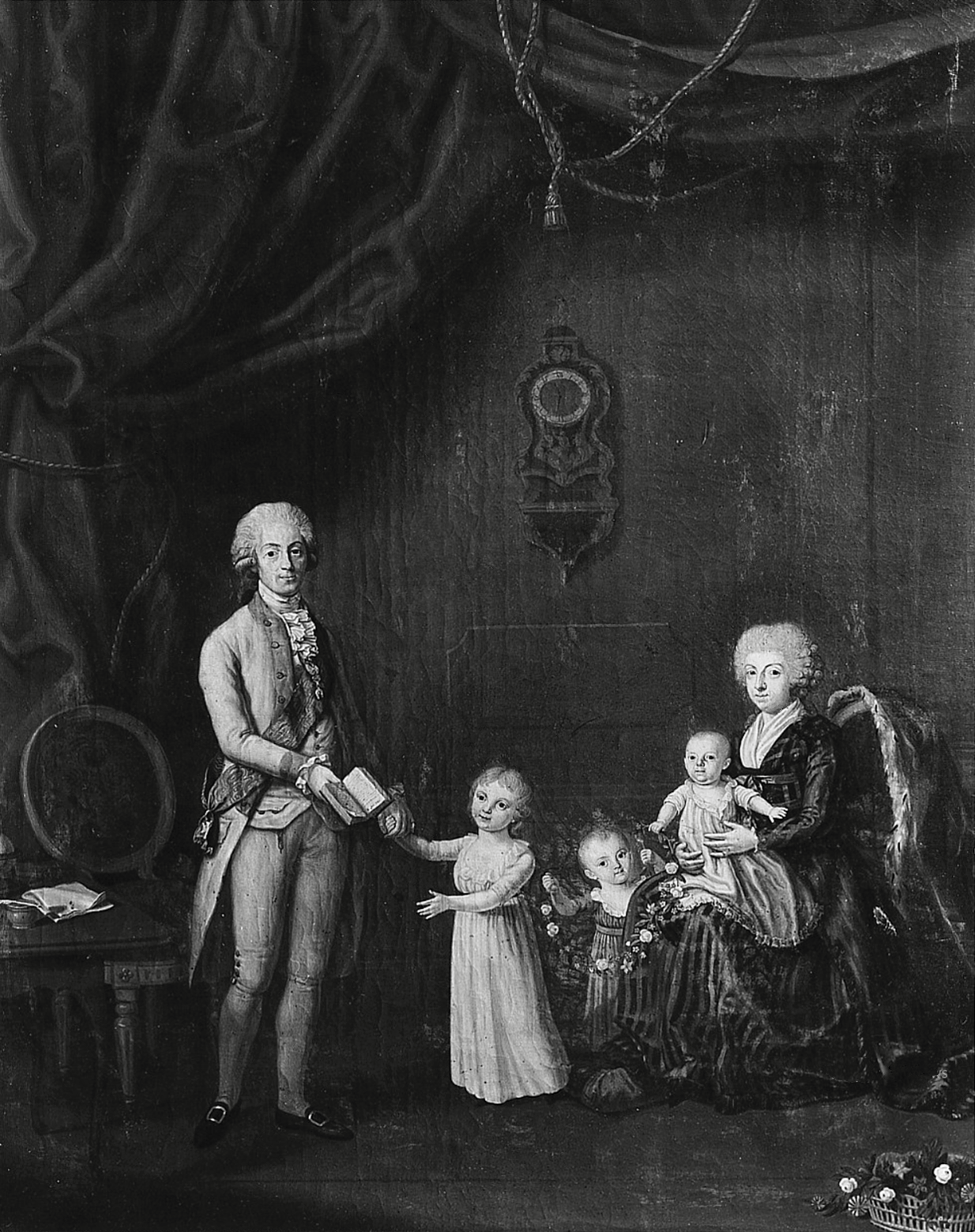
Maximilian of Saxony and his family by Christian Gottlob Fechhelm

Christian Gottlob Fechhelm (1732–1816) was a portrait and historical painter, born in Dresden. He studied under Mengs, Manjocky, and Hutin, first portrait painting, and then miniature. In the Seven Years' War Maria Theresa commissioned him to paint the portraits of the generals engaged in that campaign for the Military School at Vienna. Fechhelm died at Dresden in 1816. His son, Karl Christian, who was born at Dresden in 1770, and died in 1826, was likewise a painter.

== Gallery ==
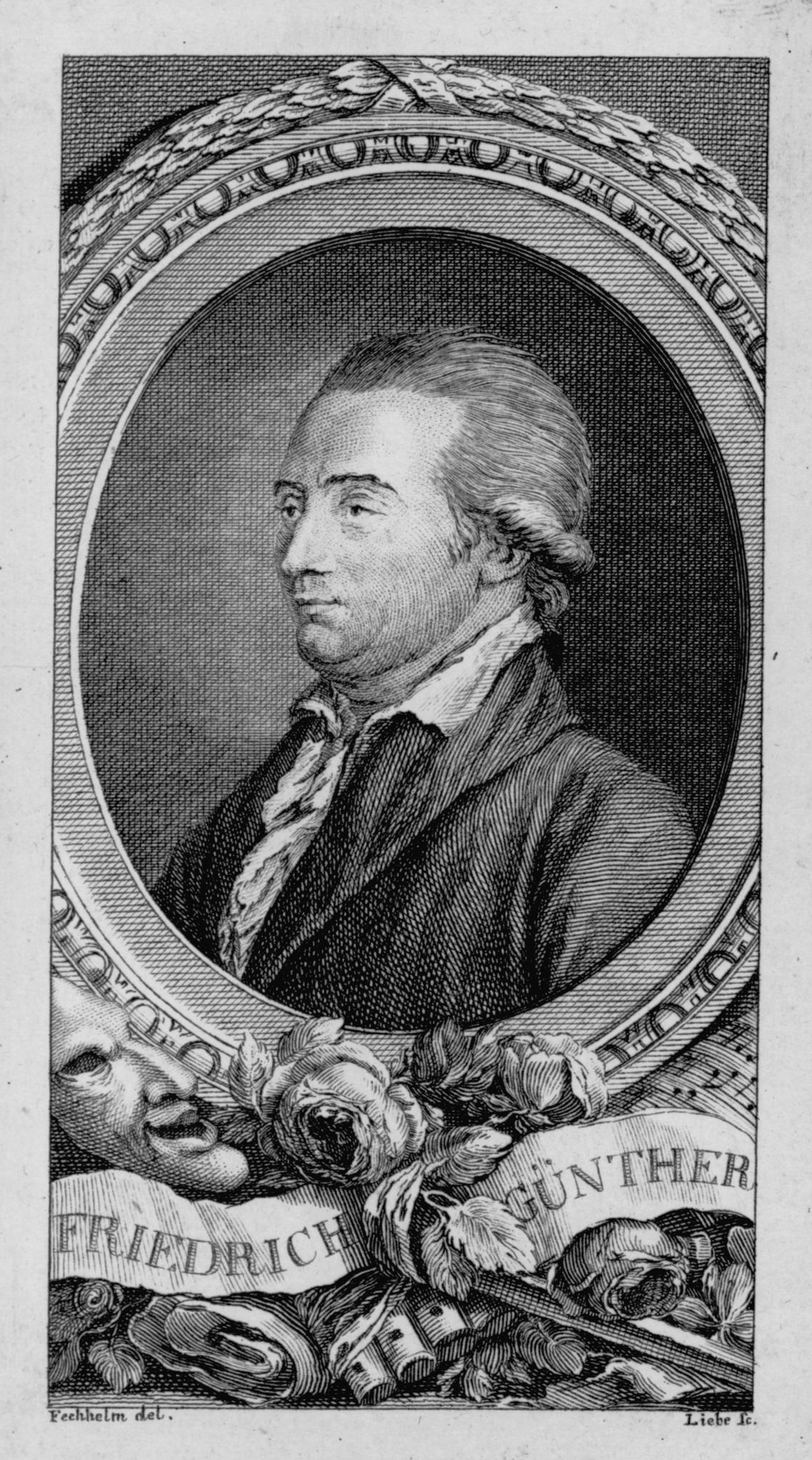
Portrait of Friedrich Günther

Opera costume design

Portrait of Anna Maria Hellbach

== See also ==
- List of German painters
