= Per Floding =

Swedish designer and engraver

Per Gustaf Floding (3 March 1731 - 17 October 1791) was a Swedish designer and engraver. He was an instructor at the Royal Swedish Academy of Fine Arts.l

== Biography ==
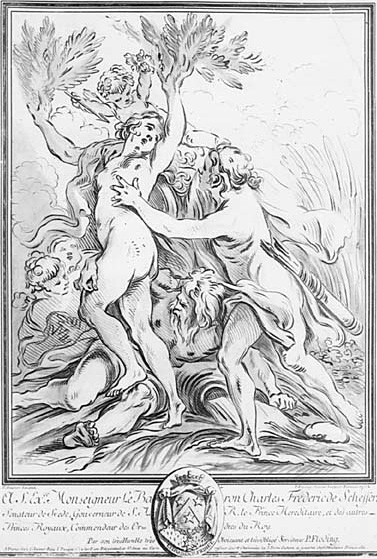
Apollon et Daphné

Floding was born at Stockholm, Sweden. He first trained under Swedish architect and engraver Jean Eric Rehn (1717-1793). In 1755 at sixteen years of age, Floding received local support to travel in Paris to learn engraving and work at the academy under the guidance of several notable painters and engravers. He was instructed by François-Philippe Charpentier (1734-1817) and resided chiefly in Paris. He developed rich talents and with his progress flowed commissions of increasingly more generous benefits.

In 1761, Floding produced engravings including King Adolf Frederick on his throne with the estates by his side and Minerva against taking four children. The engravings brought such a satisfaction, that the Estates awarded him 2,000 livres annually, and the following year 600 livres for the procurement of equipment and instruments. Using these new tools in 1762 he developed what became known as the "laver insertion method" .

In 1763, Floding was appointed Royal Majesty Engraver and Garde d' Estampes of Crown Prince and future King Gustav III of Sweden. He returned in 1764 to Stockholm, where he began working on the creation of an engraving school, which also came into being. Through this school, the idea of a complete art school for Sweden gained new life. In 1768 the Royal Drawing Academy, which dated to 1735, was revived as the Royal Swedish Academy of Fine Arts (Kungliga Akademien för de fria konsterna). He received appointment to this post where until 1777, he served as professor of drawing at the academy and attended to secretarial duties. Later Floding came into conflict with the leadership at the academy and hinted that something was not right with the Academy's funds. However, during his time there he educated numerous disciples.

== Selected work ==
He also engraved several plates, both in line and in aquatint, among which are the following:

- The Portrait of Alexander Roslin, painter; after Roslin
- Apollo and Daphne; after F. Boucher.
- Soldiers guarding a Prison; after the same.
- A Girl sleeping, with a Dog by her; after J. B. Deshais.
- Gustavus III., King of Sweden; after L. Pasch.
- A Battle; after Casanova.

== Other sources ==
- Floding, Per Gustaf in Profil (second edition, 1908)

Attribution:

- This article or parts of it are based on the article Floding, Per Gustaf from Swedish biographical hand dictionary (SBH), published in 1906.
