= Jan Joost van Cossiau =

Jan Joost van Cossiau (1662–c.1732) was a Flemish landscape painter and engraver.

== Life ==
Jan was born in Roeselare, Spanish Netherlands on 30 August 1662, first son of the local GP Judocus Cossiau, and Jacoba de Burchgrave. He was baptised as Carolus Jacobus Cossiau, after his maternal grandfather who was his godfather. However, Cossiau must have been called Jan after his paternal grandfather who died a few months before his birth, but traditionally would have been his godfather otherwise. He spent most of his career in Frankfurt am Main. In Germany his sister Isabella lived with him, most likely as housekeeper/maid. His landscapes usually include people, and also often buildings and cattle. They are in the “Italian style” and generally resemble those of Gaspard Dughet (1613–1675). Cossiau worked for Lothar Franz von Schönborn at his electoral court, as well as at his Schloss Weißenstein (castle). He was also director of the electoral gallery at Pommersfelden, where he established the final directory of paintings, after the first survey by Johann Rudolph Bys. In order to extend his gallery, Lothar Franz sent his two gallery directors often to the Netherlands and Italy. Jan Joost van Cossiau died around 1732, maybe around Mainz.

== Gallery ==
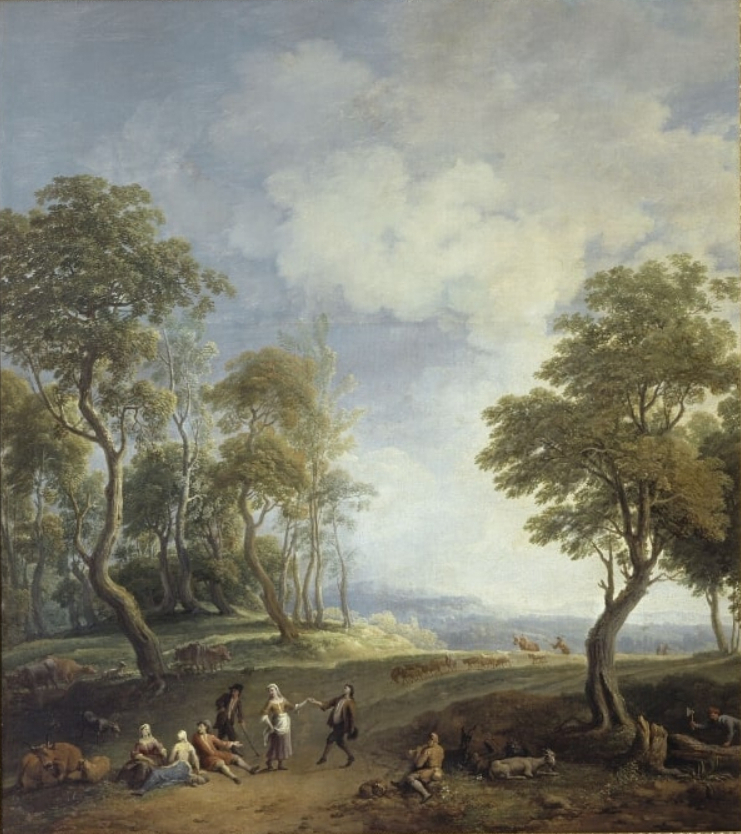
Village feast, painting by Jan Joost van Cossiau, 1st quarter of 18th century

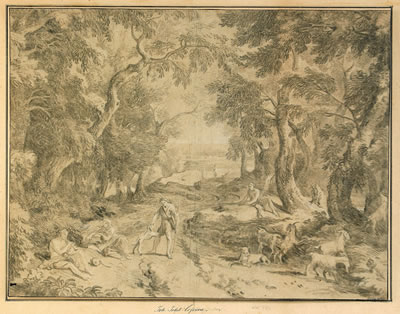
Resting herdsmen in woodland engraving by Jan Joost van Cossiau
