= Christopher Elias Heiss =

German painter

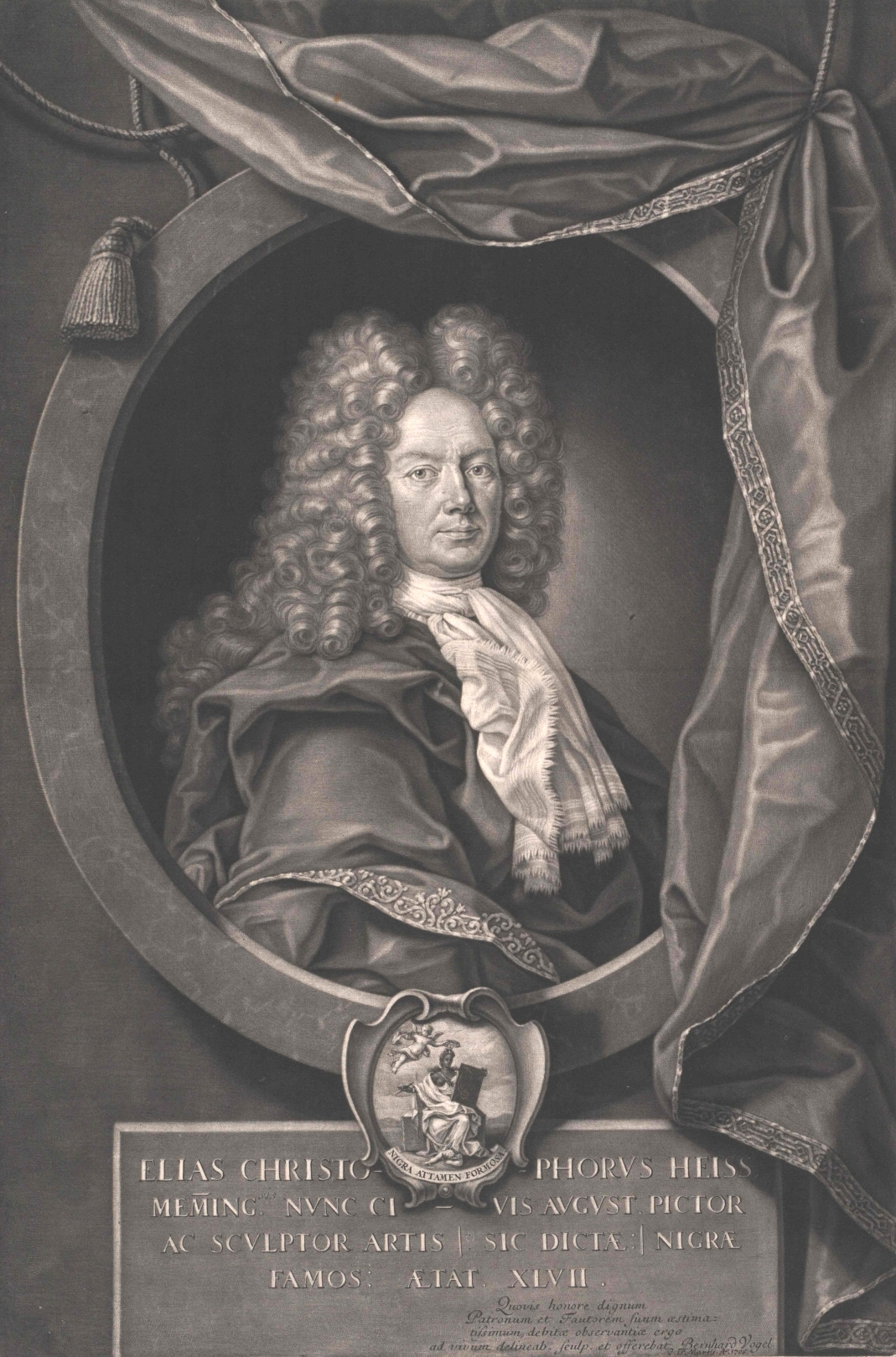
Elias Christoph Heiss (by Bernhard Vogel)

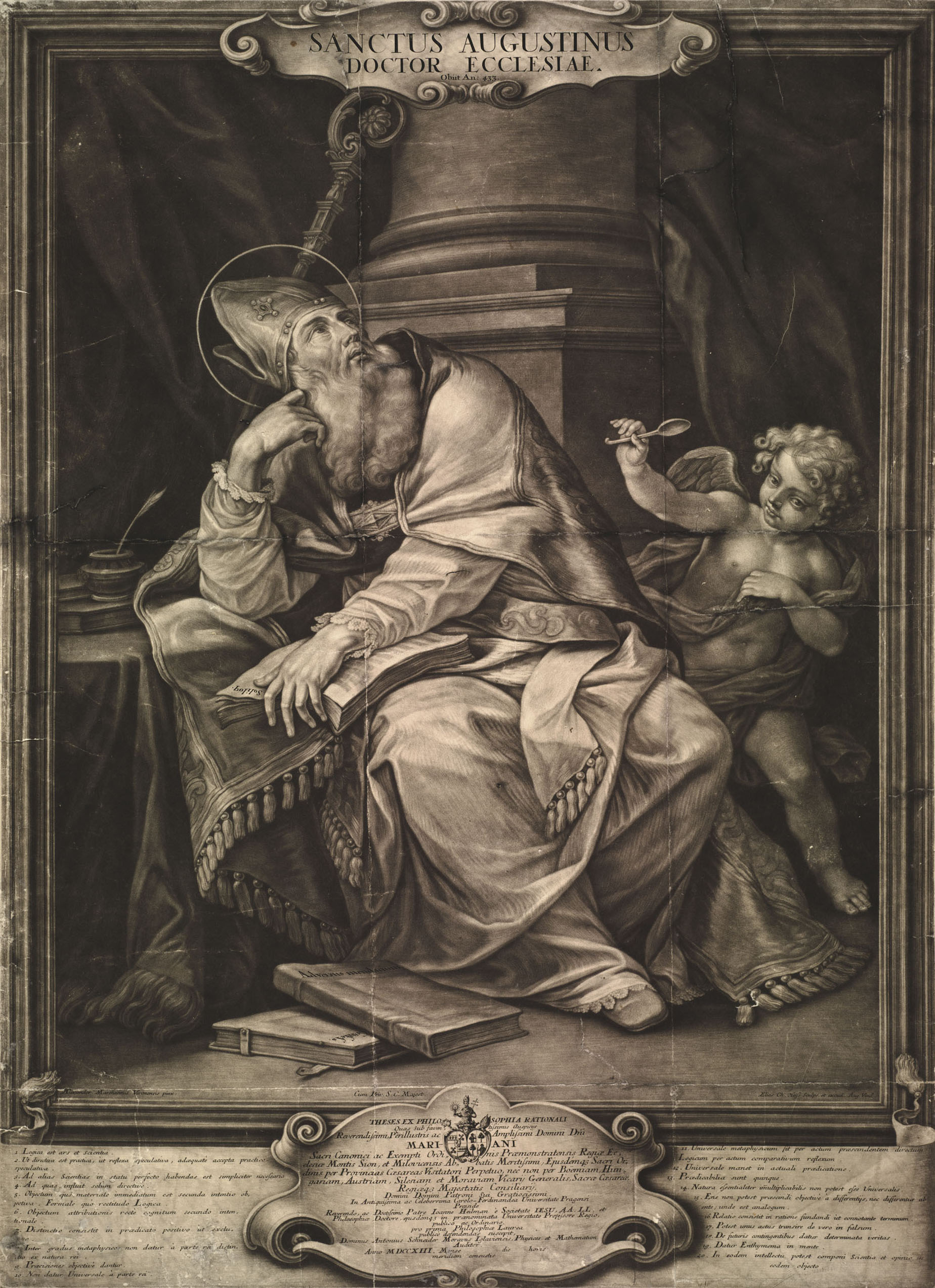
Saint Augustine, 1713, by Christoph Elias Heiss

Christopher Elias Heiss (1660–1731) was a German painter from Memmingen, Swabia.

Born in 1660 (although many sources claim 1670 or even 1760), he painted portraits well, he was mostly distinguished by his mezzotints, which he executed on an uncommonly large scale, some of his plates being three feet high and two feet wide.
