= Bartolomeo Letterini =

Italian painter

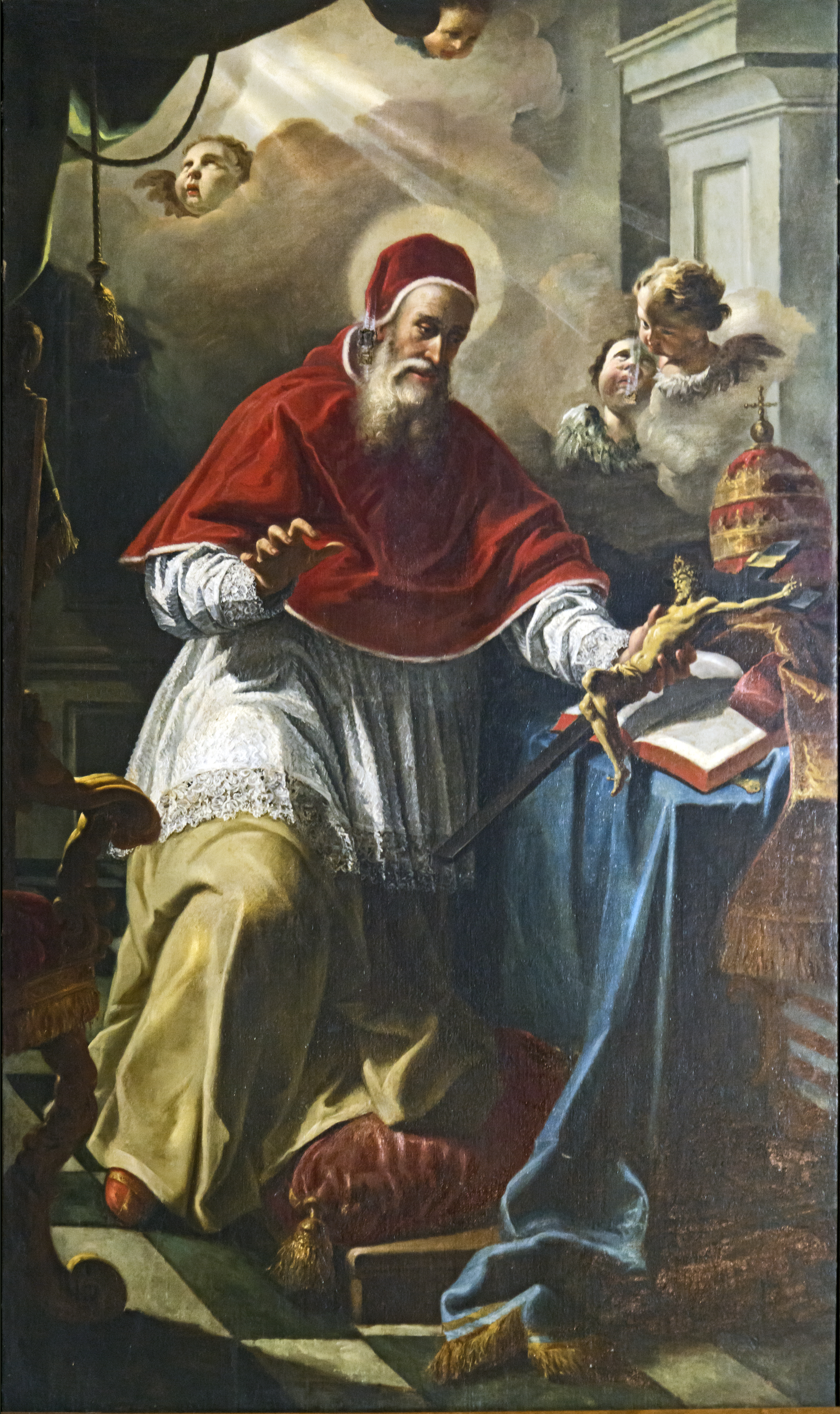
Pope Pius V (San Zanipolo)

Bartolomeo Letterini (or Litterini) (1669-after 1731) was an Italian painter of the Baroque period. He was born at Venice and instructed by his father, Agostino Letterini. He was an imitator of Titian. There is a large canvas by him at San Stae in Venice.
