= Tobias Querfurt =

German artist

Tobias Querfurt, also Tobias Querfurt the Elder, (1660 – 13 September 1734) was a German painter, draughtsman, and engraver.

Information regarding Querfurt's birth is unknown. He painted primarily landscapes and portraits. He instructed his son August Querfurt who also became a painter. He died in Wolfenbüttel in 1734.
