= Andrés Pérez (artist) =

Spanish painter

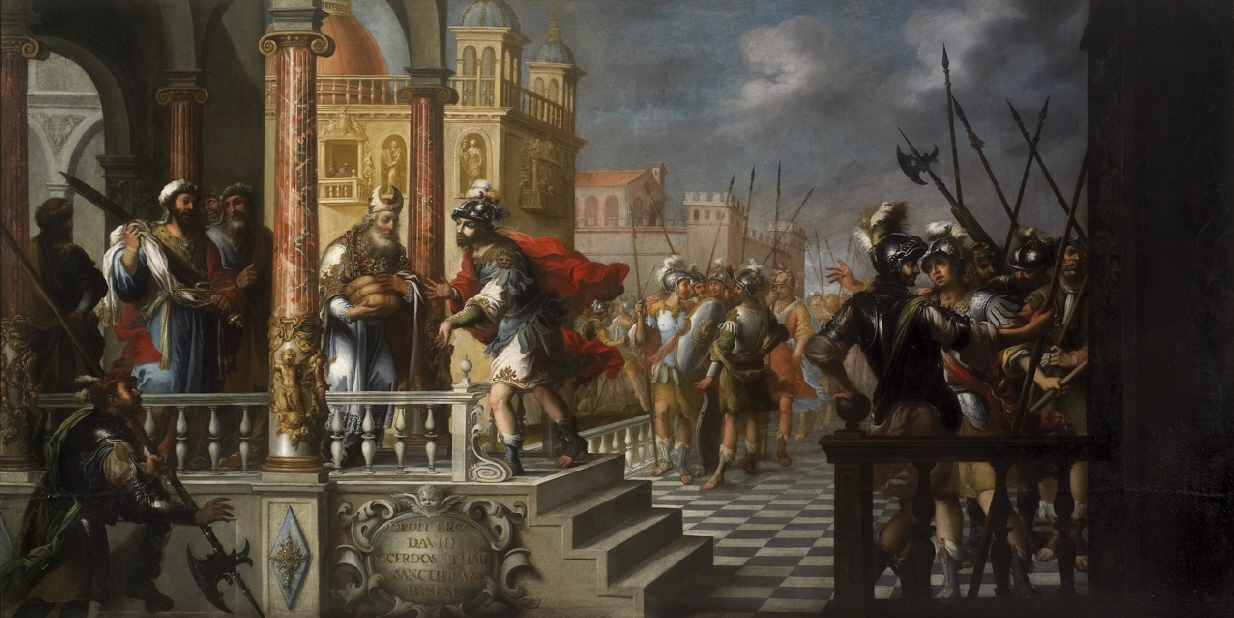
David and Abimelech by Andrés Pérez, Museum of Fine Arts of Seville, 1720

Andrés Pérez (c. 1660–1727) was a Spanish Baroque painter.

Pérez was born to Francisco Pérez de Pineda, a Seville painter active between 1664 and 1673. He attended the Academia de Bellas Artes (Seville). He could have been influenced by Bartolomé Esteban Murillo through his father or directly in Murillo's studio. The art historian Juan Agustín Ceán Bermúdez said that the three paisajes de la escritura alusivos al Sacramento, signed in 1707, that were in the tabernacle of the church of Santa Lucía, revealed "how much the Sevillian painters were separating from the good maxims of Murillo". These works were destroyed in 1936 but since then were identified as two paintings of Pérez's works preserved in the Museum of Fine Arts of Seville: Abraham and Melchizedek and Daniel before Abimelech.

Murillo's influence is best seen in the series of the Fathers of the Latin Church in the Museum of Huelva, from the convent of Augustinian Recollects of populism in Seville, or the judge Christ with the Virgin and Saints Francis And Sunday, preserved in the museum.

However, it was in flower painting that, according to Ceán, Pérez would have stood out especially, and in this genre all that is known of his hand is a San Joaquin St. Anne and the Virgin girl in flowers wreath at the Museum Fine Arts, Cordoba, in which the sacred occasion, treated with tenderness, is enhanced by precious treatment of flowers, also present as decorative details in the paintings of the series of The Infancy of Christ, preserved in the parish Puerto Serrano (Cádiz) .
