= Gao Qipei =

Chinese painter and official

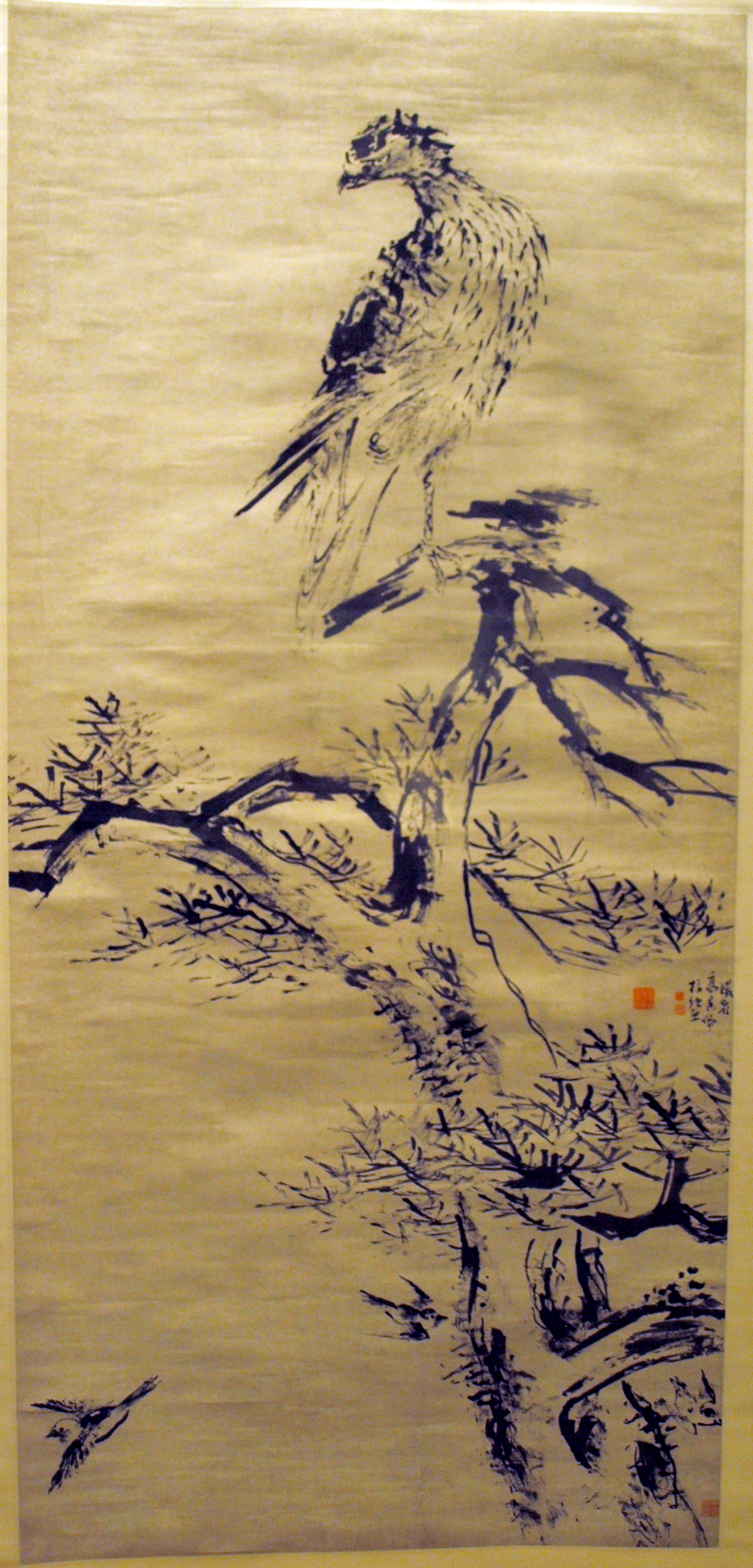
Hanging scroll painting by Gao Qipei: "Finger Painting of Eagle and Pine Trees". On display at the Shanghai Museum.

Gao Qipei (Chinese: 高其佩; pinyin: Gāo Qípeì; 1660–1734) was born in Tieling to a family of Manchu ethnicity. He found success as an official in southern China; however, he is now primarily recognized for his achievements as a painter.

== Artistic Career ==
Initially, he earned recognition as an artist who did landscapes and figures in the traditional style. By the age of twenty, he had become known as an eccentric, who preferred using his hands -palms, fingers, nails- in place of a traditional Chinese brush. This style had precedents as Zhang Zao also preferred finger painting, but Gao Qipei went further. He grew his fingernails long to make them more effective instruments, and used his entire hand to create a highly individualized style.

== Sources ==
- Chinese Paintings in the Ashmolean Museum Oxford(51) Oxford ISBN 1-85444-132-9
- Rijksmuseum
- Cornell Museum handbook on him
