= 1641 in art =

List of years in art	(table)
- … 1631; 1632; 1633; 1634; 1635; 1636; 1637; 1638; 1639; 1640; 1641; 1642; 1643; 1644; 1645; 1646; 1647; 1648; 1649; 1650; 1651 …
- Art; Archaeology; Architecture; Literature; Music; Philosophy; Science; +...

Events from the year 1641 in art.

== Events ==
- Claude Lorrain completes a series of twelve etchings of land- and seascapes.
- Gerard Dou and Diego Velázquez are painting.

== Paintings ==
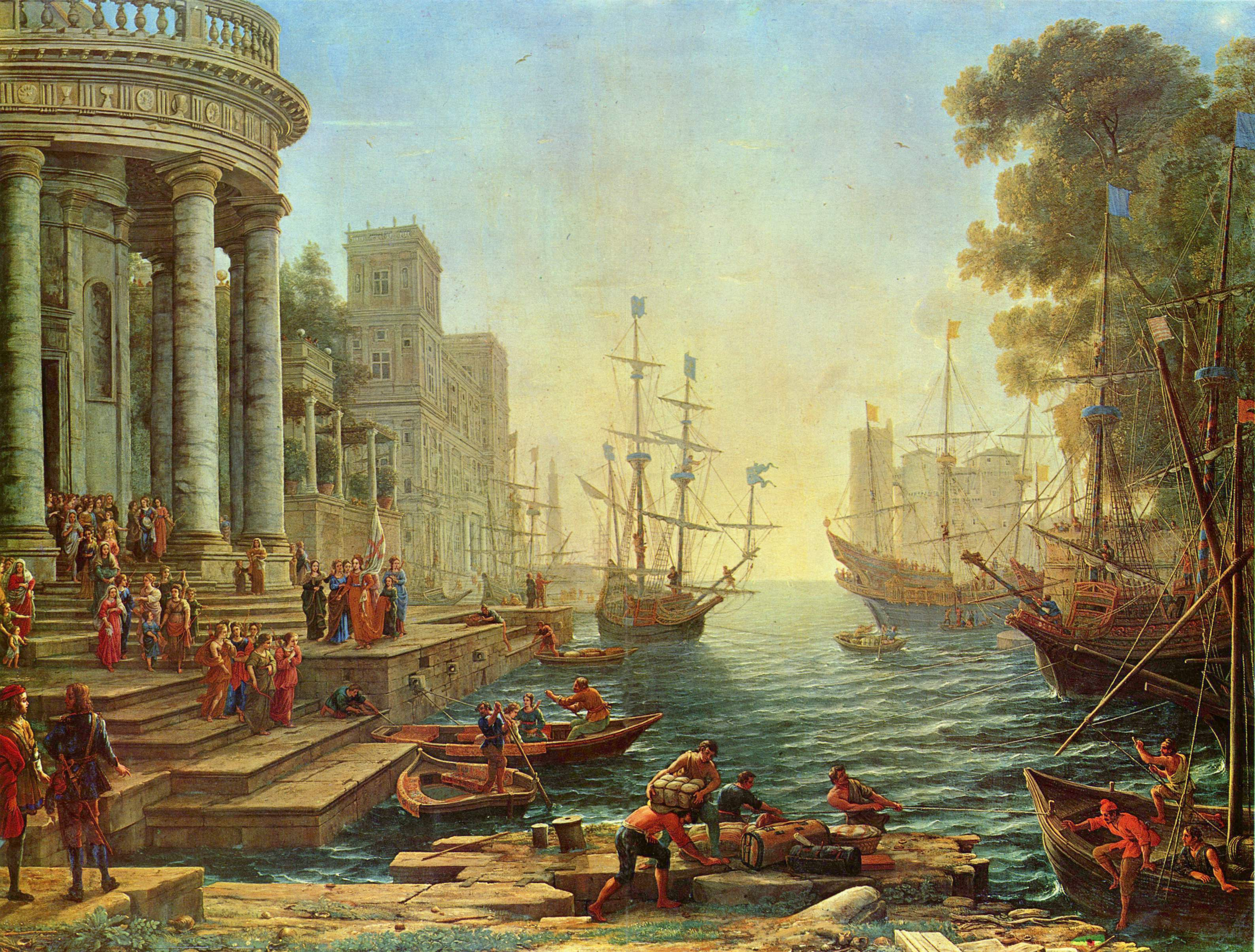
Claude – The Embarkation of St. Ursula

- Claude Lorrain – The Embarkation of St. Ursula
- Guercino
  - The Flagellation of Christ
  - The Suicide of Cato
- Willem Claesz. Heda – The Blackcurrant Pie
- Luis de Morales – Madonna della Purità
- Le Nain brothers – Venus at Vulcan's Forge
- Nicolas Poussin – Time Rescuing Truth from the Assaults of Discord and Envy
- Rembrandt
  - The Girl in a Picture Frame
  - The Scholar at the Lectern
  - The Concord of the State
  - Portrait of Agatha Bas
  - Portrait of Nicolaes van Bambeeck
  - Portrait of the Mennonite preacher Cornelius Claesz Anslo and his wife Aeltje Gerritsdr Schouten
  - Saskia as Flora
  - The Windmill (etching)
- Andrea Sacchi – Marcantonio Pasqualini Crowned by Apollo
- Sebastian Stoskopff – Great Vanity
- Sir Anthony van Dyck – Self-portrait
- Johannes Cornelisz Verspronck – Girl in a Blue Dress

== Births ==
- May – Johann Weikhard von Valvasor, Carniolan nobleman, scientist, writer, draughtsman, and polymath (died 1693)
- May 17 – Pierre Monier, French painter (died 1703)
- September 8 – Jacobus Storck, Dutch Golden Age painter (died 1700)
- September 11 – Gerard de Lairesse, Dutch Golden Age painter and art theorist (died 1711)
- September 22 – Titus van Rijn, son and model of Rembrandt (died 1668)
- date unknown
  - Johann Franz Ermels, German painter and engraver (died 1693)
  - Juan Conchillos Falco, Spanish painter (died 1711)
  - Thomas Heeremans, Dutch Golden Age painter (died 1694)
  - Pieter Peutemans, Dutch Golden Age painter (died 1698)
  - Pasquale Rossi, Italian painter (died 1718)
  - Antoinette Bouzonnet-Stella, French engraver (died 1676)
  - Tao Chi, Chinese landscape painter (died 1720)
  - Herman Verelst, Dutch Golden Age portrait and still life painter (died 1690)
  - Jan Pietersz Zomer, Dutch engraver, copyist, and art collector (died 1724)

== Deaths ==
- January 11 – Juan de Jáuregui, Spanish poet and painter (born 1583)
- April 16 – Domenichino (Domenico Zampieri), Italian Baroque painter (born 1581)
- June 27 – Michiel Jansz van Mierevelt, Dutch painter, born at Delft (born 1567)
- November – Andrés López Polanco, Spanish Baroque portrait painter (born unknown)
- December 9 – Sir Anthony van Dyck, Flemish Baroque painter who became the leading court painter in England (born 1599)
- date unknown
  - Juan Bautista de Espinosa, Spanish still life painter (born 1590)
  - Léonard Gaultier, French engraver (born 1561)
  - Lazzaro Tavarone, Genoese painter (born 1556)
  - Adam van Noort, Flemish painter and draughtsman (born 1561/1562)
  - Artus Wolffort, Flemish painter (born 1581)
- probable – Ottavio Viviani, Italian painter of quadratura (born 1579)
