= 1634 in art =

Events from the year 1634 in art.

== Events ==
- (unknown)

== Works ==
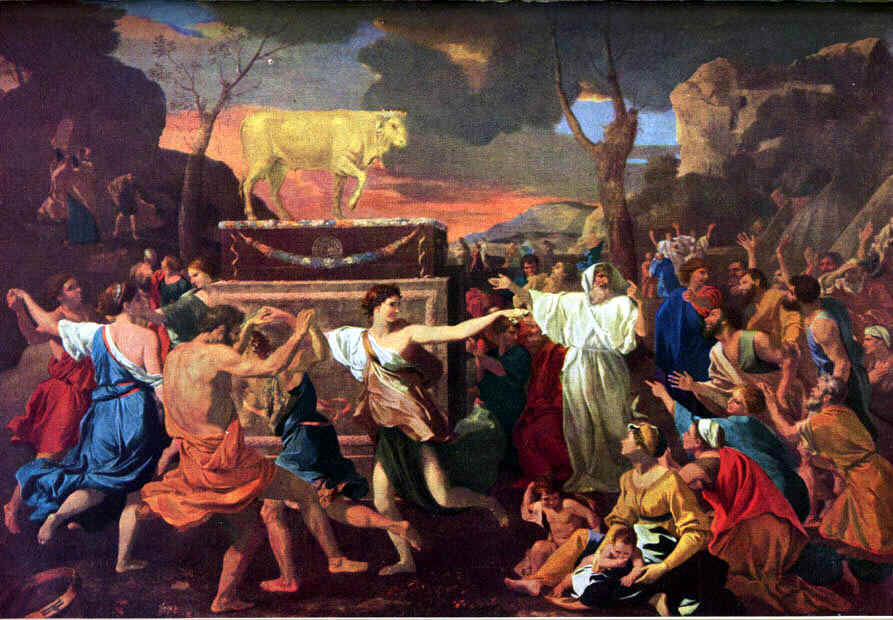
Poussin - The Adoration of the Golden Calf

- Claude Lorrain
  - Coast Scene with Europa and the Bull (Kimbell Art Museum, Fort Worth, Texas)
  - Goats (etching)
- Nicolas Poussin
  - The Adoration of the Golden Calf
  - The Crossing of the Red Sea
- Rembrandt
  - Artemisia
  - The Descent from the Cross

Deposition from the Cross

  - Deposition from the Cross
  - Diana Bathing with her Nymphs with Actaeon and Callisto
  - Flora
  - Joseph and Potiphar's Wife (etching)
  - Pendant portraits of Maerten Soolmans and Oopjen Coppit
- Peter Paul Rubens - The Adoration of the Magi (for Convent of the White Nuns, Leuven; now in King's College Chapel, Cambridge)
- Anthony van Dyck
  - Magistrates of Brussels (destroyed 1695)
  - Deposition (Alte Pinakothek)
  - Henri II de Lorraine, duc de Guise (approximate date; National Gallery of Art, Washington, D.C.)
- Diego Velázquez
  - Doña Antonia de Ipeñarrieta y Galdós and Her Son Don Luis
  - Equestrian Portrait of Margarita of Austria
  - Equestrian Portrait of the Count-Duke of Olivares

== Births ==
- January - Nicolaes Maes, Dutch painter of genre works and portraits (died 1693)
- February 5 - Dancker Danckerts, Dutch engraver and publisher (died 1666)
- October 18 - Luca Giordano, Italian painter and printmaker in etching (died 1705)
- date unknown
  - Philippe Caffieri, Italian decorative sculptor (died 1716)
  - Adam Colonia, Dutch painter working in England (died 1688)
  - Tommaso Costa, Italian painter (died 1690)
  - Francesco Ferrari, Italian painter and architect of the Baroque period (died 1708)
  - Ciro Ferri, Italian sculptor and painter (died 1689)
  - Giuseppe Ghezzi, Italian painter of the Baroque period, active mainly in Rome (died 1721)
  - Juan Simón Gutiérrez, Spanish Baroque painter (died 1718)
  - Jacob Levecq, Dutch Golden Age painter (died 1675)
  - Bartolomé Pérez, Spanish painter of flowers and still lifes (died 1693)
  - Francesco Pianta, Italian sculptor (died 1690)
  - Jan-Erasmus Quellinus, Flemish Baroque painter of large altarpieces and histories (died 1715)
  - Giuseppe Recco, Italian painter (died 1695)
  - Ludovico Trasi, Italian painter, born and active in Ascoli Piceno (died 1694)
  - Egbert van Heemskerck, Dutch painter, also known as Egbert van Heemskerck the Elder (died 1704)
- probable - Eglon van der Neer, Dutch painter of portraits and elegant, fashionable people, and later of landscapes (died 1703)

== Deaths ==
- May
  - Hendrick Avercamp, painter (born 1585)
  - Hans Krumpper, sculptor and plasterer (born 1570)
- November 23 - Wenceslas Cobergher, Flemish Renaissance architect, engineer, painter, antiquarian, numismatist and economist (born 1560)
- December 15 - Eugenio Caxés, Spanish painter (born 1577)
- date unknown
  - Benedetto Bandiera, Italian painter (born 1557/1560)
  - Johan Bara, Dutch painter, designer and engraver (born 1581)
  - Ippolito Buzzi, Italian sculptor (born 1562)
  - Cornelis Danckerts de Ry, Dutch architect and sculptor (born 1561)
  - Epiphanius Evesham, British sculptor (born 1570)
  - Johann Matthias Kager, German painter (born 1566)
  - Johannes Moreelse, Dutch painter (born 1603)
  - Juan Zariñena, Spanish painter (born 1545)
