= 1693 in art =

Events from the year 1693 in art.

== Events ==
- January 11 – A massive earthquake in Sicily leads indirectly to the development of a Sicilian Baroque style of architecture and decoration as palazzi, public buildings, cathedrals and churches require reconstruction.

== Paintings ==
Wang Hui, A Thousand Peaks and Myriad Ravines, 1693

- Wang Hui – A Thousand Peaks and Myriad Ravines
- Godfrey Kneller – Portrait of Hortense Mancini
- Hyacinthe Rigaud – Portrait of Crown Prince Frederick of Denmark
- Jan Wyck – The Battle of the Boyne (approximate date)

== Births ==
- May 31 – Bartolomeo Nazari, Italian portraitist (died 1758)
- date unknown
  - Placido Campolo, Italian painter of the late-Baroque period (died 1743)
  - Georg Rafael Donner, Austrian sculptor (died 1741)
  - Zheng Xie, Chinese painter of orchids, bamboo, and stones; one of the Eight Eccentrics of Yangzhou (died 1765)
- probable – Bernardino Ludovisi, Italian sculptor (died 1749)

== Deaths ==
- April 20 – Claudio Coello, Spanish Baroque painter (born 1642)
- July 31 – Willem Kalf, Dutch painter (born 1619)
- November – Nicolaes Maes, Dutch Baroque painter of genre works and portraits (born 1634)
- November 12 – Maria van Oosterwijck, Dutch Baroque painter, specializing in richly detailed still-lifes (born 1630)
- December 13 – Willem van de Velde the Elder, Dutch painter (born 1611)
- date unknown
  - Johann Franz Ermels, German painter and engraver (born 1641)
  - Dirck Ferreris, Dutch Golden Age painter (born 1639)
  - Hendrik Graauw, Dutch Golden Age painter (born 1627)
  - Bartolomé Pérez, Spanish painter of flowers and still lifes (born 1634)
  - Giovan Battista Ruoppolo, Neapolitan painter, notable for still-lifes (born 1629)
  - Johann Weikhard von Valvasor, Carniolan nobleman, scientist, writer, draughtsman, and polymath (born 1641)
