= Joseph and Potiphar's Wife =

Joseph and Potiphar's Wife may refer to a number of works based on the story told in Book of Genesis chapter 39:

- Joseph and Potiphar's Wife (Properzia de' Rossi), a 1520s marble sculpture by Properzia de' Rossi
- Joseph and Potiphar's Wife (Tintoretto) - 1555 painting by Tintoretto
- Joseph and Potiphar's Wife (Finoglia) - 1620-1623 (or possibly c.1640) painting by Italian artist Paolo Finoglia
- Joseph and Potiphar's Wife (Murillo) - 1640–1645 oil on canvas painting by the Spanish artist Murillo
- Joseph and Potiphar's Wife (Orazio Gentileschi) - c.1630-1632 painting by the Italian artist Orazio Gentileschi
- Joseph and Potiphar's Wife (etching) - 1634 etching by the Dutch artist Rembrandt
- Joseph and Potiphar's Wife (van Mieris) - 1691 painting by Willem van Mieris (Wallace collection)
- Joseph and Potiphar's Wife (Guido Reni) - a series of paintings by Guido Reni. The one painted in 1625–1626 is in The Fitzwilliam Museum (Cambridge, UK). The version painted in c.1630 is currently in Getty Center (Los Angeles, US), and the third version (1631) is in Pushkin Museum of Fine Arts (Moscow, Russia).
