= 1627 in art =

Events from the year 1627 in art.

== Events ==
- January 25 - Dutch painter Johannes van der Beeck is found guilty of "blasphemy against God and avowed atheism, at the same time as leading a frightful and pernicious lifestyle."
- The Fontana della Barcaccia in Rome is engineered by Gian Lorenzo Bernini with help from his father.

== Works ==
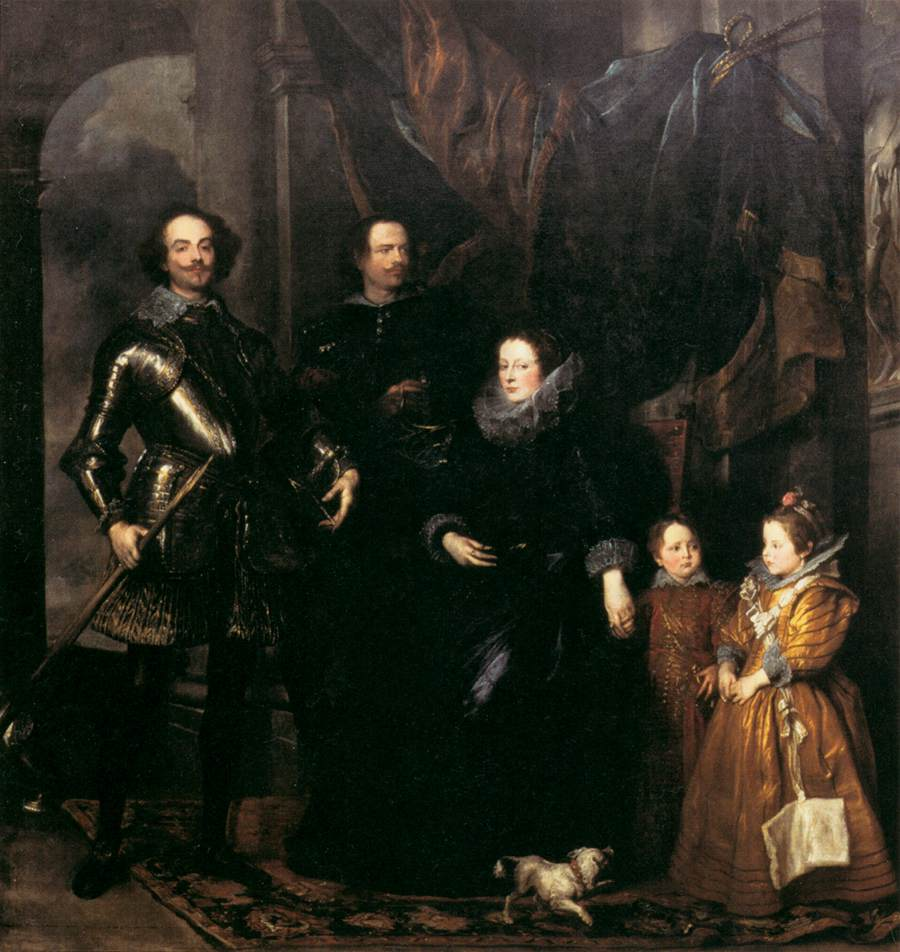
van Dyck – The Lomellini Family, Scottish National Gallery

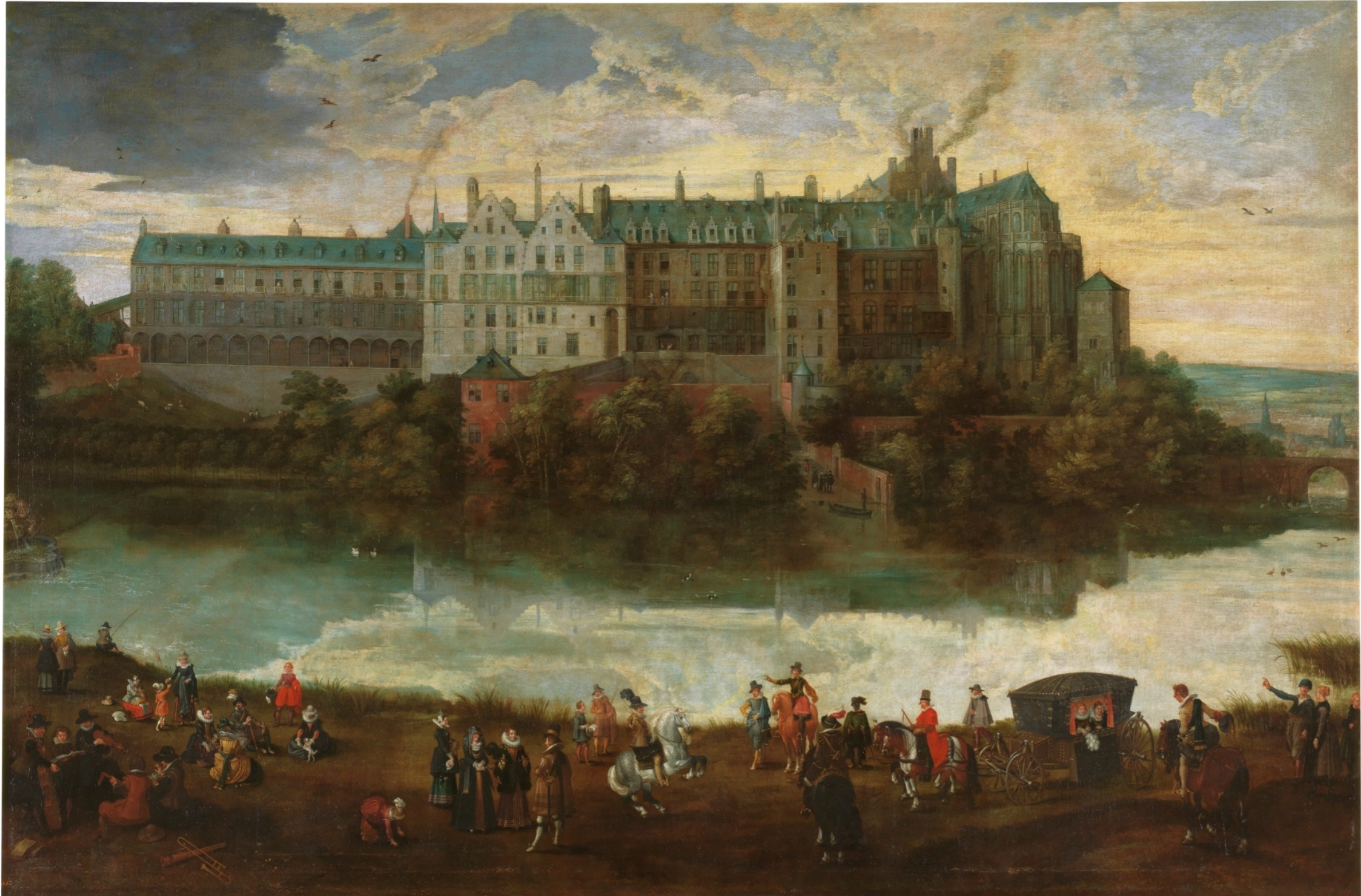
Sebastiaen Vrancx, The Royal Palace in Brussels, c. 1627, Museo del Prado

- Rembrandt
  - The Flight into Egypt (Rembrandt) (painting)
  - The Gold Weigher
  - St. Paul in Prison
- Francisco Ribalta – Christ Embracing St. Bernard (1625-7)
- Peter Paul Rubens – Albert and Nicolaas Rubens
- Anthony van Dyck – The Lomellini Family (1626-7)
- Sebastiaen Vrancx – The Royal Palace in Brussels (c. 1627)
- Adam Willaerts – Ships on a Dutch roadstead

== Births ==
- May 16 – Willem van Aelst, Dutch artist (died 1683)
- August 2 – Samuel Dirksz van Hoogstraten (died 1678)
- date unknown
  - Francisco Caro, Spanish Baroque painter (died 1667)
  - Alexander Coosemans, Flemish Baroque still-life painter (died 1689)
  - Josse de Corte, French sculptor (died 1679)
  - Philip Fruytiers, Flemish painter (died 1666)
  - Onorio Marinari, Italian painter (died 1715)
  - Jan Siberechts, Flemish painter (died 1703)
  - Domenico Piola, Genoese painter (died 1703)
  - Matthias Withoos, Dutch painter of still lifes and city scenes (died 1703)
  - Ippolito Galantini – Italian painter and monk (died 1706)
- probable
  - Jan de Bray, Dutch painter (died 1697)
  - Hendrik Graauw, Dutch Golden Age painter (died 1693)
  - Jan Thopas, Dutch portraitist (died c.1695)

== Deaths ==
- March - Ippolito Borghese, Italian painter (born unknown)
- March 10 - Giovanni Battista Paggi, Italian painter (born 1554)
- May 3 - Francesco Zucco, Italian painter (born 1570)
- May 20 - Giovanni Paolo Cavagna, Italian painter (born 1556)
- June - Sir Nathaniel Bacon, painter of kitchen and market scenes with large vegetables, fruit, and buxom maids (born 1585)
- August 5 - Aart Jansz Druyvesteyn, Dutch Golden Age painter (born 1577)
- August 27 - Francesco Maria del Monte, Italian Cardinal and arts patron (Caravaggio) (born 1549)
- date unknown
  - Piermaria Bagnadore, Italian painter and architect (born 1556)
  - Tiberio di Tito, Italian painter of portraits, including small pencil portraits (born 1573)
  - Bartolomé González y Serrano, Spanish Baroque portrait painter (born 1564)
  - Jacopo Ligozzi, Italian painter, illustrator, designer, and miniaturist of the late Renaissance and early Mannerist styles (born 1547)
  - Juan de Mesa, Spanish sculptor (born 1583)
  - Adam van Vianen, Dutch Golden Age medallist, engraver and silversmith (born 1568)
  - 1627/1632: Rafael Sadeler II, Flemish engraver of the Sadeler family (born 1584)
