= Holsman =

Holsman may refer to:

== People ==
- Hans Holsman (1610 – 1652), a German Baroque painter
- Henry K. Holsman (1866–1963), American architect and car manufacturer
- Jason Holsman (born 1976), American politician

== Other ==
- Holsman Automobile Company, early American high wheeler automobile
