= Flora (Rembrandt, Hermitage) =

1634 painting by Rembrandt van Rijn

- Saskia as Flora
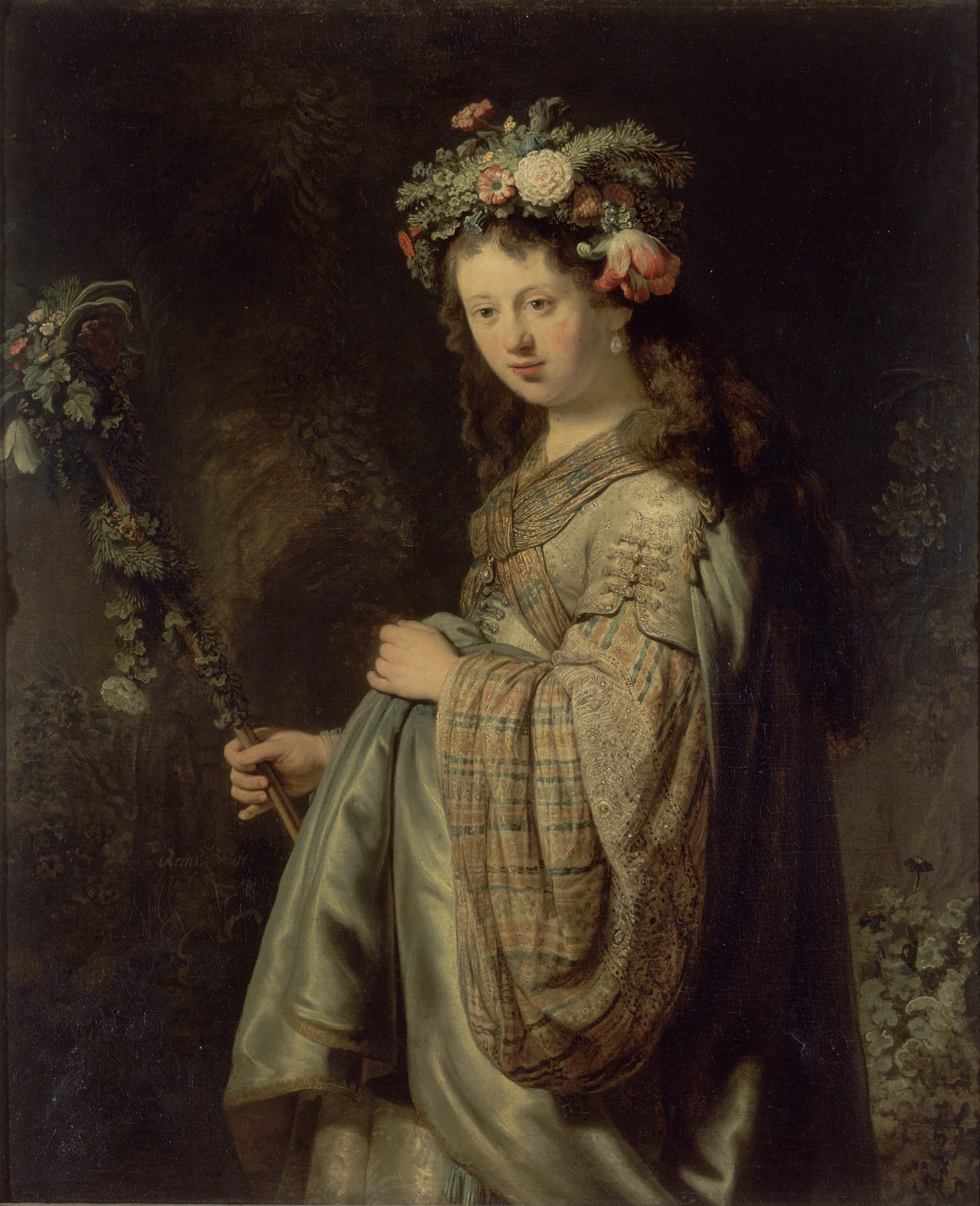
- Artist: Rembrandt
- Year: 1634
- Medium: oil paint, canvas
- Dimensions: 125 cm (49 in) × 101 cm (40 in)
- Location: Hermitage hall 254 - Rembrandt hall

Flora or Saskia as Flora (Bode 336; Dut. 267; Wb. 412; B.-HdG. 189) is a 1634 oil-on-canvas painting by Rembrandt, depicting his wife Saskia van Uylenburgh as the goddess Flora. It is held by the Hermitage Museum in St. Petersburg.

== Description ==
The life-size quarter-length work was painted in Amsterdam, during a period when the young artist was experiencing early success. He married Saskia in June 1634, and he made several paintings of her in the guise of characters from ancient myth, similar to his other character portraits (tronies). This work is thought to depict Saskia as Flora, Roman goddess of spring and flowers. She is standing in a grotto, looking towards the viewer, swathed in an extravagant and exotic costume of silk and satin with silver embroidery, with long hanging sleeves and a blue mantle, and wears a large pearl earring. She has a floral headdress over her long hair, including a multicoloured "broken" tulip. She is also carrying a staff also decorated with leaves and flowers.

The painting measures 125 cm × 101 cm (49 in × 40 in). It is signed and dated below Flora's right hand, "Rembrandt f (...) 34".

Rembrandt's paintings of Flora may have drawn some inspiration from the painting of Flora by Titian, then held in the collection of Alfonso Lopez, the Spanish ambassador in Amsterdam. A different composition of Saskia as Flora (1635) is held by the National Gallery, London, now known as Saskia van Uylenburgh in Arcadian Costume, and a painting of Saskia with a Red Flower (1641) is in the Gemäldegalerie Alte Meister, Staatliche Kunstsammlungen Dresden. After Saskia's death in 1642, a 1654 painting depicts Hendrickje Stoffels as Flora, now held by the Metropolitan Museum of Art, although the facial features of the subject also resemble Saskia

Rembrandt also painted Saskia as other female figures from ancient myth, including Bellona (1633, Metropolitan Museum of Art) and Minerva (1635, The Leiden Collection of Thomas Kaplan and Daphne Recanati Kaplan).

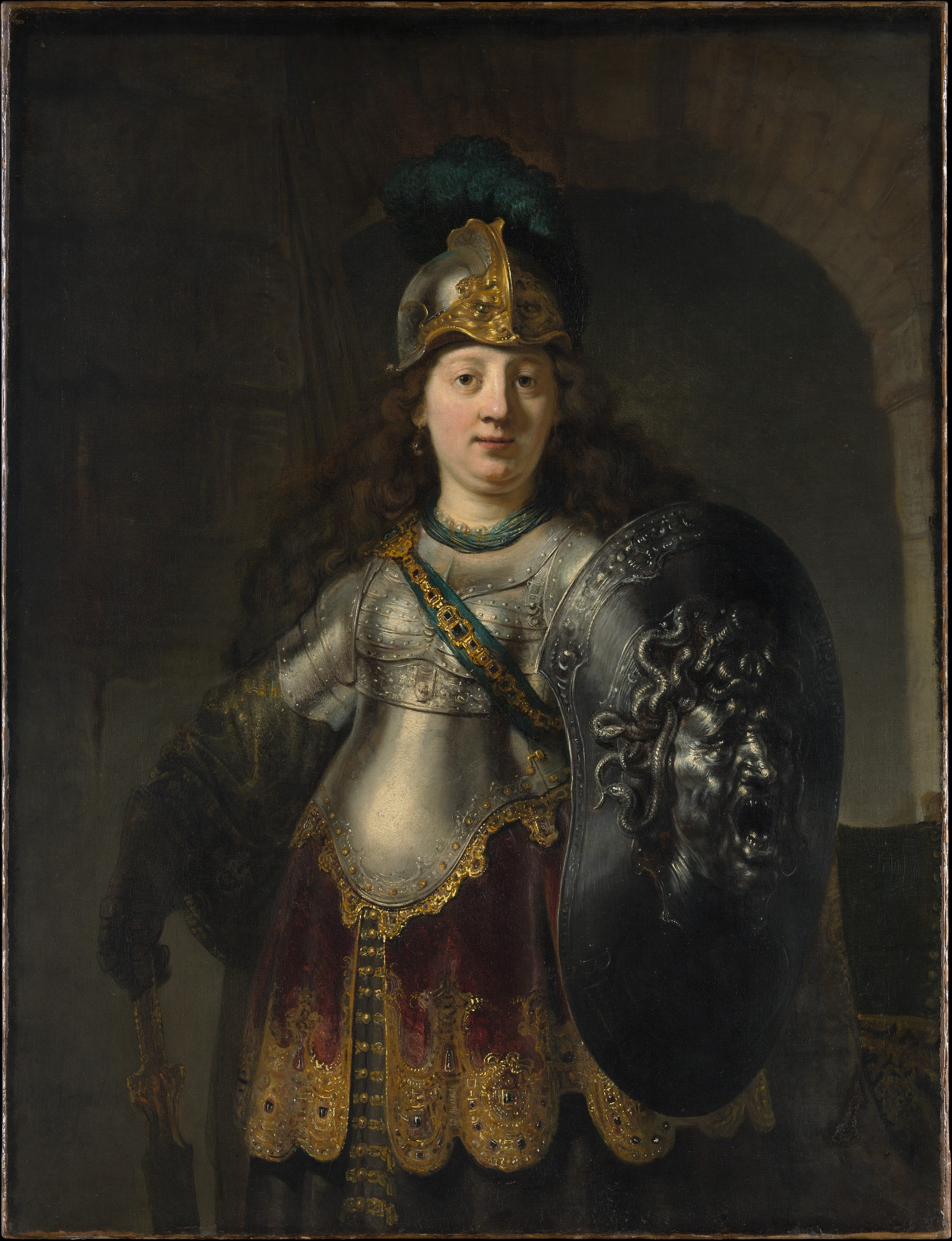
Bellona, 1633, Metropolitan Museum of Art

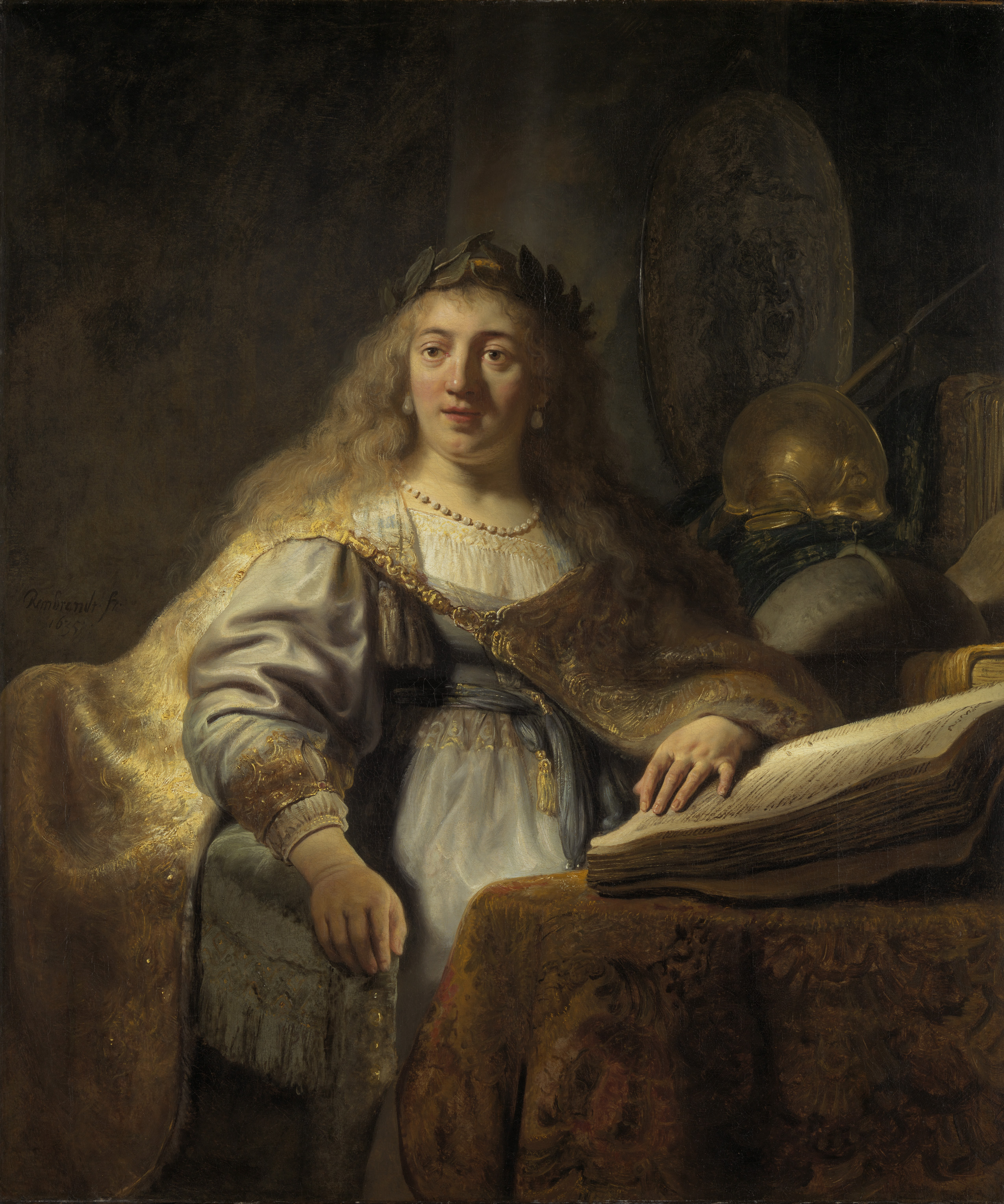
Minerva, 1635, The Leiden Collection

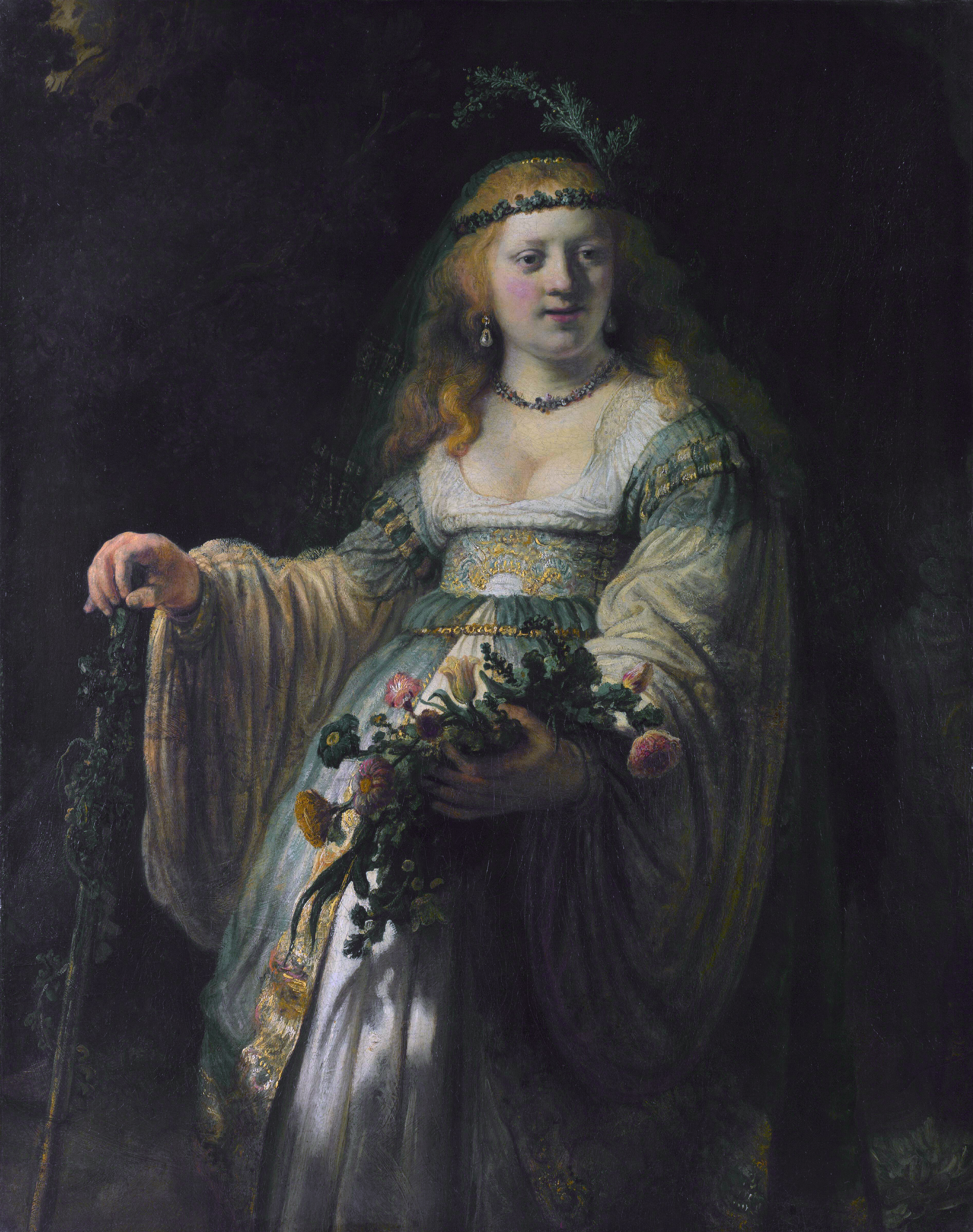
Saskia van Uylenburgh in Arcadian Costume, 1635, National Gallery, London

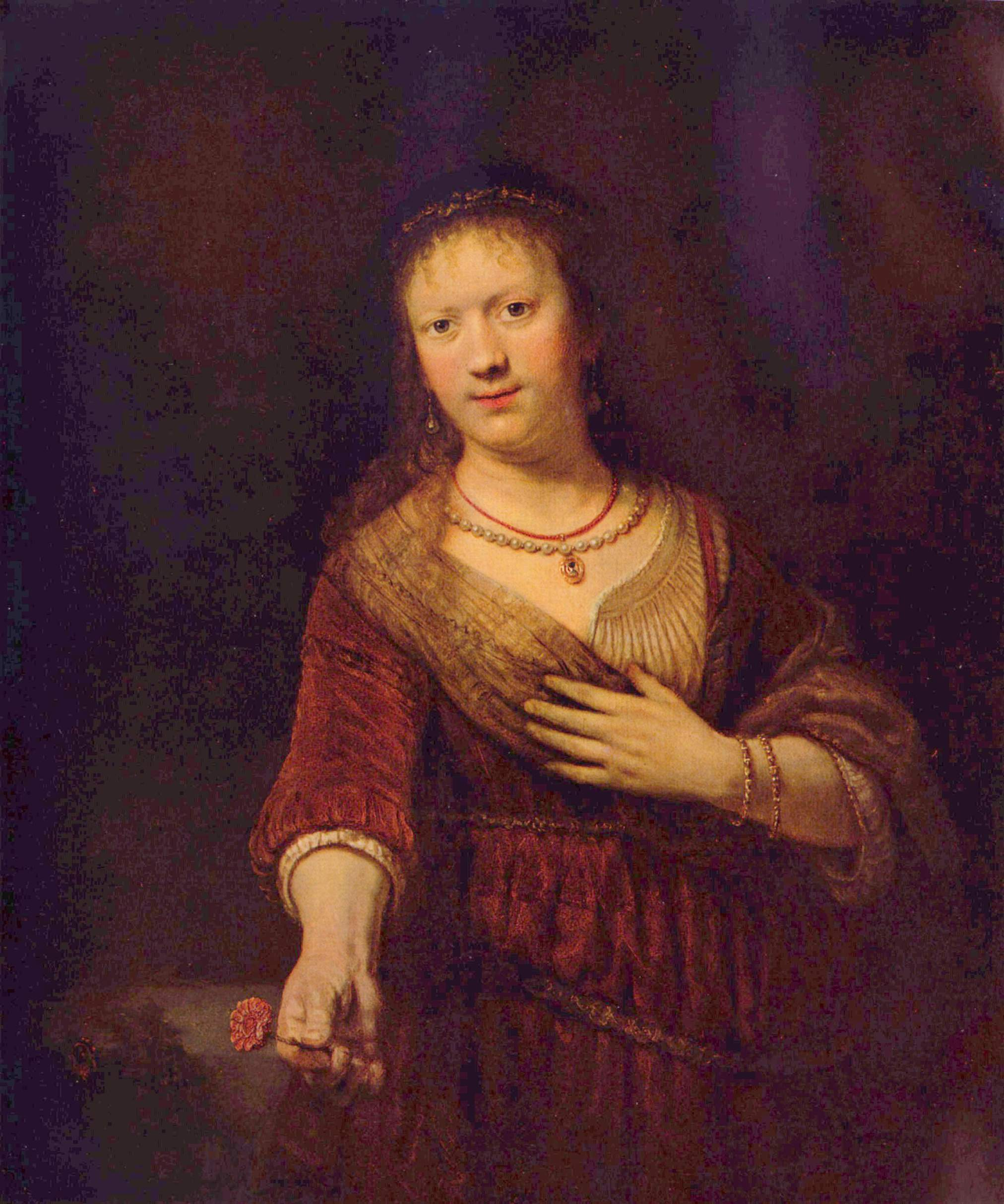
Saskia with a Red Flower (aka Saskia as Flora), 1641, Staatliche Kunstsammlungen Dresden

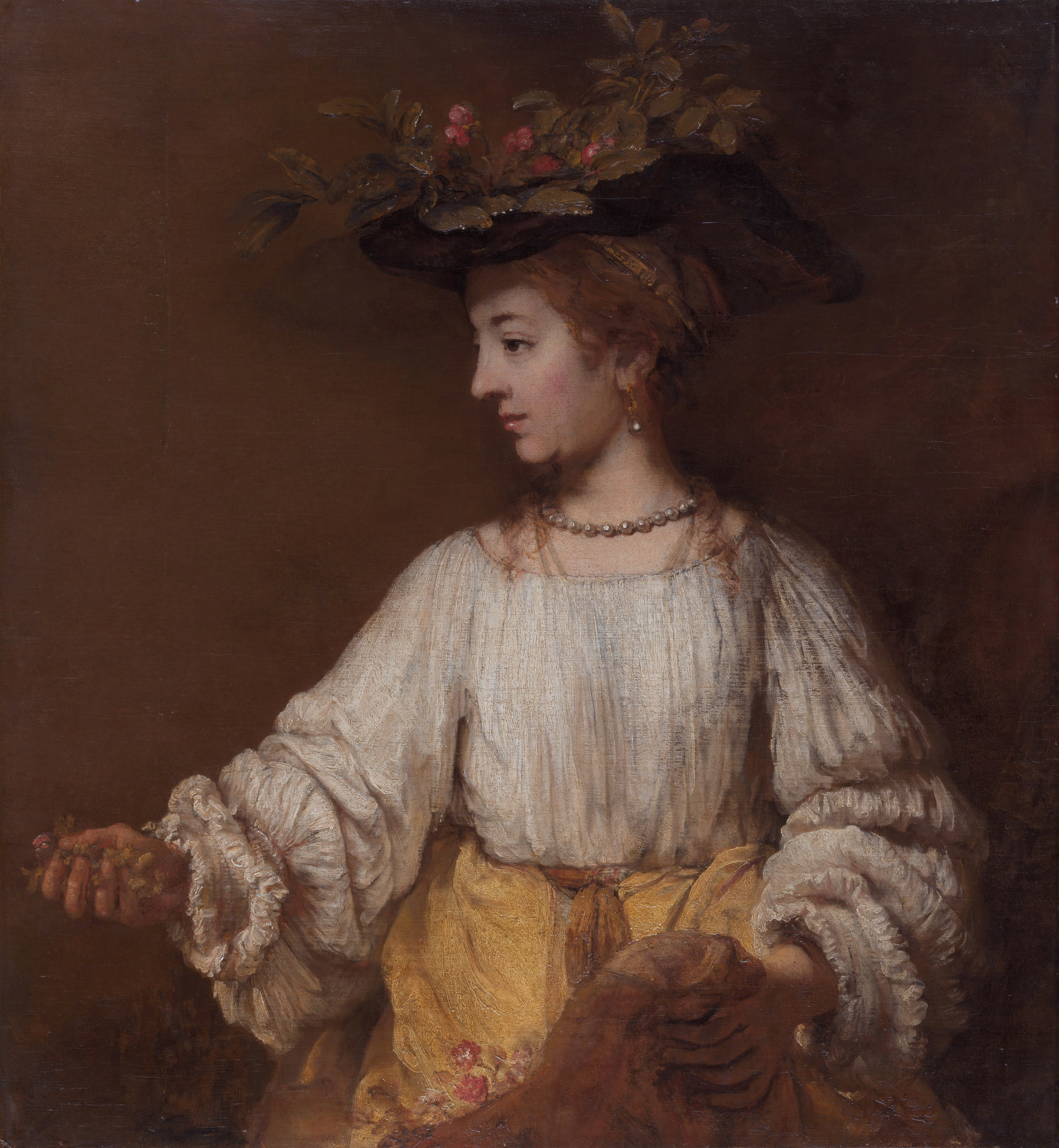
Flora, 1654, Metropolitan Museum of Art

== Provenance ==
The early provenance of the painting is not clear. It was put up for sale in Amsterdam in 1770 from the estate of Herman Aarentz, who was a bailiff and councillor (rentmeester and gemeensman) in Deventer. It was "bought in" by the auction house for 2600 florins, and later acquired by Catherine II, Empress of Russia. It entered the Russian imperial collection at the Hermitage in St Petersburg before 1774, and it remains in the collection at the Hermitage. In 2017 it was loaned to the Hermitage branch in Amsterdam for some months.

It was catalogued by Cornelis Hofstede de Groot in 1915, who recorded that it was sometimes wrongly called The Jewish Bride.

== See also ==
- List of paintings by Rembrandt
