= Joseph and Potiphar's Wife (Tintoretto) =

Painting by Tintoretto

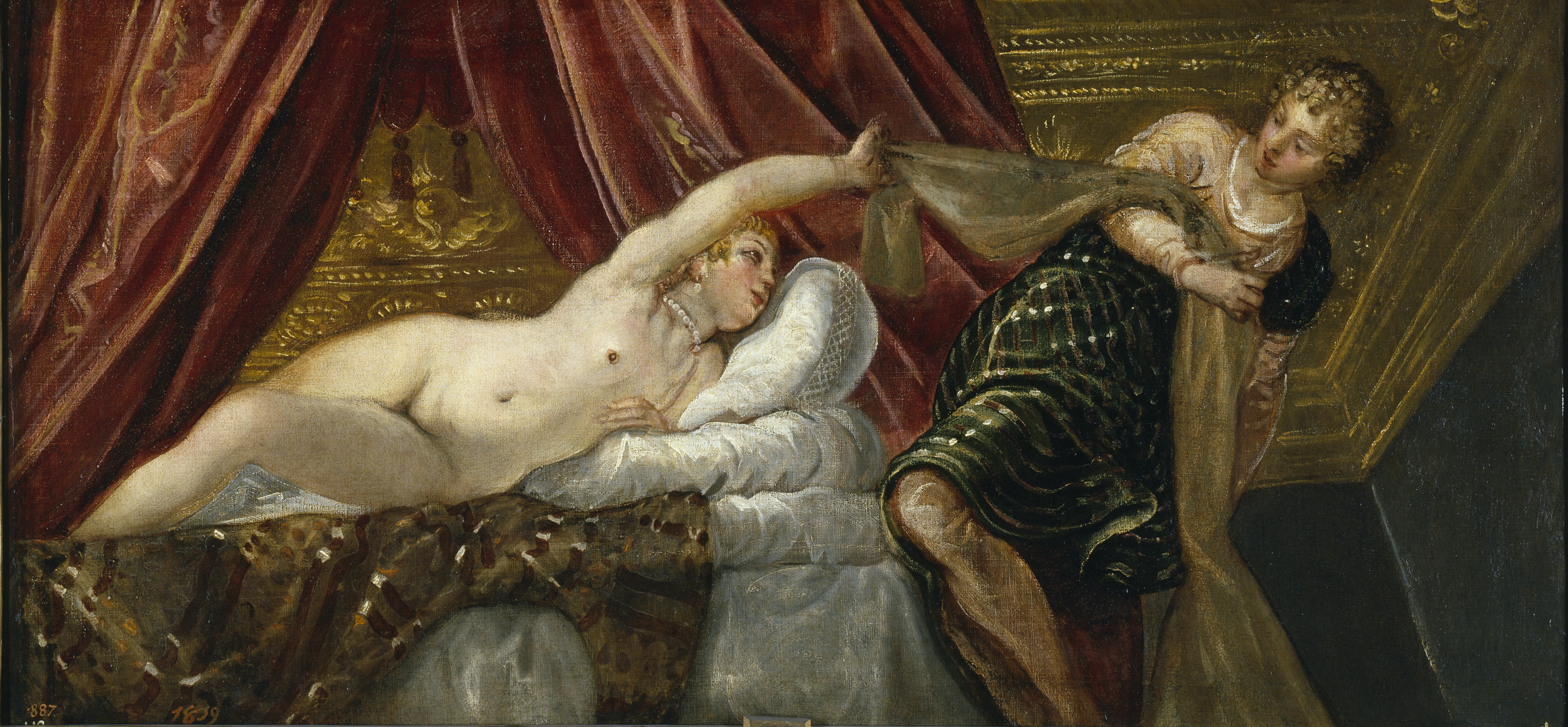
Joseph and Potiphar's Wife (c. 1555) by Tintoretto

Joseph and Potiphar's Wife is a c. 1555 oil on canvas painting by Jacopo Tintoretto, now in the Museo del Prado, in Madrid. The story of Joseph and Potiphar's wife is from the Old Testament (Genesis 39:1–23).

It was bought with five other biblical paintings for Philip IV of Spain by Diego Velázquez during his second visit to Venice. The viewpoint suggests that it could have adorned a ceiling. It is now in the Museo del Prado in Madrid.

== See also ==
- Joseph and Potiphar's Wife (disambiguation)
