= The Jewish Bride =

Painting by Rembrandt (c. 1665–1669)

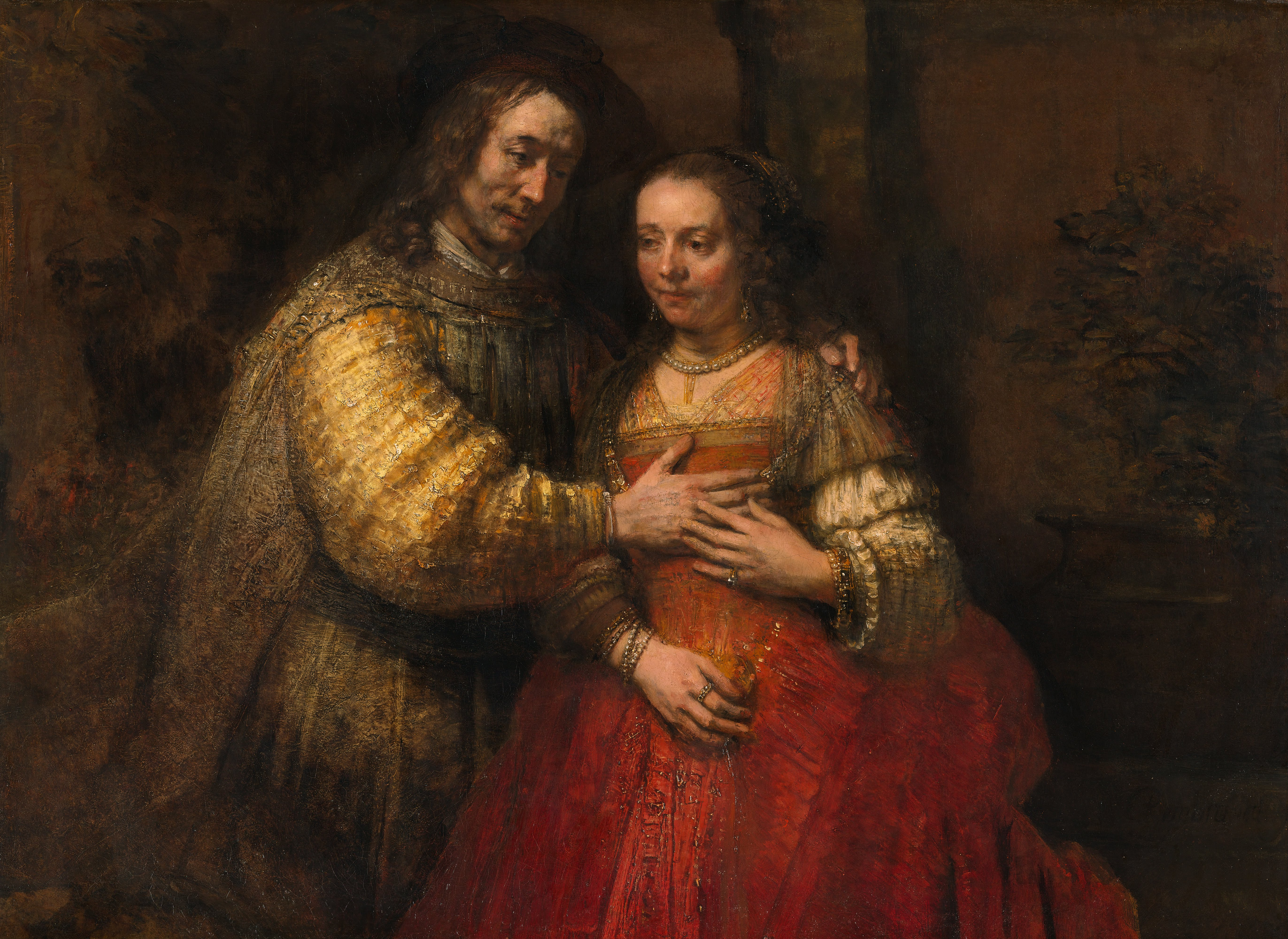
- Artist: Rembrandt
- Year: c. 1665–1669
- Medium: Oil on canvas
- Movement: Baroque painting, Dutch Golden Age painting
- Dimensions: 121.5 cm × 166.5 cm (47.8 in × 65.6 in)
- Location: Rijksmuseum, Amsterdam

The Jewish Bride (Dutch: Het Joodse bruidje) is a painting by Rembrandt, painted around 1665‒1669.

The painting gained its current name in the early 19th century, when an Amsterdam art collector identified the subject as that of a Jewish father bestowing a necklace upon his daughter on her wedding day. This interpretation is no longer accepted, and the identity of the couple is uncertain. The ambiguity is heightened by the lack of anecdotal context, leaving only the central universal theme, that of a couple joined in love. Speculative suggestions as to the couple's identity have ranged from Rembrandt's son Titus and his bride, or Amsterdam poet Miguel de Barrios and his wife. Also considered are several couples from the Old Testament, including Abraham and Sarah, Boaz and Ruth, or Isaac and Rebekah, which is supported by a drawing by the artist several years prior.

While technical evidence suggests that Rembrandt initially envisioned a larger and more elaborate composition, the placement of his signature at lower left indicates that its current dimensions are not significantly different from those at the time of its completion. According to Rembrandt biographer Christopher White, the completed composition is "one of the greatest expressions of the tender fusion of spiritual and physical love in the history of painting."

The painting is in the permanent collection of the Rijksmuseum in Amsterdam.

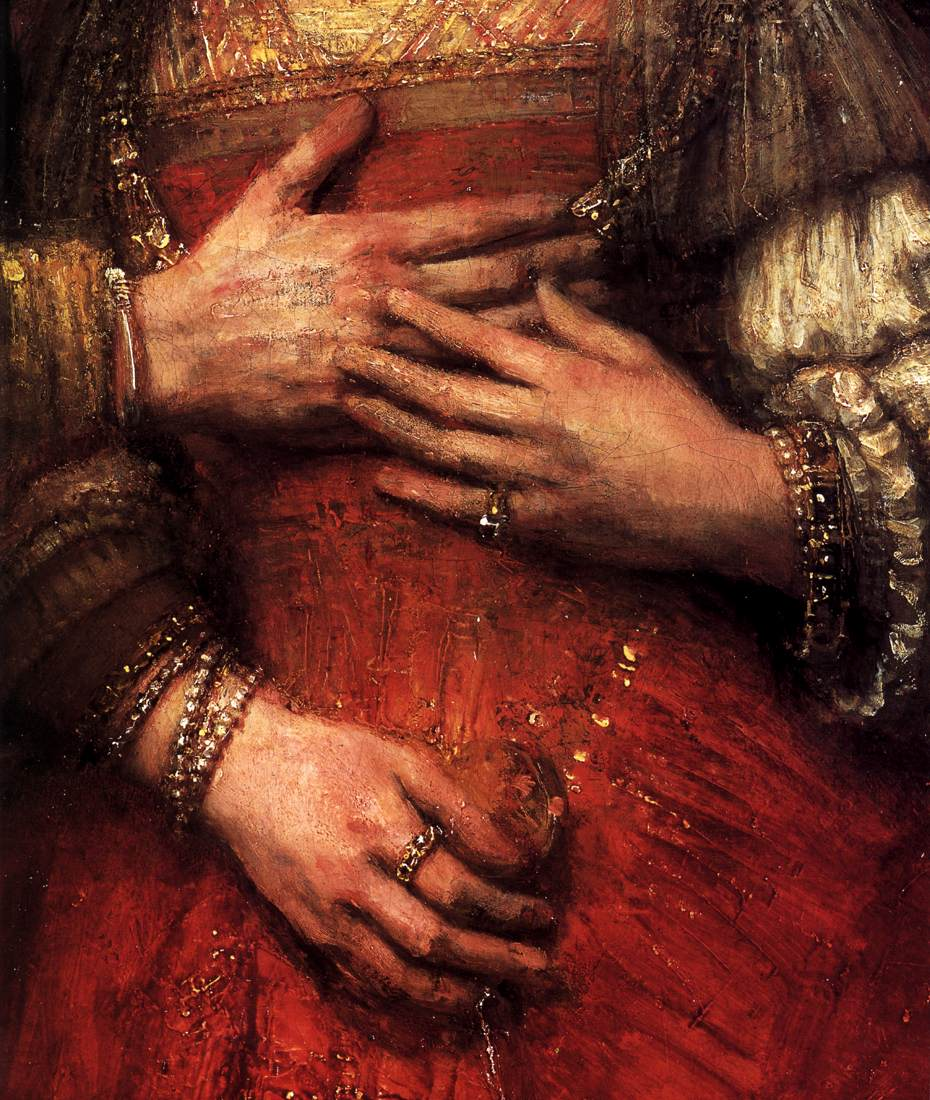
Detail of the hands

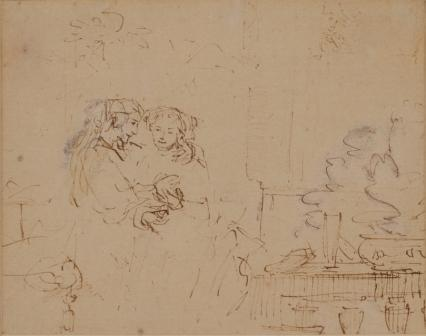
Drawing of Isaac and Rebeccah spied upon by Abimelech, by Rembrandt, c. 1662

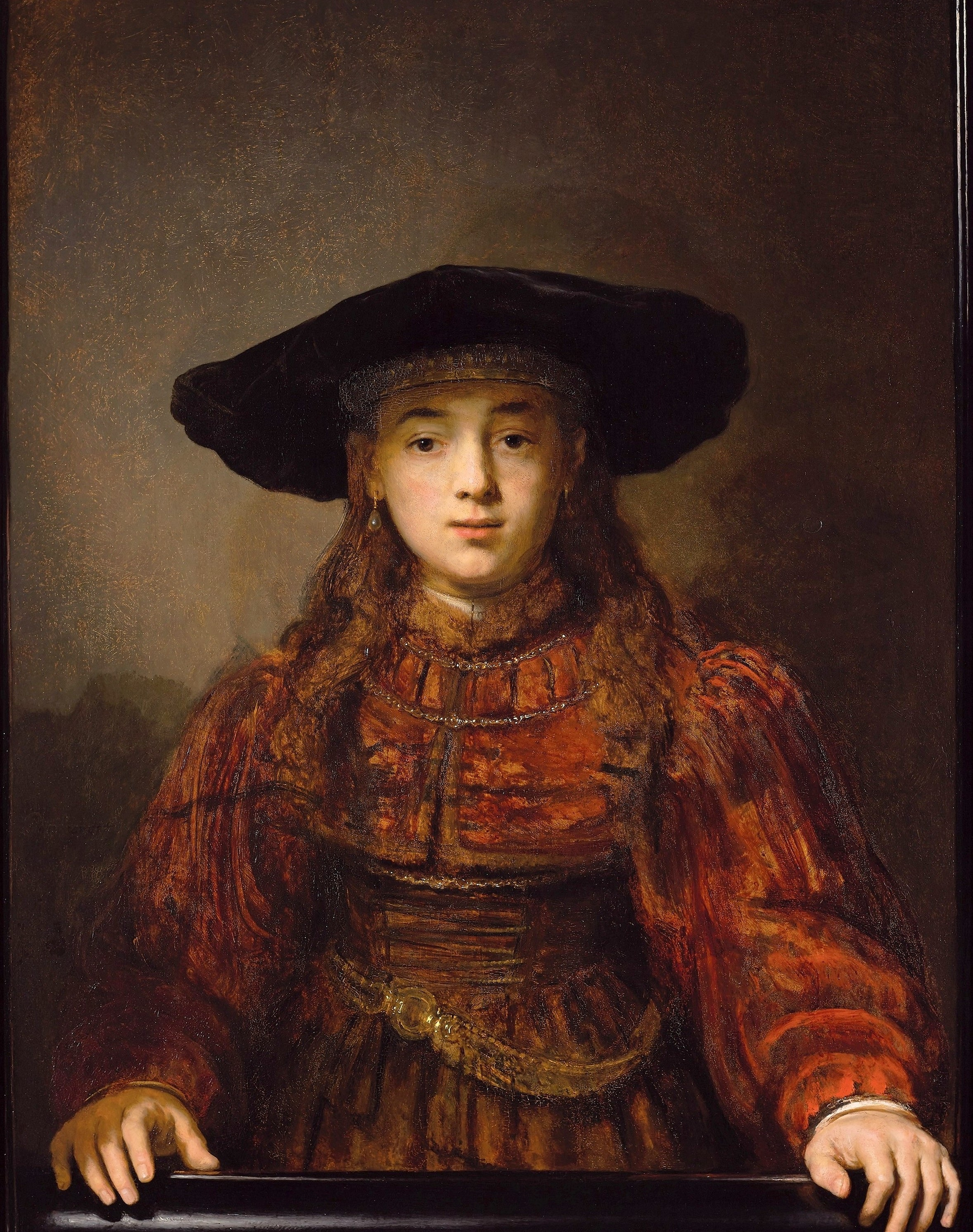
Other Jewish Bride, by Rembrandt, 1641

== See also ==
- List of paintings by Rembrandt
- 100 Great Paintings, 1980 BBC series
