= Landscape with the Good Samaritan =

1638 painting by Rembrandt

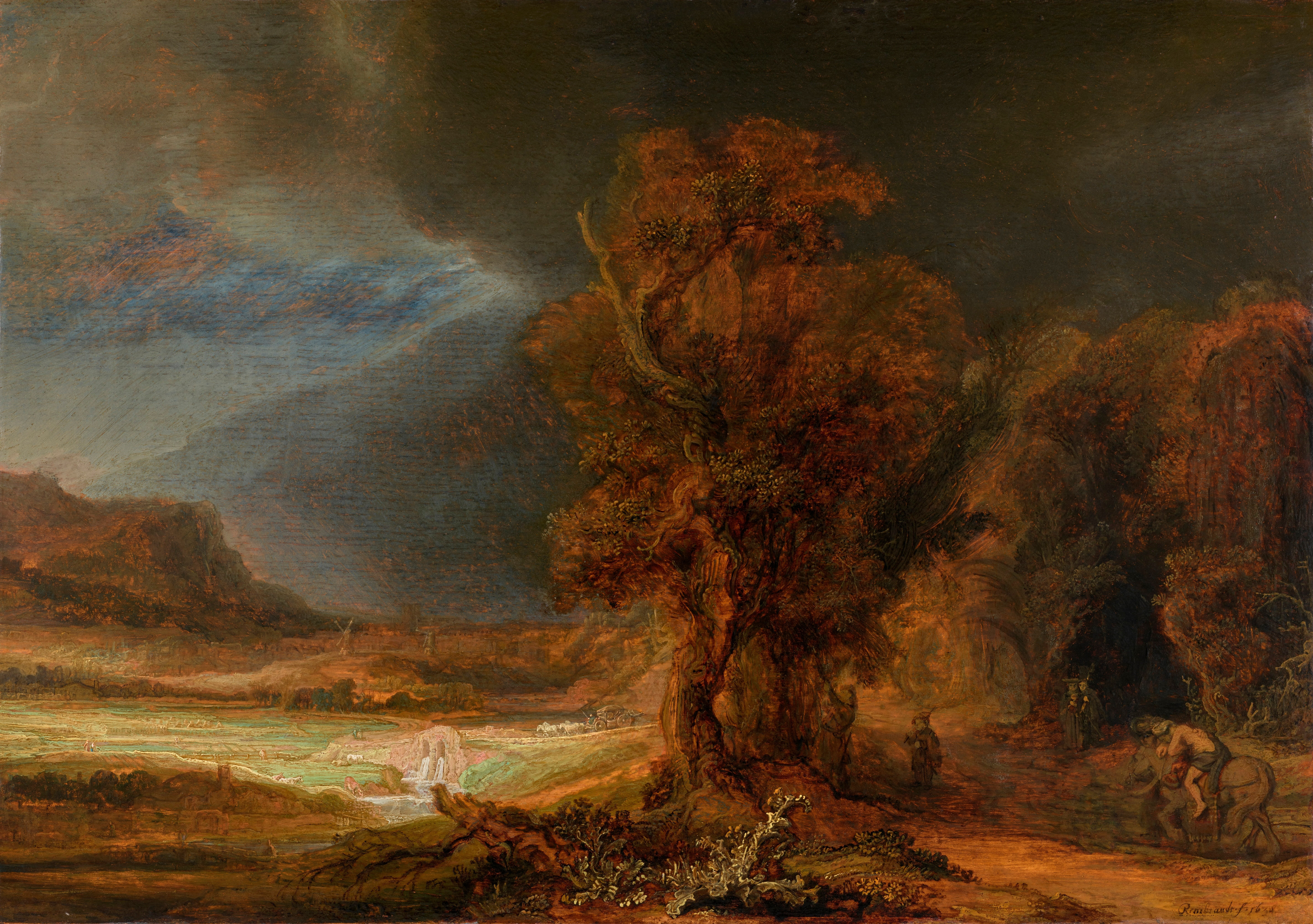
- Artist: Rembrandt
- Year: 1638
- Medium: Oil on oak panel
- Dimensions: 46.2 cm × 65.5 cm (18.1 in × 25.7 in)
- Location: Czartoryski Museum; Kraków, Poland

Landscape with the Good Samaritan is a 1638 oil-on-oak-panel painting by Rembrandt. It is one of only six oil landscapes by the artist, and it is also one of only three Rembrandt paintings in Polish collections; the other two are The Girl in a Picture Frame and The Scholar at the Lectern. It illustrates the parable of the Good Samaritan from the Gospel of Luke.

It was bought at a Paris auction by Jean-Pierre Norblin de La Gourdaine and therefore passed into the Polish noblewoman Izabela Czartoryska's collection at the Dom Gotycki at Puławy. That collection was later moved to Kraków, and so it was one of several paintings looted by the Germans in 1939. After World War Two, thanks to research by the art historian Karol Estreicher, it was returned to Kraków and is now in the city's Czartoryski Museum.

== See also ==
- List of paintings by Rembrandt

== Sources ==
- http://archiv.ub.uni-heidelberg.de/artdok/volltexte/2010/1423/
- Muzeum Czartoryskich. Historia i zbiory. Kraków 1998.
- Painting description by the Royal Łazienki Museum
- Painting description by codart.nl
