= The Girl in a Picture Frame =

1641 painting by Rembrandt van Rijn

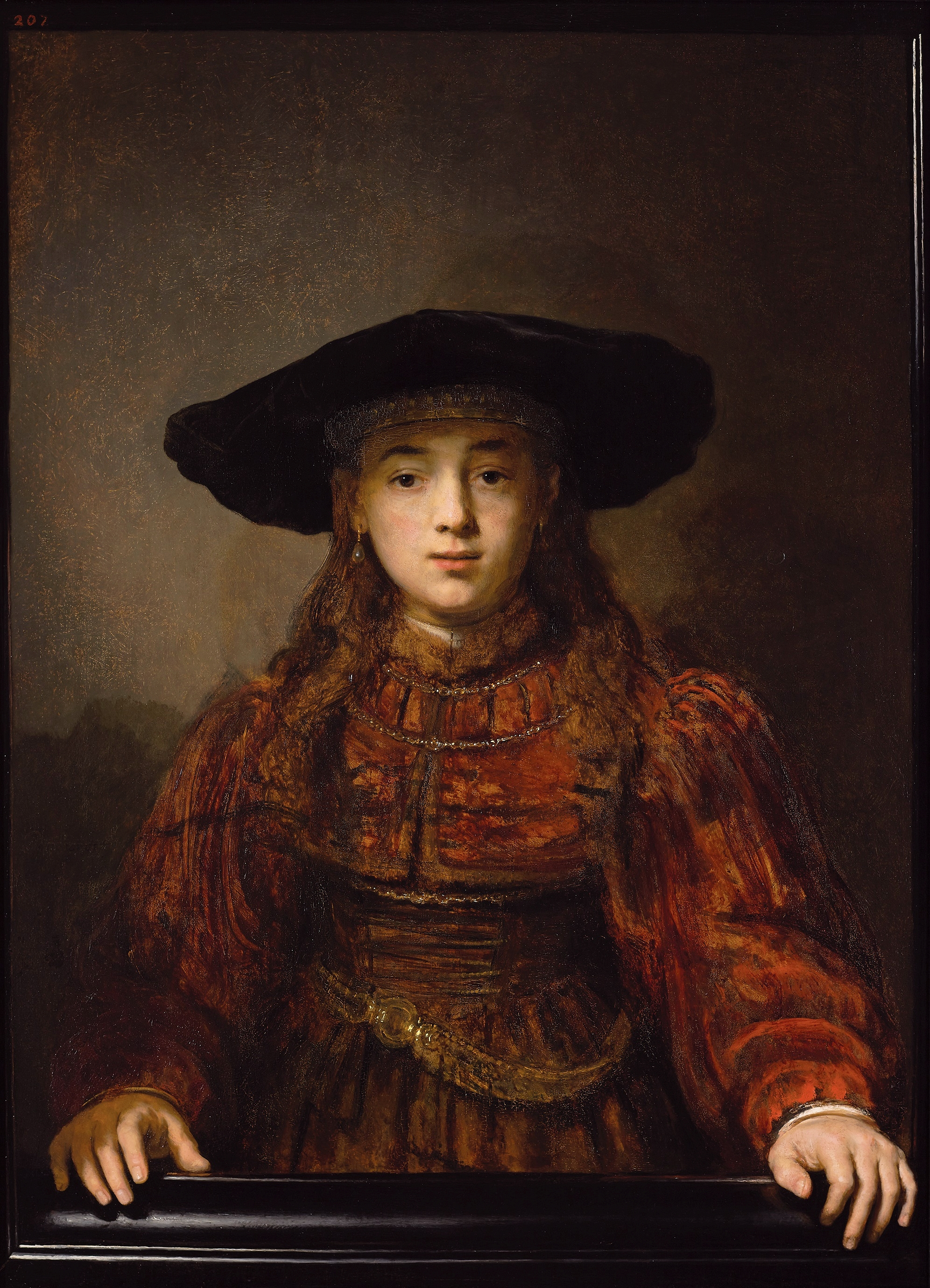
- Artist: Rembrandt Harmenszoon van Rĳn
- Year: 1641
- Medium: Oil on panel
- Dimensions: 105.5 cm × 76 cm (41.5 in × 29.9 in)
- Location: Royal Castle; Warsaw, Poland

The Girl in a Picture Frame is a 1641 oil on panel painting by the Dutch artist Rembrandt. It is also known as The Jewish Bride and The Girl in a Hat. With The Scholar at the Lectern and Landscape with the Good Samaritan, it is one of three Rembrandt paintings in Polish collections. It is now in the Royal Castle in Warsaw.

Its authorship has sometimes been questioned, but was confirmed as an authentic Rembrandt work in 2006.

== Description ==
The sitter is framed by a feigned picture frame of which only the bottom and right side are visible. She wears a dark red, velvet dress, a black hat and pear-shaped pearl earrings. This type of costume is not associated with the fashion of the time. When it appeared in portraits, it was treated as ancient attire that suited well the mythical, historical, oriental or biblical subjects. Rembrandt often portrayed figures dressed in this manner both in his oil paintings and etchings.

It is not a portrait, but a tronie or a study of a head or half-figure without any significant attributes or action. Rembrandt originally began to paint a different picture — of a woman seated, turned slightly to the left, wearing a dress corresponding to the fashion of the time, with a millstone ruff, and wearing a small bonnet. The figure was further to the right than the girl in the final version. The portrait of the woman in a bonnet was never completed and the panel was reused. Rembrandt was never known to have reused the support of a started painting for executing a portrait commissioned by a client.

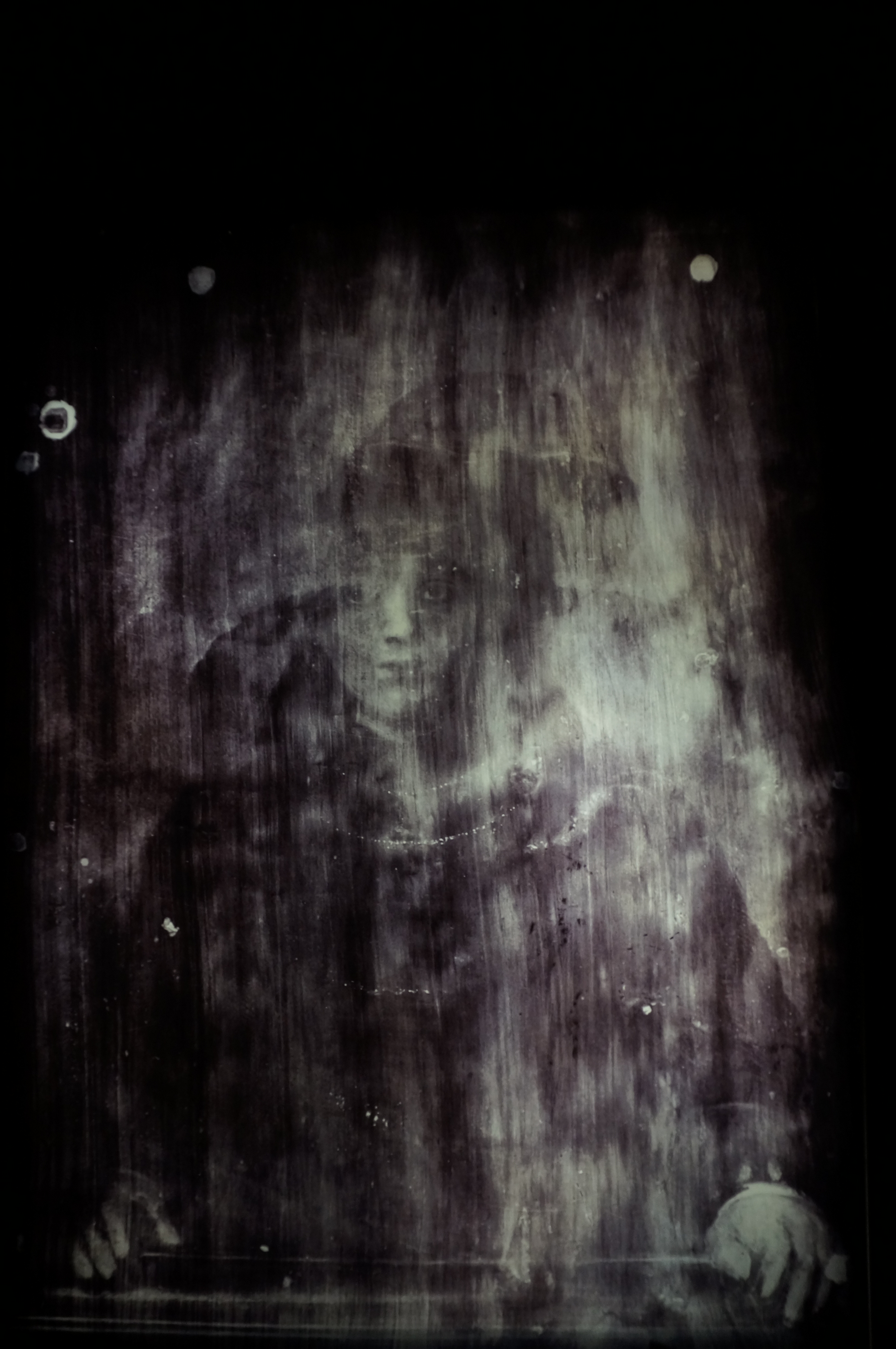
Traces of the original composition were detected by x-radiation before the restoration work.

The picture underwent restoration at the Conservation Department of the Royal Castle, Warsaw (between May 2005 and March 2006). The overpainting was removed and where removal was impossible, due to the damage to the original paint layer, it was minimized. Traces of the original composition were detected by x-radiation before the restoration work. The original brushwork, prominent in the texture of the painting, became visible on the chest and the right sleeve once the overpainted fragments were removed.

== History and provenance ==
King Stanisław August Poniatowski bought it and The Scholar at the Lectern in 1777 from Elisabeth Henriette Marie Golovkin (daughter of Count Friedrich Paul von Kameke) via the art dealer Jakub Triebl. He initially displayed them at the Łazienki Palace in Warsaw and after his death they both passed to Józef Poniatowski who in 1813 left them to his sister Maria Teresa Poniatowska. In 1815 they were bought by Kazimierz Rzewuski, who gave them to his daughter Ludwika, wife of Antoni Lanckoroński. They were later owned by the Lanckoroński family. Count Karol Lanckoroński, great art lover, who resided in Vienna, arranged in 1902 for The Girl in the Picture Frame to be exhibited with other Renaissance and Baroque paintings from his collection, in the palace purposely built to house the collection (Jacquingasse 16–18, near Vienna's Botanical Garden). The Gestapo seized it during World War II, but in 1947, it was returned to its rightful owners and placed in a Swiss bank vault. It was next exhibited in 1994 in an exhibition of the family's artworks at the Royal Castle, Warsaw, after which Karolina Lanckorońska donated the painting to the Royal Castle.

It was studied under the Rembrandt Research Project, led by Ernst van de Wetering, who analysed Girl and Scholar three times and in February 2006 confirmed they were painted by Rembrandt. They were then exhibited at the Rembrandthuis in Amsterdam and the Gemäldegalerie Berlin as a part of "Rembrandt - The Quest of a Genius", an exhibition marking the 400th anniversary of the painter's birth.

== Analysis ==
The subject was known as the Jewish Bride from at least 1769. A few other works by Rembrandt portraying women with long, loose hair were given the same title in the 17th century. According to Jewish tradition, a bride wore her hair loose when signing the marital contract with her fiancé.

Ernst van de Wetering argues that the Girl in the Picture Frame is a typical example of Rembrandt's interest, in the late 1630s and early 1640s, in Trompe-l'œil compositions. It is also an example of his search for new ways of representing movement. In van de Wetering's opinion, the present painting is exceptional and can be seen as one of the few works, and possibly their prototype, demonstrating Rembrandt's short-lived fascination with such questions.

Movement is suggested by the slight withdrawal of the girl's right arm and the arrangement of her right hand as if suspended just above the edge of the illusionistic picture frame. The pearl earring hanging from her right ear and the fabric of the right sleeve also seem to be in motion. The illusion of breaking up the conventional pictorial space was created by painting the figure in a frame with both hands extending beyond it.

== See also ==
- List of paintings by Rembrandt
- The Jewish Bride, Rembrandt (c. 1665–1669)
