= Joseph and Potiphar's Wife (Finoglia) =

Painting by Paolo Finoglia

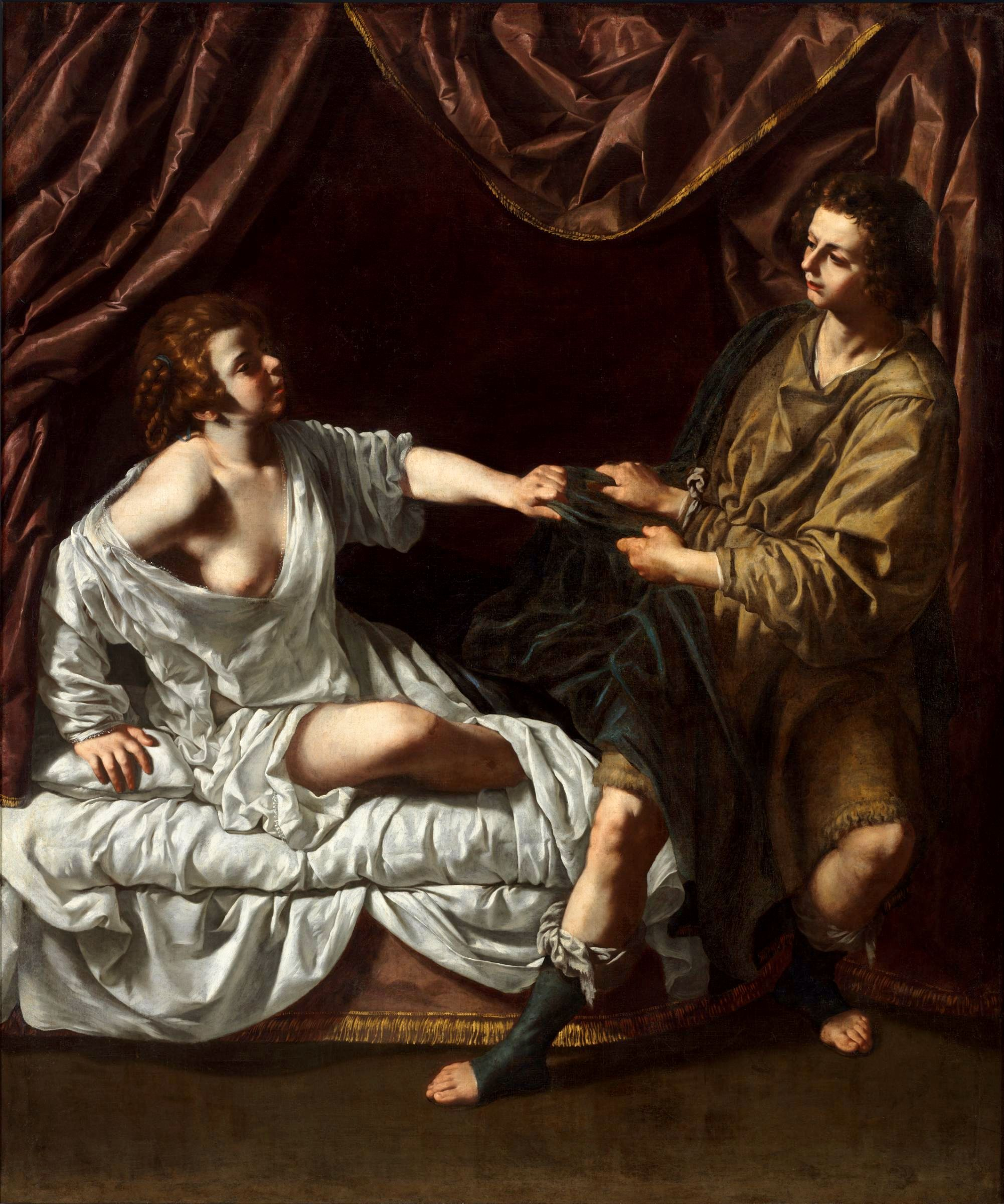
- Artist: Paolo Finoglia
- Year: 1620–1623 or c. 1640
- Location: Fogg Museum

Joseph and Potiphar's Wife is a 1620–1623 (or possibly c. 1640) painting by Paolo Finoglia. It was previously attributed to Artemisia Gentileschi. It was purchased by the Samuel H. Kress Foundation in 1950 and twelve years later was given by it to the Fogg Art Museum, its present owner.

The theme relates to the story told in Book of Genesis chapter 39, of Joseph in Potiphar's house.
