= The Scholar at the Lectern =

1641 painting by Rembrandt

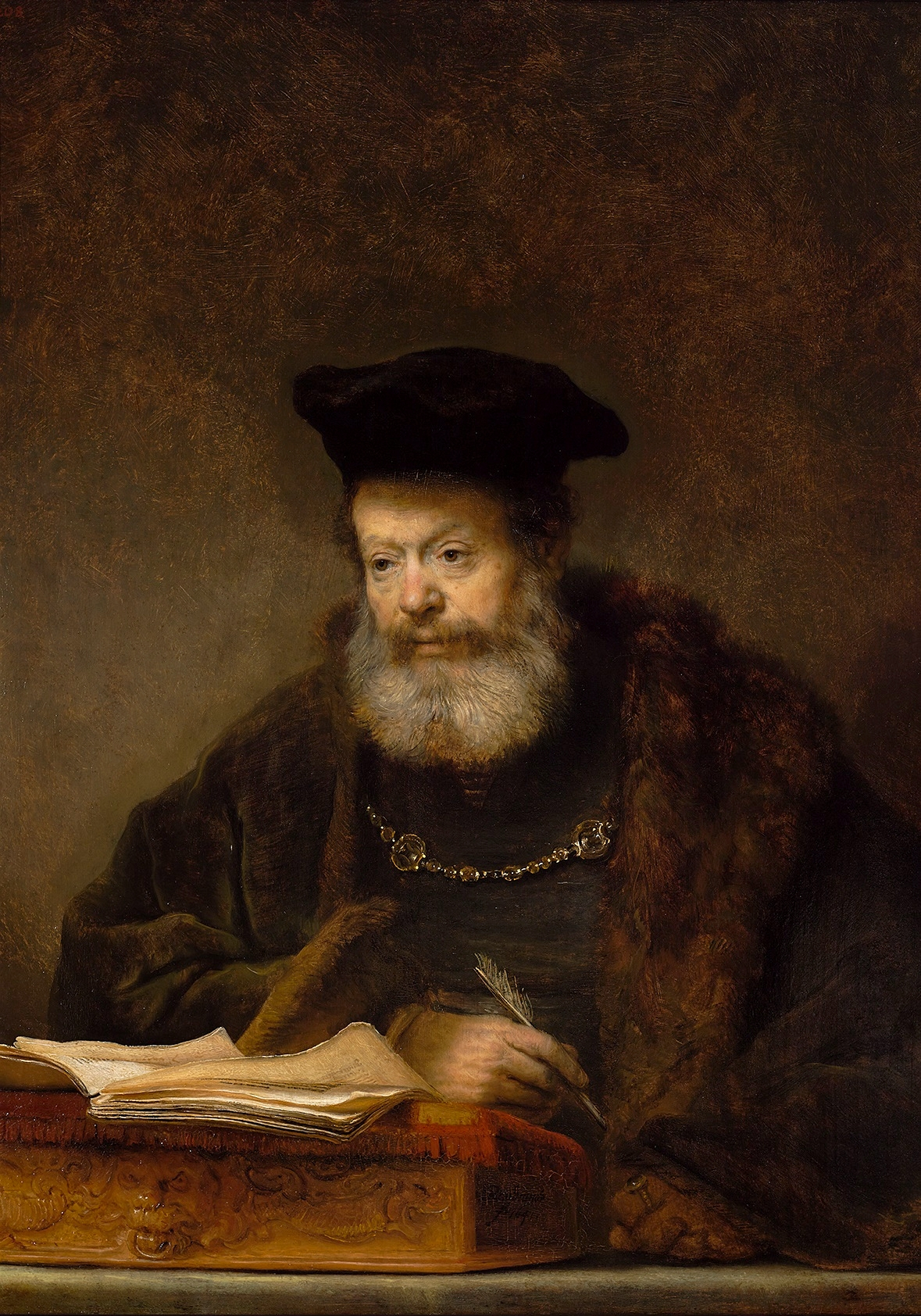
- Artist: Rembrandt
- Year: 1641
- Medium: Oil-on-panel
- Dimensions: 107.5 cm × 76.3 cm (42.3 in × 30 in)
- Location: Royal Castle, Warsaw, Poland

The Scholar at the Lectern or The Father of the Jewish Bride is a 1641 oil on panel painting by the Dutch artist Rembrandt. With The Girl in a Picture Frame (also known as The Jewish Bride) and Landscape with the Good Samaritan, it is one of only three Rembrandt paintings in Polish collections. It is currently located at the Royal Castle in Warsaw.

== Description ==
The sitter wears a black hat, a grey-brown cloak with a hint of green, lined with dark brown fur, and a gold chain. The subject of old scholars and philosophers is popular in Rembrandt's oeuvre. The face of the man in picture is distinctive because of specific details such as the wart on the left cheek and the red nose, suggesting a concrete sitter.

The picture is painted on poplar panel. The Royal Castle paintings are therefore two of five examples where Rembrandt or his workshop might have used poplar panels. Rembrandt probably bought a small batch of such panels c. 1639–41 and experimented with them.

== History and provenance ==
King Stanisław August Poniatowski bought it and The Girl in a Picture Frame in 1777 from Elżbieta Henrietta Maria Gołowkin (daughter of Friedrich Paul von Kameke) via the art dealer Jakob Triebel. He initially displayed them at the Łazienki Palace in Warsaw and after his death they both passed to Józef Poniatowski who in 1813 left them to his sister Maria Teresa Poniatowska. In 1815 they were bought by Kazimierz Rzewuski, who gave them to his daughter Ludwika, wife of Antoni Lanckoroński. The Gestapo seized it during World War II, but in 1947 it was returned to its rightful owners and taken to Hohenems Castle near Vaduz, Vorarlberg and later—in 1950—placed in a Swiss bank vault. It was next exhibited in 1994 in an exhibition of the family's artworks at the Royal Castle, Warsaw, after which Karolina Lanckorońska donated the painting to the Royal Castle.

It was considered lost after World War II and doubts on its authorship first appeared in 1969. It was not included in the 1989 edition of the Rembrandt Research Project. In 1994 Karolina Lanckorońska donated both it and The Girl in the Picture Frame to the Royal Castle, Warsaw, where they still hang. The Project accessed them and their authorship was confirmed in February 2006.

== Analysis ==
In 1769 the painting was called the Bride’s Father Writing Down the Dowry. Later, when the painting was in the Stanisław August collection, it was referred to as the Father of the Jewish Bride or other such variations. These titles suggest a thematic connection between The Scholar at the Lectern and The Girl in a Picture Frame. They also assume that the paintings were companion pieces, possibly because they were executed in the same year, are of the same size and use the same type of support. They were not in fact painted as a pair. Pairs of portraits painted by Rembrandt were always composed according to the following rule: the male portrait on the left, the female on the right, therefore contrary to the Royal Castle paintings.

In terms of composition, The Scholar at the Lectern and The Girl in a Picture Frame do not share the same scheme: the scale of the figures and their setting differ. Had the paintings been intended as a pair, both of them would have been portrayed within a feigned frame, as was the case of other portraits. The portraits of Agatha Bas and her husband Nicolaes van Bambeeck are a good example; they date from 1641 and are in London, Royal Collection and Brussels, Musées Royaux B.-A. respectively.

== See also ==
- List of paintings by Rembrandt

== Bibliography ==
- J. Czernichowska, Two paintings by Rembrandt
- (in Polish) Dorota Juszczak, Hanna Małachowicz, Galeria Lanckorońskich. Obrazy z daru Profesor Karoliny Lanckorońskiej dla Zamku Królewskiego w Warszawie, Warszawa 1998
- https://www.zamek-krolewski.pl/zwiedzanie/archiwum-wystaw-czasowych/portrety.-rembrandt-i...
- (in Polish) Two Rembrandts in the Royal Castle
