= Johannes Thopas =

Dutch Golden Age painter

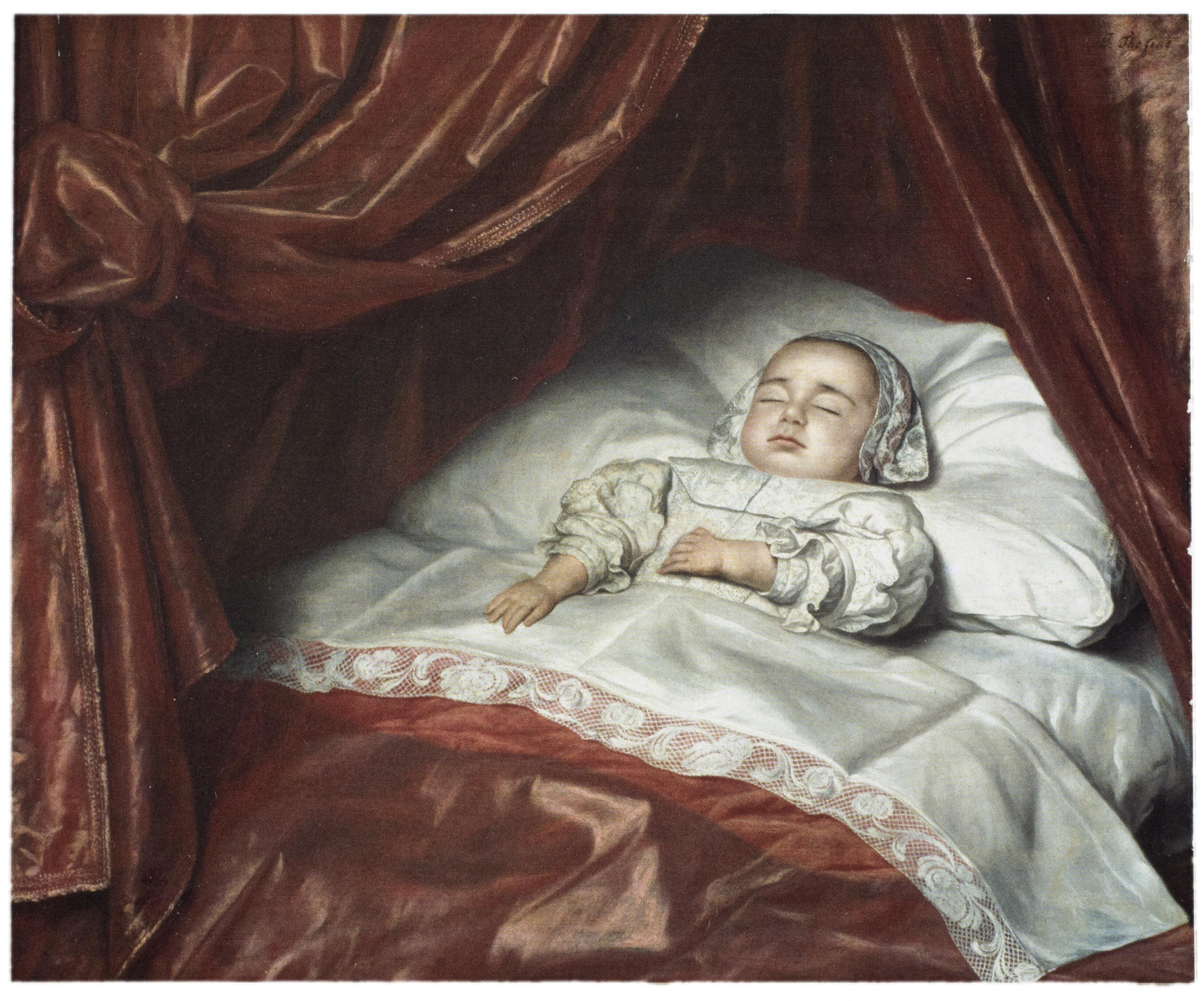
Portrait of a dead child of the Valkenburg family

Jan Thopas (1627–1695), was a Dutch Golden Age painter.

He was born in Arnhem and later moved to Assendelft via Amsterdam. He is known for portraits and miniatures, and died in Assendelft between 1685 and 1695.
