= Minerva (painting) =

1635 painting by Rembrandt van Rijn

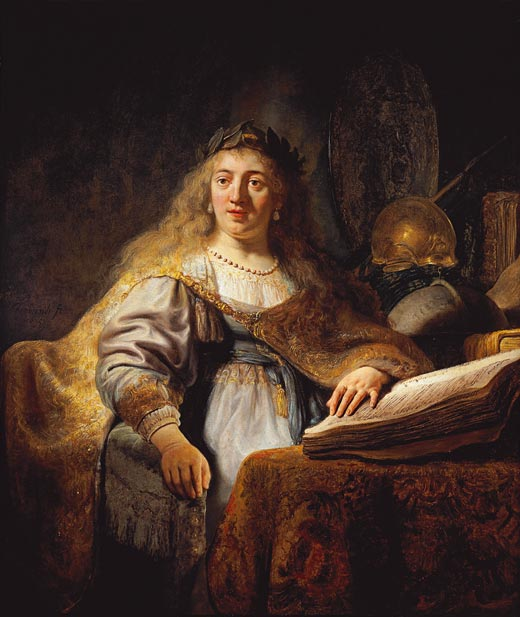

Minerva is a 1635 oil-on-canvas painting by Rembrandt, now in a Canadian private collection.

Its earliest recorded owner was James Somerville, 12th Lord Somerville (1674–1709), owner of The Drum in Edinburgh. It remained in the possession of the Somerville family until Louisa Harriet Somerville's death in 1923. On 21 November 1924 it was auctioned at Christie's in London to either the New York art dealer Lewis and Simmons or to a Mr. Smith. It was later owned by the Duveen Brothers and in 1929 by Jules Bache. Soon afterwards it was acquired by the Hungarian collector Marcell Nemes in Munich. His collection was auctioned off by Helbin in Munich between 16 and 19 June 1931.

It was bought by one "Holland" of America. It was later owned by Axel Lennart Wenner-Gren, a Swedish collector whose works were auctioned at Sotheby's in London on 24 March 1965. It was later bought by Antenor Patiño and in 1975 by Marcel Bich. From 1988 to 2011 it formed part of the Bridgestone art collection on display at the Bridgestone Museum of Art in Tokyo. In 2001 it was bought by the art dealer Otto Naumann, who in March 2002 exhibited it at The European Fine Art Fair. Naumann later sold it to its present owner.

== See also ==
- List of paintings by Rembrandt
