= The Crossing of the Red Sea (Poussin) =

Painting by Nicolas Poussin

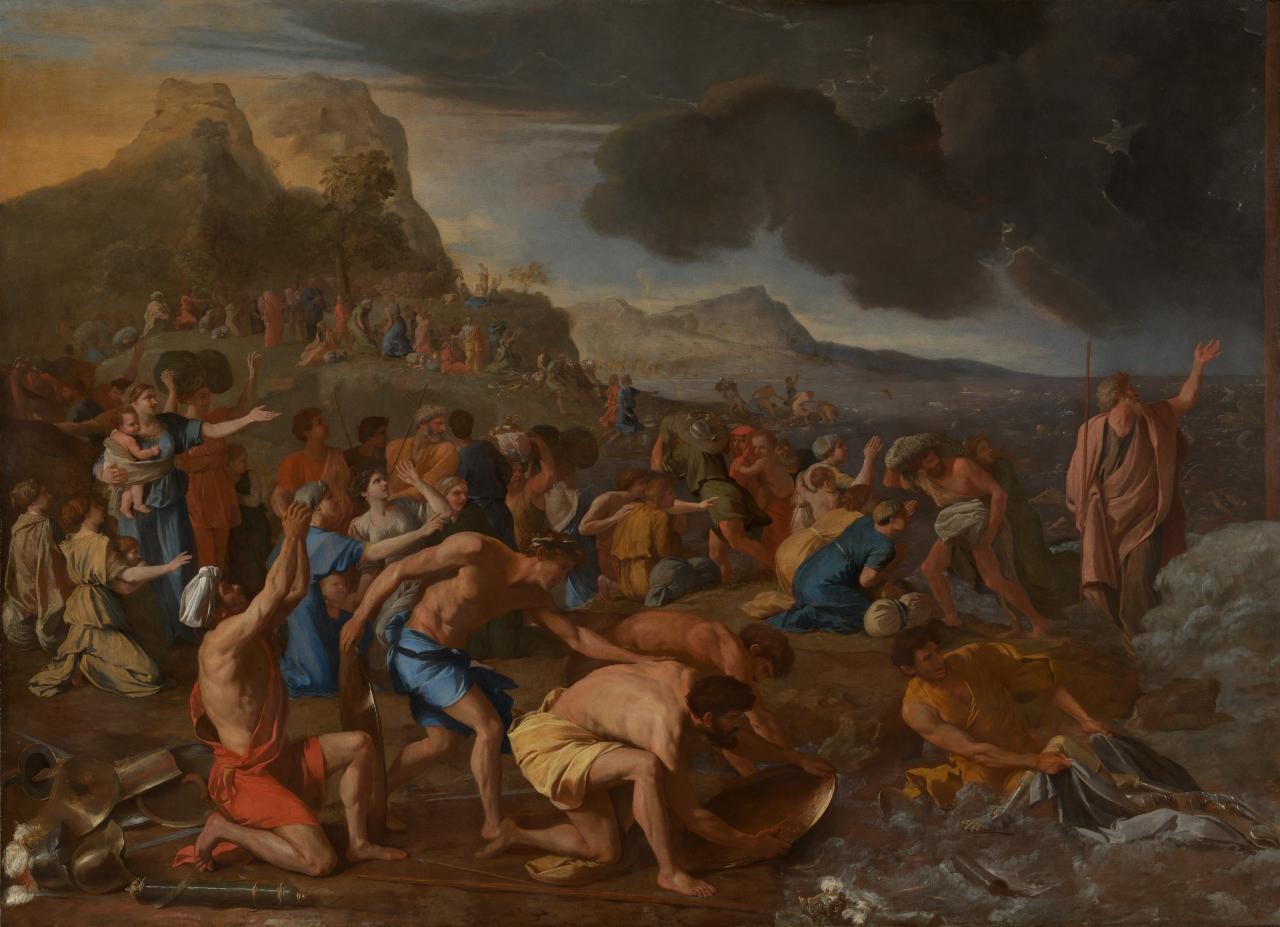
- Artist: Nicolas Poussin
- Year: 1633-1634
- Medium: Oil on canvas
- Dimensions: 155.6 cm × 215.3 cm (61.3 in × 84.8 in)
- Location: National Gallery of Victoria, Melbourne

The Crossing of the Red Sea is an oil on canvas painting by Nicolas Poussin, produced between 1633 and 1634. It depicts the crossing of the Red Sea by the Israelites, from chapter 14 of the book of Exodus. It is held at the National Gallery of Victoria, in Melbourne.

== History ==
It was made as part of a pair of paintings (the other being The Adoration of the Golden Calf) commissioned by Amadeo dal Pozzo, Marchese di Voghera of Turin, a cousin to Cassiano dal Pozzo, Poussin's main sponsor in Rome. By 1685 the pair had passed to the Chevalier de Lorraine and in 1710 they were bought by Benigne de Ragois de Bretonvillers.

In 1741 the pair was bought from Samuel by Sir Jacob Bouverie, whose son William became the first Earl of Radnor. The Earls of Radnor owned the pair from then until 1945, when it was split for the first time and The Adoration of the Golden Calf was sold to the National Gallery in London. The Crossing of the Red Sea was acquired by Kenneth Clark for the National Gallery of Victoria in 1948 using money from the Felton Bequest, a fund originally left to the gallery in 1904 by the industrialist Alfred Felton. In 2011 it underwent a major conservation project.

The dating of The Crossing of the Red Sea by Nicholas Poussin was one of scholarly debate, as the time frame in which the work was produced in relation to the other accompanying works was originally speculated. The work was initially believed to have been made within a short time after The Adoration of The Golden Calf, during the period of 1635–1638. Which rightfully placed both works at having been created during the time before Poussin departed from Rome, Italy where the works were commissioned to Paris, France. Without any evidence to contradict the timeframe of the works creation was generally accepted by the broader art historian community for generations. Though over time and in spite of this acceptance, a vocal minority has argued that The Crossing of the Red Sea should be dated as an early work due to the stylistic issues present which were notably absent from Poussins works after The Adoration of The Golden Calf. Officially establishing the works origins as a point of academic contention, though it was not until later evidence arose to suggest otherwise that this claim was brought forth for academic discussion. The dating method used on the works consisted of analyzing sketches and drawings which were believed to be precursors to The Crossing of the Red Sea, due to their stylings and themes. Upon closer inspection some art historians have come to believe that the sketches argued to be the beginnings of The Crossing of the Red Sea, are instead related to an unknown work believed to have been made in 1647–1648. The reasoning behind the debate over the origins of the work is due to a desire for understanding the works relation within the larger biblical collections created by Poussin. Establishing the thematic context and progression throughout Poussins works. This is further exemplified by the artists desire and intentions when meticulously crafting the works. As the two commissioned works prior to their completion were publicly perceived as being connected, leading to deliberate stylistic and design choices to highlight the contrasts between the works when examined together. This discussion ultimately culminated in the current believed origin of the piece dating its creation within 1633–1634.

== See also ==
- List of paintings by Nicolas Poussin
