= 1703 in art =

Events from the year 1703 in art.

== Events ==
- May – The Cabin of Peter the Great is constructed in three days, by soldiers of the Semyonovsky Regiment. Its wooden walls are painted with red oil to resemble brick, and the rooms come to be known as the "red chambers".
- Pierre Le Gros the Younger completes the tomb of Cardinal Girolamo Casanate in the Archbasilica of St. John Lateran, Rome.

== Paintings ==
- Nicolas de Largillière – La belle Strasbourgeoise
- Sebastiano Ricci – Rape of the Sabine Women
- Adriaen van der Werff – Jesus Laid in the Tomb
- Lancelot Volders – Group portrait of the Leuven justices

== Births ==
- February 18 – Corrado Giaquinto, Italian Rococo painter (died 1765)
- September 29 – François Boucher, French Rococo painter, engraver and designer (died 1770)
- date unknown
  - Sir Henry Cheere, 1st Baronet, English sculptor (died 1781)
  - Ignazio Hugford, or Ignatius Heckford, Florentine painter (died 1778)
  - Gaetano Sabatini, Italian draftsman and painter (died 1734)
  - Andrea Soldi, Italian portrait painter working in London (died 1771)
  - William Taverner, English judge and landscape artist (died 1772)

== Deaths ==
- March 16 – Maria de Dominici, Maltese sculptor and painter (born 1645)
- March 30 – Lazzaro Baldi, Italian painter of the Baroque period, active mainly in Rome (born 1624)
- April 8 – Domenico Piola, Genoese painter (born 1627)
- May 3 – Eglon van der Neer, Dutch painter of portraits and landscapes (born 1634)
- July 26 – Gérard Audran, French engraver of the Audran family (born 1640)
- October 13 – Marie Courtois, French miniature painter (born 1655)
- December 29 – Pierre Monier, French painter, winner of the Prix de Rome (born 1639)
- date unknown
  - Sébastien Barras, French painter and engraver (born 1653)
  - Mosen Vicente Bru, Spanish painter (born 1682)
  - Biagio Falcieri, Italian painter of the Baroque era (born 1628)
  - Giuseppe Nuvolone, Italian painter active mainly in Milan, Brescia, and Cremona (born 1619)
  - Bogdan Saltanov, Armenian-born Russian painter (born 1630s)
  - Jan Siberechts, Flemish painter (born 1627)
  - Matthias Withoos, Dutch painter of still lifes and city scenes (born 1627)
- probable (or 1704) – Pompeo Ghitti, Italian painter of frescoes (born 1631)
