= The Adoration of the Golden Calf =

Painting by Nicolas Poussin

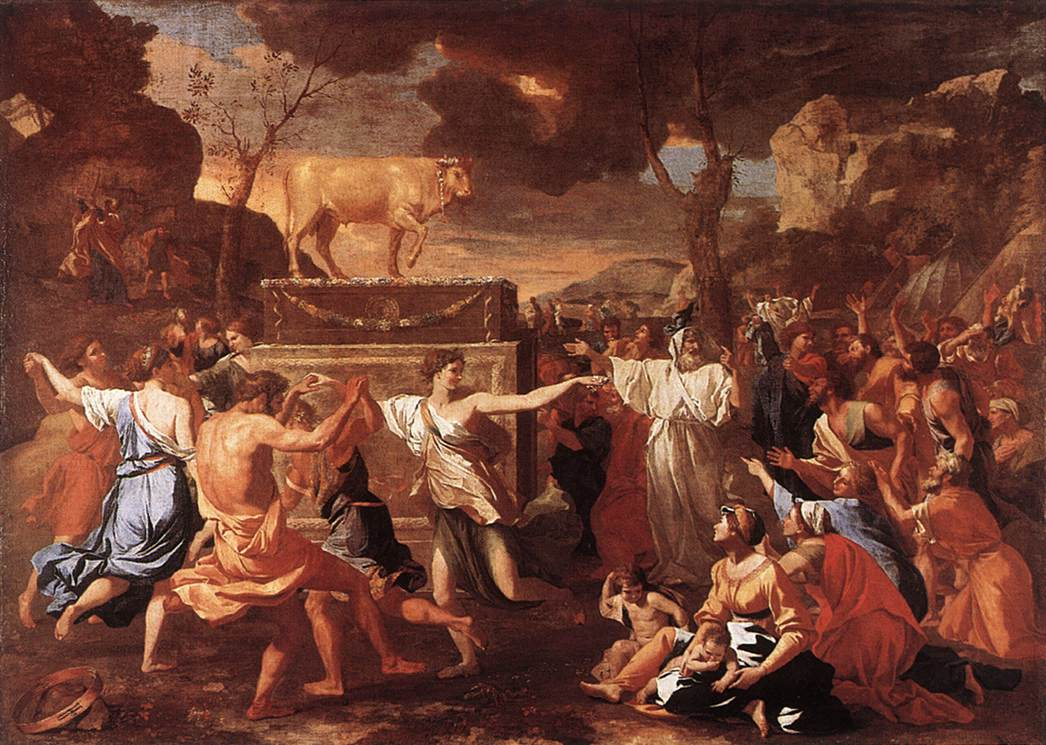
- Artist: Nicolas Poussin
- Year: 1633–1634
- Medium: Oil on canvas
- Dimensions: 154 cm × 214 cm (61 in × 84 in)
- Location: National Gallery; London

The Adoration of the Golden Calf is a painting by Nicolas Poussin, produced between 1633 and 1634. It is held in the National Gallery, in London.

== History ==
It depicts the adoration of the golden calf by the Israelites, from chapter 32 of the Book of Exodus. It was made as part of a pair of paintings (the other being The Crossing of the Red Sea) commissioned by Amadeo dal Pozzo, Marchese di Voghera of Turin, a cousin to Cassiano dal Pozzo, Poussin's main sponsor in Rome. By 1685 the pair had passed to the Chevalier de Lorraine and in 1710 they were bought by Benigne de Ragois de Bretonvillers. In 1741 they were bought from Samuel by Sir Jacob Bouverie, whose son William became the first Earl of Radnor. The Earls of Radnor owned the pair from then until 1945, when it was split for the first time and The Adoration of the Golden Calf bought by the National Gallery in London for £10,000, half of which was contributed by the Art Fund. (The Crossing of the Red Sea was bought in the same 1945 sale by the National Gallery of Victoria.) It now hangs in Room 19 of the National Gallery, where it and Poussin's The Adoration of the Shepherds were vandalised with red spray paint on 17 July 2011. The French-speaking vandal covered up most of the nude figures.

== Description ==
The painting's subject follows an event described in the Book of Exodus, chapter 32: during Moses' ascent to Mount Sinai, Aaron gathered the people's gold to build a Golden Calf, an idol inspired by the Egyptians deities, despite the prohibition of the third commandment of the Decalogue. Moses, returning back with Joshua, discovers the scene of idolatry, lifts the tablets of the Law to break them.

The canvas shows the Golden Calf, placed on a base surmounted by an ornate pedestal, slightly at the left of the center of the composition, who is surrounded by a farandole of female and male dancers, on the left, and a kneeling crowd, on the right, leaning and listening to Aaron, who appears dressed in white. The decoration of the painting includes two trees on either side, a dry one on the right, and another bearing foliage on the left, in the direction of the two men descending from the mountain, Moses and Joshua. Moses, who holds the tablets of the Law above his head, is about to break them, in outrage over the idolatry of the people.

== See also ==
- List of paintings by Nicolas Poussin
- 100 Great Paintings, 1980 BBC series
