= Dancker Danckerts =

Dutch engraver and publisher

Dancker Danckerts (baptized 5 February 1634 in Amsterdam – buried 8 December 1666 in Amsterdam) was a well known Dutch engraver and publisher. Danckerts was the son of nl:Cornelis Danckerts of Amsterdam and Anne Minne of Leiden. The Danckerts belonged to a large Amsterdam family of engravers, cartographers, print-sellers and publishers. Danckerts was known for both his etchings of paintings, maps and his publications. His works are widely collected and feature in numerous museum, library and archive collections around the world. Dancker Danckerts was active in Amsterdam from 1654 to 1666 with a probable passage to Venice in 1656 according to the inscription on a drawing in Parma.
