= Andrés López Polanco =

Spanish painter

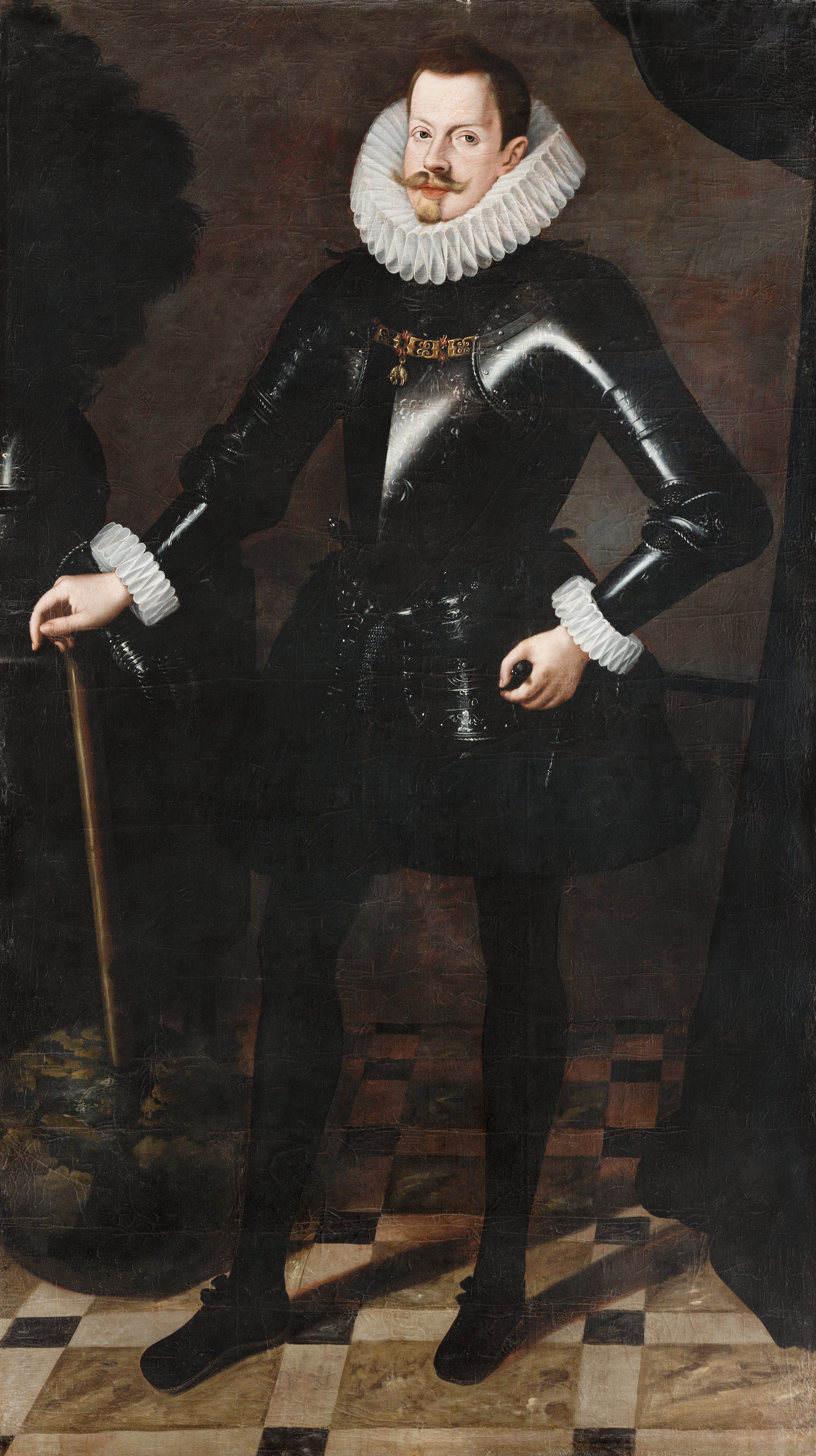
Philip III of Spain (1578 – 1621) by Andrés López Polanco, Skokloster Castle, c.1617

Andrés López Polanco (died 1641) was a Spanish Baroque painter specializing in portraits. Documented in Madrid between 1608 and 1641, he worked for the court of King Philip III of Spain and King Philip IV of Spain. His exact date of birth is unknown.

== Biography ==
Born perhaps in Valladolid, as deduced from its signature (Andres LOPEZ / Pinciano F.) in the portrait of Juan Bautista de Acevedo, second bishop of Valladolid. Preserved in its cathedral, documentation concerning Polanco starts in 1608 when signed a work painted for the monastery of Santa Clara de Madrid (Museo del Prado, placed in the Arte Museum of Pontevedra). In 1612 he was commissioned to conduct the appraisal of the property of Juan Pantoja de la Cruz on behalf of their heirs. We know that in 1615, he married Mary Almora, and bought a house near old town on Platería street. In 1626 his brother Jerónimo López Polanco died, who in his will stated he was a painter and native of Madrid, asking to be buried in the Church of San Miguel de los Octoes, where his parents, also residents of Madrid, had been buried. The documentation related to their participation in various business valuations, and on one occasion acting as intermediary Alonso Cano declares that in November 1641 Mary Almorais has become a widow.

In his portraits of Philip III (Nelahozeves Castle, Czech Republic) and Margaret of Austria, Queen of Spain, he does not depart from the tradition of court portraiture, gently resolving the details of the clothing.

Polanco painted in 1635 a series of Gothic kings located in the Buen Retiro Palace (Army Museum) including the portrait of the Count-Duke of Olivares (National Sculpture Museum (Valladolid)), where he copied Diego Velázquez portrait in São Paulo, with dryness and hardness, and without the cross of the Order of Calatrava.
