= Saskia with a Flower =

1641 painting by Rembrandt

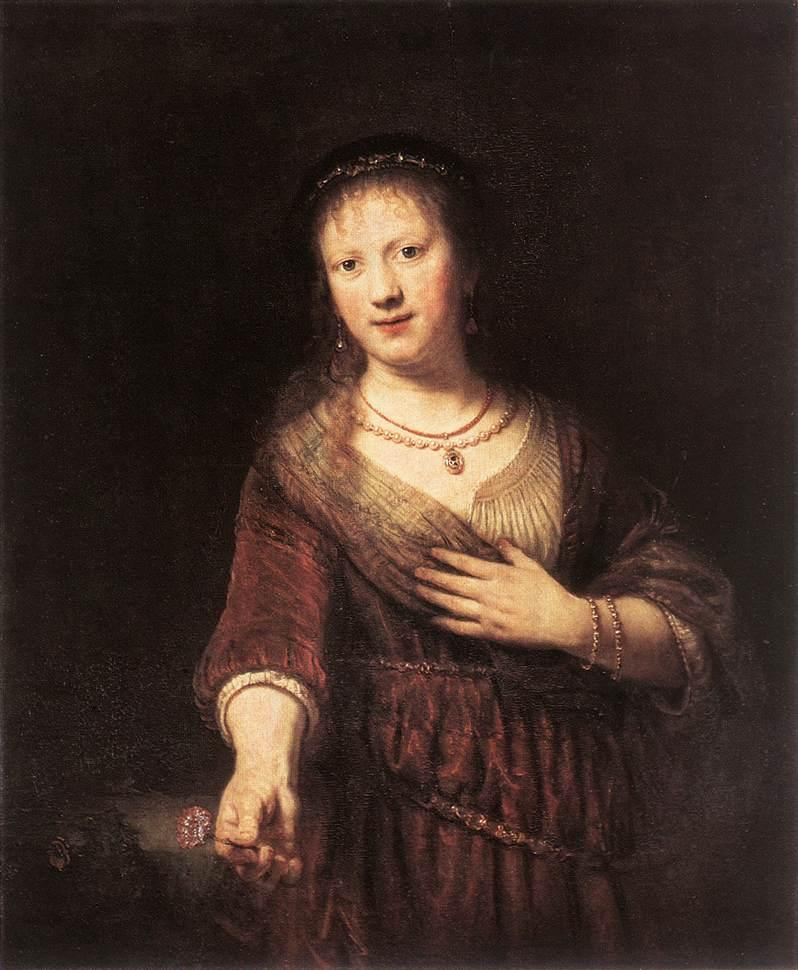

Saskia with a Flower is a 1641 oil on canvas portrait by Rembrandt of his wife Saskia van Uylenburgh, now in the Gemäldegalerie Alte Meister in Dresden. It is also known as Saskia with a Red Flower, Saskia with a Carnation or Saskia as Flora.

In 1741, it was owned by the Dutch nobleman Gerard Bicker van Zwieten (1687–1753), who put it up for auction with the rest of his collection on 12 April that year. The following year, Augustus III of Poland acquired it from the Araignon collection in Paris for his 'Kunstkammer' in Dresden.
