= Johann Hulsman =

German Baroque painter (1610–1652)

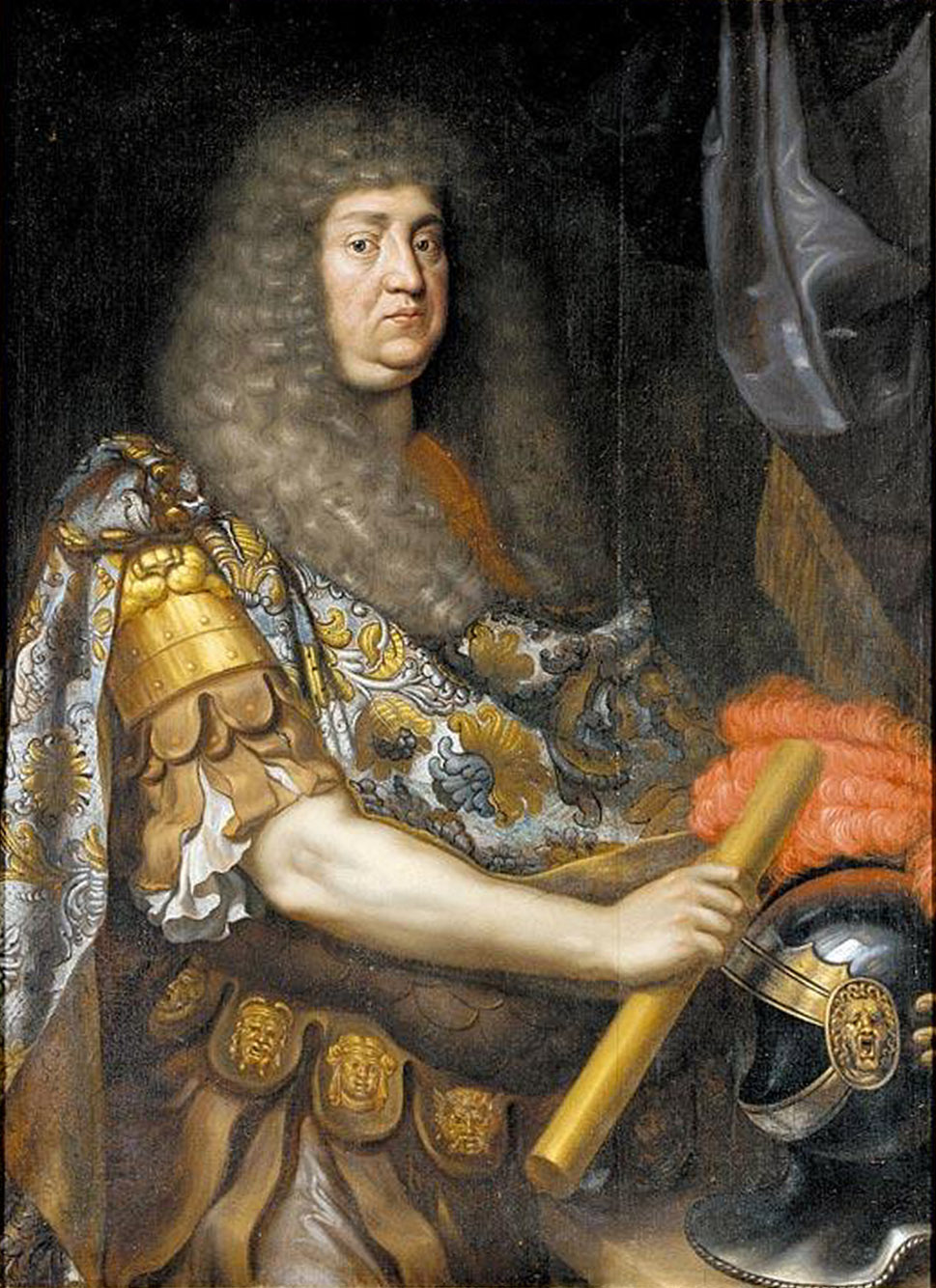
Portrait of John Frederick, Duke of Brunswick-Lüneburg by Johann Hulsman

Johann Hulsman, or Hans Holsman (1610 – 1652), was a German Baroque painter active in Cologne.

== Biography ==
According to Houbraken he was a painter from Cologne who painted for royalty, and Houbraken did not know more about him or his date of birth/death. Houbraken's source was Cornelis de Bie's work on painters called Het Gulden Cabinet. Joachim Sandrart also mentioned him in his book of painters.

According to the RKD he worked together with Johann Toussyn on a church altarpiece in Cologne. He was influenced by Dirk and Frans Hals, and Jurgen Ovens. He was the teacher of Johann Franz Ermels, and was active in Cologne during the years 1632–1646.
