= Johann Franz Ermels =

German painter and engraver (1641–1693)

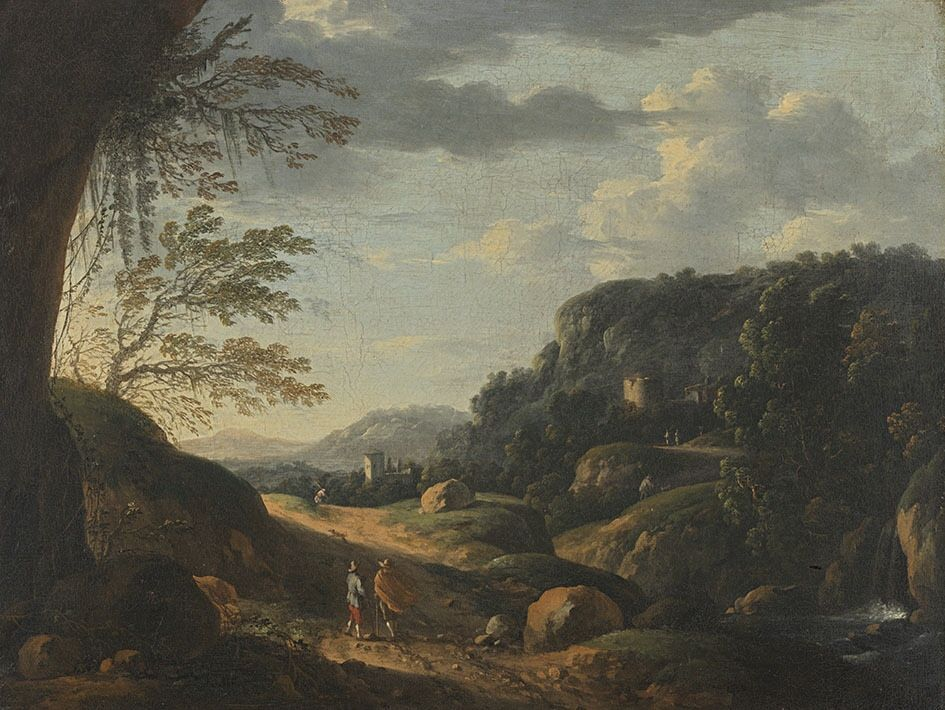
Landscape with staffage by Johann Franz Ermels

Johann Franz Ermels (1641 – December 1693), a German painter and engraver, a pupil of Holtzman, was born in Reilkirch. He resided at Nuremberg, and painted for the church of St. Sebald in that city a picture of the Resurrection; he was more successful, however, as a painter of landscapes, in which he imitated the style of Jan Both. He died at Nuremberg, aged 52. In the Städel Gallery at Frankfort is a Landscape by him, with figures by J. H. Roos; and in the Vienna Gallery is a Landscape with Fishermen by him. A Landscape is also in the Milan Gallery. There are by him a few etchings of landscapes, after Waterloo, Breenbergh, etc., executed with spirit and taste.

== See also ==
- List of German painters
