= Bartolomé Pérez =

Spanish painter

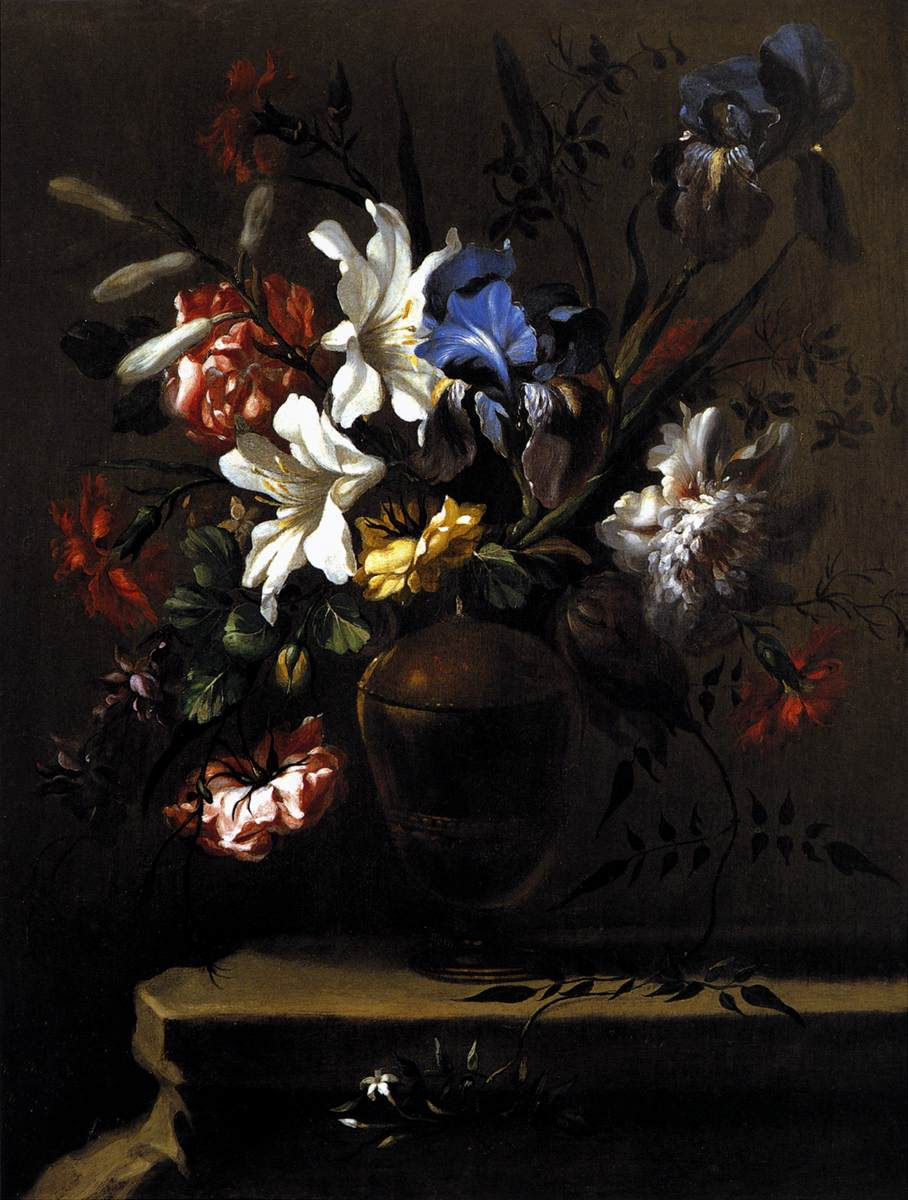
Vase of Flowers; c. 1690, 55 × 42 cm, private collection.

Our Lady of Good Counsel; c. 1680, 37 x 26 cm, Cleveland Museum of Art.

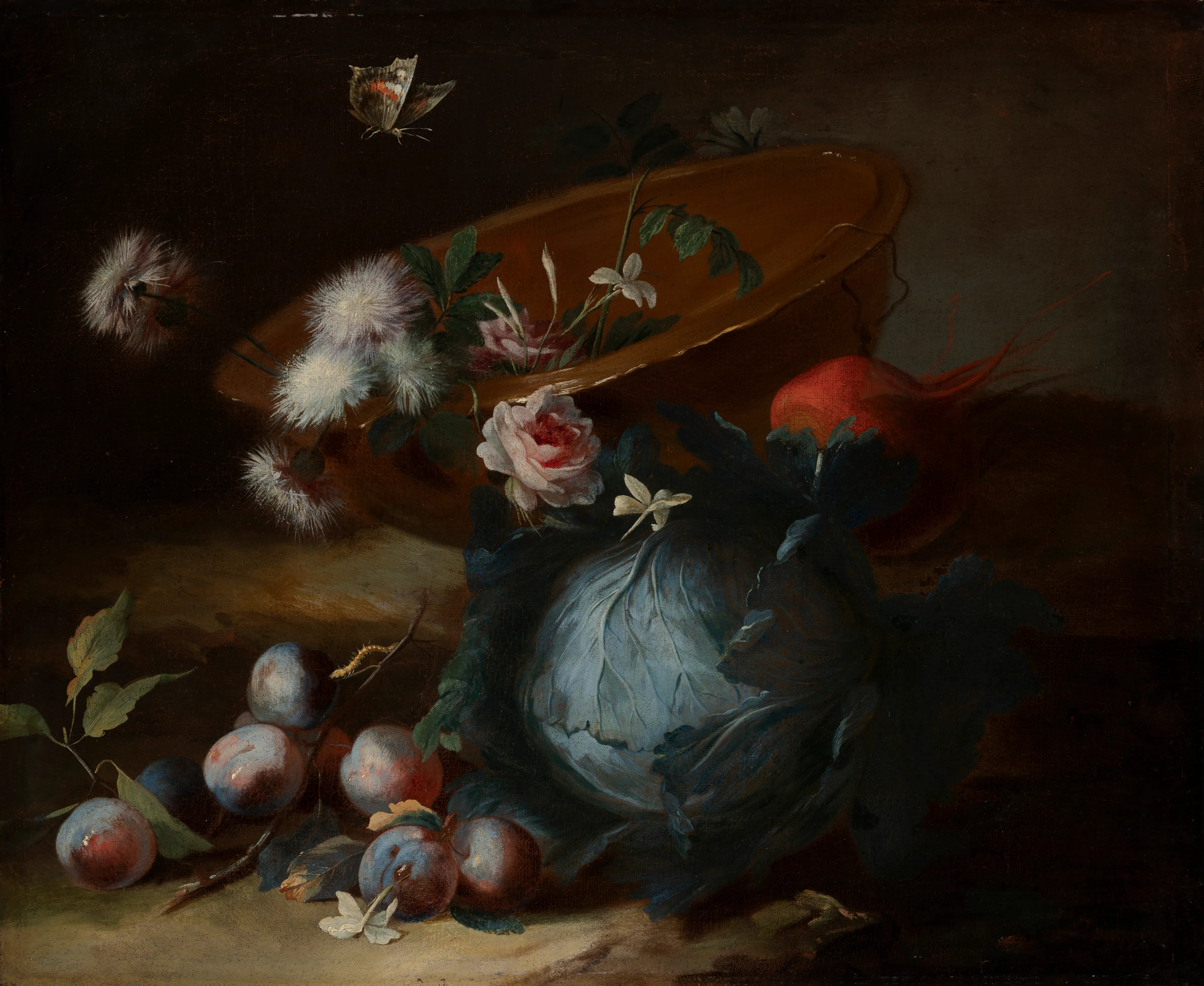
Still Life; 1654–93, 60 × 74 cm, Finnish National Gallery.

Bartolomé Pérez de la Dehesa (1634 – 16 January 1693) was a Spanish painter of the Baroque period.

Born in Madrid, he became the son-in-law and pupil of the painter Juan de Arellano. He is known as a painter of flowers and still life, known as bodegones. He also painted scenography for performances at the theater of Buen Retiro, for which he was named painter of the King without salary in January 1689. He died after falling from a scaffold used to paint the ceiling of the palace of Monteleon, and was buried in the church of San Ildefonso.

== Works ==
- Guirnalda de San Francisco de Borja' (c. 1675-80)
- Basket of Flowers (c.1675-1685)
- Garland of Flowers with St. Anthony of Padua (1689)
- Vase of Flowers (two paintings) (c. 1690)
- the Annunciation of the angel Gabriel (1690)
