= Joseph and Potiphar's Wife (etching) =

1634 etching by Rembrandt

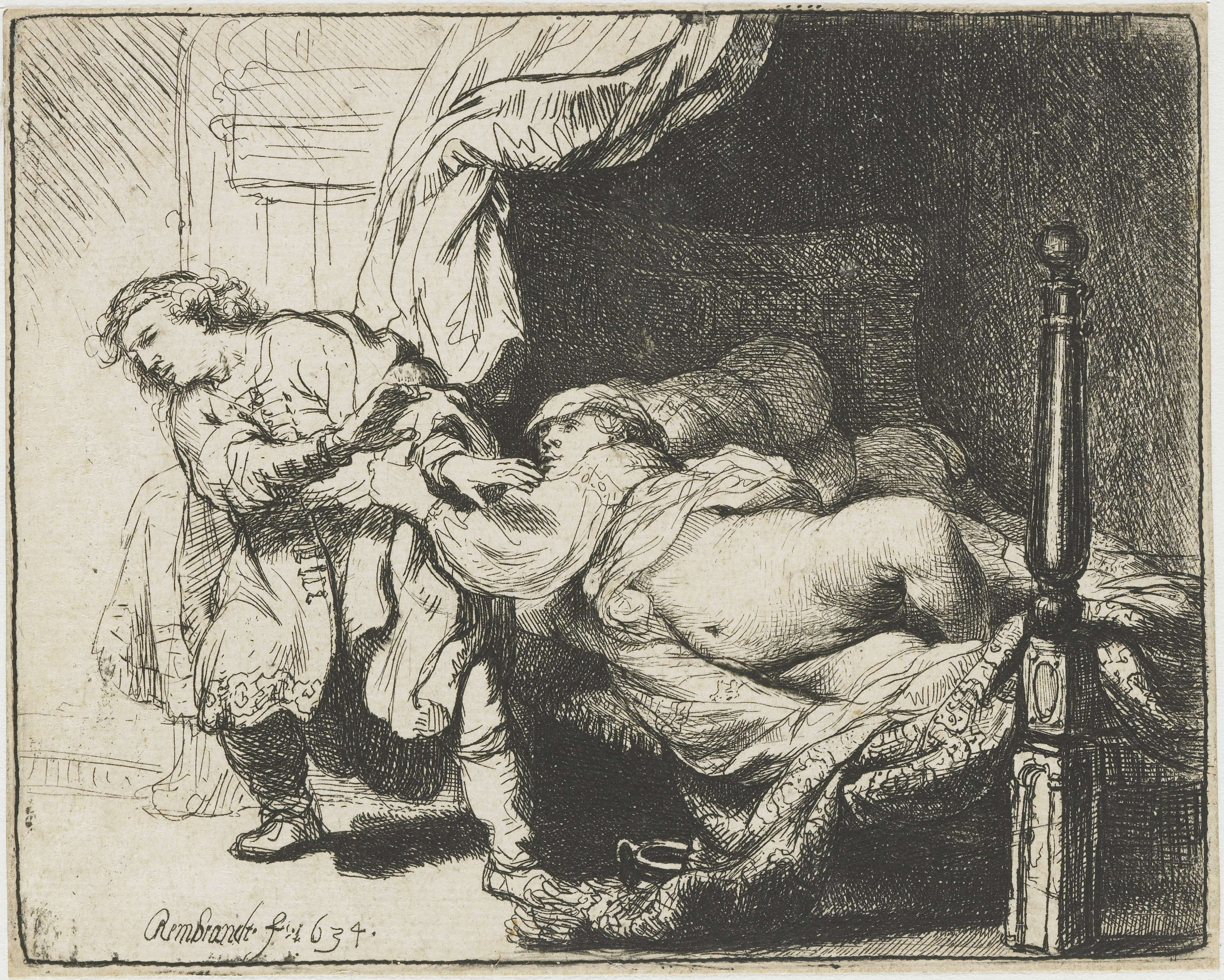
- Artist: Rembrandt
- Year: 1634
- Type: etching
- Dimensions: 9.1 cm × 11.4 cm (3.6 in × 4.5 in)

Joseph and Potiphar's Wife is a 1634 etching by Rembrandt (Bartsch 39). It depicts a story from the Bible, wherein Potiphar's wife attempts to seduce Joseph. It is signed and dated "Rembrandt f. 1634" (f. for fecit or "made this"), and exists in two states.

== Description ==
According to the Book of Genesis 39:1–20, Joseph was bought as a slave by the Egyptian Potiphar, an officer of the Pharaoh. Potiphar's wife tried to seduce Joseph, who eluded her advances. As Joseph repelled her attempt to lure him into her bed, she grabbed him by his coat: "And it came to pass about this time, that Joseph went into the house to do his business; and there was none of the men of the house there within. And she caught him by his garment, saying, Lie with me: and he left his garment in her hand, and fled, and got him out" (Genesis 39: 11–12). Citing his garment as evidence, Potiphar's wife falsely accused Joseph of having assaulted her, and he was sent to prison.

Rembrandt's etching is a dramatic presentation of the moment Potiphar's wife grabs the fleeing Joseph. Described by art historians Shelley Perlove and Larry Silver as "unprecedented in its erotic candor", it shows Joseph averting his eyes from the frankly depicted nude lower body of his master's wife. Only an etching of 1600 by Antonio Tempesta had portrayed a comparable sexual aggressiveness. Despite compositional similarities to the Tempesta, Rembrandt's depiction of human emotions—Joseph's revulsion and the desperation of Potiphar's wife—is unique to him, and the work is more blunt in its suggestion of the woman's physical appetite. As in his 1638 etching of Adam and Eve, the explicit depiction of the female's vulva is unusual, and emphasizes the seductress's lasciviousness; a persistent notion from antiquity to 17th century Holland was that a woman's genitals hungered insatiably for the male's seed. Of some 300 etchings that Rembrandt produced, Joseph and Potiphar's Wife was one of only four or five that may be classified as erotica; these prints were not widely disseminated during his life.

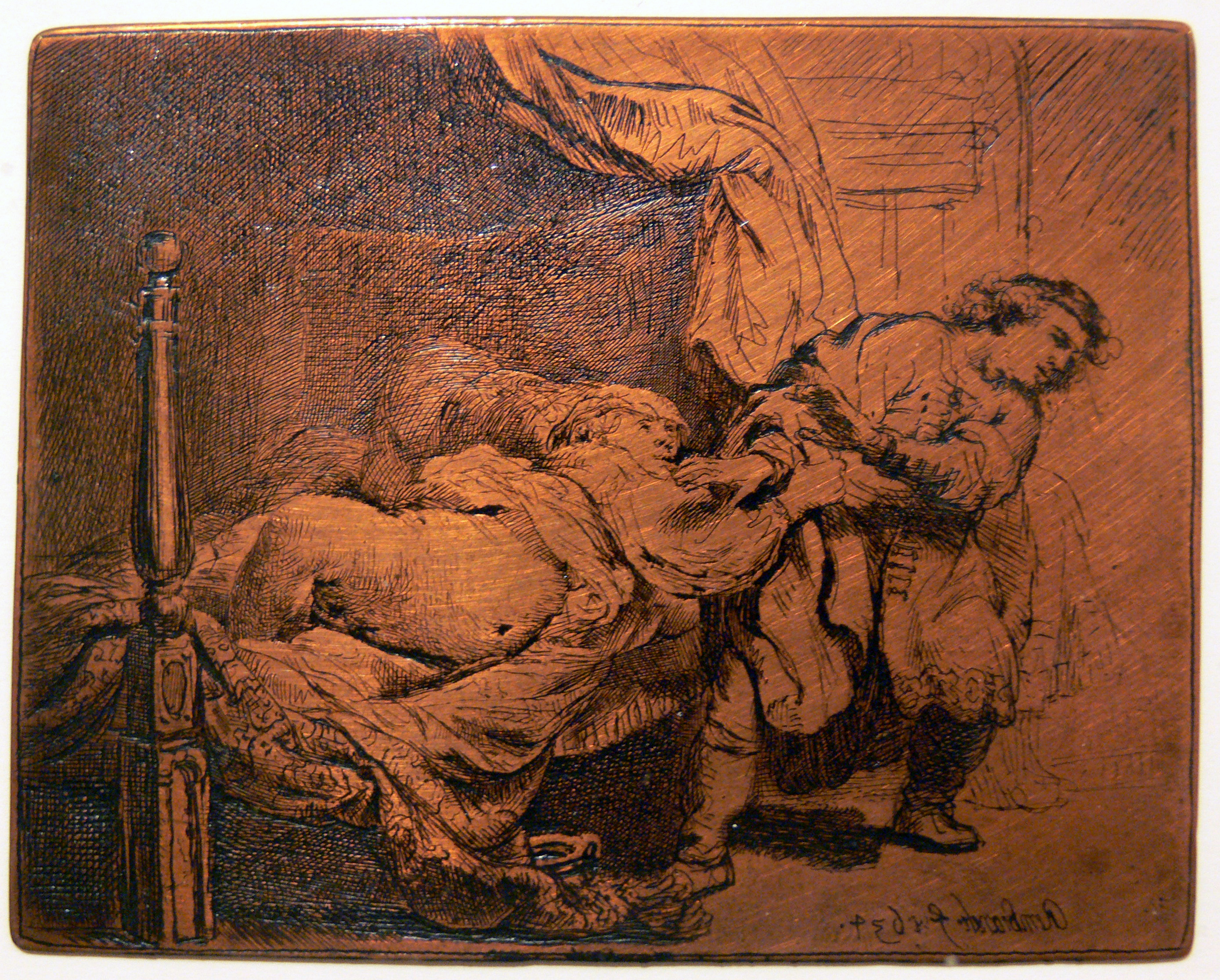
The original copper plate of Joseph and Potiphar's Wife, on loan to the Rembrandthuis

A context for Rembrandt's unidealized interpretation of the nude was proposed by Kenneth Clark, who noted that the artist's female figures from the early 1630s marked a break with the abundant exuberance of his contemporary, Peter Paul Rubens, and were at stark contrast with the classicism of the conventional nude. Rembrandt's etchings offered a "defiant truthfulness", as well as a sense of pity for physical imperfections, the fat and wrinkles of the human body.

Rembrandt may have intended moral implications in the dramatic use of light and shadow, with Joseph seen radiantly illuminated on the left side of the print and Potiphar's wife surrounded by the darkness of her bedchamber on the right. The rich tonal quality Rembrandt achieved in early etchings like Joseph and Potiphar's Wife was produced by his building dark areas with multiple overlays of hatched lines, gained through repeated work on successive states of the print.

The original printing plate survives in a private collection. The changes between the two states are minor, with some extra touches being added to the bed and bedding.

Rembrandt made etchings of two earlier episodes in Joseph's story, in B 37 (1638) and B 38 (c. 1633), which are similar sizes but in a vertical "portrait" format.
