= 1650 in art =

Events from the year 1650 in art.

== Events ==
- Giovanni Angelo Canini is received into the Accademia di San Luca of Rome
- Pieter van Bredael enters the Guild of Saint Luke in Antwerp.
- Govert Dircksz Camphuysen becomes a poorter and moves from Jordaan to Kalverstraat

== Paintings ==
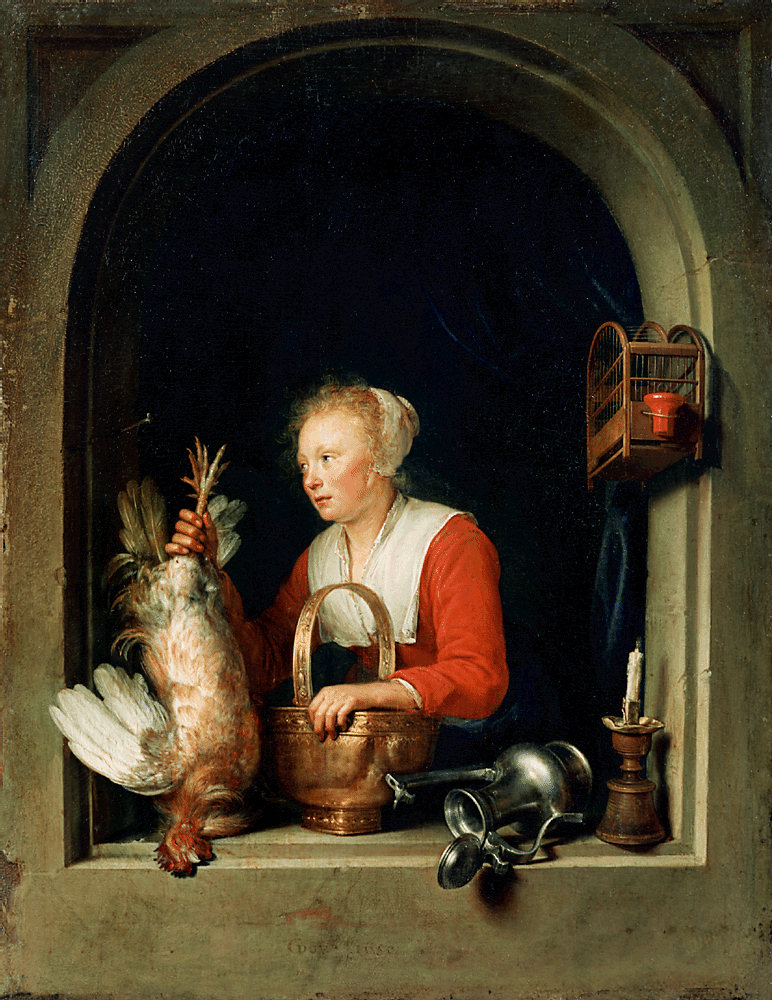
Dou – The Dutch Housewife

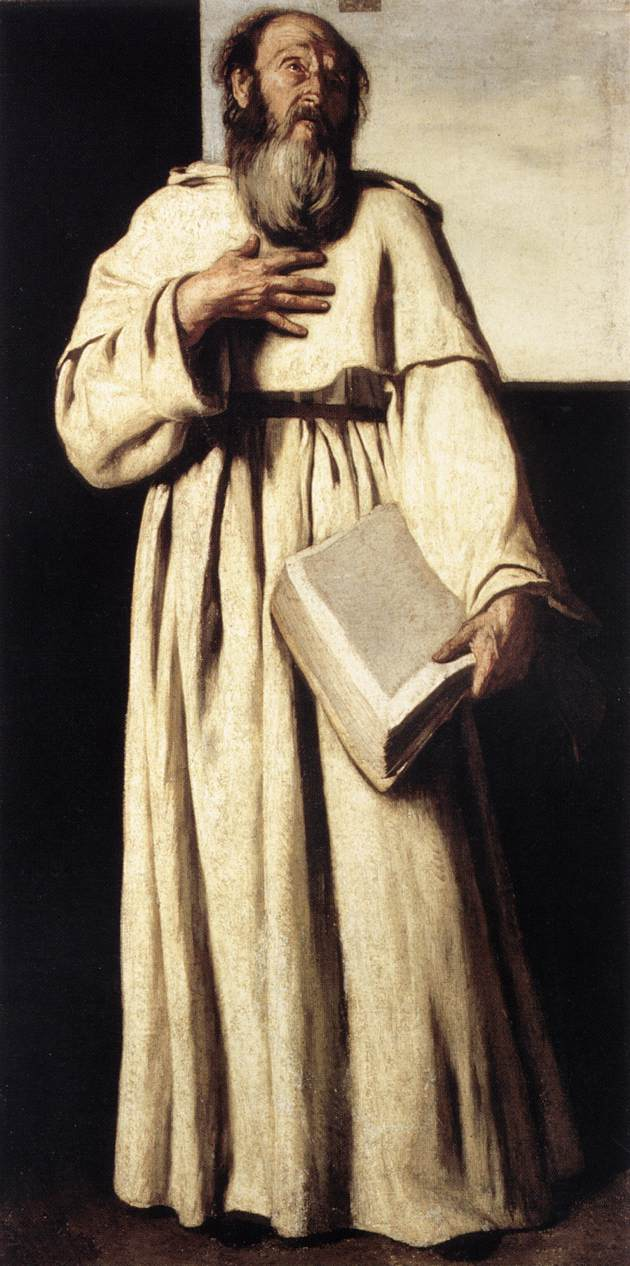
Falcone – The Anchorite

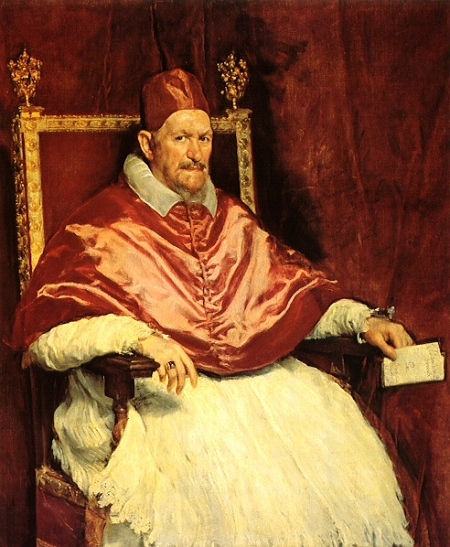
Velázquez – Innocent X

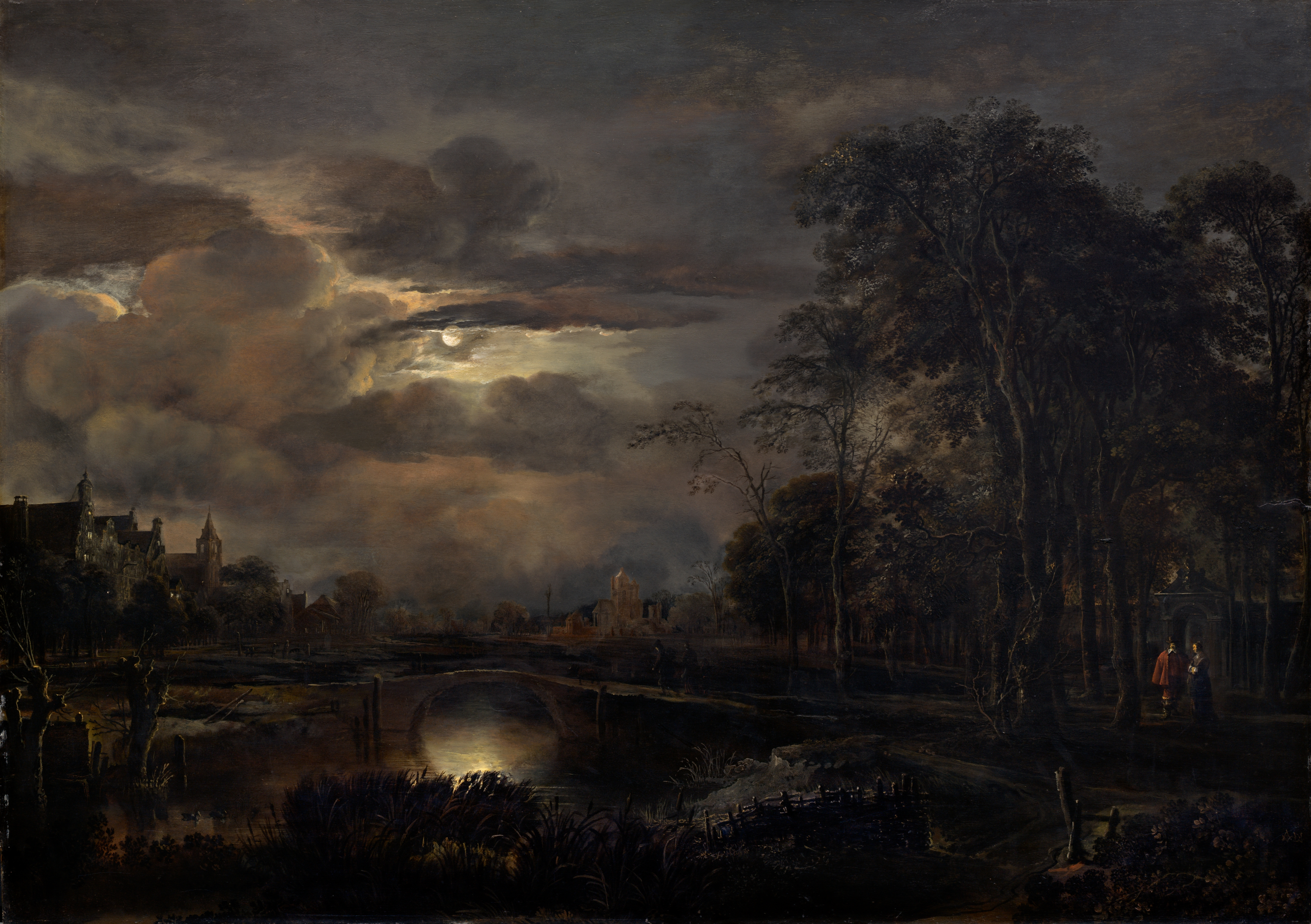
van der Neer - Moonlit Landscape with Bridge
- Bartolomeo Biscaino, Adoration of the Magi
- Claude Lorrain
  - Coast Scene with the landing of Aeneas
  - View of La Crescenza
- Gerard Dou – The Dutch Housewife
- Aniello Falcone – The Anchorite
- David Ryckaert – Temptation of St. Anthony
- Aernout van der Neer – Moonlit Landscape with Bridge (1648–50)
- Gerard van Honthorst – Portrait of Frederick Henry, Prince of Orange
- Diego Velázquez – approximate completion date
  - Portrait of Innocent X
  - Portrait of Juan de Pareja
- Helmich van Thweenhuysen II - Portrait of a Clergyman

== Births ==
- January 11 - Diana Glauber, Dutch-German painter (died 1721)
- April 16 - Jean Joly, French sculptor (died 1740)
- April 20 - Felice Boselli, Italian painter, active mainly in Piacenza (died 1732)
- October - Jan Mortel, Dutch painter (died 1719)
- date unknown
  - Rinaldo Botti, Italian painter born in Florence (died unknown)
  - Jean-Baptiste Boyer d’Éguilles, French engraver, painter, and collector (died 1709)
  - Margherita Caffi, Italian woman painter of Still lifes of flowers and fruit (died 1710)
  - Bernardino Ciceri, Italian painter (died unknown)
  - Jean Cornu, French sculptor (died 1710/1715)
  - Francisco de Artiga, Spanish landscape and historical painter (died 1711)
  - Alessandro Mari, Italian painter of capricci and symbolical representations (died 1707)
  - Carlo Moscatiello, Italian painter of quadratura (died 1739)
  - Giovanni Francesco Venturini, Italian painter and engraver (died 1710)
  - Huang Ding, Chinese landscape painter and poet during the Qing Dynasty (died 1730)
- probable
  - Valerio Baldassari, Italian painter (died 1695)
  - Domenico Maria Bonavera, Italian engraver (died unknown)
  - Giovanni Canti, Italian] painter of the Baroque (died 1716)
  - Jan Kryštof Liška, Czech Baroque painter (died 1712)
  - Garret Morphey, Irish painter of portraits, genre works and landscapes (died 1716)
  - John Slezer, Dutch- or German-born military engineer and artist (died 1717)
  - Jan van der Vaardt, Dutch painter of portraits, landscapes and trompe-l'œil (died 1727)

== Deaths ==
- January 17 – Tommaso Dolabella, Venetian painter (born 1570)
- January 18 – Matteo Rosselli, Italian painter (born 1578)
- June 19 – Matthäus Merian, Swiss engraver (born 1593)
- July 20 – Iwasa Matabei, Japanese painter (born 1578)
- December – Jacob Pynas, Dutch Golden Age painter (born 1583)
- date unknown
  - Giovanni Battista Barbiani, Italian painter of the Baroque period (born 1593)
  - Giovanni Battista Barca, Italian painter (born 1594)
  - Giovanni Campino, Italian painter from Camerino (born 1590)
  - Martin Droeshout, English engraver (born 1601)
  - Nicodemo Ferrucci, Italian painter (born 1574)
  - Guy François, French painter (born c.1578)
  - Baltazar Kuncz, Polish sculptor and woodcarver (born 1580)
  - Jean Nicolle, French painter (born 1610)
  - Antonio Randa, Italian painter active in Ferrara (born unknown)
  - Bartholomeus Strobel, Silesian Baroque painter (born 1591)
  - Pietro Testa, Italian High Baroque artist (born 1611)
  - Gerrit van Bloclant, Dutch Renaissance painter (born 1578)
  - Alessandro Vitali, Italian painter of the late-Renaissance and Baroque periods (born 1580)
