= 1794 in art =

Events from the year 1794 in art.

== Events ==
- English painter Thomas Birch comes to the United States to assist his artist father, William Birch, in preparing a 29-plate collection of engravings entitled Birch's Views of Philadelphia, eventually published in 1799.

== Works ==
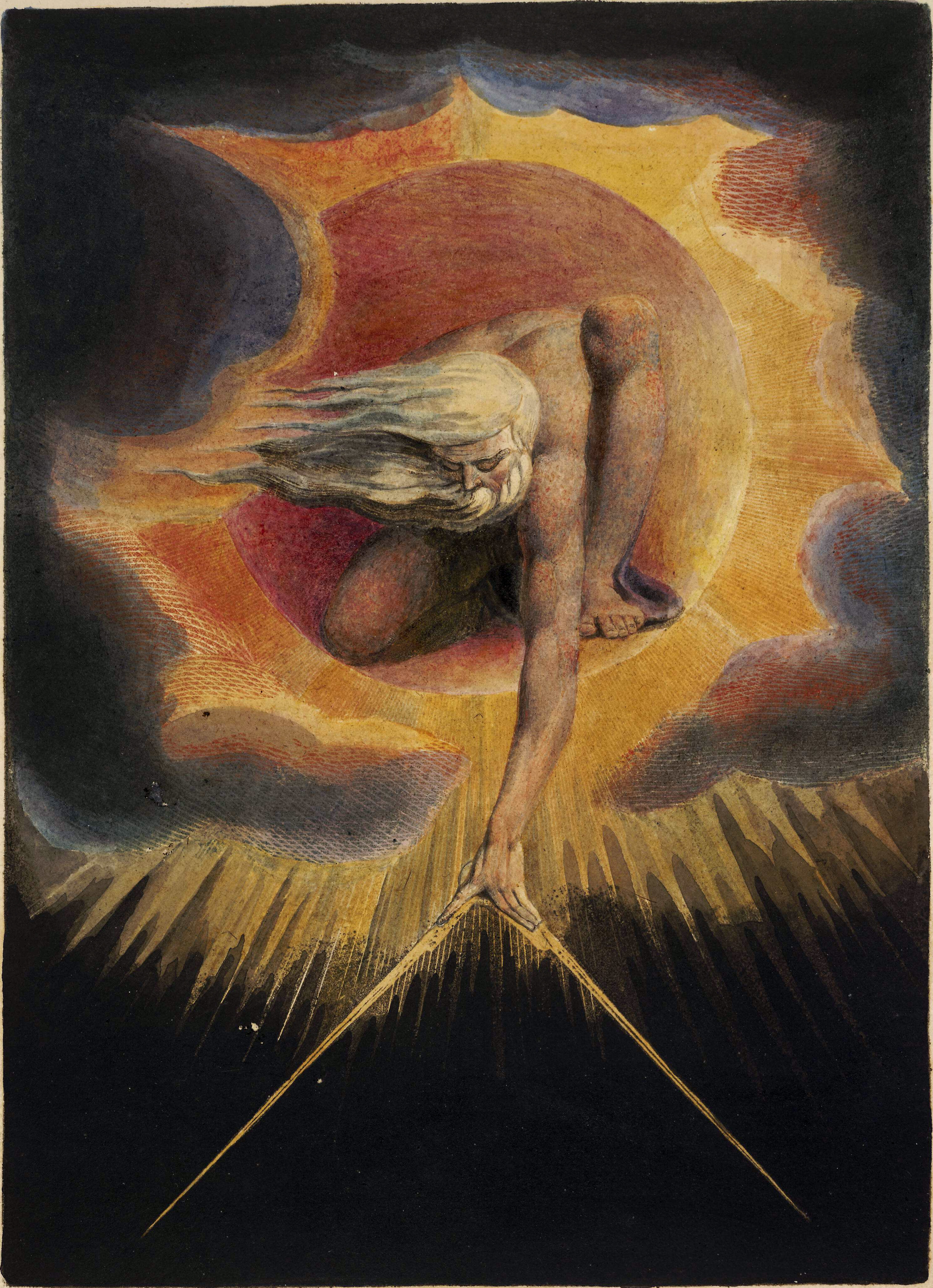
William Blake - The Ancient of Days (1794), watercolour etching

- Martin Archer Shee – Self-Portrait
- William Blake – The Ancient of Days
- Louis-Léopold Boilly – The Triumph of Marat
- Mather Brown – Lord Howe on the Deck of the Queen Charlotte
- Giuseppe Ceracchi – Alexander Hamilton (marble portrait bust)
- John Singleton Copley – Admiral of the Fleet Howe
- Jean-Pierre Norblin de La Gourdaine – The Hanging of Traitors in Effigy
- Johann Friedrich Dryander
  - Portrait du citoyen Laboucly, inspecteur de la viande
  - Portrait de Dominique Joseph Garat
  - Portrait du général Jourdan et de son adjutant
- John Flaxman – The Fury of Athamas (marble group; completed)
- William Hamilton – Marie Antoinette Being Taken to Her Execution
- Anton Hickel – Portrait of Charles James Fox
- Jean-François Hue – View of the Port of Brest
- Thomas Jones – Classical Landscape with a River
- Angelica Kauffman
  - Portrait of the Impromptu Virtuoso Teresa Bandettini-Landucci of Lucca
  - Self-portrait of the Artist hesitating between the Arts of Music and Painting
- Thomas Lawrence
  - Portrait of Lady Manners
  - A Gipsy Girl
  - Pinkie
- Philip James de Loutherbourg – The Grand Attack on Valenciennes
- Jean-Pierre Norblin de La Gourdaine – Hanging of traitors at Warsaw’s Old Town Market
- Jean-Baptiste Regnault – La Liberté ou la Mort ("Liberty or Death"; original lost)
- Gilbert Stuart
  - Portrait of Henry Cruger
  - Portrait of Horatio Gates
  - Portrait of John Jay
- George Stubbs – Baronet, with Samuel Chifney
- Benjamin West – Gentlemen Fishing
- Johann Zoffany – Plundering the King's Cellar at Paris

== Births ==
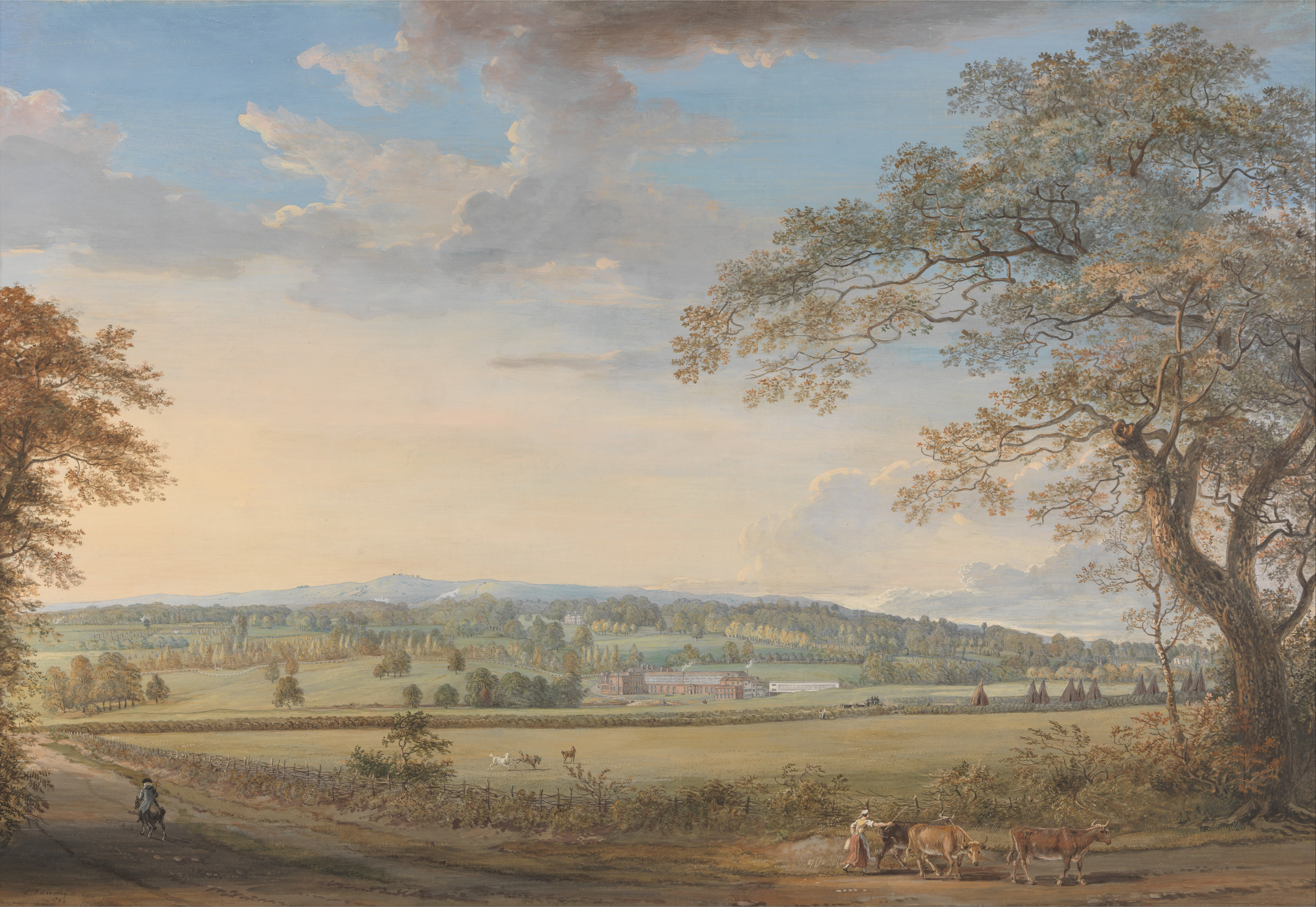
Paul Sandby – A View of Vinters at Boxley, Kent, with Mr. Whatman's Turkey Paper Mills (1794), gouache and watercolour painting on Whatman wove paper

- March 26 – Julius Schnorr von Carolsfeld, German painter (died 1872)
- May 13 – Louis Léopold Robert, Swiss painter (died 1835)
- June 3 – William Charles Ross, British painter of historical paintings, miniatures and portraits (died 1860)
- June 23 – Franz Nadorp, German painter who primarily worked and lived in Rome (died 1876)
- July 24 – Robert William Sievier, English engraver, sculptor and inventor (died 1865)
- August 29 – Léon Cogniet, French historical and portrait painter (died 1880)
- September 17 – Henry Wyatt, English portrait painter (died 1840)
- September 30 – Carl Joseph Begas, German historical painter (died 1854)
- October – Thomas Griffiths Wainewright, English painter, art critic, forger and probable serial poisoner (died 1847)
- October 19 – Charles Robert Leslie, English genre painter (died 1859)
- November 19 – James Stark, English painter (died 1859)
- December 31 – Samuel Jackson, English watercolour and oil painter (died 1869)
- date unknown
  - Ferdinand Deppe, German naturalist, explorer and painter (died 1861)
  - Abel Dimier, French sculptor (died 1864)
  - Joseph Patrick Haverty, Irish painter (died 1864)
  - William Heath, English satirical engraver (died 1840)
  - Jan Feliks Piwarski, Polish painter and professor of art (died 1859)
  - Johannes Baptista van Acker, Flemish portrait miniature painter (died 1863)

== Deaths ==
- April 4 – Hendrik-Jozef Antonissen, Dutch landscape painter (born 1737)
- April 14 – Samuel Hieronymus Grimm, Swiss watercolour painter (born 1733)
- May 13 – Pierre-François Brice, Belgian painter (born 1714)
- June 11 - Christoph Friedrich Reinhold Lisiewski, German portrait painter (born 1725)
- June 24 – Rosalie Filleul, French painter (born 1752)
- August 11 - Christian Ulrik Foltmar, Danish wallpaper weaver, painter of miniatures and organist (born 1716)
- October – Jean Humbert, Dutch portrait painter (born 1734)
- December 11 – Étienne Ficquet, French engraver (born 1719)
- date unknown
  - Vicente Calderón de la Barca, Spanish historical painter (born 1762)
  - François Boch, ceramicist, co-founder of Villeroy & Boch (born 1695)
  - Carl-Ludwig Christinek, Russian painter (born 1730/1732)
  - Philippe Curtius, wax modeller (born 1737)
  - Giacomo Leonardis, Italian engraver and etcher (born 1723)
  - Jacopo Marieschi, Italian vedute painter (born 1711)
