= 1707 in art =

List of years in art	(table)
- … 1697; 1698; 1699; 1700; 1701; 1702; 1703; 1704; 1705; 1706; 1707; 1708; 1709; 1710; 1711; 1712; 1713; 1714; 1715; 1716; 1717 …
- Art; Archaeology; Architecture; Literature; Music; Philosophy; Science; +...

Events from the year 1707 in art.

== Events ==
- Antoine Coypel becomes professor and rector of the Académie de peinture et de sculpture.
- James Thornhill begins work on the Painted Hall of the Royal Hospital for Seamen, Greenwich (completed 1727), probably having concluded work at Chatsworth House.

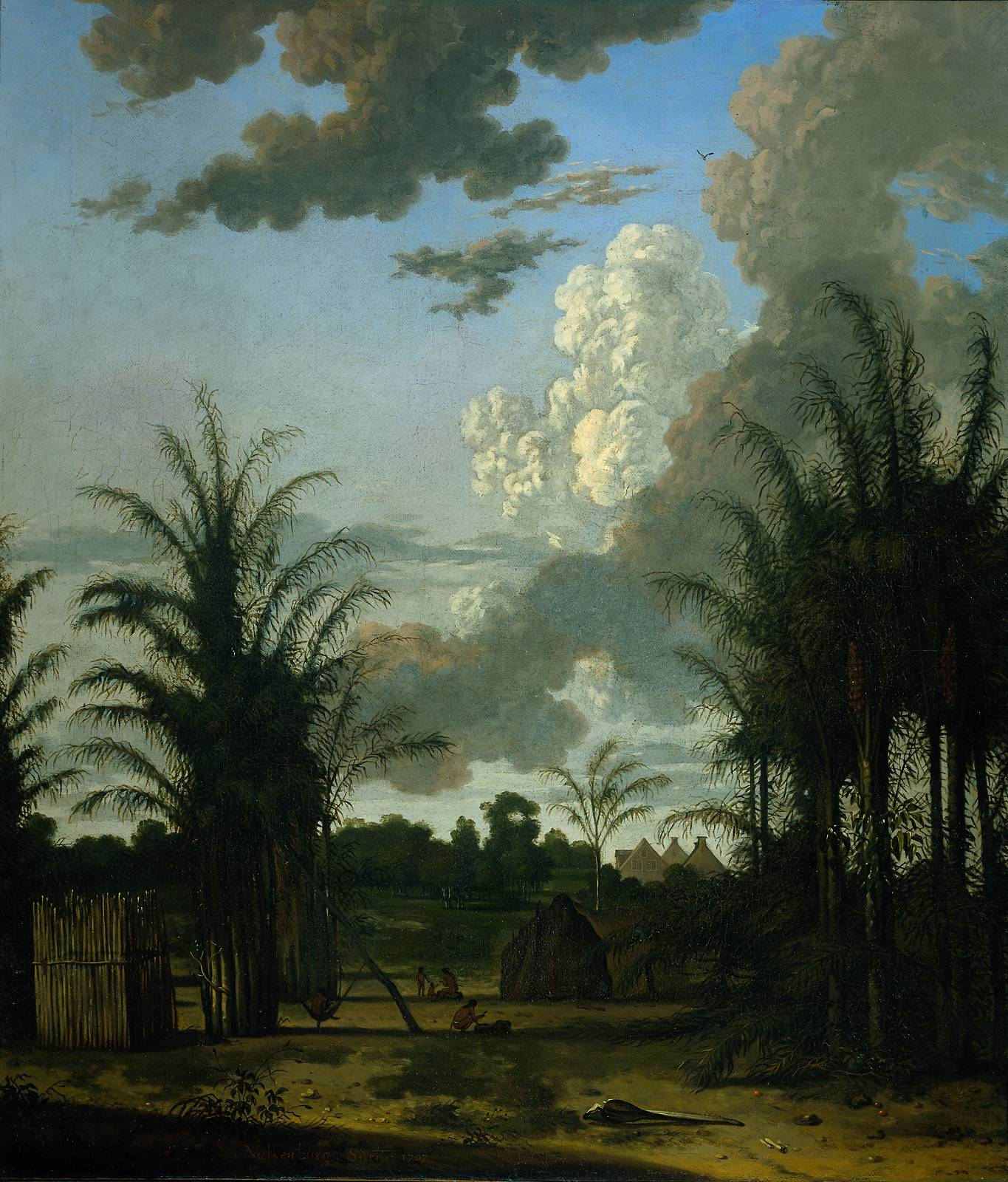
Valkenburg – A Plantation in Suriname, the earliest known painting of this Dutch colony

== Paintings ==
- Michael Dahl – Portrait of Sir William Whetstone (probable date)
- Andrea Pozzo – Admittance of Hercules to Olympus (trompe-l'œil painting on ceiling of Liechtenstein Garden Palace, Vienna)
- Francesco Solimena – Portrait of Charles III of Habsburg
- Dirk Valkenburg – A Plantation in Suriname
- Willem van de Velde the Younger – The Gust

== Births ==
- January 11 – Giuseppe Bonito, Neapolitan painter of the Rococo period (died 1789)
- January 28 (bapt.) – John Baskerville, typographer and craftsman (died 1775)
- February 27 – Joseph Johann Kauffmann, Austrian painter of portraits, church decorations, and castle depictions (died 1782)
- March 2 – Louis-Michel van Loo, French painter (died 1771)
- May 21 – Francisco Salzillo, Spanish sculptor (died 1781)
- July 8 – Jacques-Philippe Le Bas, French engraver (died 1783)
- September 30 – Pietro Rotari, Italian painter of portraits and altarpieces (died 1762)
- date unknown
  - Joseph Badger, American portrait artist (died 1765)
  - Jean-Bernard, abbé Le Blanc, French art critic and director of the official French policy in the arts (died 1781)
  - William Hoare, English painter, noted for his pastels (died 1792)
  - Sim Sa-jeong, Korean genre painter in the style of the Joseon period (died 1769)
  - Maria Felice Tibaldi, Italian painter of portraits and historical subjects (died 1770)

== Deaths ==
- February 16 – Hendrik Bary, Dutch engraver (born 1632)
- February 22 – Giacinto Calandrucci, Italian painter at the studio of Carlo Maratta (born 1646)
- April 2 – Gerard Edelinck, Flemish copper-plate engraver (born 1649)
- April 6 – Willem van de Velde the Younger, Dutch marine painter (born 1633)
- June 15 – Antonio Verrio, Italian painter of murals, altarpieces, master gardener, active mainly in England (born c. 1636)
- October 1 – Pierre Le Ber, portrait painter from Montreal (born 1669)
- December 24 – Noël Coypel, French painter (born 1628)
- date unknown
  - Bernard Lens I, Dutch painter and writer of religious treatises (born c. 1631)
  - Alessandro Mari, Italian painter of capricci and symbolical representations (born 1650)
