= 1716 in art =

List of years in art	(table)
- … 1706; 1707; 1708; 1709; 1710; 1711; 1712; 1713; 1714; 1715; 1716; 1717; 1718; 1719; 1720; 1721; 1722; 1723; 1724; 1725; 1726 …
- Art; Archaeology; Architecture; Literature; Music; Philosophy; Science; +...

Events from the year 1716 in art.

== Events ==
- A sculpture park begins to be established in the Summer Garden at Saint Petersburg, Russia.

== Paintings ==
- Sir Godfrey Kneller – Portrait of Caroline of Brandenburg-Ansbach, Princess of Wales
- James Thornhill – hall ceiling at Blenheim Palace, Oxfordshire
- Adriaen van der Werff – The Judgement of Paris (approximate date)

== Births ==
- March 19 – Guillaume Coustou the Younger, painter (died 1777)
- March 25 – Alexei Antropov, Russian barocco painter (died 1795)
- April 5 – Jeremiah Theus, Swiss-born American painter, primarily of portraits (died 1774)
- June 18 – Joseph-Marie Vien, French painter (died 1809)
- December 1 – Étienne Maurice Falconet, French Rococo sculptor (died 1791)
- date unknown
  - Fedor Leontyevich Argunov, Russian painter (died 1754)
  - Yosa Buson, Japanese poet and painter from the Edo period (died 1784)
  - Jacques Fabien Gautier d'Agoty, French painter and printmaker (died 1785)
  - Luis Egidio Meléndez, Spanish still-life painter (died 1780)
  - Johann Georg Ziesenis, German-Danish portrait painter (died 1776)
- probable
  - Bartolomeo Cavaceppi, Italian sculptor who worked in Rome (died 1799)
  - Christian Ulrik Foltmar, Danish wallpaper weaver, painter of miniatures and organist (died 1794)

== Deaths ==
- February 3 – Giuseppe Alberti, Italian painter (born 1664)
- March 15 - Gilliam van der Gouwen, Flemish engraver (born 1657)
- March 22 – Philippe Lallemand, French portrait painter (born 1636)
- April 23 – Justus van Huysum, Dutch Golden Age flower painter (born 1659)
- June 2 – Ogata Kōrin, Japanese painter and lacquerer (born 1658)
- August 5 – Teresa del Po, Italian painter and engraver (born 1649)
- September 19 – Louis Du Guernier, French engraver (born 1677)
- November 16 – Pierre Lepautre, French ornemaniste (designer of ornament) and engraver (born 1648)
- December 13 – Charles de La Fosse, French painter (born 1640)
- December 18 – Jan Van Cleef, Flemish painter (born 1646)
- date unknown
  - Philippe Caffieri, Italian decorative sculptor (born 1634)
  - Giovanni Canti, Italian painter (born 1650)
  - Juan Correa, Mexican painter of primarily religious themes (born 1646)
  - Stefano Erardi, Maltese painter (born 1630)
  - Garret Morphy, Irish painter of portraits, genre scenes and landscapes (born 1650)
  - Sante Vandi, Italian portrait painter (born 1653)
