= Foltmar =

Foltmar is a surname. Notable people with the surname include:

- Christian Ulrik Foltmar (c.1716–1794), Danish wallpaper weaver, painter, and organist
- Christoffer Foltmar (1718–1759), Danish painter and organist, brother of Christian and Johan
- Johan Foltmar (1714–1794), Danish composer
