= 1711 in art =

Events from the year 1711 in art.

== Events ==
- October 16 – Académie Royale des Beaux-Arts established in Brussels.
- Fresco of c.1480 by Melozzo da Forlì in Santi Apostoli, Rome, dismembered and distributed to other locations in the city.

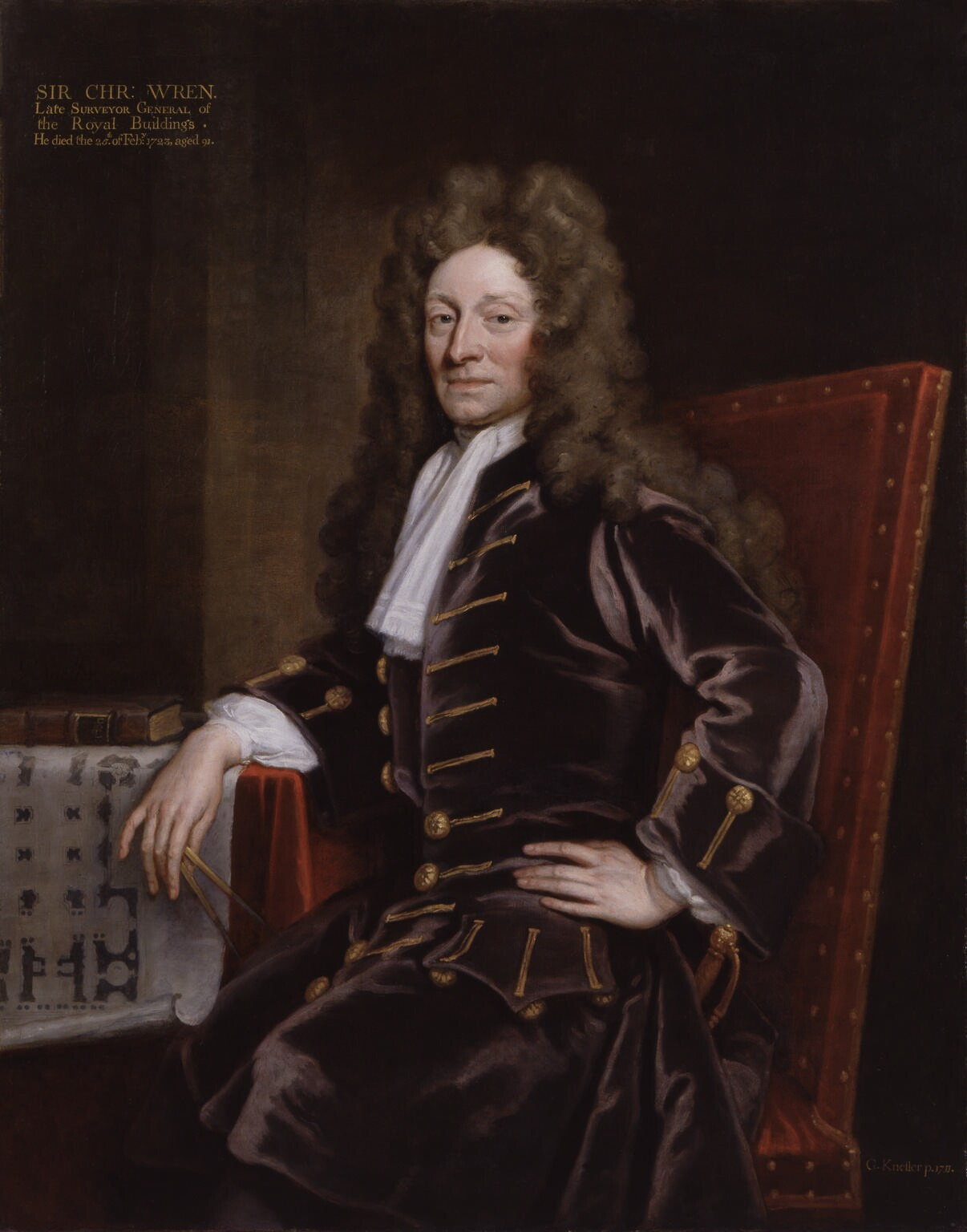
Portrait of Sir Christopher Wren by Godfrey Kneller.

== Paintings ==
- Manuel Arellano paints the earliest prototypes of the casta genre works.
- Sir Godfrey Kneller paints Sir Christopher Wren.
- Sebastiano Ricci paints Esther before Ahasuerus and Moses saved from the waters

== Births ==
- January 28 – Johan Hörner, Swedish-Danish painter (died 1763)
- March 5 – Carl Gustaf Pilo, Swedish-born artist and painter (died 1793)
- September 2 – Noël Hallé, French painter, draftsman and printmaker (died 1781)
- November 19 – Mikhail Lomonosov, Russian polymath, scientist and writer, and mosaic artist (died 1765)
- date unknown – Jacopo Marieschi, Italian vedute painter (died 1794)
- probable
  - Prince Hoare, English sculptor (died 1769)
  - Miguel Posadas, Spanish painter (died 1753)
  - Erik Westzynthius the Elder, Finnish painter (died 1757)
  - Giuseppe Zocchi, Italian veduta painter and printmaker (died 1767)

== Deaths ==
- January 24 – Jean Bérain the Elder, French draughtsman and designer, painter and engraver (born 1640)
- May 14 – Juan Conchillos Falco, Spanish painter (born 1641)
- May 24 (bur.) – John Closterman, Westphalian portrait painter (born 1660)
- June ? – Gerard de Lairesse, Dutch Golden Age painter and art theorist (born 1641)
- December 18 – Louis de Deyster, Flemish painter (born 1656)
- date unknown
  - Étienne Baudet, French engraver (born 1636)
  - Maria Vittoria Cassana, Italian painter of the late-Baroque (date of birth unknown)
  - Francisco de Artiga, Spanish landscape and historical painter (born 1650)
  - Francisco Leonardoni, Italian painter active mainly in Spain (born 1654)
  - Jerzy Siemiginowski-Eleuter, Polish painter and engraver (born 1660)
  - Domenico Maria Viani, Italian painter of churches, born in Bologna (born 1668)
