= Boy and Rabbit =

Painting by Henry Raeburn

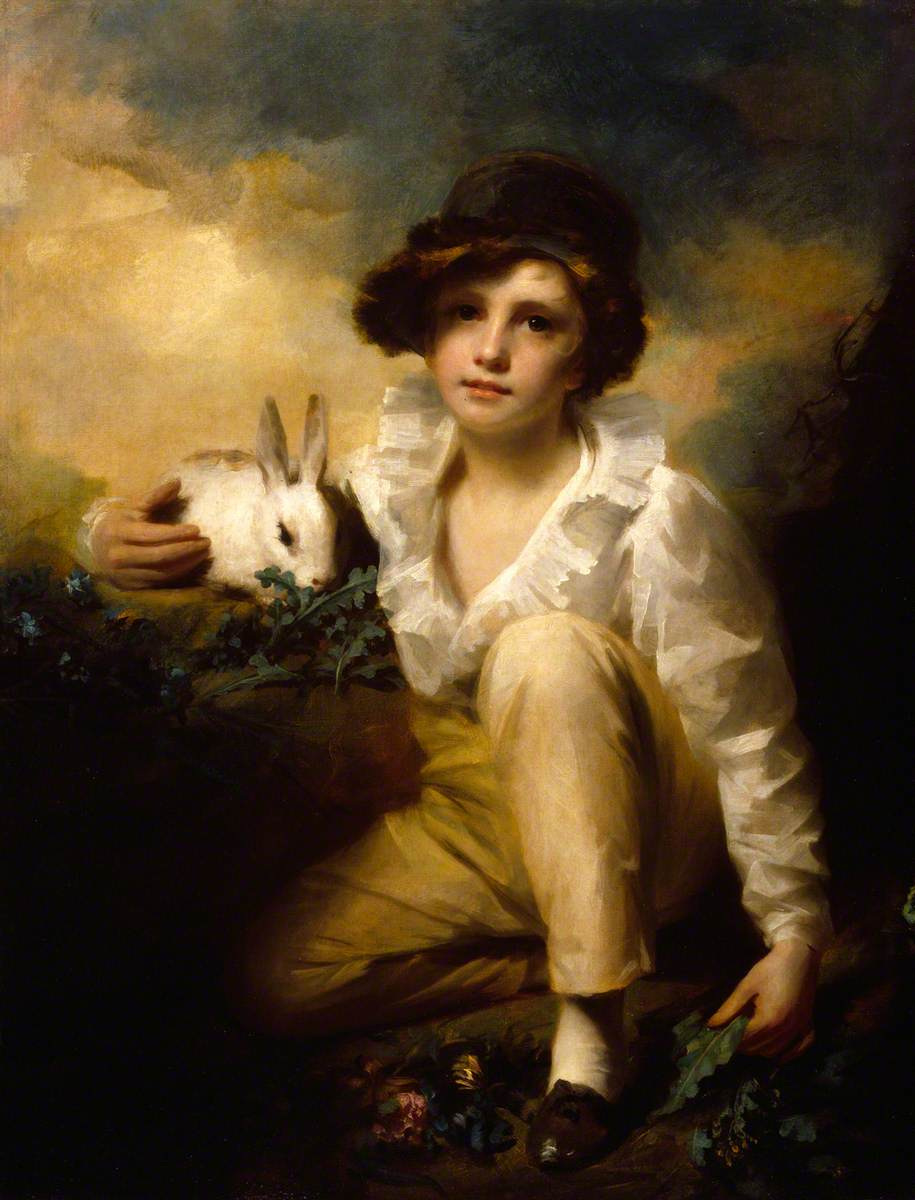
- Artist: Henry Raeburn
- Year: 1814
- Type: Oil on canvas, fancy picture
- Dimensions: 103 cm × 79.3 cm (41 in × 31.2 in)
- Location: Royal Academy of Arts; London

Boy and Rabbit is an 1814 oil painting by the British artist Henry Raeburn. It is a fancy picture depicting a boy with a rabbit. The sitter was Henry Raeburn Inglis, the son of Raeburn's stepdaughter, who is seen protectively clutching his pet rabbit and feeding it dandelion leaves.

Raeburn was a prominent Scottish portrait painter of the Regency era. Although he had not formally canvassed for the election for membership of the Royal Academy in London, other figures such as Thomas Lawrence had done so on his behalf and he became a full member. This required him to submit a diploma work to the academy and as the rules forbade portraits, he submitted this fancy picture as his donation. It was a tradition that stretched back to the eighteenth century with figures such as Thomas Gainsborough and Joshua Reynolds as well as Lawrence's own diploma piece A Gipsy Girl in 1794.

== Bibliography ==
- Brotchie, Theodore Charles Ferdinand. Henry Raeburn, 1756–1823. Cassell, 1924.
- Coltman, Viccy. Henry Raeburn: Context, Reception and Reputation. Edinburgh University Press, 2019.
