= Baldassari =

Baldassari is a surname. Notable people with this surname include:

- Butch Baldassari (1952–2009), American mandolinist, recording artist, composer, and music teacher
- Carlos Baldassari (born 1979), Uruguayan former rugby union player
- Filippo Baldassari (born 1988), Italian sailor
- Jean Baldassari (1925–2018), French racing cyclist
- Maurizio Baldassari, Italian menswear brand
- Roberto Baldassari (born 1972), retired Swiss football midfielder
- Valerio Baldassari, Italian painter
