= 1695 in art =

Events from the year 1695 in art.

== Events ==
- French painter Évrard Chauveau travels to Sweden to work on the palaces of Queen Ulrike Eleonora.
- François Girardon becomes "chancelier" of the Académie Royale de Peinture et de Sculpture.

== Paintings ==
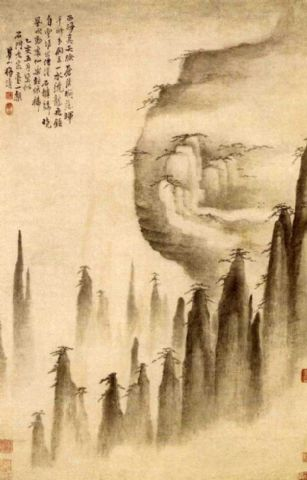
Mei Qing – Two Immortals on Huangshan

- Ludolf Bakhuizen – Warships in a Heavy Storm
- Mei Qing – Two Immortals on Huangshan
- Sebastiano Ricci – Phineas and the Sons of Boreas
- Hyacinthe Rigaud
  - Christ Atoning on the Cross (two versions)
  - Portrait of the Artist's mother (Musée du Louvre)
- Godfried Schalcken – Self-Portrait by Candlelight

== Births ==
- May 2 – Giovanni Niccolò Servandoni, French architect and painter (died 1766)
- June 24 – Martin van Meytens, Austrian portrait painter (died 1770)
- August 11 – Michelangelo Unterberger, Austrian painter of religious themes (died 1758)
- December 19 – Andrea Locatelli, Italian painter of landscapes (vedute) (died 1741)
- December 29 – Jean-Baptiste Pater, French rococo painter (died 1736)
- date unknown
  - François Boch, ceramicist, co-founder of Villeroy & Boch (died 1794)
  - Miguel Cabrera, indigenous Zapotec painter, (died 1768)
  - Elias Gottlob Haussmann, German painter (died 1774)
  - Juste-Aurèle Meissonnier, French goldsmith, sculptor, painter, architect, and furniture designer (died 1750)
  - Johan Ross the Elder, Swedish painter (died 1773)
- probable
  - Francesco Pavona, Italian painter primarily of pastel portraits (died 1777)
  - Louis-François Roubiliac, French sculptor (died 1762)

== Deaths ==
- January 16 – Hans Adam Weissenkircher, Austrian Baroque court painter (born 1646)
- April 3 – Melchior d'Hondecoeter, Dutch painter of exotic birds in a park-like landscape (born 1636)
- April 12 – Jean-Baptiste Corneille, French painter, etcher, and engraver (born 1646)
- May – Cornelis de Heem, still-life painter associated with both Flemish Baroque and Dutch Golden Age painting (born 1631)
- May 9 – Lambert van Haven, Danish painter, architect and master builder (born 1630)
- May 29 – Giuseppe Recco, Italian painter (born 1634)
- May 30 – Pierre Mignard, French painter (born 1605)
- August 8 – Carel de Vogelaer, Dutch still life painter (born 1653)
- date unknown
  - Fabrizio Chiari, painter and engraver (born 1621)
  - Jean-Gilles Delcour, Flemish religious painter (born 1632)
  - Enkū, Japanese Buddhist monk and sculptor during the early Edo period (born 1632)
  - Henri Testelin, French court painter (born 1616)
- probable
  - Valerio Baldassari, Italian painter (born 1650)
  - Jan Thopas, Dutch portraitist (born 1627)
