= Johan Voltmar =

Johan Voltmar (c. 1685 – ?) was a German musician and composer, who lived in Copenhagen, Denmark–Norway from c. 1711, together with his family. Voltmar was married to Anne Margretlie Elisabeth Voltmar, who also possessed artistic talent. Together, they had at least 3 daughters and 4 sons, who also were accomplished artists.

Voltmar was presumably an oboist in the Grenadier regiment, but later became a royal violinist at the Royal Danish Orchestra. The parents homeschooled their children, and the two eldest sons, Herman Friedrich Voltmar and Johan Foltmar both became professional musicians. The two youngest, Christian Ulrik Foltmar and Christoffer Foltmar were artists.

Johan Voltmar's compositions include a flute sonata and a concert for four flutes, 2 violins and double bass.

== See also ==
- List of Danish composers
