= My First Sermon =

Painting by John Everett Millais

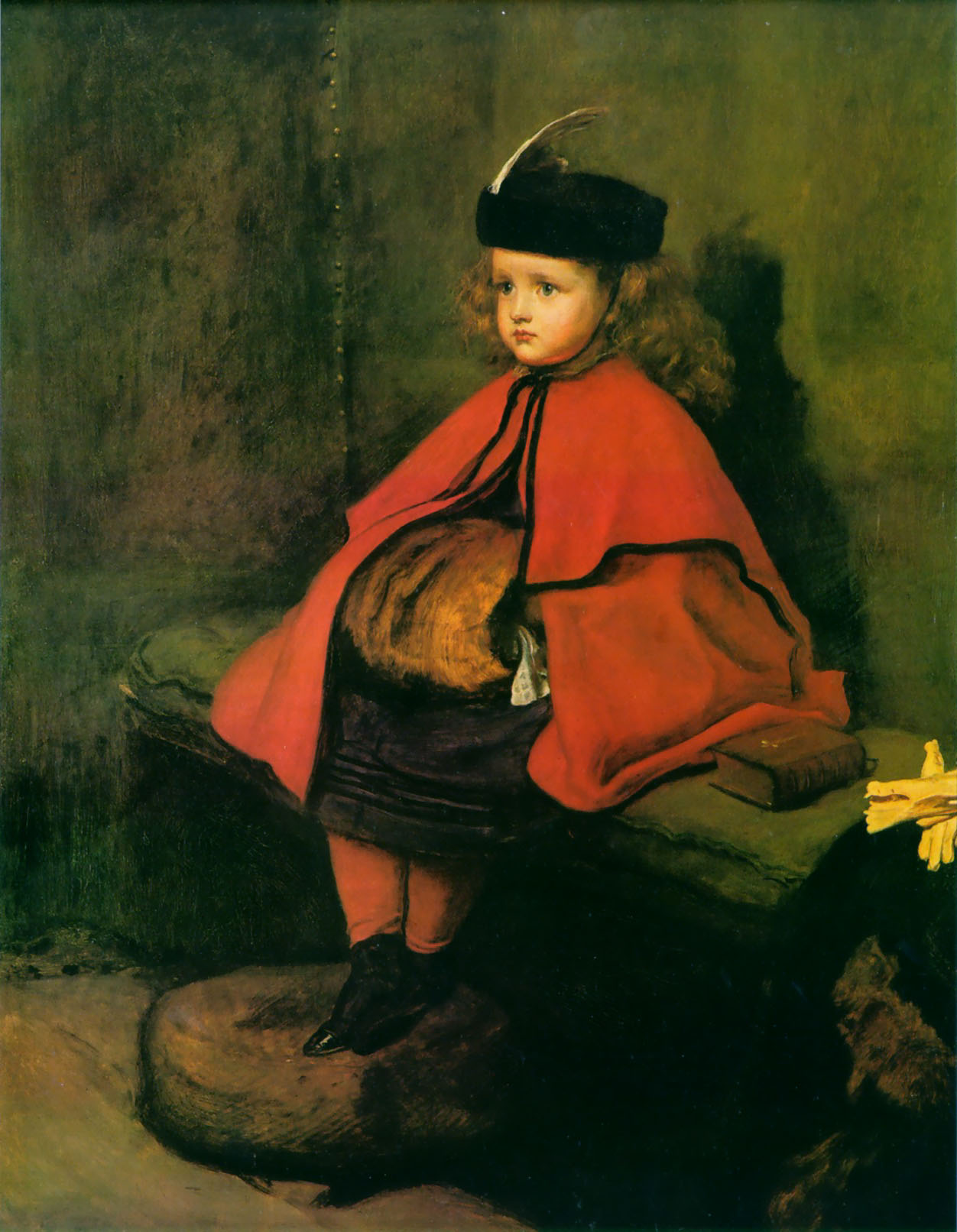
- Artist: John Everett Millais
- Year: 1863
- Type: Oil on canvas, genre painting
- Dimensions: 97 cm × 77 cm (38 in × 30 in)
- Location: Guildhall Art Gallery, London

My First Sermon is an 1863 oil painting by the British artist John Everett Millais. A fancy picture, it depicts a young girl listening intently to a sermon in church for the first time. Millais used his own daughter Effie as the model.

The work was displayed at the Royal Academy Exhibition of 1863 at the National Gallery where it was well received. On the strength of the painting, along with The Eve of St Agnes, Millais was elected to full membership of the Royal Academy of Arts. Today the picture is in the Guildhall Art Gallery in the City of London, having been bequeathed by the art collector Charles Gassiot in 1902.

Millais produced a sequel My Second Sermon in 1864 which Gassiot also donated to the Guildhall.

== See also ==
- List of paintings by John Everett Millais

== Bibliography ==
- Douglas-Fairhurst, Robert. The Story of Alice: Lewis Carroll and the Secret History of Wonderland. Harvard University Press, 2015.
- Riding, Christine. John Everett Millais. Harry N. Abrams, 2006.
- Tanabe, Kumiko (ed.) The Interconnections Between Victorian Writers, Artists and Places. Cambridge Scholars Publishing, 2019.
