= Herman Friedrich Voltmar =

Danish composer

Herman Friedrich Voltmar (1707 – 6 May 1782) was a Danish composer.

He was the eldest son of oboist Johan Voltmar. The family moved to Denmark around 1711. His three brothers were also artists: composer Johan Foltmar, and painters Christian Ulrik Foltmar and Christoffer Foltmar.

At a young age, he was employed by the crown prince and later by Christian VI in 1738 as a musician in the Royal Chapel. In addition to his permanent salary, he received extra pay, suggesting he also served as a soloist in more private court settings. He also composed music and wrote poetry. For the wedding of the crown prince (later King Frederik V), Voltmar wrote a lengthy epic in German.

In 1770, at the age of 63, Voltmar was dismissed from the Royal Chapel.

== See also ==
- List of Danish composers
