= Christoffer Foltmar =

Danish painter

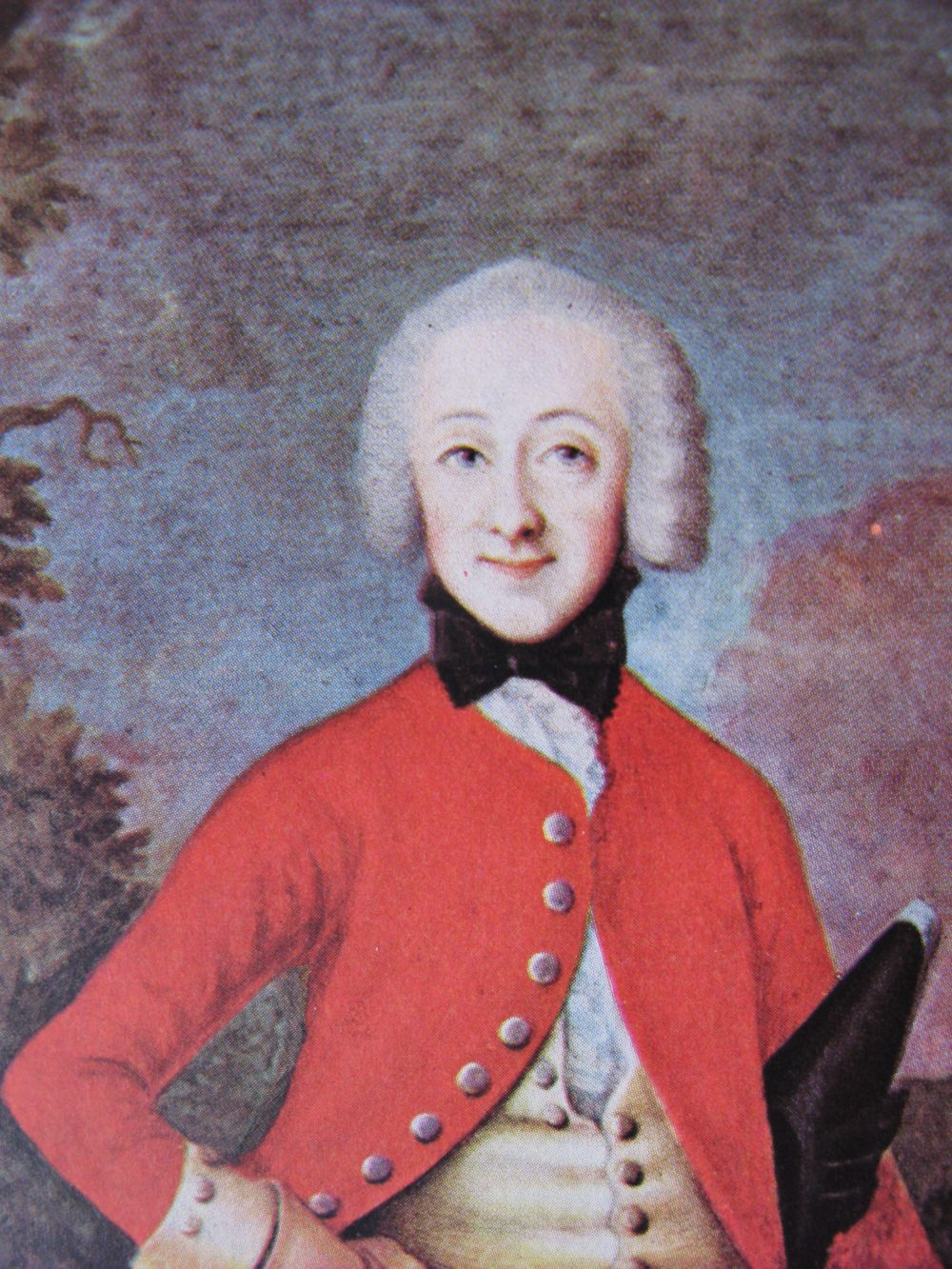
Portrait of Count Hannibal Wedell-Wedellsborg by Christoffer Foltmar, 1751

Christoffer Foltmar (17 October 1718 – 4 April 1759) was a Danish painter of miniatures and organist.

== Early life ==
Foltmar was the son of musician Johan Voltmar, and he was the brother of composers Herman Friedrich Voltmar, Johan Foltmar, and painter Christian Ulrik Foltmar. He trained both in music and painting and was the pupil of Jacob Fosie in both areas, who was the painter and organist at the Church of Holmen. Foltmar later specialized in miniature painting in watercolor and enamel.

== Music ==
In 1739 he became the organist at Vajsenhus, whose organ he and his brother Johan reportedly single-handedly newly built. Vajsenhus organists were poorly paid and Foltmar was promised to follow his mentor Fosie as organist at the Church of Holmen. However Foltmar died first and therefore did not get the coveted office.

== Painting ==
His main work was miniature painting. His clients were the royal family, which had close links with the Voltmar/Foltmar family, and also other members of the court and many of the city rich people of the royal court. He was appointed the official miniature painter in 1749 and provided a large number of thumbnails in the enamel of the royal family's snuff boxes, jewelry and other small items. At the same time he was also the drawing teacher for King Frederick V of Denmark's children.

== Notes ==
- Dansk biografisk Lexikon 1905 to 1979
