= Giovanni Battista Galestruzzi =

Italian painter

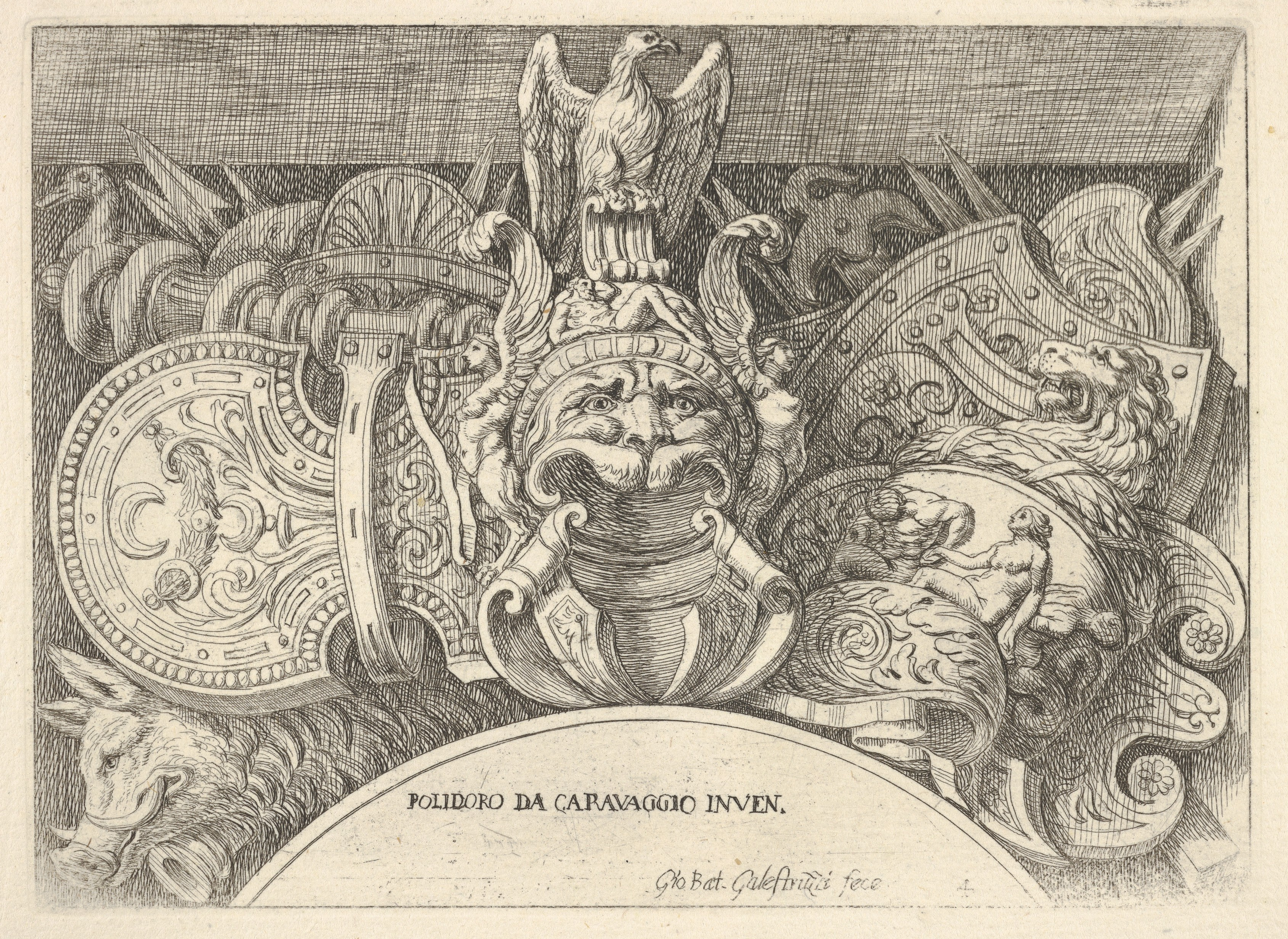
Trophies of Roman arms from decorations above the windows on the second floor of the Palazzo Milesi in Rome by Galestruzzi

Giovanni Battista Galestruzzi (1618–1677) was an Italian painter and etcher of the Baroque period. Born in Florence, he was a pupil of the painter Francesco Furini, then moved to Rome, where he joined the Accademia di San Luca in 1652. He was an accomplished etcher and produced works for Leonardo Agostini’s book 'Le gemme antiche figurate' (1657–1659). The Roman Baroque painter and engraver Giovanni Francesco Venturini was probably his pupil.
