= 1710 in art =

Events from the year 1710 in art.

== Paintings ==
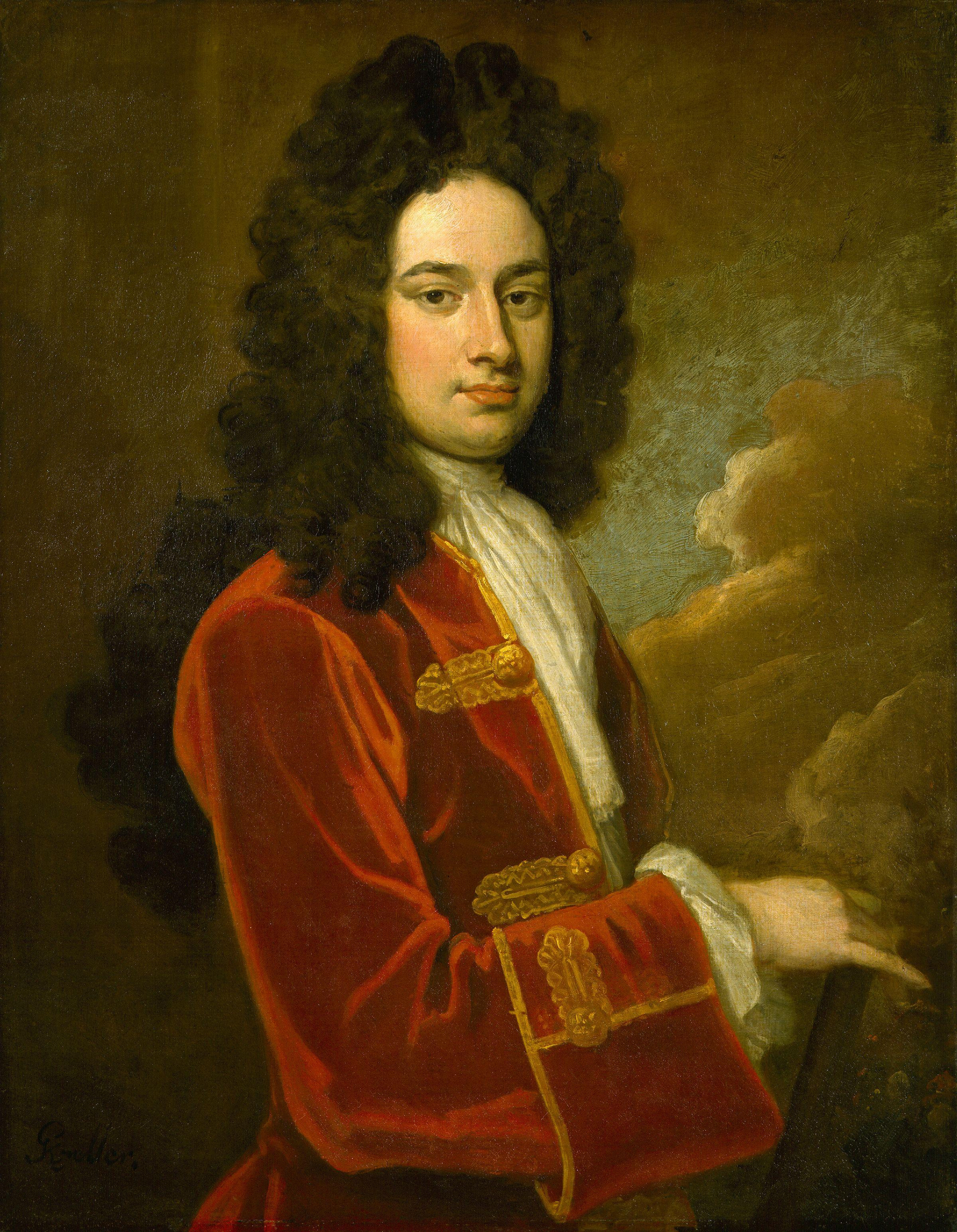
Portrait of James Stanhope by Godfrey Kneller

- John James Baker – The Whig Junto
- Aert de Gelder – The Baptism of Christ (Fitzwilliam Museum, Cambridge) (approximate date)
- Thomas Gibson – Portrait of Henry Sacheverell
- Godfrey Kneller
  - Portrait of Admiral George Delaval MP
  - Portrait of James Stanhope
- Antoine Pesne – Portrait of Margrave Christian Ludwig of Brandenburg-Schwedt
- Sebastiano Ricci (Bergamo)
  - Assumption
  - Call of Saint Peter
  - Christ delivers the keys to Saint Peter
  - Liberation of Saint Peter
- John Verelst – Four Mohawk Kings

== Births ==
- March 4 – Aert Schouman, Dutch painter, glass engraver and art dealer (died 1792)
- March 8 – Gaetano Majorano, Italian castrato and opera singer (died 1783)
- May 8 – Peter Anton von Verschaffelt, Flemish sculptor and architect (died 1793)
- May 23 – François Gaspard Adam, French rococo sculptor (died 1781)
- August 22 – Johann August Nahl, German sculptor and stucco artist (died 1781)
- August 27 – Giuseppe Vasi, Italian artist (died 1782)
- September 3 – Abraham Trembley, Swiss naturalist and zoological artist (died 1784)
- October 4 – Count Augustin Ehrensvärd, Swedish military architect and painter (died 1772)
- October 11 – Christophe-Gabriel Allegrain, French sculptor in the neoclassical style (died 1795)
- December 15 – Francesco Zahra, Maltese painter (died 1773)
- date unknown
  - Pierre-Charles Canot, French engraver who spent most of his career in England (died 1777)
  - Francesco Foschi, Italian landscape painter (died 1780)
  - Yi Insang, Korean painter and government officer in the late Joseon period (died 1760)
  - José Luzán, Spanish Baroque painter (died 1785)
  - Michele Marieschi, Italian painter of landscapes or vistas (a vedutisti) (died 1743)
  - Tibout Regters, Dutch portrait painter (died 1768)
  - Jean Valade, French painter (died 1787)
  - Yi Insang, Korean painter of the later Joseon period (died 1760)
- probable
  - Jean Baptiste Claude Chatelain, French engraver (died 1771)
  - Georg Franz Ebenhech, German sculptor (died 1757)
  - Marcos Zapata, Peruvian Quechua painter (died 1773)

== Deaths ==
- January 30 – Madeleine Boullogne, French painter (born 1646)
- September 20 – Margherita Caffi, Italian woman painter of still life (born 1650)
- September 21 – Joseph Werner, Swiss miniaturist (born 1637)
- October 5 – John Baptist Medina, Flemish-Spanish portrait painter and illustrator of Paradise Lost (born 1659)
- date unknown
  - Germain Audran, French engraver (born 1631)
  - Giovanni Antonio Fumiani, Italian painter (born 1645)
  - Heinrich Charasky, Hungarian sculptor (born 1656)
  - Jacob Leyssens, Flemish painter and decorator from the Baroque (born 1661)
  - Basilio Santa Cruz Pumacallao, Quechua painter from Cusco, Peru (born 1635)
  - Johann Gustav Stockenberg, Swedish sculptor and stonemason (born 1660)
  - Sebastiano Taricco, Italian painter (born 1645)
  - Anna Maria Thelott, Swedish engraver, illustrator, woodcut-artist, and miniaturist painter (born 1683)
  - Girolamo Troppa, Italian painter (born 1637)
  - Giovanni Francesco Venturini, Italian painter and engraver (born 1650)
  - Simon Pietersz Verelst, Dutch Golden Age painter (born 1644)
  - Giuseppe Zimbalo, Italian architect and sculptor (born 1617)
  - 1710/1715: Jean Cornu, French sculptor (born 1650)
