= Romulus of Fiesole =

Roman Catholic saint

Saint Romulus of Fiesole
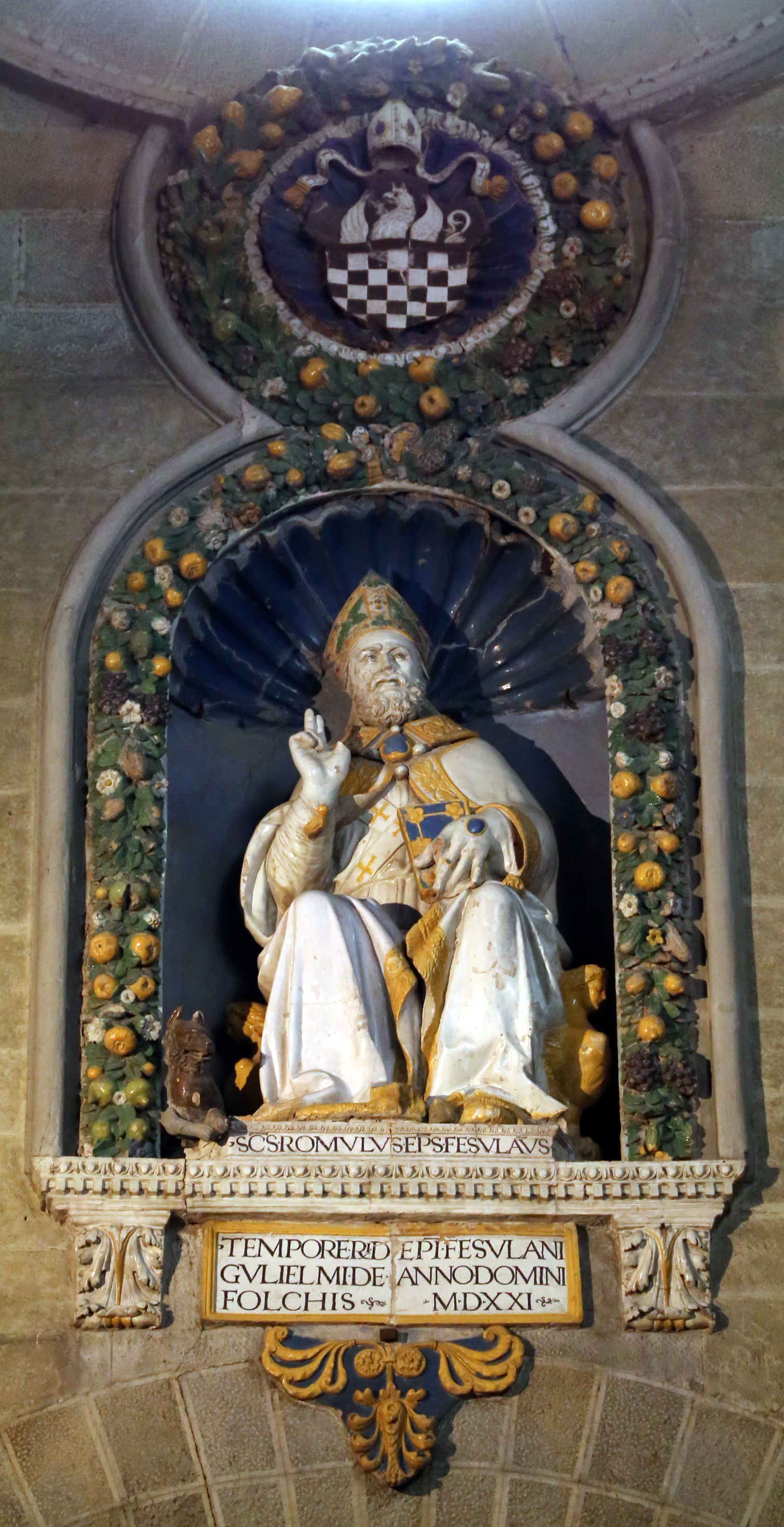
- Statue of Saint Romulus in the Fiesole Cathedral by Giovanni della Robbia
- Died: c. 90 AD
- Venerated in: Roman Catholic Church, Eastern Orthodox Church
- Major shrine: Fiesole Cathedral
- Feast: 6 July (Catholic Church), 6 June (Orthodox Church)
- Attributes: depicted with a wolf due to confusion with the legend of Romulus and Remus; bishop with an arrow broken above his breast; depicted at martyrdom of 4 companions or enthroned among four martyrs
- Patronage: Fiesole

Saint Romulus of Fiesole (Italian: San Romolo, died c. AD 90) was bishop of Fiesole during the 1st century. He is venerated as the patron saint of Fiesole, Italy. Romulus was probably a local deacon, priest, or bishop of the 1st century.

According to tradition, he was a disciple of Saint Peter and had been converted to Christianity by the apostle. This tradition states that Romulus became the first bishop of Fiesole and was martyred during the reign of Domitian along with four companions: Carissimus, Dulcissimus, Marchis(i)anus, and Crescentius.

He was not named as a bishop or martyr in documents dating from 966; however, a document from 1028 names him as such. From then on, Romulus was considered a martyred bishop of Fiesole, and his companions were named as Carissimus, Dulcissimus, Marchis(i)anus (Marchiziano), and Crescentius. Their feast day was listed as 6 July in the 1468 Florentine edition of the Martyrology of Usuard, and in the 16th century, his name began to appear in the Roman Martyrology, where he was named as a disciple of Saint Peter.

As Antonio Borrelli remarks, sometime between the end of the 10th century and the beginning of the eleventh, Romulus was "upgraded" from being considered a Confessor of the Faith to a martyr, possibly by a local abbot named Teuzo.

An 11th-century legend associated with him, considered "worthless", makes him an illegitimate son of a woman named Lucerna, who had a child with her father's slave, who was named Cyrus. Like the Romulus of ancient Roman legend, this Romulus was also abandoned and suckled by a she-wolf. He was captured, baptized and raised by Saint Peter and Peter's companion Justin. Romulus then evangelized much of central Italy and was put to death by the governor Repertian.

The most ancient image depicting Romulus is a 1440 triptych in Fiesole Cathedral by Bicci di Lorenzo, where he is represented with Saints Alexander, Peter and Donatus. Also in the cathedral is a collection of frescoes by Nicodemo Ferrucci adorning the vault of the apse which depict scenes from the life of Saint Romulus.

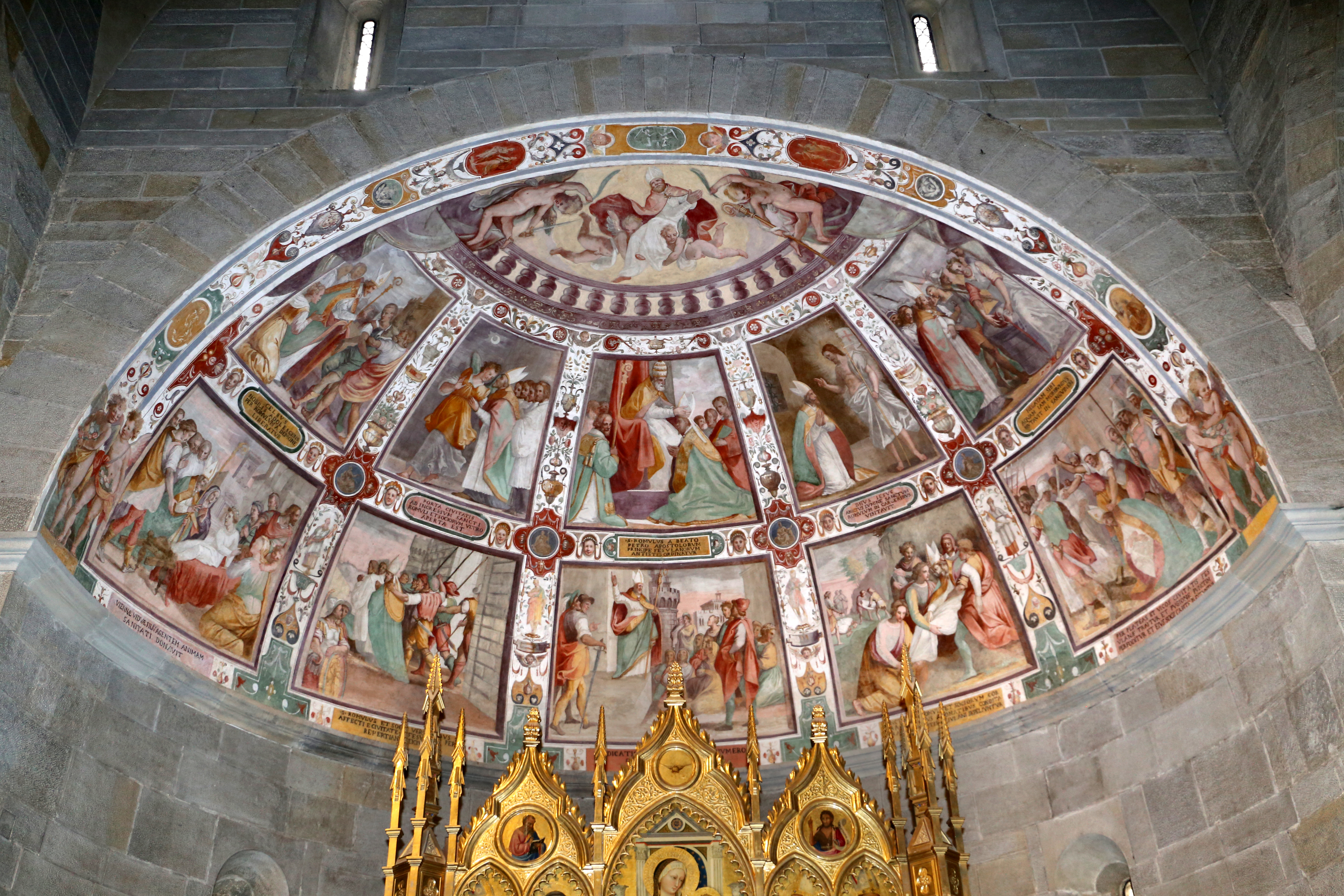
Stories of St. Romulus in the Fiesole Cathedral

== Books ==
- Gattolini, Jacopo (1745). Documenti per la vera istoria di San Romolo Vescovo, Martire e Protettore della Città di Fiesole (in Italian). Venezia: Giambattista Pasquali.
- Gattolini, Jacopo Nicola (1751). Dissertazione seconda con nuovi documenti per la vera istoria di santo Romolo vescovo, martire, e protettore della città di Fiesole data nuovamente in luce da Jacopo Niccola Gattolini fiorentino accademico colombario (in Italian). per Bartolomeo Soliani stampator ducale.
- Rauty, Natale (2000). Il culto dei santi a Pistoia nel Medioevo (in Italian). Tavarnuzze (Firenze): SISMEL edizioni del Galluzzo. p. 298. ISBN 9788884500090.
- Soldani, Fedele (1742). Terza lettera del m. r. p. maestro don Fedele Soldani vallombrosano scritta ad un suo amico in risposta alla scrittura intitolata La vera istoria di s. Romolo vescovo e protettore della città di Fiesole liberata dal dottore Pier Francesco Foggini dalle calunnie appostele in una scrittura pubblicata per difesa degli atti di detto santo apocrifi e alla gloriosa memoria di lui ingiuriosissimi (in Italian).
- Verrando, Giovanni Nino (2000). "I due leggendari di Fiesole". Aevum. 74 (2): 443–491. JSTOR 20861081.
