= Yi Insang =

Korean painter (1710–1760)

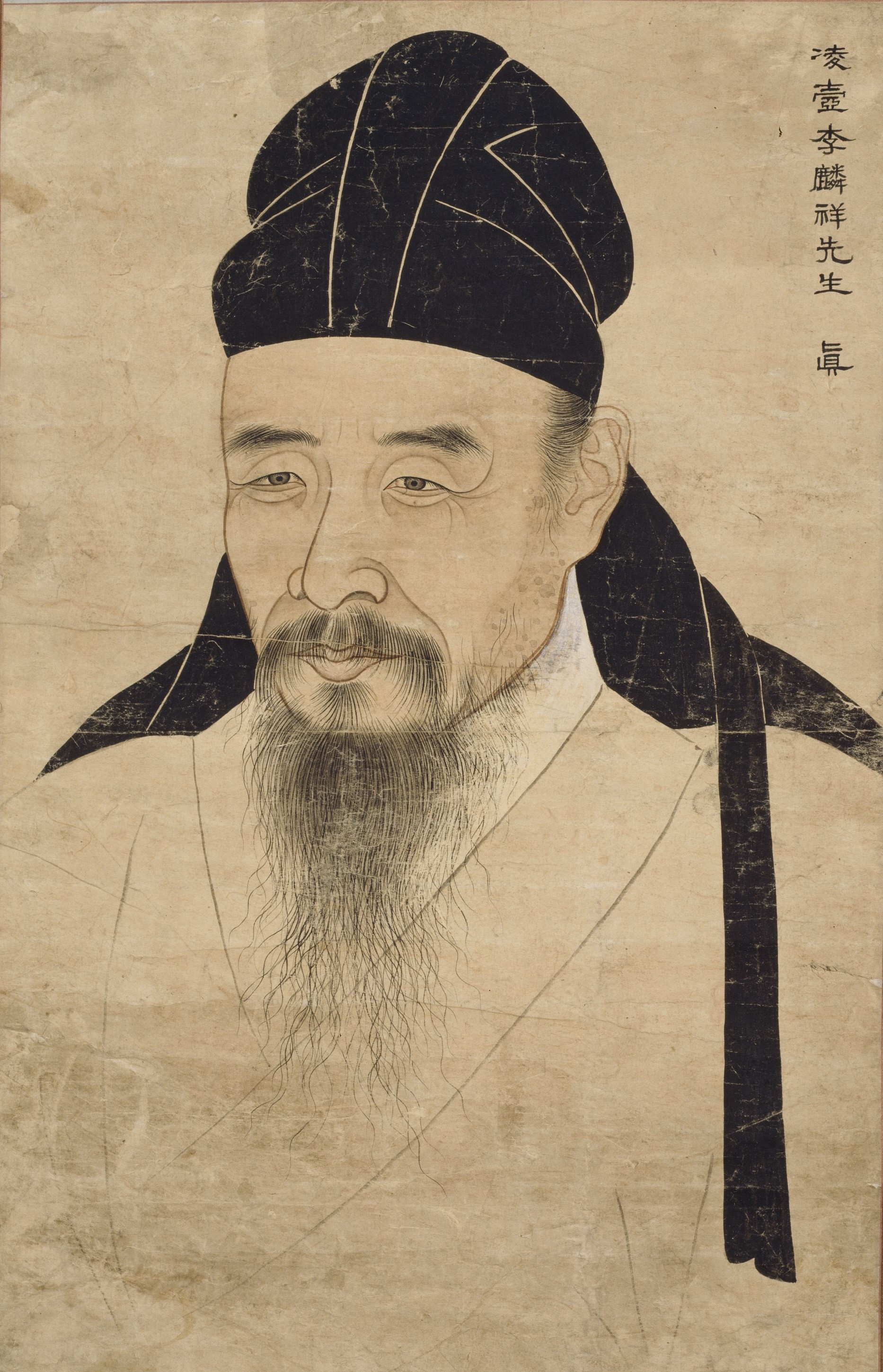

Korean name
- Hangul: 이인상
- Hanja: 李麟祥
- RR: I Insang
- MR: I Insang

Art name
- Hangul: 능호관, 보산자
- Hanja: 凌壺觀, 寶山子
- RR: Neunghogwan, Bosanja
- MR: Nŭnghogwan, Posanja

Courtesy name
- Hangul: 원령
- Hanja: 元靈
- RR: Wonryeong
- MR: Wŏllyŏng

Yi Insang (Korean: 이인상; 1710–1760) was a painter and a government officer in the late Joseon period.

Yi was born to a high class and grandson of Yi Gyeongyeo who served as Yeonguijeong (prime minister). He worked as a government officer, Hyeongam of Eumjuk. At 42, Yi retired from the government officer and devoted to painting, poetry and calligraphy.

== See also ==
- Korean painting
- List of Korean painters
- Korean art
- Korean culture
