= Jean-Bernard, abbé Le Blanc =

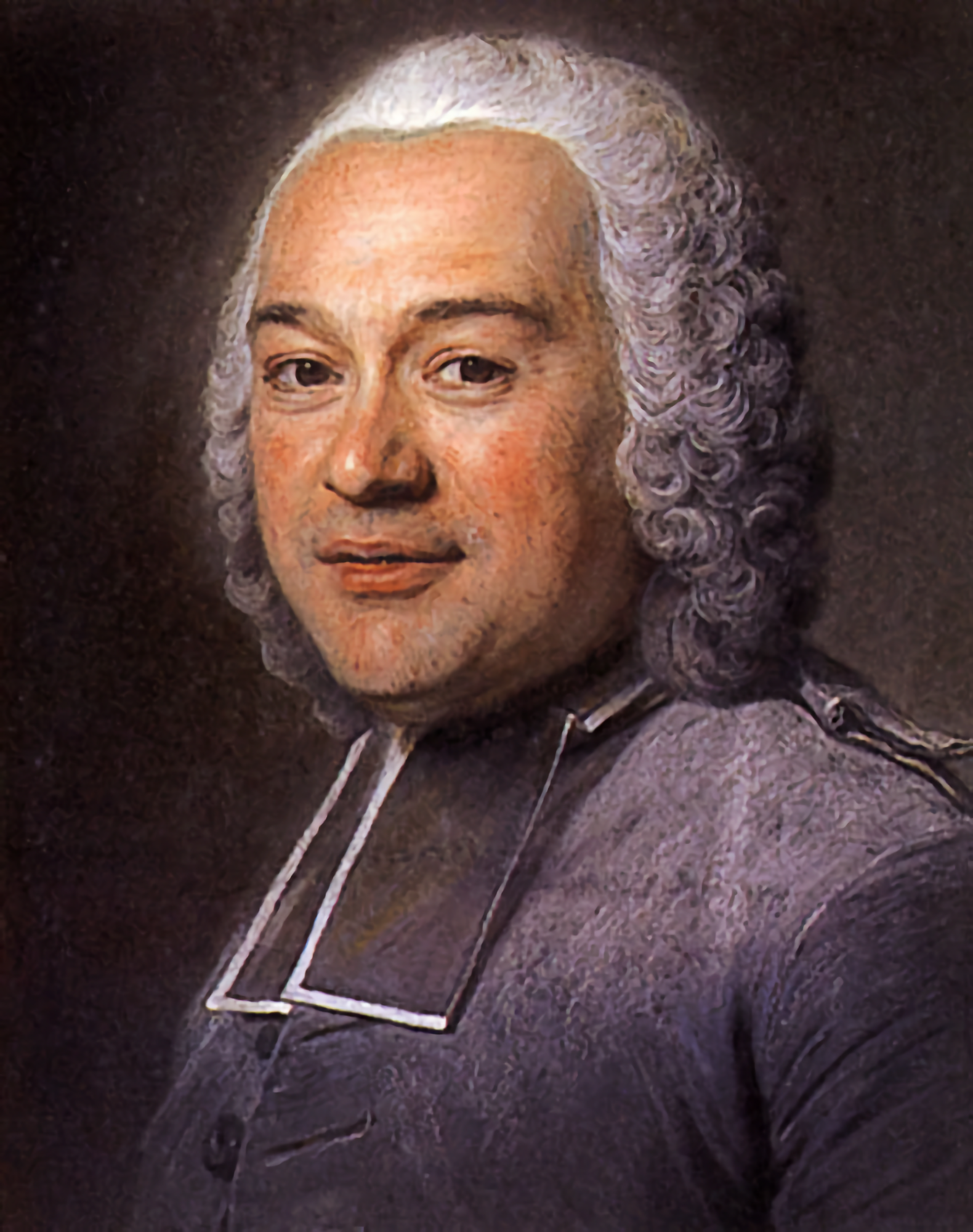
Jean-Bernard, abbé Le Blanc

Jean-Bernard, abbé Le Blanc (1707–1781, Paris) was a French art critic and one of the Parisian literati. Through his patron Mme de Pompadour, he was appointed historiographer of the Bâtiments du Roi, the defender of state expenditures and official French policy in the arts, and was also an advocate before the Parlement of Paris.

Le Blanc was born in Dijon. His minor orders were strictly pro forma, and he made his reputation with the Lettres d'un François (1745), a collection of letters detailing his perspectives on English society, of which he also made an English translation. Le Blanc had been invited to England by a nobleman in 1737 and remained for a year and a half, passing easily at every level of society, and expressing his observations in ninety-two letters that concerned the English almost entirely, and concentrated on social observation, with a minority of letters on politics and literature. The letters were based on the notebooks he carried with him everywhere, which were filled with his jottings on the spot. The results were widely read and approved as the judicious appraisal of particular and characteristic English types, viewed dispassionately.

Le Blanc was an early champion of Chardin, and his two letters on the Paris Salons, of 1747 and 1753 are a guide to enlightened contemporary taste and the defense of the Académie royale de peinture et de sculpture, whose members had the exclusive right to exhibit at the Paris Salon.

He was selected by Mme de Pompadour to accompany her brother Abel-François Poisson, future marquis de Marigny, on an educational trip to Italy in 1749–51, to prepare him for his post as director of the Bâtiments du Roi.

Le Blanc translated David Hume's Political Discourses (1752), and was entrusted, on leaving England, with a copy of Hume's History intended for Voltaire.

Le Blanc's portrait, by Maurice Quentin de La Tour, is at Saint-Quentin.

== Selected publications ==
- Élégies de Mr. L*. B*., avec un Discours sur ce genre de poésie et quelques autres pièces du mesme auteur..., Chaubert, ed., (Paris 1731).
- Lettres d'un François, J. Neaulme, ed, (The Hague 1745). 3 vols. Republished at least twice, as Lettres de M. l'abbé Le Blanc, 1751 and 1758, and translated by Le Blanc himself as Letters on the English and French nations, including a letter from Voltaire, dated 12 January 1746, (London: J. Brindley, 1747).
- Lettre sur l'exposition des ouvrages de peinture, sculpture &c, de l'Année 1747, Et en géneral, sur l'utilité de ces sortes d'expositions (Paris 1747) a response to the previous year's criticism of the Paris Salon by M. La Font de Saint-Yenne.
- Observations sur les Ouvrages de l'Académie de peinture et de sculpture (1753)
- Translated David Hume, Discours politiques de M. Hume (Amsterdam 1754).
- Translated John Tell Truth as Le Patriote anglois, ou Réflexions sur les hostilités que la France reproche à l'Angleterre et sur la réponse de nos ministres au dernier Mémoire de S. M. T. C., (Geneva 1756).
- Dialogues sur les mœurs des Anglois, et sur les voyages considérés comme faisant partie de l'éducation de la jeunesse, Barthelemi Hochereau le jeune, éditeur, 9Paris: Hochereau) 1765. Le Blanc's English translation was published in London.
- Aben Saïd, empereur des Mogols, tragédie en cinq actes et en vers..., (Paris: Prault) 1776.

All the available letters, preceded by a full-length introductory study, are in Hélène Monod-Cassidy, Un Voyageur-philosophe au XVIIIème siècle: l'abbé Jean-Bernard Le Blanc (Harvard Studies in Comparative Literature 17) 1941.
