= Jean Joly (sculptor) =

French sculptor

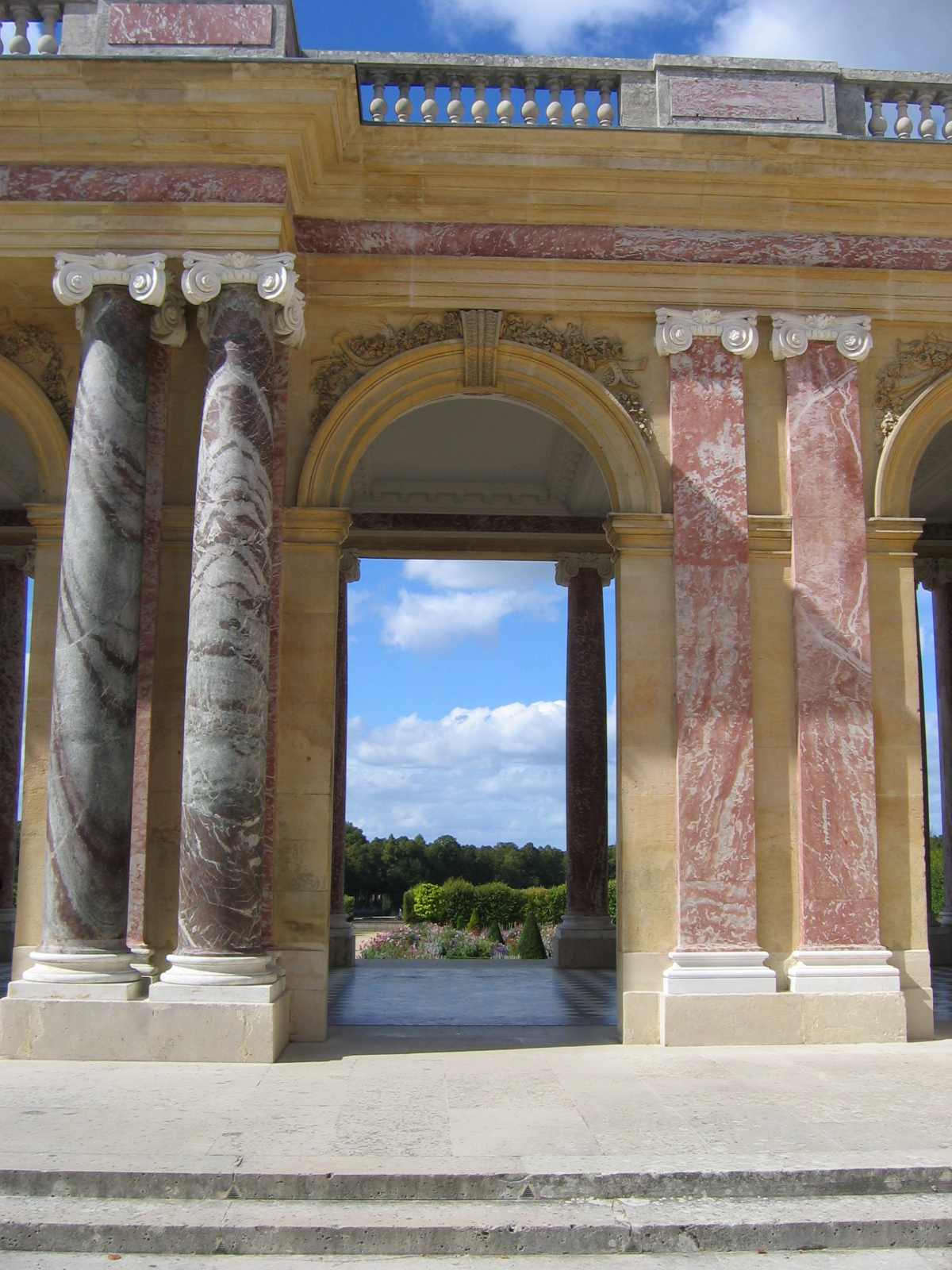
arches and capitals for Grand Trianon by Jean Joly, Palace of Versailles

Jean Joly (16 April 1650 – 1740) was a French sculptor.

Joly was a student of François Girardon. He attended the Académie royale de peinture et de sculpture where he won the Prix de Rome for the sculpture Fratricide de Cain in 1680. He stayed in Rome at the Villa Medici between 1680 and 1686. He collaborated with Nicolas Coustou and Antoine Coysevox. Joly made arches and capitals for Grand Trianon vases with flowers and various stone and metal for gardens at the Palace of Versailles.
