= Nicodemo Ferrucci =

Italian painter (1574–1650)

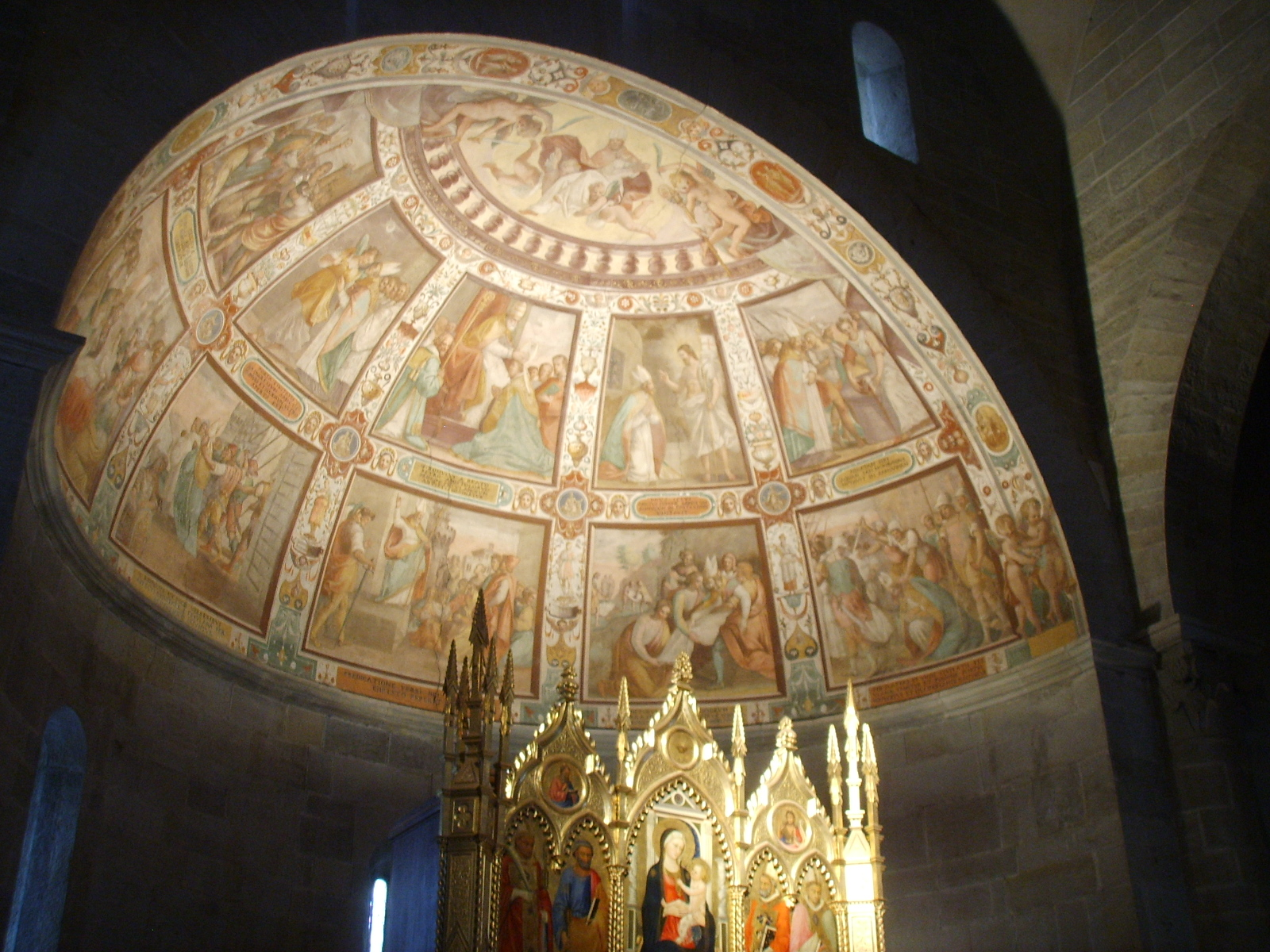
Nicodemo Ferrucci, Stories of St. Romulus, dome of Fiesole Cathedral, Fiesole, Italy

Nicodemo Ferrucci (1574–1650) was an Italian painter of the Baroque period, active mainly in Rome. He was born in Fiesole. He was the pupil of the painter Domenico Passignano and assisted him with frescoes in Rome. Ferrucci was also a prolific painter of portraits, including contemporary artists from Tuscany.
