= Domenico Maria Bonavera =

Italian painter

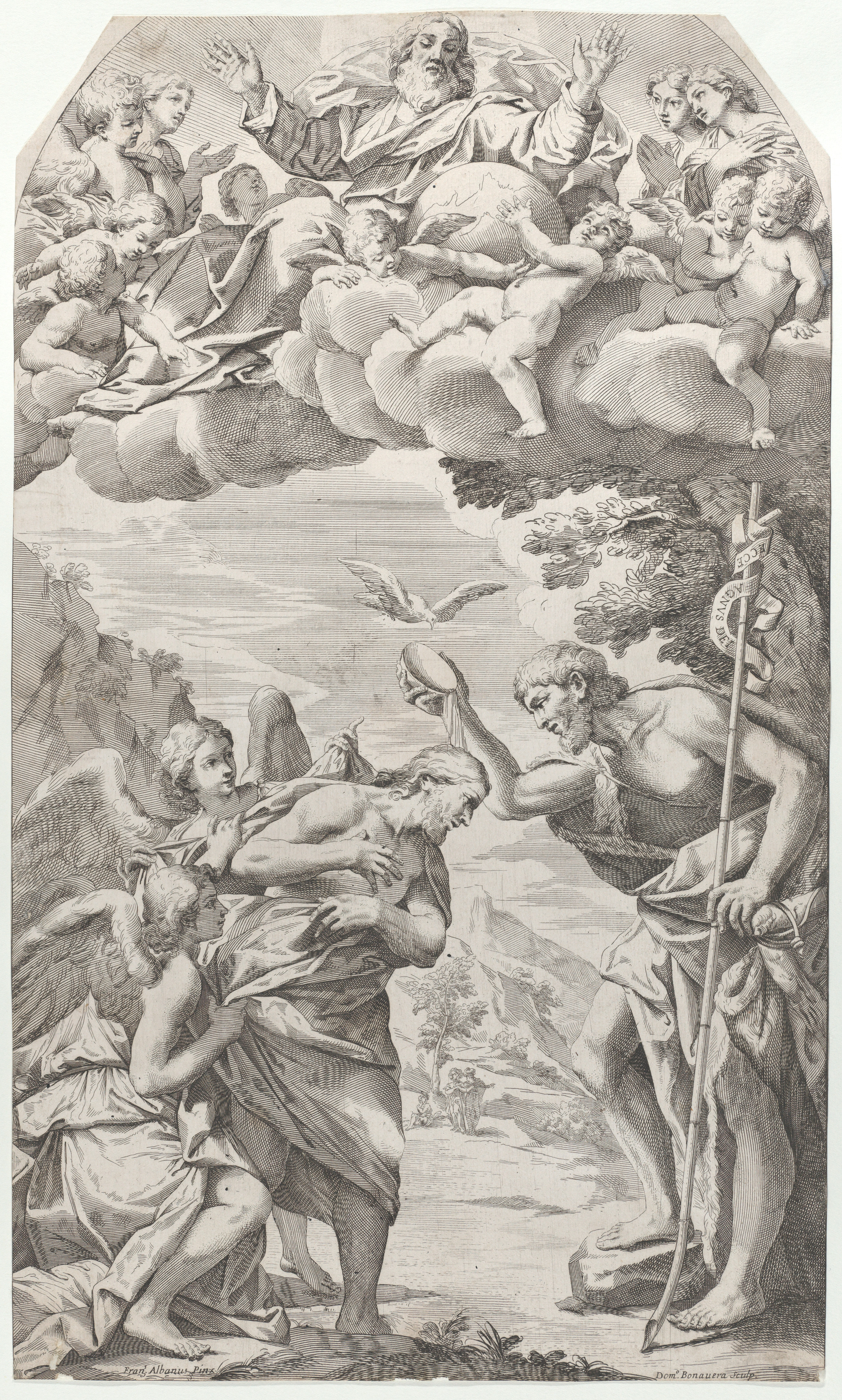
The Baptism of Christ

Domenico Maria Bonavera (born c.1650; date of death unknown) was an Italian engraver. He was born in Bologna. He trained in engraving with his uncle Domenico Maria Canuti. His plates are chiefly etched and finished with the dry point. He engraved eighteen plates from the designs of Titian, for a textbook of anatomy. He completed prints depicting: The Baptism of Christ after Albani; St. Anne teaching the Virgin Mary to read, St. Theresa with the Infant Jesus, and a Martyrdom of St. Christiana after Canuti; a St. John preaching after Ludovico Carracci; Lot and his Daughters after Annibale Carracci; The Assumption fresco at the Cupola of the Duomo of Parma (1697); after Correggio
