= Mei Qing =

Chinese landscape painter, calligrapher and poet

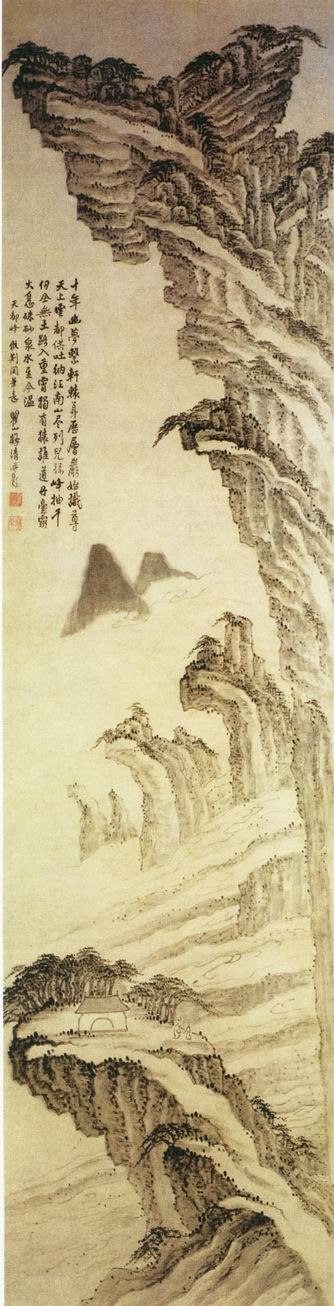
Tiandu Peak of Mount Huangshan. Ink on paper. Palace Museum, Beijing.

Mei Qing (Chinese: 梅清; pinyin: Méi Qīng; Wade–Giles: Mei Ch'ing; ca. 1623–1697) was a Chinese landscape painter, calligrapher and poet active during the Qing Dynasty.

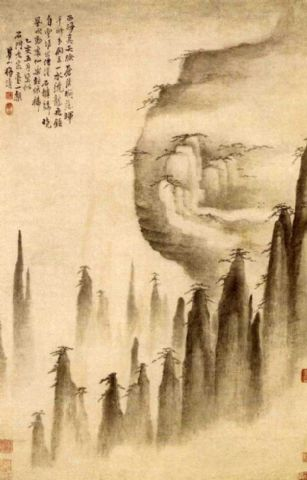
Two Immortals on Huangshan

Mei was born in Xuancheng, Anhui Province. His style name was 'Yuangong' (渊公 or 远公) and his pseudonyms were 'Mount Qu' (Qushan 瞿山), 'Winter Hut' (Xue Lu 雪庐), and 'Lao Qu Fan Fu' (老瞿凡父). Mei was taught by Wang Meng. He was a friend Shitao, influencing some of Shitao's earlier works. His landscape paintings were based on his many travels to the Yellow Mountain.

His works on poetry include: Tian Yan Garret Collection (天延阁集) and Mei Shi Anthology (梅氏诗略).
