= Maurizio Baldassari =

Italian menswear brand

Maurizio Baldassari is a high-end, Italian menswear brand based in the Brera district of Milan. The brand was founded by Maurizio Baldassari in 1982. He began his career much earlier at the renowned La Rinascente in 1957. The company is family owned and operated, involving his sons, Renato and Roberto Baldassari.

The brand is sold at Bergdorf Goodman, Bloomingdales, Harry Rosen, Holt Renfrew, Mitchells Stores, and Boyds.

== See also ==
- Eleventy
- Brunello Cucinelli
- Loro Piana
- Made in Italy
- Quiet luxury
