= Huang Ding =

Chinese landscape painter and poet

- Traditional Chinese: 黃鼎
- Simplified Chinese: 黄鼎
Transcriptions
Standard Mandarin
- Hanyu Pinyin: Huáng Dĭng
- Wade–Giles: Huang2 Ting3

Huang Ding (Chinese: 黃鼎, Wade–Giles: Huang Ting; c. 1650 – 1730) was a Chinese landscape painter and poet active during the Qing dynasty (1644–1912).

Huang was born in Changshu in the Jiangsu province. His style names was 'Zhungu' and his sobriquets were 'Kuangting, Xianpu, and Du Wangke'. Huang's landscapes were painted in the style of Wang Yuanqi, showing great strength through its imagery. He traveled extensively, and the varied destinations appear in many of his paintings.
