= Lodewijk de Deyster =

Flemish draftsman, etcher, engraver, musical instrument maker and instrument maker

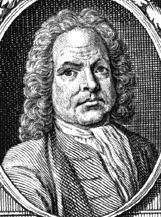
- Born: 1656; Bruges, Flanders
- Died: 18 December 1711 (aged 54–55)
- Known for: Baroque painting, musical instruments
- Style: Flemish Baroque

Lodewijk de Deyster (c. 1656 – 18 December 1711) was a Flemish draftsman, etcher, engraver, musical instrument maker and instrument maker. He painted biblical subjects and portraits. His Baroque paintings show a clear influence of Italian masters such as Giordano, Maratta, Barocci and Flemish painters like Peter Paul Rubens, Anthony van Dyck and Jan Boeckhorst. He was also a dealer in fabrics.

== Life ==
De Deyster was born around 1656 in Bruges as the son of Lodewijk and Cornelia van Heyschoten. He was a pupil of Jan Maes, a respected local artist. From 1682 to 1688, he lived and worked in Italy mostly in the company of his travel companion Antoon or Anthonie van den Eeckhoute. They spent time in Venice and Rome. In 1688 the pair returned to Bruges.

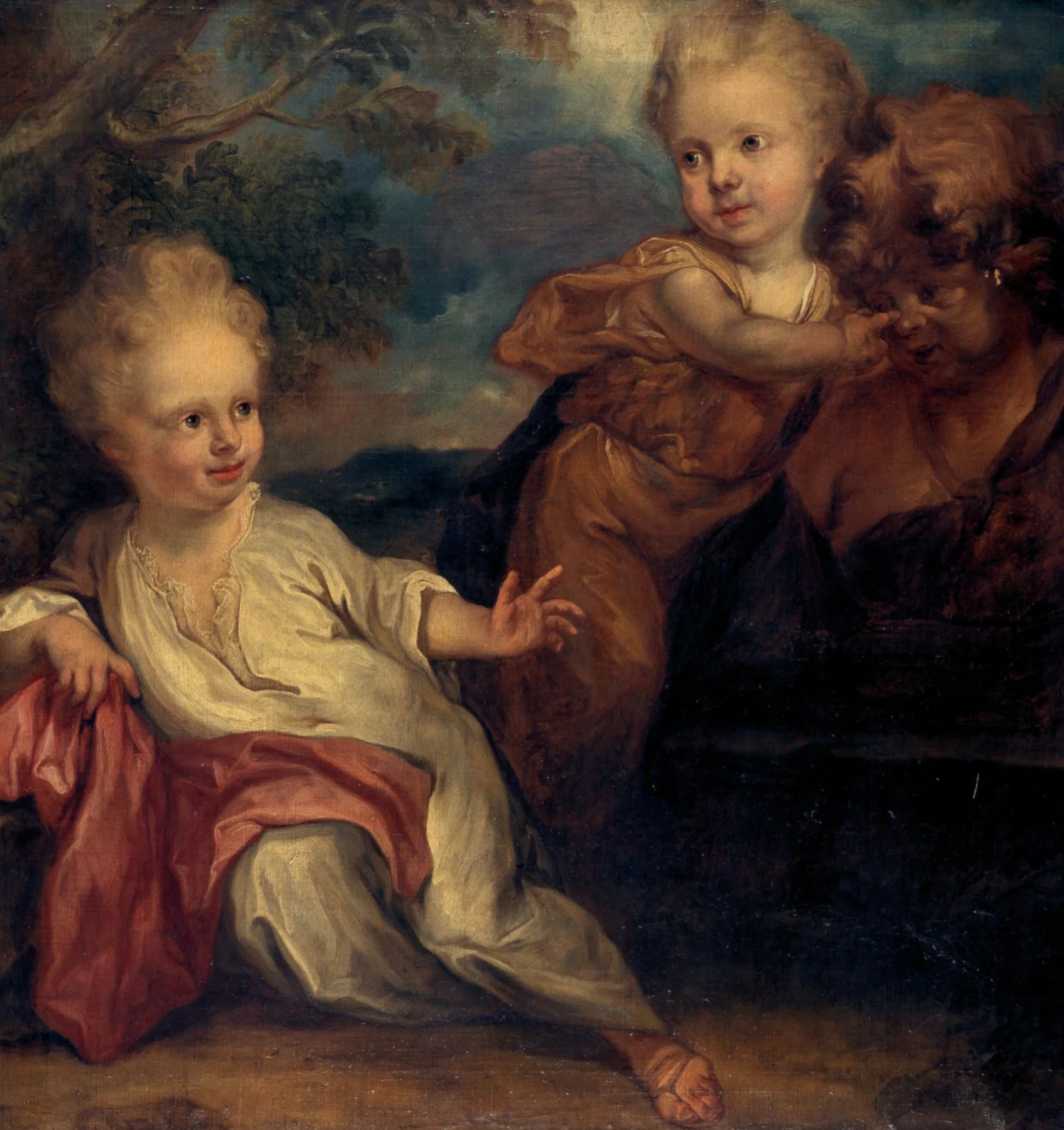
Allegory of Sculpture

He became a free-master in the local Guild of Saint Luke on 4 March 1688. He married on 29 August 1690 in the Church of Our Lady, Bruges, with Dorothea van den Eeckhoute, sister of his friend and travel-companion Antoon. The couple had four children: Maria-Magdalena (bapt. 28 March 1689), Anna Louisa (bapt. 29 August 1690), Lodewijk Antoon and Joost Eloi (both baptized on 1 December 1691; the boys died shortly afterwards on 7 and 10 December respectively). Anna Louisa also became a painter and musical instrument maker.

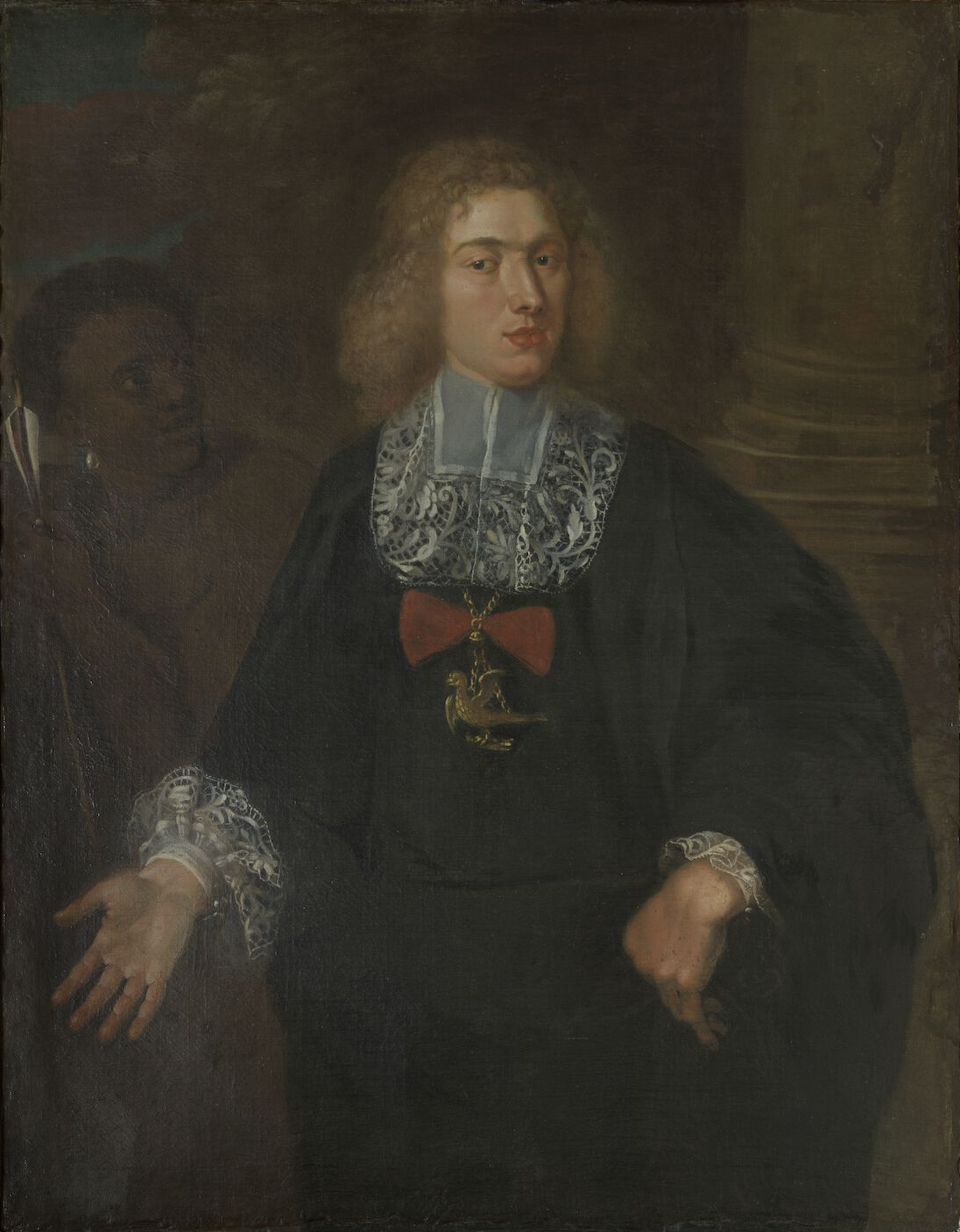
Portrait of Gaspar de Vos, head of the St. Sebastian Guild of Guild of Bruges in 1673

De Deyster was also a harpsichord, violin and organ builder. In 1707, he was commissioned to complete the Jacob van Eynde organ in St. Anne's Church in Bruges. He also built the organs for the church of the Holy Cross and for the Bogarden Chapel. According to contemporary reports, his passion for making musical instruments instead of painting reduced him to poverty and when he returned to his native Bruges.

He died in Bruges where he was buried on 20 December 1711 in the cemetery of the St. Salvator's Cathedral.

== Work ==
Moses defends the daughters of Jethro. Musea Brugge - Groeningemuseum. c. circa 1680-circa 1690

He painted mainly biblical subjects, in addition to some portraits and allegorical scenes. He painted many pictures for the churches of his native city. From his stay in Italy, he had brought with him a flamboyant Roman Baroque style. His treatment of light and shade in his paintings resembles that of Rembrandt. He drowns his figures in artificial chiaroscuro. His style is further characterized by the dramatization of the characters and the soft form of the figures because of his use of sfumato.

There are three large paintings representing three scenes from the Passion and one of Elijah under the juniper tree by him in the St. Salvator's Cathedral in Bruges. In the St. James's Church in Bruges, there are three paintings by de Deyster representing the Crucifixion, the Resurrection, and the Death of the Virgin. In the Church of St Anne, also in Bruges, there is a Martydom of St Sebastian.

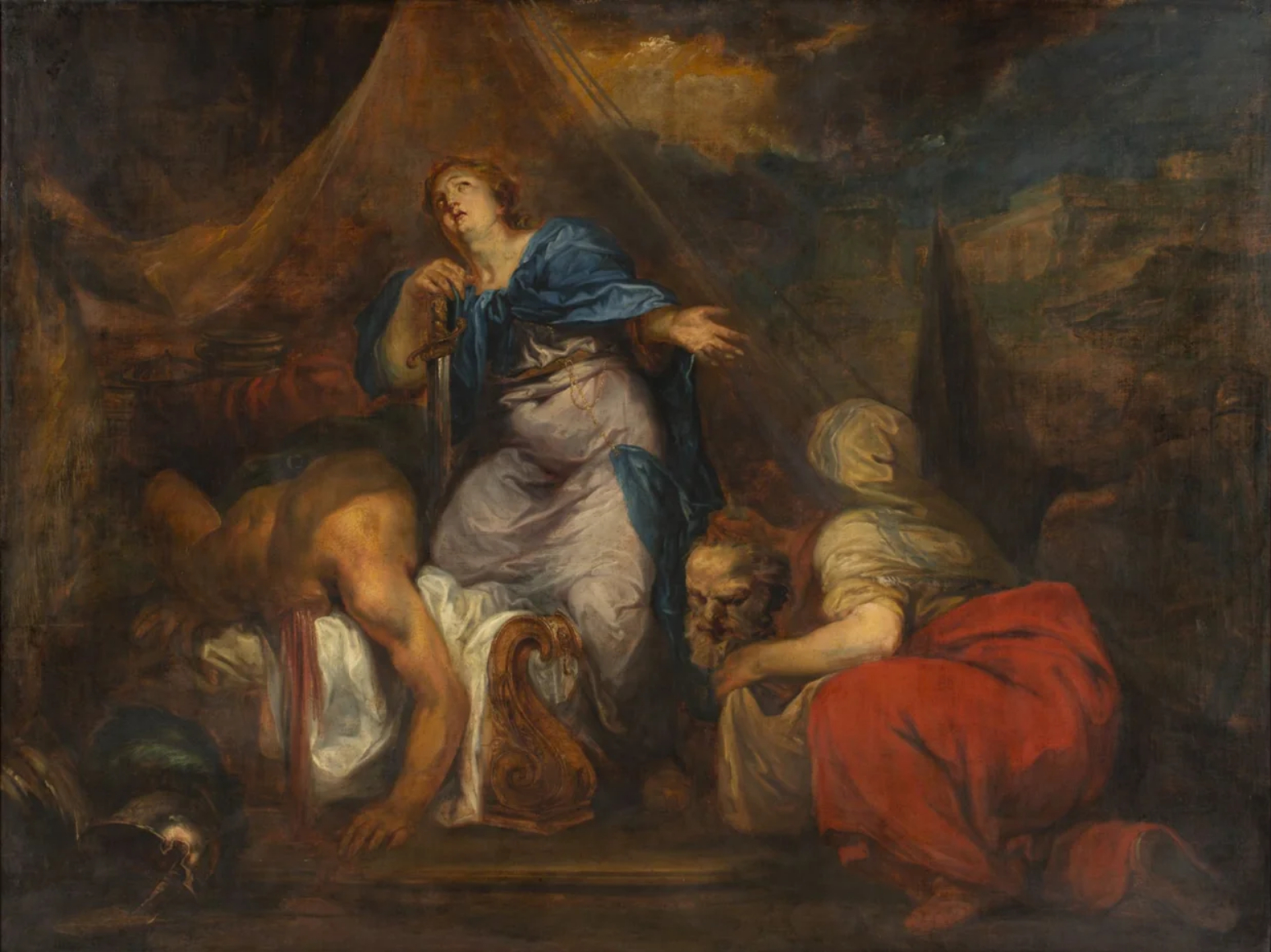
The Death of Holofernes.

He created 16 etchings with old testament themes. He also produced one known mezzotint. His prints share with his paintings high drama and energy, with protagonists arranged in complex poses. Just as de Deyster applied his paint with freedom and spontaneity, so did he etch the plate.
