= Miguel Posadas =

Spanish painter

Miguel Posadas (1711–1753) was a Spanish painter. He was born in Aragon and became a Dominican friar living in Valencia, where he painted historical scenes.
