= A Gipsy Girl =

1794 painting by Thomas Lawrence

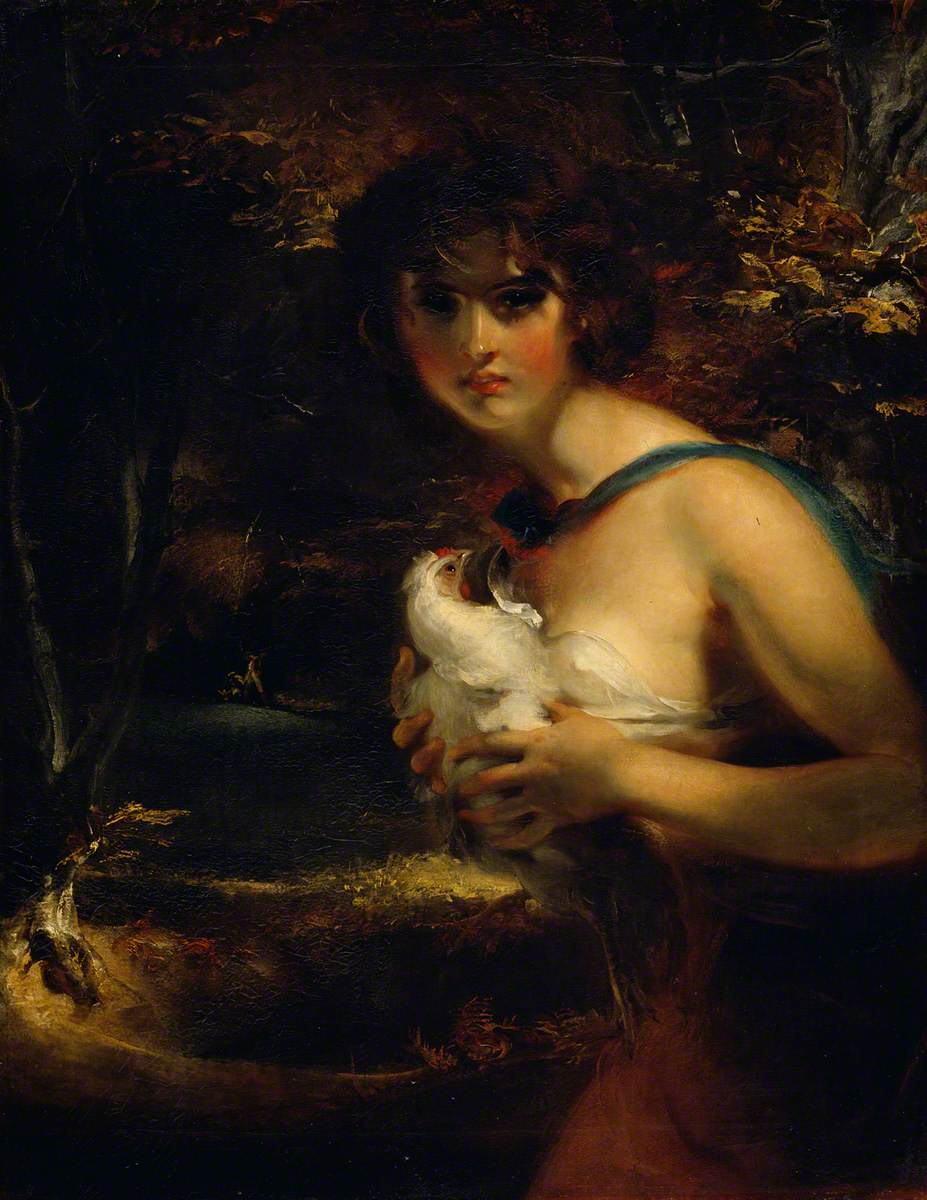
- Artist: Thomas Lawrence
- Year: 1794
- Type: Oil on canvas, fancy picture
- Dimensions: 91.5 cm × 71.1 cm (36.0 in × 28.0 in)
- Location: Royal Academy of Arts; London

A Gipsy Girl is a 1794 oil painting by the British artist Thomas Lawrence. It depicts a young woman, who resembles a poacher as much as a gipsy, with a chicken clutched to her chest. An angry farmer is seen in the background. The sitter is sometimes suggested to be Maria Siddons, the daughter of the celebrated actress of Sarah Siddons. Lawrence was involved romantically with both Maria and her elder sister Sally.

When Lawrence was elected full member of the Royal Academy of Arts a few months before his twenty-fifth birthday he was required to submit a diploma work. As portraitists were not permitted to submit their normal line, Lawrence instead produced this Fancy picture as his submission. It featured at a retrospective of Lawrence's work staged by the British Institution in 1833. It was also displayed at the Art Treasures Exhibition in Manchester in 1857.

== Bibliography ==
- Albinson, Cassandra, Funnell, Peter & Peltz, Lucy. Thomas Lawrence: Regency Power and Brilliance. Yale University Press, 2010.
- Coltman, Viccy. Henry Raeburn: Context, Reception and Reputation. Edinburgh University Press, 2019.
- Engel, Laura. Women, Performance and the Material of Memory: The Archival Tourist, 1780–1915. : Palgrave Macmillan, 2018.
- Pergam, Elizabeth A. The Manchester Art Treasures Exhibition of 1857. Routledge, 2017.
- Postle, Martin. Angels & Urchins: The Fancy Picture in 18th-century British Art. Djanogly Art Gallery, 1998.
- Wright, Amina. Thomas Lawrence: Coming of Age. Bloomsbury Publishing, 2020.
