= Abel Dimier =

French sculptor

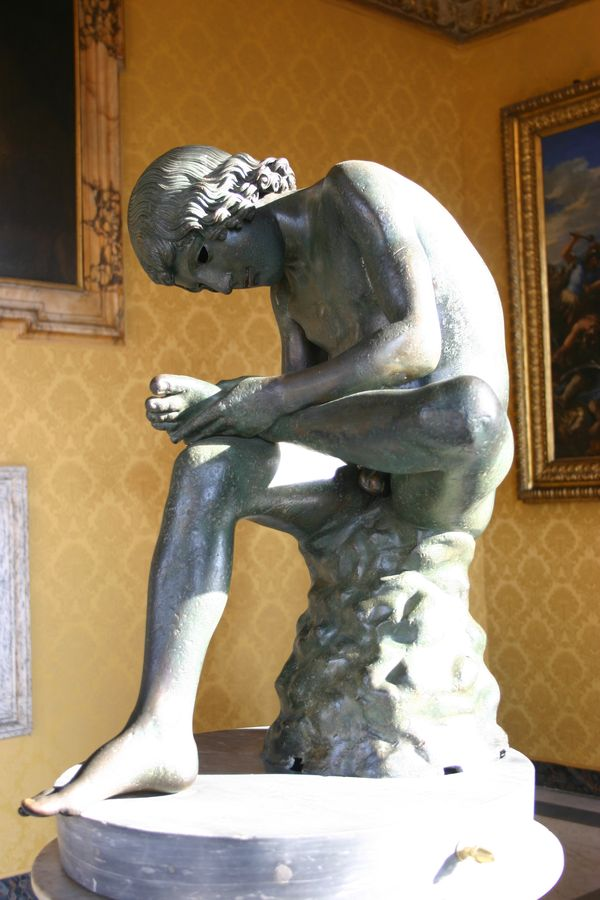
Le Tireur d'épines

Abel Dimier (14 September 1794 – 15 November 1864) was a French sculptor.

Dimier was born in Paris and was a pupil of Cartelli. He won the Prix de Rome in 1819 with a bas-relief in plaster named Enée blessé, gueri par Vénus, which can be seen at the École nationale supérieure des Beaux-Arts. From 1820 to 1824, he lived at the French Academy in Rome, alongside many sculptors, including Auguste Dumont, Francisque Joseph Duret, Georges Jacquot, Joseph Philippe Lemaire, Étienne-Jules Ramey, and Bernard Gabriel Seurre.

== Main works ==
- Enée blessé, gueri par Vénus, bas-relief, 1819, Paris, École nationale supérieure des Beaux-Arts
- Le Tireur d'épines, statue, marble, Lyon, musée des beaux-arts, 1829
