= Francisco de Artiga =

Spanish landscape and historical painter

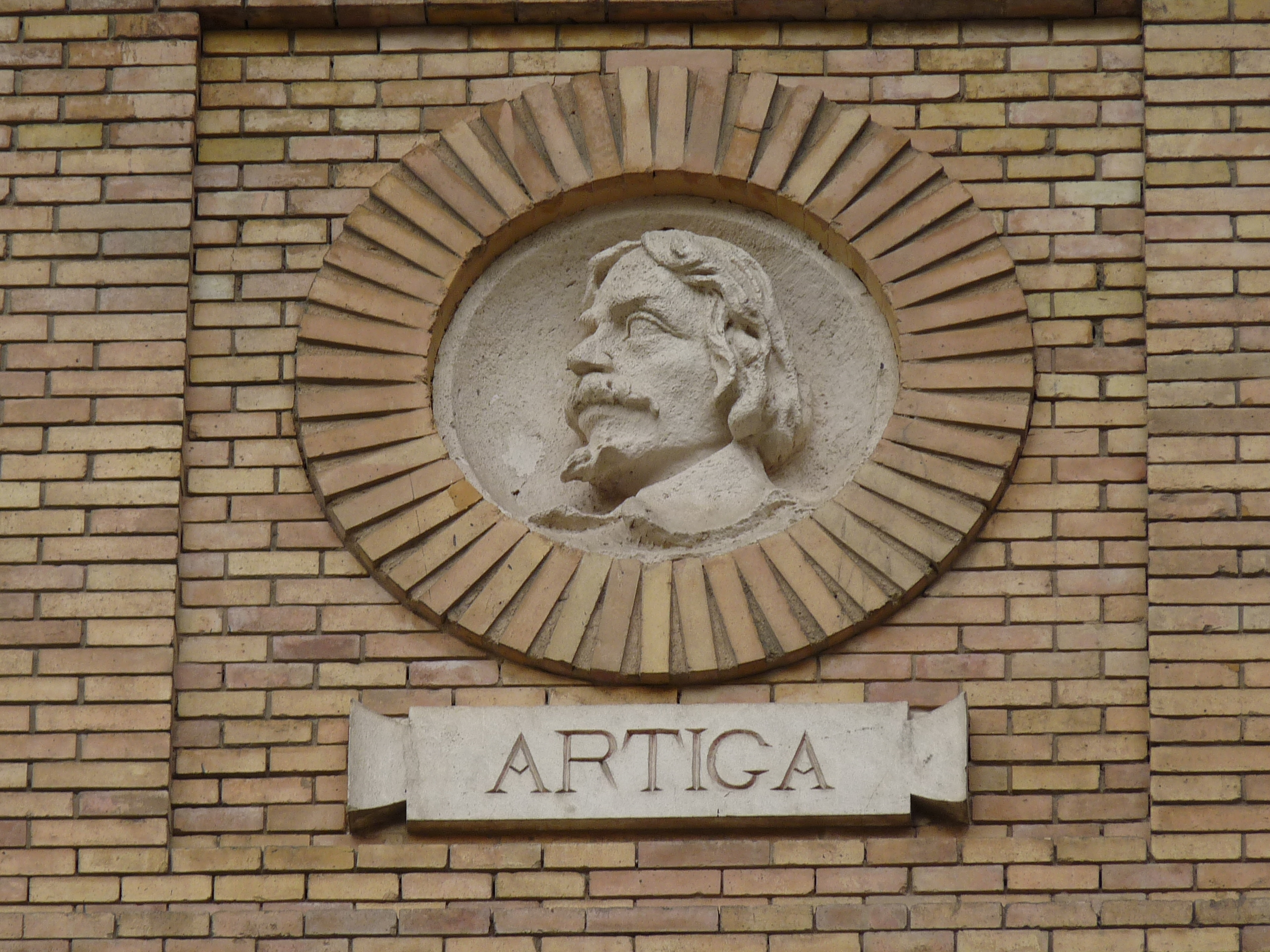
Artiga on the facade of the former Faculty of Medicine in Zaragoza.

Francisco de Artiga was a Spanish landscape and historical painter born at Huesca about 1650. He painted several 'Sibyls,' 'Conceptions,' and perspective views. He was also an engraver, an architect, a mathematician, and an author. He died in 1711 at Huesca.
