= Giovanni Francesco Venturini =

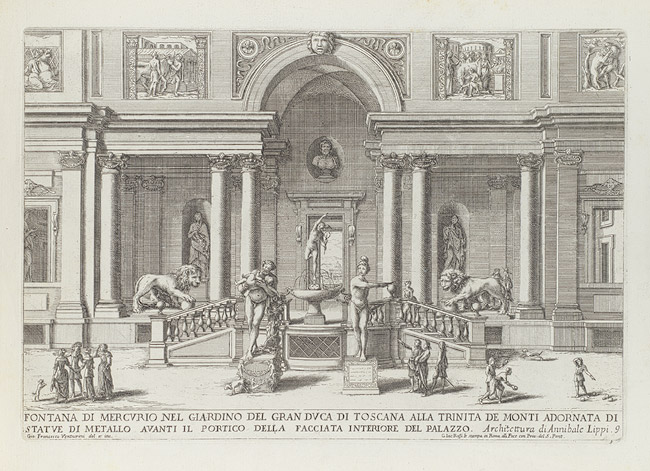
Villa Medici with the Medici lions; etching by Venturini 1691.

Giovanni Francesco Venturini (1650–1710) was an Italian printmaker of the Baroque period.

He was born in Rome. From the style of his engraving, it is probable that he was a pupil of Giovanni Battista Galestruzzi. He etched several plates from the works of Italian masters, among them the following :

- A set of Plates; after Polidoro da Caravaggio.
- Diana and her Nymphs; after Domenichino.
- The Pulpit of S. Peter's; after Bernini.
- A partial bird's-eye View of Rome.
