= Jacopo Marieschi =

Italian painter

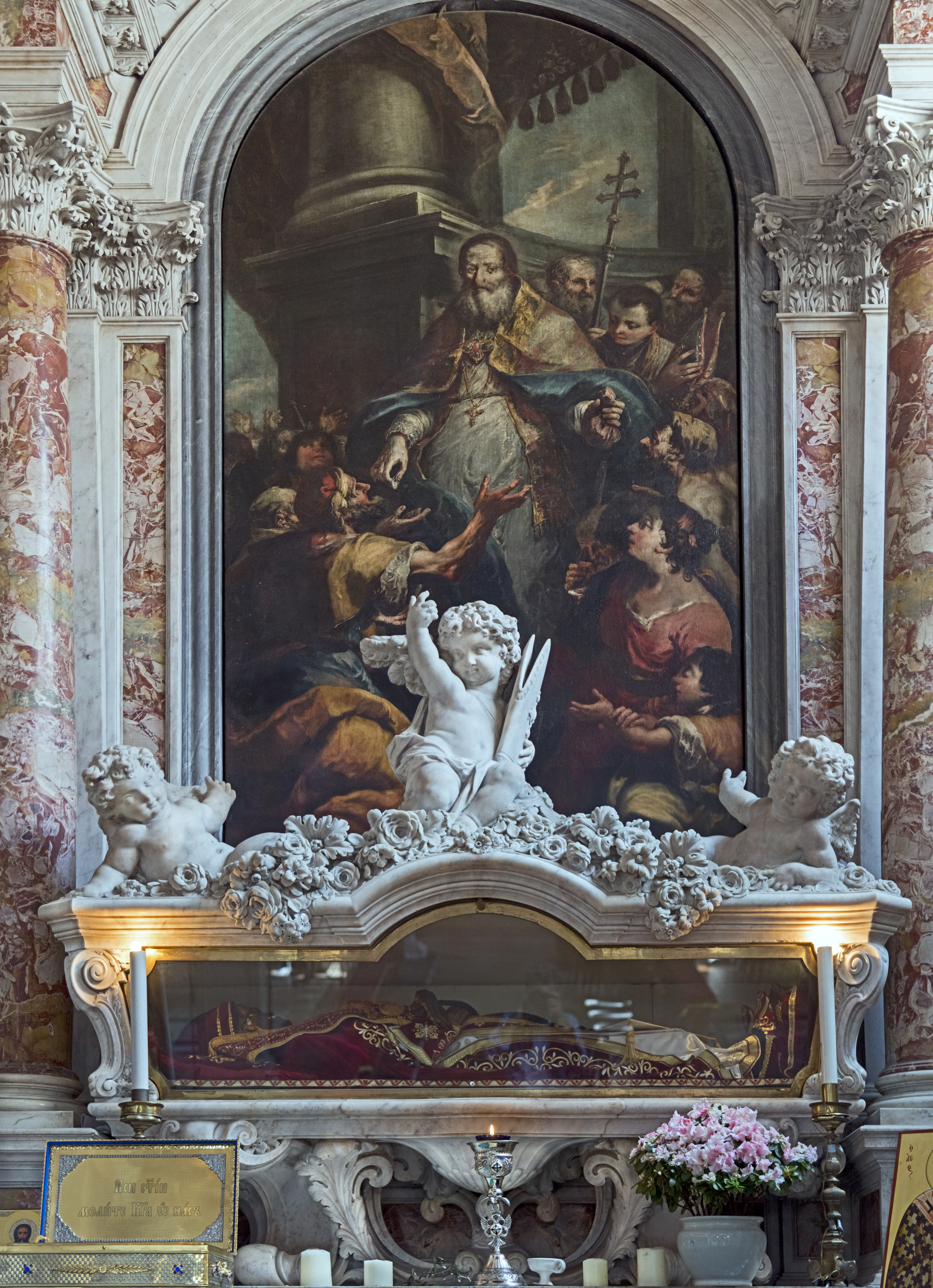
Altarpiece of St John the Almoner, San Giovanni in Bragora, Venice 1743

Jacopo Marieschi (1711–1794) was a Venetian history painter. Formerly he was confused with the prominent vedute painter, Michele Marieschi, his close contemporary.

He was also called Giacomo Marieschi. He painted allegorical figures of Faith, Hope, and Charity at San Francesco della Vigna.
