= Alessandro Mari =

Italian painter (1650–1707)

Alessandro Mari (1650–1707) was an Italian painter of the Baroque period.

While born in Turin, Mari soon left to train under Domenico Piola, next under Pietro Liberi, and again under Lorenzo Pasinelli; always uniting the practice of painting with the cultivation of poetry. He ultimately became a celebrated copyist, and a successful designer of capricci and symbolical representations, by which he established a reputation in Milan, and afterwards in Spain. He died in Madrid.
