= Christian Ulrik Foltmar =

Danish wallpaper weaver, painter, and organist

Christian Ulrik Foltmar (c. 1716 – 11 August 1794) was a Danish wallpaper weaver, painter of miniatures and organist.

Foltmar was the son of the musician Johan Voltmar, and he was a brother to the composers Herman Friedrich Voltmar, Johan Foltmar, and to the painter Christoffer Foltmar. When he had his daughter baptized on 22 March 1769 he was in the parish register addressed as organist, however he primarily worked as a miniature painter. After his brother Christoffer's death, he took over as royal painter to the court painting portrait miniatures. There is also a self-portrait of him and his wife. He is buried at St. Peter's church cemetery.
