= Fancy picture =

Genre of 18th-century paintings

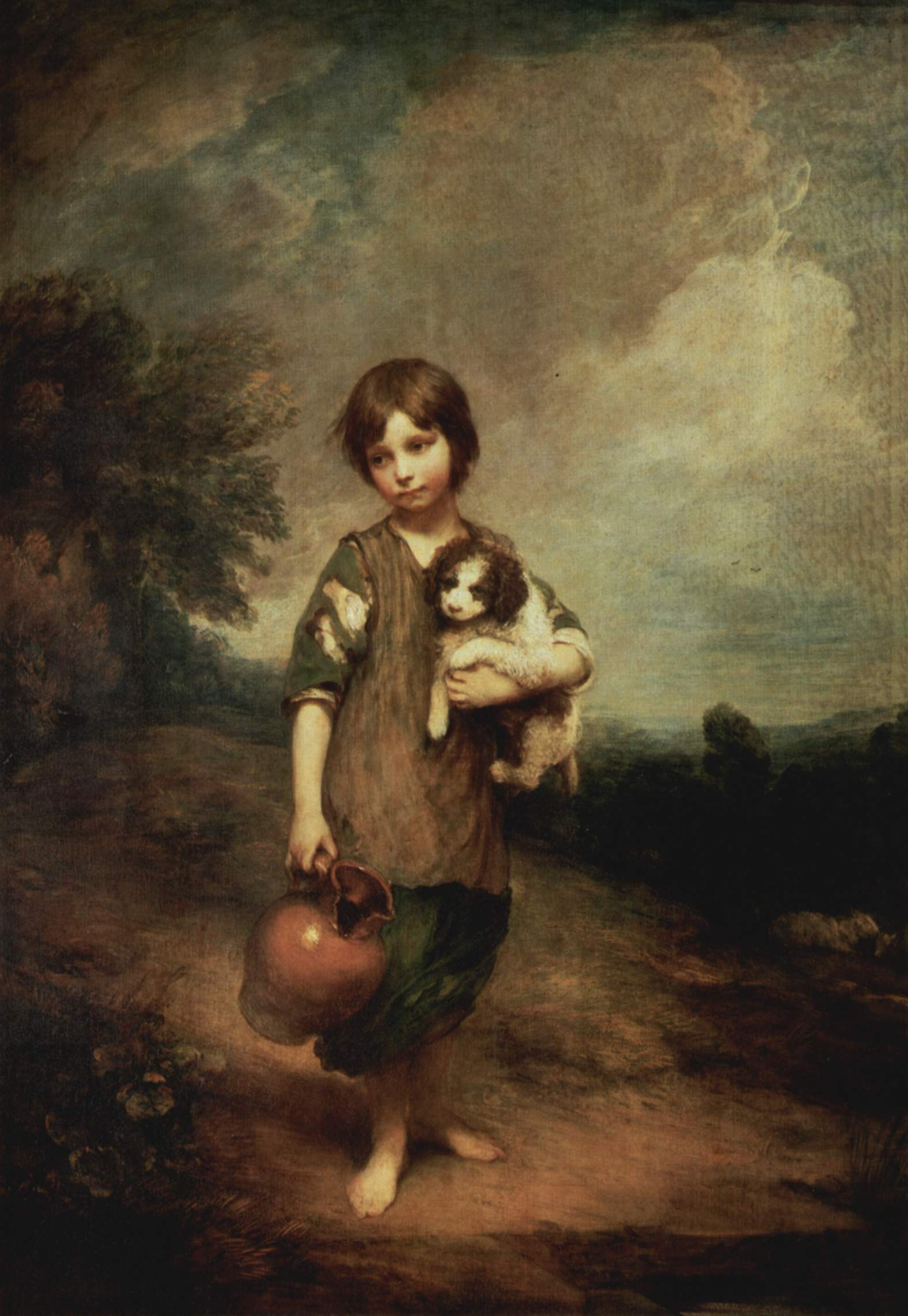
Cottage Girl with Dog and Pitcher (1785), one of Thomas Gainsborough's late fancy pictures

Fancy pictures are a sub-genre of genre paintings in 18th-century English art, featuring scenes of everyday life but with an imaginative or storytelling element, usually sentimental. The usage of the term varied, and there was often an overlap with the conversation piece, a type of group portrait showing the subjects engaged in some activity.

Most fancy pictures depict children or young women, life-size or somewhat smaller, but some are landscapes with figures. The people depicted are more "democratic" than the upper-class subjects of portraits, and are characteristically portrayed with what has been termed "a sort of contrived innocence", sometimes eroticised.

The term derives from fancies, which the art critic and historian George Vertue used in 1737 to describe paintings by Philip Mercier such as Venetian Girl at a Window or the series The Five Senses, which incorporate a storyline or invented or imagined elements. Joshua Reynolds coined the extended term 'fancy pictures' in 1788 for the works painted by Thomas Gainsborough in his final decade, particularly those depicting beggar and peasant children. Following his death, Gainsborough was initially best known for these pictures. Reynolds' own fancy pictures, while using street children as models, have allegorical and classical titles such as Hope Nursing Love and Venus Chiding Cupid. The sub-genre owes inspiration to Rembrandt and Murillo and was influenced by 18th-century French works, particularly by Chardin, Greuze, as Mercier had been influenced by European artists including Watteau, but it is not a distinct sub-genre in French painting.

Eighteenth-century fancy pictures were an antecedent of Victorian sentimentalism; J. E. Millais' paintings of children, such as his My First Sermon and My Second Sermon, modelled by his young daughter, were called fancy pictures.
