= Valerio Baldassari =

Italian painter

Valerio Baldassari (c.1650 – after 1695), also known as Baldissari, was an Italian painter of the Baroque period. He was born in Pescia, and trained with Pietro Dandini. He is said to have "worked with such speedy flair ... that his works look rather like preliminary drafts than finished paintings" (lavorava ogni cosa con quella tale sprezzatura... di modo che le sue opere sembrano piuttosto abozzi che pitture terminate).
