= Johan Foltmar =

Danish composer

Johan Foltmar (1714 – 26 April 1794) was a Danish composer.

== See also ==
- List of Danish composers
