= 1856 in art =

Events from the year 1856 in art.

== Events ==
- March 19 – A settlement is approved in the Court of Chancery establishing the Turner Bequest to the nation
- May 1 – Charles Lutwidge Dodgson ('Lewis Carroll') takes up photography as a hobby
- May 5 – The Royal Academy Exhibition of 1856 opens at the National Gallery in London
- July – Pauline, Lady Trevelyan, paints an image of the local wild poppies on a pilaster at her home of Wallington Hall, Northumberland (England), her most noted contribution to the Pre-Raphaelite masterpiece that is the central hall here
- August 25 – Dante Gabriel Rossetti first encounters Fanny Cornforth (Sarah Cox) in a London pleasure garden; the following day he sketches her head in his studio for the figure of a prostitute in his unfinished painting Found
- December 2 – The National Portrait Gallery, London, is established
- December 8 – Édouard Manet opens his own studio
- Owen Jones publishes The Grammar of Ornament, illustrated in chromolithography

== Awards ==
- Austrian Imperial Prize for Sculpture – Joseph Boehm

== Works ==
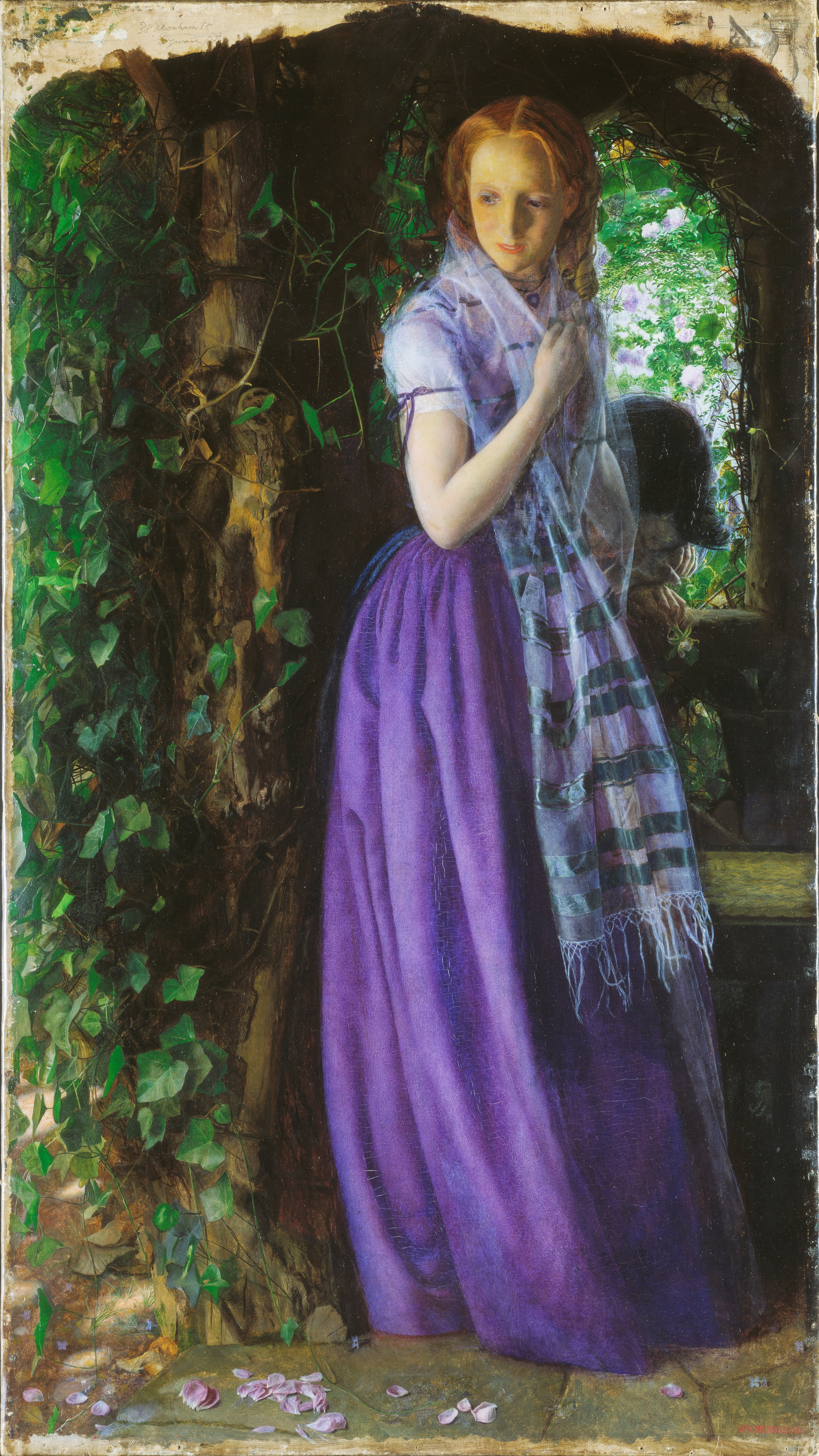
Arthur Hughes – April Love

- Ivan Aivazovsky – A Strong Wind
- William-Adolphe Bouguereau – La Danse (approximate date)
- Ford Madox Brown – Take your Son, Sir! (unfinished)
- Philip Hermogenes Calderon – Broken Vows
- Théodore Chassériau
  - Moorish Woman Leaving the Bath
  - Susanna and the Elders
- Samuel Colman – Meadows and Wildflowers at Conway
- Édouard Dubufe – The Congress of Paris
- John Faed – Portrait of George Washington Taking the Salute at Trenton
- William Powell Frith
  - Kate Nickleby at Madame Mantalini's
  - Many Happy Returns of the Day
- Hiroshige – One Hundred Famous Views of Edo (ukiyo-e woodblock print series begins publication)
- Arthur Hughes – April Love
- William Holman Hunt – The Scapegoat (large version)
- Jean Auguste Dominique Ingres
  - Madame Moitessier
  - La Source
- Jozef Israëls – Passing Mother's Grave (Langs Moeders Graf)
- Sir Edwin Landseer – Saved
- Baron Carlo Marochetti – Richard Coeur de Lion (statue)
- John Everett Millais
  - Autumn Leaves
  - The Blind Girl
  - Peace Concluded
- Jean-François Millet – Shepherdess Seated on a Rock
- Henry Nelson O'Neil – The Pre-Raphaelite
- Adeline Harris Sears – Quilt, Tumbling Blocks with Signatures pattern (quilt begun)
- Horace Vernet – Zouaves at the Malakoff
- Eugene von Guerard – View of Geelong
- Henry Wallis – The Death of Chatterton
- Edward Matthew Ward
  - Byron's Early Love
  - The Last Parting of Marie Antoinette and Her Son

== Births ==
- January 7 – Charles Harold Davis, American landscape painter (died 1933)
- January 8 – Elizabeth Taylor, American painter (died 1932)
- January 12 – John Singer Sargent, Florentine-born American portrait painter (died 1925)
- February 29 – John Ward Dunsmore, American painter (died 1945)
- March 8 – Colin Campbell Cooper, American impressionist painter (died 1937)
- March 9 – Tom Roberts, Australian painter (died 1931)
- March 11 – Georges Petit, French art dealer (died 1920)
- May 20 – Henri-Edmond Cross, French neo-impressionist painter (died 1910)
- October 9 – F. W. Pomeroy, English sculptor (died 1924)
- October 28
  - Carolina Benedicks-Bruce, Swedish sculptor (died 1935)
  - Anna Elizabeth Klumpke, American portrait and genre painter (died 1942)
- November 6 – Jefferson David Chalfant, American trompe-l'œil painter (died 1931)
- November 11 – Alfred Drury, English sculptor (died 1944)
- November 18 – Joakim Skovgaard, Danish painter (died 1933)
- November 21 – Eveleen Tennant, English portrait photographer (died 1937)
- Undated – Harry Fidler, English equine painter (died 1935)

== Deaths ==
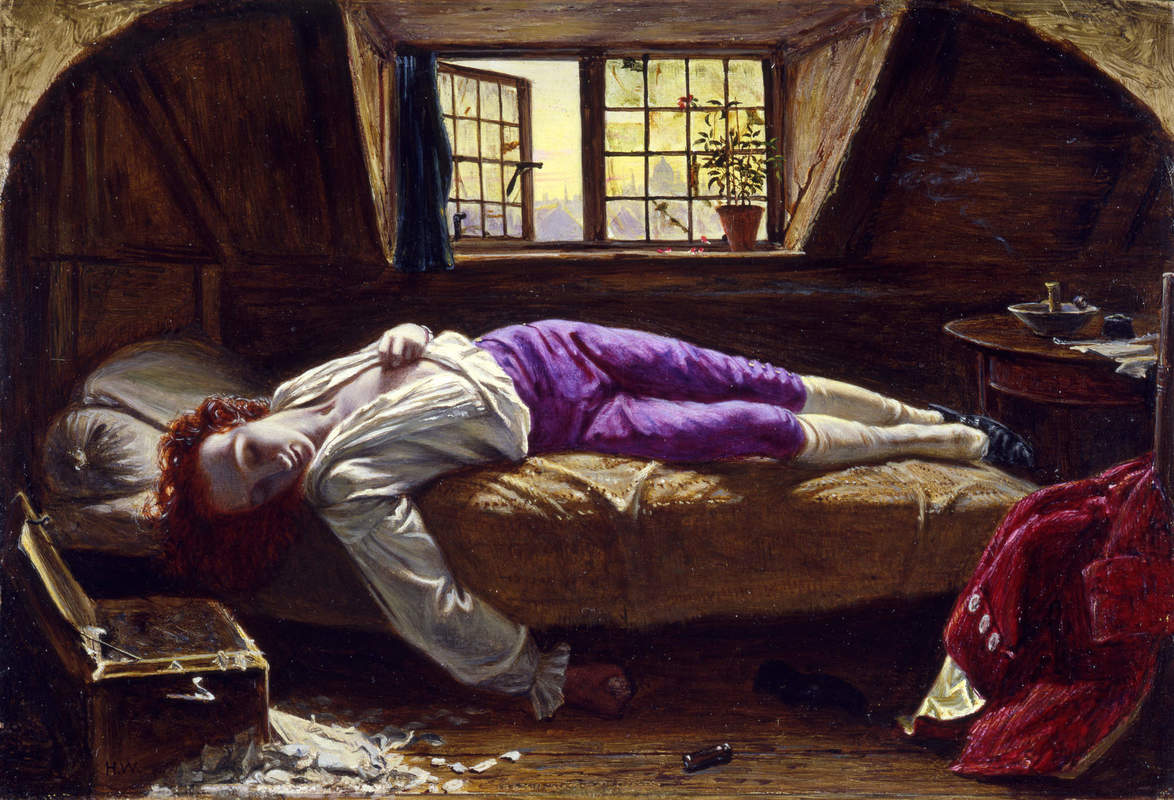
Henry Wallis – The Death of Chatterton

- January 4 – David d'Angers (Pierre-Jean David), French sculptor and engraver (born 1788)
- April 5 – František Horčička, Czech history and portrait painter (born 1776)
- April 27 – Louis Joseph César Ducornet, French painter (used his feet) (born 1806)
- July 4 – István Ferenczy, Hungarian sculptor (born 1792)
- July 19 – Henry Aston Barker, Scottish landscape and panorama painter (born 1774)
- July 22 – Thomas Doughty, American landscape painter (born 1793)
- September 1 – Sir Richard Westmacott, English sculptor (born 1775)
- October – Rafael Tegeo, Spanish Neoclassical painter (born 1798)
- October 8 – Théodore Chassériau, French Romantic painter (born 1819)
- October 10 – Gim Jeong-hui, Korean calligrapher and artist (born 1786)
- October 25 – Naitō Toyomasa, Japanese sculptor of netsuke from Tanba Province (born 1773)
- October 28 – Johann Peter Krafft, German-Austrian painter (born 1780)
- November 4 – Hippolyte Delaroche, French painter (born 1797)
- November 6 – Cephas Thompson, American portrait painter (born 1775)
- November 13 – Ludwig Buchhorn, German painter and engraver (born 1770)
- November 21 – Charles de Steuben, French painter (born 1788)
- November 23 – Thomas Seddon, English landscape painter (born 1821)
- date unknown
  - Pieter Godfried Bertichen, Dutch painter and lithographer (born 1796)
  - Jean-Baptiste-Joseph Duchesne, French painter and miniaturist (born 1770)
  - Elisabeth Charlotta Karsten, Swedish and Russian painter (born 1789)
  - Frederick Nash, English painter and draughtsman (born 1782)
