= 1639 in art =

Events from the year 1639 in art.

== Events ==
- Rembrandt acquires a house in Jodenbreestraat, Amsterdam, now the Rembrandthuis museum.

== Paintings ==
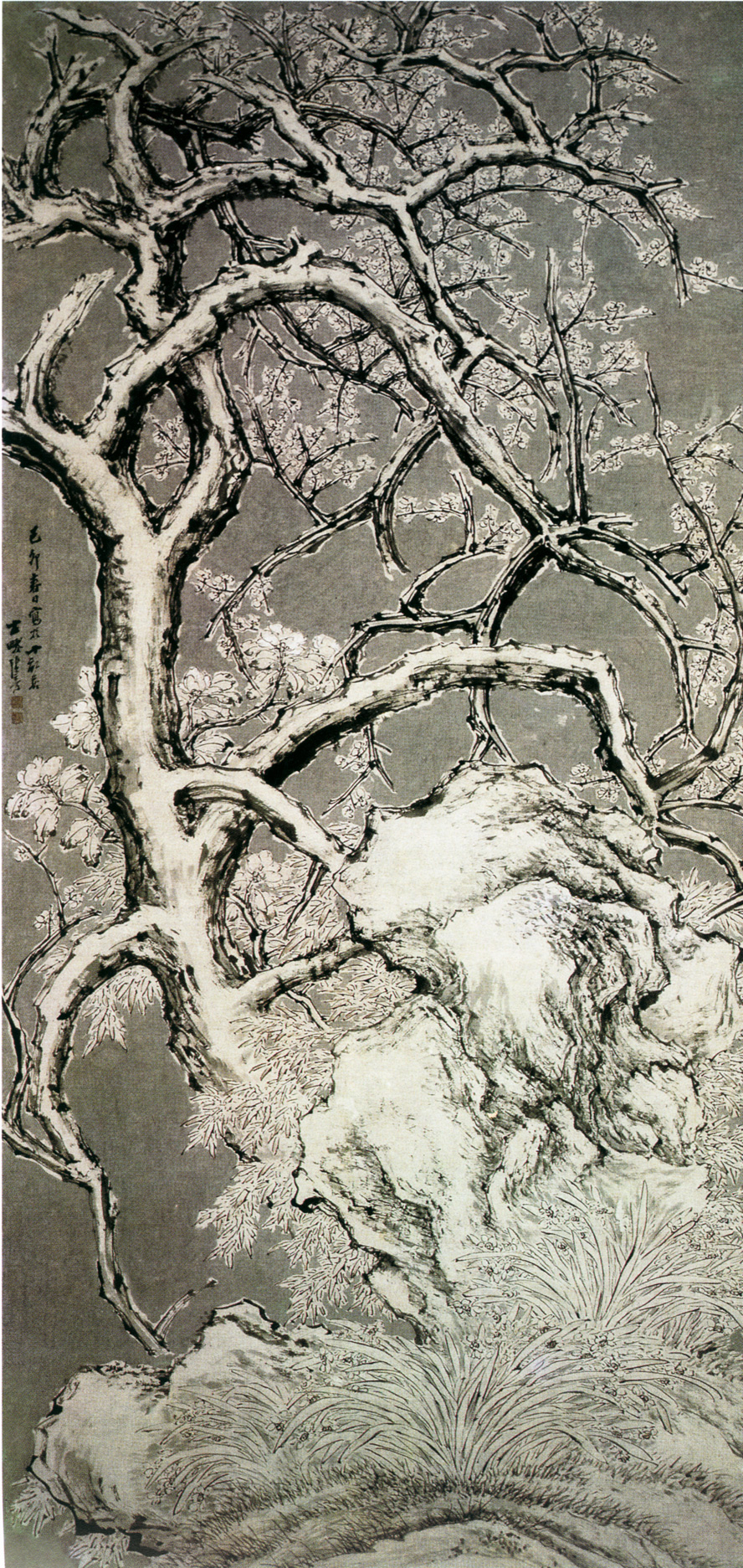
Zhang Yan - Plum Blossoms in Snow

- Claude Lorrain
  - Seaport at Sunset, sometimes referred to as View of a Seaport
  - Village Fête
- Pietro da Cortona - Allegory of Divine Providence and Barberini Power
- Artemisia Gentileschi - Self-Portrait as the Allegory of Painting
- Guido Reni - The Rape of Europa
- Jusepe de Ribera
  - Jacob’s Dream
  - Martyrdom of Saint Bartholomew, an example of Mannerism and especially the influence of Caravaggio on a contemporary of Francisco de Zurbarán in Spain.
- Peter Paul Rubens - The Three Graces
- Diego Velázquez
  - The Jester Calabacillas
  - The Lady with a Fan
- Zhang Yan - Plum Blossoms in Snow

== Births ==
- May 8 – Giovanni Battista Gaulli (known as Il Baciccio), Italian painter of High Baroque (died 1709)
- August 6 – Hans van Steenwinckel the Youngest, Danish sculptor and architect (died 1699)
- date unknown
  - Hendrik Abbé, Flemish engraver, painter, and architect (died unknown)
  - Claude Audran the Younger, French painter (died 1684)
  - Ignatius Croon, Flemish Baroque painter (died 1667)
  - Louis de Chastillon, French painter in enamel and miniature, and engraver (died 1734)
  - Dirck Ferreris, Dutch Golden Age painter (died 1693)
  - Abraham Myra, Finnish painter (died 1684)
  - Caspar Netscher, Dutch portrait and genre works painter (died 1684)
  - Bernardo Racchetti, Italian painter of imaginary vedute (died 1702)
  - Cristoforo Savolini, Italian painter of altarpieces (died 1677)
  - Gian Domenico Valentini, Italian painter of still lifes (died 1715)

== Deaths ==
- January 12 - Reinhold Timm, Danish painter and teacher (born unknown)
- February
  - Orazio Gentileschi, Italian Baroque Caravaggisti painter (born 1563)
  - Roelant Savery, Dutch Golden Age painter (born 1576)
- May 22 - Tiberio Tinelli, Italian painter of portraits of aristocracy, merchants, and intellectuals in Venice (born 1586)
- July 22 - Rutilio di Lorenzo Manetti, Italian Mannerist painter (born 1571)
- date unknown
  - Bernardino Capitelli, Italian painter and etcher (born 1589)
  - Chen Jiru, Chinese landscape painter and calligrapher during the Ming Dynasty (born 1558)
  - William Peake, English painter and printseller (born 1580)
  - Marcello Provenzale, Italian painter and mosaicist (born 1575)
  - Shōkadō Shōjō, Japanese Edo period Buddhist monk, painter, calligrapher and master of the tea ceremony (born 1584)
- probable Baldassare d'Anna – Italian painter of the late-Renaissance period (born 1560)
