= 1770 in art =

Events from the year 1770 in art.

== Events ==
- Anne Vallayer-Coster is admitted to the Académie royale de peinture et de sculpture at the age of twenty-six.

== Works ==
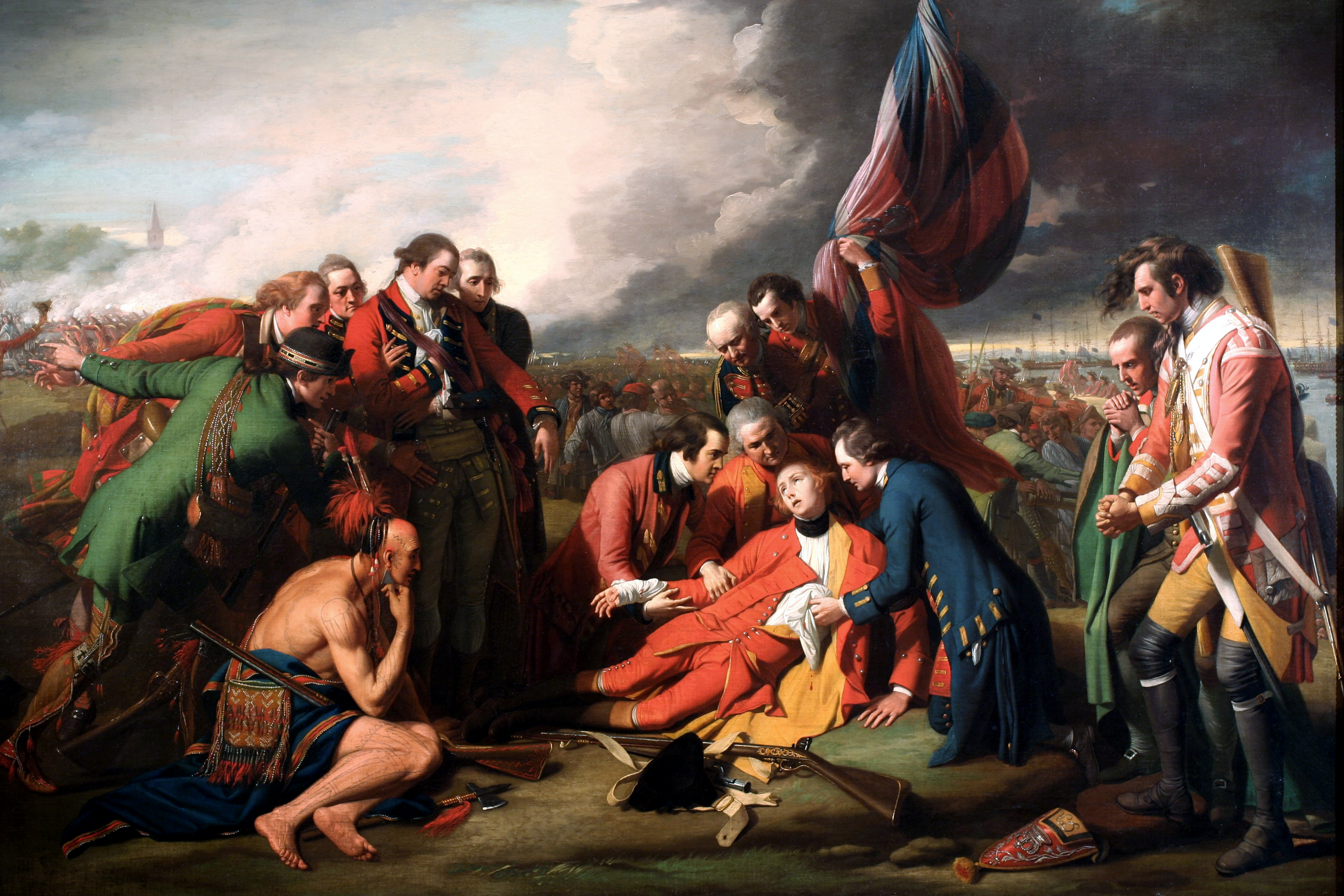
Benjamin West – The Death of General Wolfe

- Nathaniel Dance-Holland – Portrait of Robert Clive
- Thomas Gainsborough – approximate date
  - The Blue Boy
  - Portrait of David Garrick
  - Portrait of Thomas Linley the Elder
- Angelica Kauffman – Vortigern and Rowena
- Louis-Jean-François Lagrenée – The Spartan Mother
- Joshua Reynolds – Colonel Acland and Lord Sydney: The Archers
- Alexander Roslin
  - Portrait of the artist's wife (Marie-Suzanne Giroust)
  - Portrait of Prince Frederick Adolf of Sweden
- George Stubbs
  - A Horse Frightened by a Lion (Walker Art Gallery, Liverpool)
  - A Lion Attacking a Horse (Yale University Art Gallery)
- Giovanni Domenico Tiepolo – The Immaculate Conception with Saint Lawrence and Saint Francis of Paola (approximate date)
- Benjamin West
  - The Death of General Wolfe
  - The Oath of Hannibal
- Richard Wilson
  - Cicero and His Two Friends
  - On Hounslow Heath

== Births ==
- January 13 – Anatole Devosge, French painter (died 1850)
- February 12 – Jean-Jacques Karpff, French painter, designer and miniaturist (died 1829)
- February 21 – Antonio Pasini, Italian painter and manuscript illuminator (died 1845)
- March 12 – Karl August Senff, Baltic German painter, engraver and teacher (died 1838)
- c. March 25 – Alexander Carse, Scottish genre painter (died 1843)
- April 12 – George Clint, English portrait painter and engraver (died 1854)
- April 18 – Ludwig Buchhorn, German painter and engraver (died 1856)
- May 4 – François Gérard, Italian-born French painter (died 1837)
- June 1 – Michael Sigismund Frank, glass painter (died 1847)
- July 3 – Thomas Pardoe, English enameler noted for flower painting (died 1823)
- October 18 – Thomas Phillips, English portrait and subject painter (died 1845)
- November 15 – Louis Lafitte, French painter, designer, illustrator and muralist (died 1828)
- November 19 – Bertel Thorvaldsen, Danish sculptor (died 1844)
- November 30 – John Buckler, British draughtsman and engraver (died 1851)
- date unknown
  - Robert Cromek, English engraver, editor, art dealer and entrepreneur (died 1812)
  - Jean-Baptiste-Joseph Duchesne, French painter and miniaturist (died 1856)
  - Richard Duppa, English writer and a draughtsman (died 1831)
  - Julien-Joseph Ducorron, Belgian landscape painter (died 1848)
  - Johann Christian Eberlein, German painter (died 1815)
  - Johannes Jelgerhuis, painter and actor from the Northern Netherlands (died 1836)
  - Marie-Élisabeth Laville-Leroux, French painter (died 1826)
  - John Lewin, English-born Australian artist (died 1819)
  - Charles Balthazar Julien Févret de Saint-Mémin, portraitist and museum director (died 1852)
  - 1765/1770: Fryderyk Bauman, Polish architect and sculptor-decorator (died 1845)

== Deaths ==
- January 2 – Joseph Anton Feuchtmayer, German Rococo stuccoist and sculptor (born 1696)
- January 8 – John Michael Rysbrack, Flemish sculptor (born 1694)
- February 17 – Louis René Vialy, French painter (born 1680)
- March 5 – Gaetano Chiaveri, Italian Baroque architect and master builder, most notable for his work as part of the second phase of the Dresden Baroque (born 1689)
- March 23 – Martin van Meytens, Austrian portrait painter (born 1695)
- March 27
  - José Ramírez de Arellano, Spanish Baroque architect and sculptor (born 1705)
  - Giovanni Battista Tiepolo, Italian painter (born 1696)
- May 30 – François Boucher, French painter (born 1703)
- July 7 – Suzuki Harunobu, Japanese woodblock print artist, one of the most famous in the Ukiyo-e style (born 1724)
- July 16 – Francis Cotes, English painter (born 1726)
- November 1 – Gaspare Traversi, Italian painter (born c.1722)
- December 1 – Giambettino Cignaroli, Italian painter (born 1718)
- December 24 – Pierre-Philippe Mignot, French sculptor (born 1715)
- date unknown
  - Guillaume Philippe Benoist, French line engraver (born 1725)
  - Domenico Duprà, Italian rococo court painter (born 1689)
  - Isabel Jolís Oliver, Spanish printer and engraver (born 1682)
  - Giuseppe Pedretti, Italian painter of lunettes and altarpieces (born 1694)
  - Maria Felice Tibaldi, Italian painter (born 1707)
- probable
  - Apollonio Domenichini, Italian painter of vedute, active in Venice, between 1740 and 1770 (born 1715)
  - Susanna Drury, Irish painter chiefly noted for her watercolor drawings (born 1698)
  - Dimitrije Bačević, Serbian icon painter and muralist (born 1735).
