= 1715 in art =

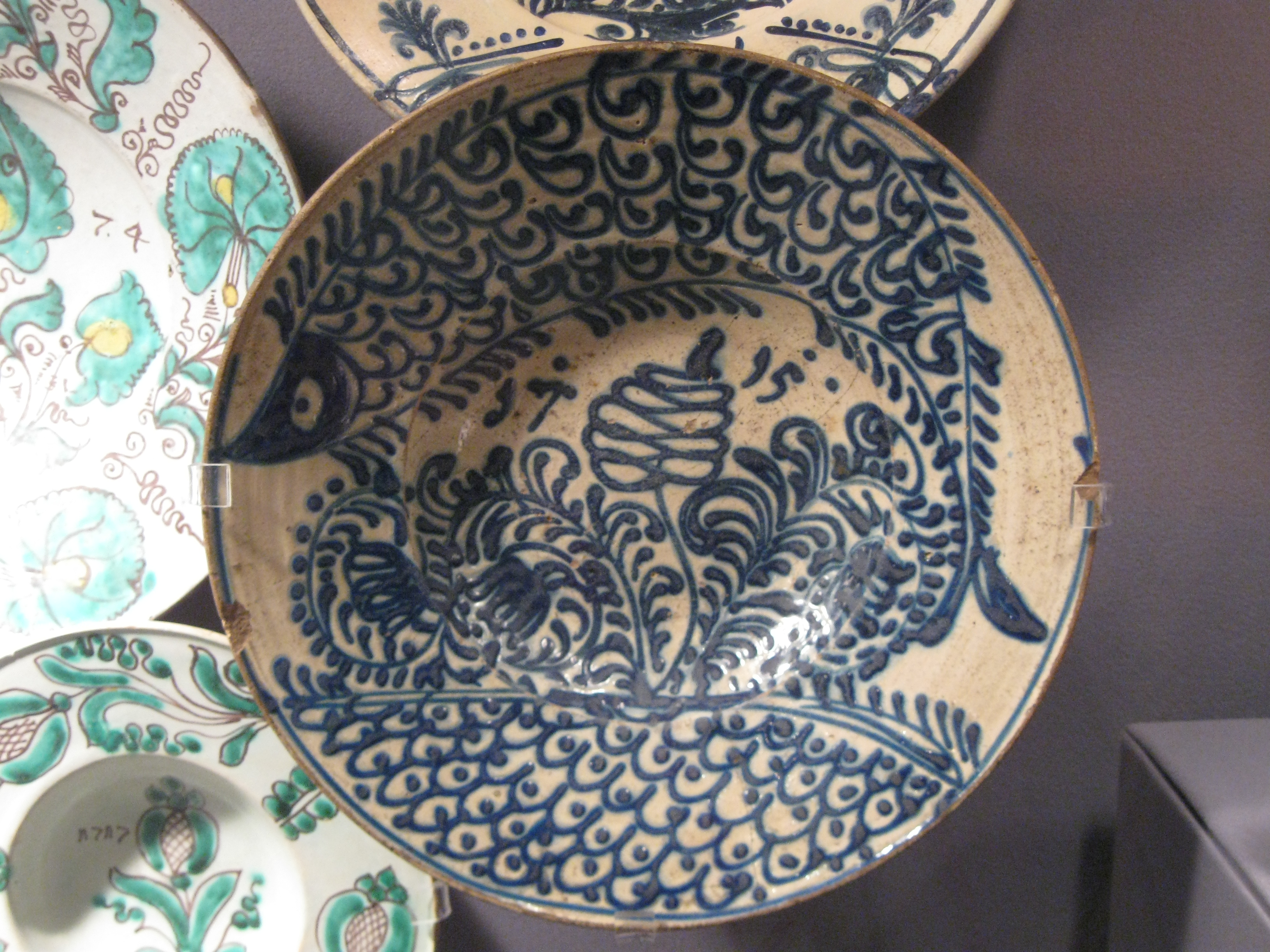
A 1715 Czech dish from Eger. This object is today located in the Koerner Gallery section of the UBC Museum of Anthropology in Vancouver, Canada.

Events from the year 1715 in art.

== Paintings ==
- Thomas Gibson – Portrait of George Vertue
- Sir Godfrey Kneller – Portraits of
  - John Erskine, Earl of Mar
  - Frances Erskine Countess of Mar
  - Lady Anne, Countess of Sunderland and her daughter Diana
  - Charles Talbot, Duke of Shrewsbury
- Rachel Ruysch – Bouquet of Flowers (Alte Pinakothek, Munich)

== Births ==
- February 22 – Charles-Nicolas Cochin, French engraver, designer, writer, and art critic (died 1790)
- July 4 – Charles Francois Hutin, French history and figure painter, engraver and sculptor (died 1776)
- July 11 – Jean-Joseph Balechou, French engraver (died 1765)
- August 25 – Luis González Velázquez, Spanish late-Baroque painter (died 1763)
- November 5 – Johann Georg Wille, German copper engraver (died 1808)
- November 30 – Johan Jacob Bruun, Danish gouache painter most known for his topographic prospects (died 1789)
- December 11 – Johann Valentin Tischbein, German theatre painter (died 1768)
- probable
  - Pierre-Philippe Mignot, French sculptor (died 1770)
  - Jean-Baptiste Perronneau, French painter who specialized in portraits executed in pastels (died 1783)
  - Gervase Spencer, English miniaturist (died 1763)
  - Cao Xueqin – Chinese writer, painter and poet (died 1763)

== Deaths ==
- January 5 – Onorio Marinari, Italian painter (born 1627)
- March 11 – Jan-Erasmus Quellinus, Flemish Baroque painter of large altarpieces and histories (born 1634)
- June 12 – Angelo de Rossi, sculptor (born 1671)
- September 1 – Francois Girardon, French sculptor (born 1628)
- November 16 - Jacques d'Agar, French portrait painter (born 1640)
- date unknown
  - Filippo Abbiati, Italian painter of the Baroque period (born 1640)
  - Derviş Ali, Ottoman calligrapher (born unknown)
  - François Boitard, French painter (born 1670)
  - Elizabeth Haselwood, English silversmith (born c. 1644)
  - Philippe Magnier, French sculptor (born 1647)
  - Michelangelo Ricciolino, Italian church painter of the Baroque period (born 1654)
  - Gian Domenico Valentini, Italian painter of still life (born 1639)
  - Wang Yuanqi, Chinese painter of the Qing dynasty, member of the Four Wangs (born 1642)
  - Yun Tusŏ, Korean painter and scholar of the Joseon period (born 1668)
  - 1710/1715: Jean Cornu, French sculptor (born 1650)
