= The Jester Calabacillas =

The Jester Calabacillas may refer to:

- The Jester Calabacillas (Madrid), a portrait by Velázquez of Don Juan Martín Martín, in the Prado Museum
- The Jester Calabacillas (Cleveland), a 1626-1632 painting by Diego Velázquez, in the Cleveland Museum of Art
