= Blanche-Lucie Thurot =

French painter

Blanche-Lucie Hoguer-Thurot (French: [blɑ̃ʃ lysi tyʁo]; 1786 – 1872) was a French genre and portrait painter active in Paris during the first half of the 19th century. Trained under the Neoclassical painter Jean-Baptiste Regnault, she exhibited regularly at the Paris Salons between 1810 and 1831.

== Life ==
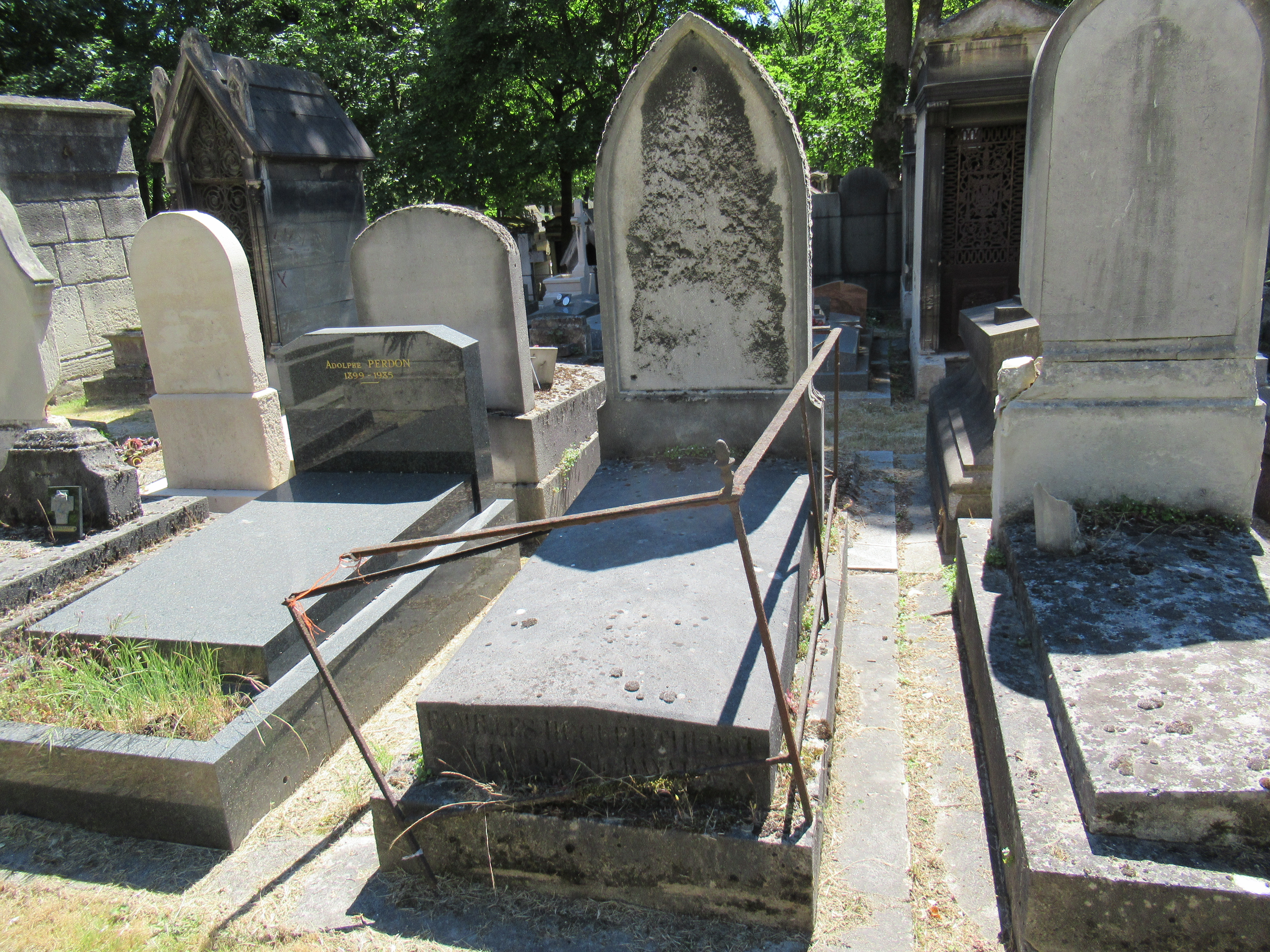
Sepulture at the Cimetière Montmartre

Blanche-Lucie Hoguer was born on 30 April 1786 in Versailles. She was the daughter of Pierre Hoguer, a merchant and trader, and Etiennette Sophie Saladin. Belonging to an artistic family, her younger sister was Adélaïde Hoguer, known for her porcelain painting at the Manufacture de Sèvres, while her great-aunt was the writer Victoire Babois.

Hoguer trained in Paris under Jean-Baptiste Regnault, one of the leading academic painters of the Napoleonic period, before making her debut at the Salon in 1810. On 16 January 1822, she married Alexandre-Pierre Thurot, a typesetter and rentier. The couple had two children, François-Charles-Eugène Thurot and Marie-Eugénie-Cécile Thurot.

In addition to her exhibition career, Hoguer-Thurot was active as a private instructor in drawing and painting in Paris, offering lessons from her studio on rue de Rivoli.

Blanche-Lucie Hoguer-Thurot died in Paris on 13 January 1872, at the age of 85.

== Career ==
Blanche-Lucie Hoguer-Thurot worked in Paris as a painter of genre scenes, portraits, and coloured drawings, maintaining a studio for many years on rue Jacob in Saint-Germain-des-Près. She made her Salon debut in 1810 with a sentimental genre painting depicting a young girl seated by a stream, reflecting on the fleeting nature of beauty as rose petals drifted away in the current. The work measured approximately 6 by 4 pieds.

At the 1812 Salon, she exhibited several portraits, including a full-length portrait of a woman in her study and Sully considérant l’image de Henri IV (Sully considering the image of Henry 4th), the latter of which was shown again in 1814 and later reproduced as a lithograph by Jacob. In 1814 she also exhibited a portrait of a child.

In 1824, she presented a painting of Saint Gertrude, which was later shown in 1830 at the Musée du Luxembourg. She continued to exhibit historical and devotional subjects, including a painting of Joan of Arc in 1831, alongside a portrait of a woman.

Because both Blanche-Lucie and her sister Adélaïde exhibited at the Salon under the name Mademoiselle Hoguer, their works are sometimes confused, including by Émile Bellier de La Chavignerie in his dictionary of French artists.

Hoguer-Thurot's paintings were also accepted by the Musée de Lille, where she received a bronze medal, and by the Galerie Lebrun, known for charitable exhibitions supporting the relief of poverty.
