= The Far Islands and Other Cold Places =

Book by Elizabeth Taylor

- Author: Elizabeth Taylor
- Language: English
- Genre: Non-fiction
- Publication date: 1997
- ISBN: 1-880654-11-3

The Far Islands and Other Cold Places (ISBN 1-880654-11-3) is a collection of travel essays by painter Elizabeth Taylor on her trips through Norway, Scotland, the Faroe Islands, Greenland, Canada and Alaska. The essays were written between 1888 and 1919. The collection was republished in 1997 by Pogo Press.
