= Lorenzo Sears =

American historian and biographer

- Born: April 18, 1838
- Died: February 29, 1916 (aged 77)
- Occupations: Historian, biographer
- Partner: Adeline Harris Sears

Lorenzo Sears (April 18, 1838 – February 29, 1916) was an American historian and biographer.

He was born in Searsville, Massachusetts (part of Williamsburg). He graduated from Yale College in 1861 and from the General Theological Seminary, New York in 1864. He was rector of various Episcopalian parishes in New England until 1885. From 1885 to 1903 he served as professor at the University of Vermont (1885–88) and at Brown University (1890–1903).

His wife was the textile artist Adeline Harris Sears.

== Books ==
- The History of Oratory (1896)
- Principles and Methods of Literary Criticism (1898)
- American Literature in its Colonial and National Periods (1902)
- The Makers of American Literature (1904)
- Wendell Phillips (1909)
- John Hancock (1912)
- John Hay (1914)
