= Many happy returns =

Birthday or winter holiday greeting

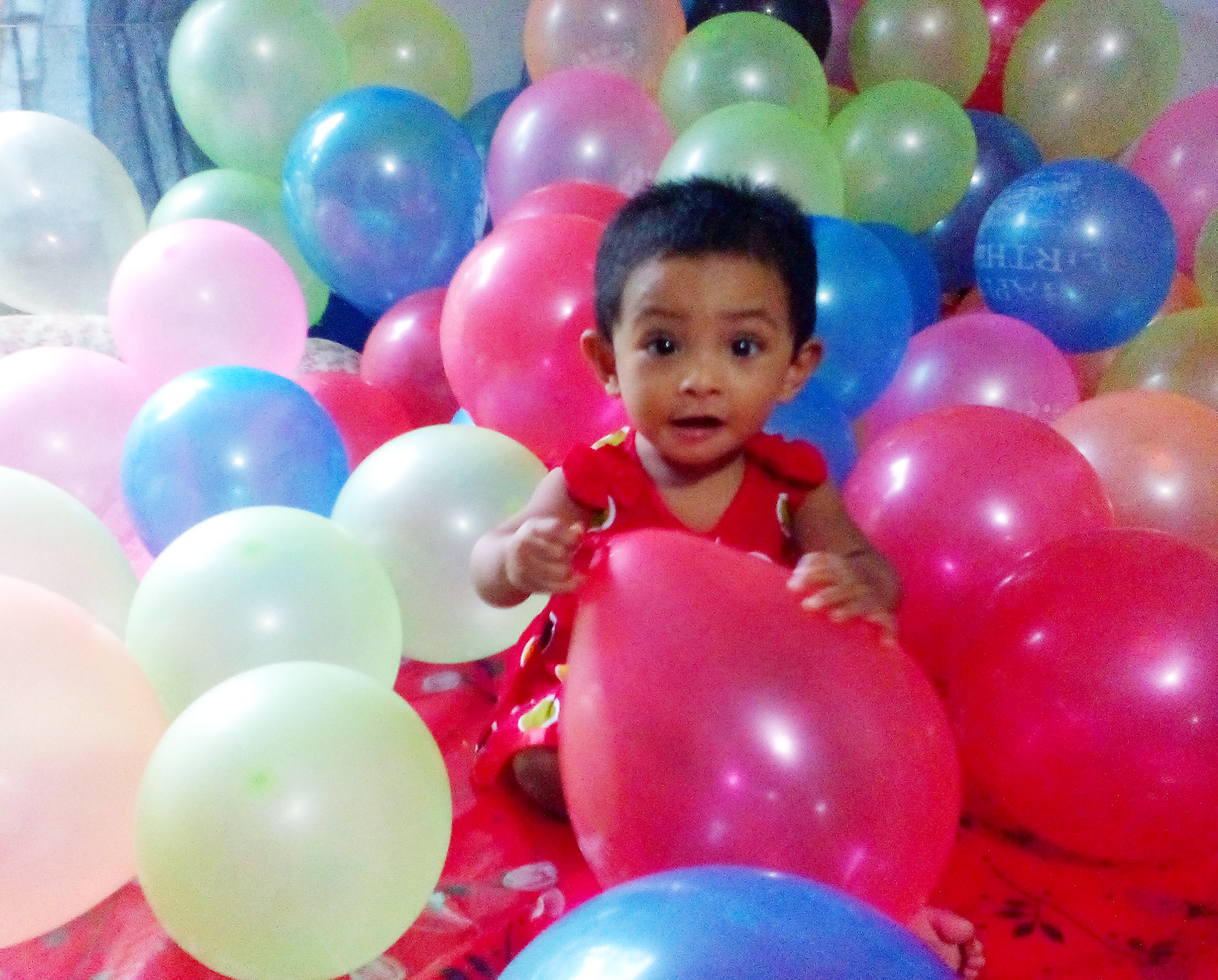
One year baby playing with birthday balloons; one could say “many happy returns” as a salutation

"Many happy returns" is a greeting which is used by some on birthdays, and by others in response to "Merry Christmas" and "Happy New Year". Since the 18th century this has been used as a salutation to offer the hope that a happy day being marked would recur many more times. It is now primarily used, by some, on birthdays. Prior to the mid-19th century, it was used at any celebratory or festive event. The phrase is more common in British English, Indian English, Hiberno English and to some degree in Canadian English than in American English.

Current usage is often as a more formal option than "Happy Birthday". It is also often found on greetings cards.

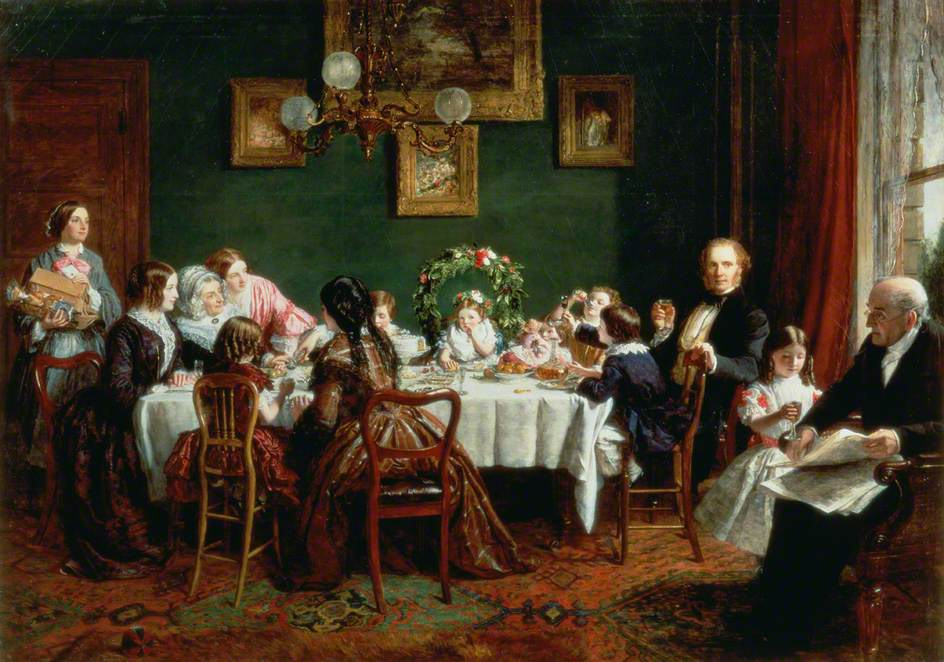
Many Happy Returns of the Day by William Powell Frith, 1856

Its earliest attributable use was by Lady Newdigate in a letter written in 1789 (and published in Newdigate-Newdegate Cheverels in 1898)

Many happy returns of þ^{e} day to us my D^{r} Love

The letter was written in London on 31 May 1789 by Hester Margaretta, Lady Newdigate, to her husband, Sir Roger Newdigate, 5th Baronet, and refers to a wish for their wedding day.

A much earlier reference is found in Joseph Addison's newspaper The Freeholder:

The usual Salutation to a Man upon his Birth-day among the ancient Romans was Multos & foelices; in which they wished him many happy Returns of it.

An alternative explanation is that "returns" here is used in the sense of "yield" or "profit", as in "investment returns". Therefore, "many happy returns of the day" would be a wishing a person a rewarding day, full of happiness. This use has been traced back to Joseph Addison in 1716.
