= Victoire Babois =

French poet (1760–1839)

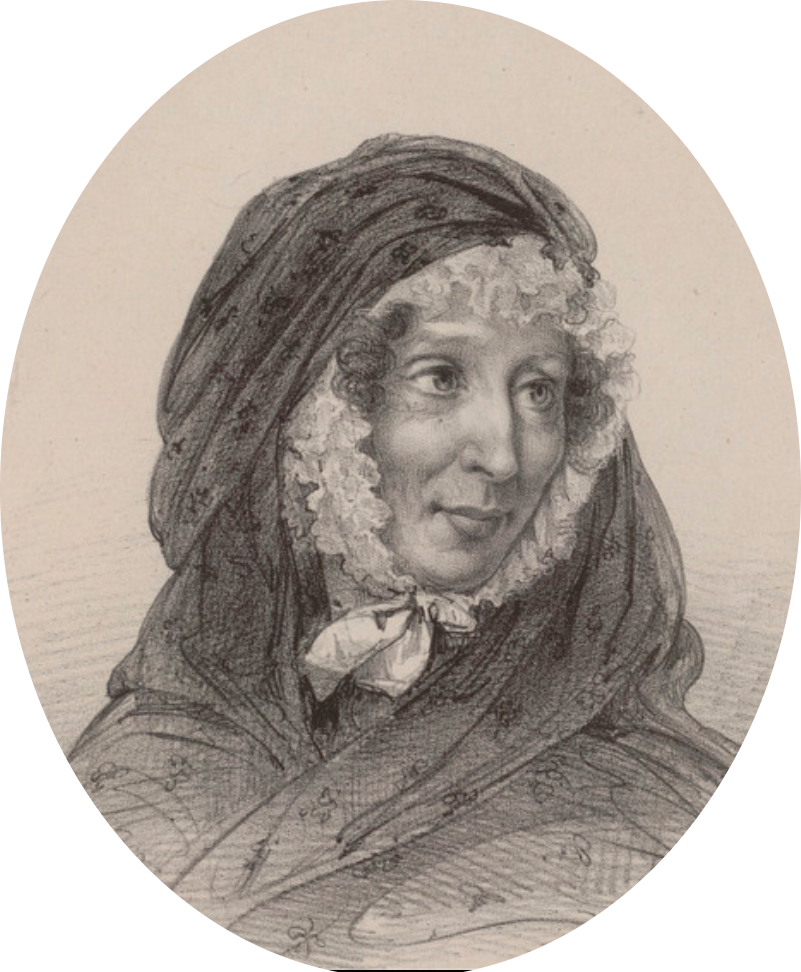
- Born: 6 October 1760; Versailles, France
- Died: 18 March 1839 (aged 78); Paris, France
- Relatives: Jean-François Ducis (uncle)
- Writing career
- Language: French
- Genre: Elegy

Victoire Babois, also known as Victoire-Magueritte Babois (6 October 1760 – 18 March 1839), was a French poet and writer of elegies. Married in 1780, she suffered tragedy when her five-year-old daughter Blanche died in 1792. This experience led her to write an elegy to her daughter, which, encouraged by her uncle Jean-François Ducis, she published in 1804. The collection of poems was reprinted six times in the following six years, and influenced other French poets, including Marceline Desbordes-Valmore and Alphonse de Lamartine. She published other collections of elegies, including political works that commented on contemporary events like the Napoleonic Wars. She died on 8 March 1839 and is buried in Paris.

== Biography ==
Babois was born in Versailles on 6 October 1760, the only daughter of Jean-Baptiste and Magueritte, née Lapoulide. She was known by the forename Victoire-Magueritte and Victoire. She received very little education, although she later recalled enjoying reading Jean Racine. She married Jacques-Nicolas Gosset in 1780. However, her only child, a girl named Blanche, died in 1792 at the age of five. After this, her marriage did not last and she separated from her husband and divorced in 1793.

This experience of tragedy inspired her to write poetry. Her uncle, Jean-François Ducis, encouraged her to publish and her first anthology of elegies was published in 1804. The poems, a response to the death of her daughter, proved very popular and were reprinted six times before 1810. Meanwhile, she had met the poet Jean-Jacques Karpff in 1806, who subsequently lodged with her until his death in 1829.

She became increasingly well known in literate circles for her elegies and, in 1815, published an elegy on the death of Ducis. He wrote of her, "Née pour être amante, épouse, mère et patriote passionnée, pour être excellente fille, fidèle et généreuse amie, vous avez dû souffrir beaucoup. Telle a été votre destinée. Mais, votre douleur maternelle, confiée à vos éloquentes élégies, vivra longtemps dans vos vers." ("Born to be a lover, wife, mother and passionate patriot, to be an excellent daughter, a faithful and generous friend, you must have suffered a lot. Such has been your destiny. But, your maternal grief, enshrined in your eloquent elegies, will live forever in your verse.")

Babois was also known for other publications. Her letters to her brother as a child has proved a useful source of contemporary information on female education at the time. She also wrote political elegies, which were collated towards the end of her life. These included comments on her negative experiences of meeting English soldiers during the Napoleonic Wars. She influenced other French poets, including Marceline Desbordes-Valmore and Alphonse de Lamartine. She died in Paris on 8 March 1839 and is buried beside Karpff in Père Lachaise Cemetery in Paris.

== Writing ==
Babois wrote elegies, which were published in collections during her lifetime.

- Élégies sur la mort de sa fille âgée de cinq ans (Elegies on the death of a five-year-old daughter), 1804
- Élégies maternelles (Maternal Elegies), 1810
- Élégies et poésies diverses (Various poems and elegies), 1810
- Élégie sur la mort de Ducis, membre de l'Institut royal de France (Elegy on the death of Ducis, member of the Royal Institute of France), 1816.
- Épître aux romantiques (Letter to the Romantics), 1830
- Élégies nationales (National elegies), 1836
