= Jean-Jacques Karpff =

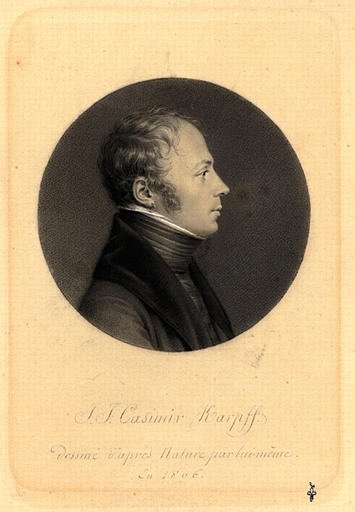
Self-portrait by Jean-Jacques Karpff, Musée Condé, 1806

Jean-Jacques Casimir Karpff (Colmar, 12 February 1770 - Versailles, 24 March 1829) was a French painter, designer and miniaturist.

Pupil of François Joseph Hohr in Colmar, Karpff went to Paris in 1790. Legend has it that when he appeared in Jacques-Louis David's studio, one of his future classmates, judging Karpff unpronounceable David gave him the nickname of "Casimir". In 1795, he returned to Colmar where he taught drawing in the new school of fine arts and specialized in monochrome portraits. In 1806, he was summoned to Saint-Cloud to paint the portrait of the Empress Josephine, which earned him some success. He became the hosted guest of the poet Victoire Babois, where in Versailles lived the rest of his life. Karpff was buried in Père Lachaise Cemetery (27th Division).
