= Hendrik Abbé =

Flemish artist

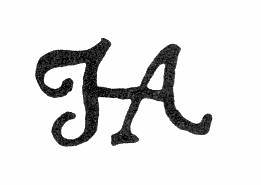
scanned copy of one of the styles of Hendrik Abbé's signature

Hendrik Abbé was a Flemish painter, engraver and architect.

== Life ==
Abbé was baptized in 1639 in the cathedral at Antwerp. Some prints by him were published in Antwerp in 1670. An edition of Ovid's Metamorpheses, published by Francois Foppens in Brussels in 1677, was partly illustrated with plates by other engravers after drawings by Abbé.
