= Moorish Woman Leaving the Bath =

Painting by Théodore Chassériau

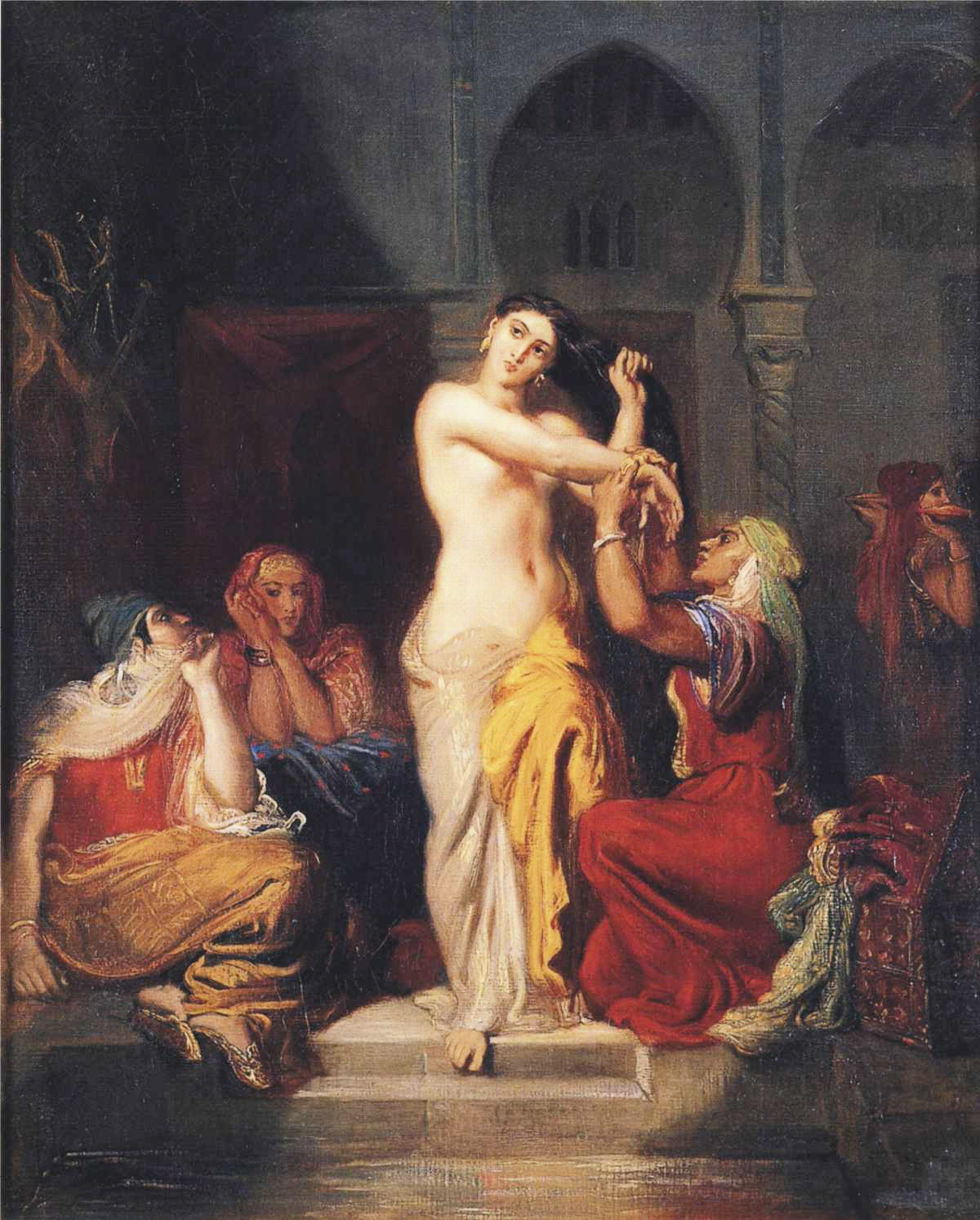
- Artist: Théodore Chassériau
- Year: 1856
- Type: Oil on canvas, genre painting
- Dimensions: 67 cm × 54 cm (26 in × 21 in)
- Location: Musée des Beaux-Arts, Strasbourg

Moorish Woman Leaving the Bath (French: Femme mauresque sortant du bain) is an 1856 oil painting by the French artist Théodore Chassériau. Orientalist in tone, it combines element of genre painting and nude art. It depicts a young woman of the harem drying herself after a bath. It is sometimes known by the alternative title Interior of a Harem, a title also given to a painting Chassériau produced earlier in the decade. It has been in the collection of the Louvre since, but has been on long-term loan to the Musée des Beaux-Arts de Strasbourg.

== Bibliography ==
- Guégan, Stéphane. Théodore Chassériau, 1819–1856: The Unknown Romantic. Metropolitan Museum of Art, 2002.
- Sandoz, Marc Théodore Chassériau, 1819–1856: Catalogue raisonné des peintures et estampes. 1974.
