= Adeline Harris Sears =

American quiltmaker (1839–1931)

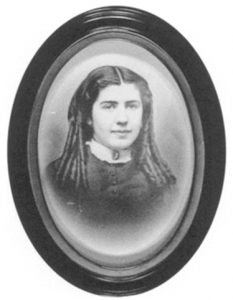
- Born: Adeline Harris; 7 Apr 1839; Arcadia, Rhode Island
- Died: 10 May 1931 (aged 92); Providence, Rhode Island
- Known for: Textile arts

Adeline Harris Sears (1839–1931) was an American quilter.

== Personal life ==
Harris Sears was born in Arcadia, Rhode Island, in 1839, the youngest child of James Toleration Harris and Sophia Knight. Her wealthy family owned a number of textile mills. She married the clergyman and professor of literature Lorenzo Sears (1838–1916) in 1866. They had four children, only one of whom, Sophie, survived to adulthood. Harris Sears is buried in Rhode Island.

== Quilt ==
Harris Sears's most famous work is a signature quilt. Begun in 1856 when she was seventeen and finished around 1867, the quilt includes the autographs on top of the blocks of many known celebrities and politicians of the day including the writers Ralph Waldo Emerson, Charles Dickens, Washington Irving, Nathaniel Hawthorne, Henry Wadsworth Longfellow, Julia Ward Howe, Harriet Beecher Stowe, William Cullen Bryant, and eight United States Presidents; Abraham Lincoln, Andrew Johnson, Martin Van Buren, John Tyler, Millard Fillmore, Franklin Pierce, James Buchanan, and Ulysses S. Grant. According to family tradition, Harris Sears acquired Abraham Lincoln's signature in person, and may have danced with Lincoln at his inauguration ball. The quilt contains 360 blocks with signatures, and 1840 pieces of silk of 150 different patterns and colours.

The editor of Godey's Lady's Book, Sarah Josepha Hale, wrote with admiration of the quilt:

In short, we think this autograph bedquilt may be called a very wonderful invention in the way of needlework. The mere mechanical part, the number of small pieces, stitches neatly taken and accurately ordered; the arranging properly and joining nicely 2780 delicate bits of various beautiful and costly fabrics, is a task that would require no small share of resolution, patience, firmness, and perseverance. Then comes the intellectual part, the taste to assort colors and to make the appearance what it ought to be, where so many hundreds of shades are to be matched and suited to each other. After that we rise to the moral, when human deeds are to live in names, the consideration of the celebrities, who are to be placed each, the centre of his or her own circle! To do this well requires a knowledge of books and life, and an instinctive sense of the fitness of things, so as to assign each name its suitable place in this galaxy of stars or diamonds.

The quilt was acquired by the Metropolitan Museum of Art in 1995. It featured in the 2021–22 Anna Wintour Costume Center exhibition "In America: Lexicon of Fashion" at the Met, and provided the inspiration for its interior architectural display design.
