= The Three Graces (Rubens, Madrid) =

Painting by Peter Paul Rubens

- Artist: Peter Paul Rubens
- Year: 1630–35
- Dimensions: 221 cm × 181 cm (87 in × 71 in)
- Location: Museo del Prado; Madrid

The Three Graces is an oil painting of the Three Graces by Peter Paul Rubens.

The painting was held in the personal collection of the artist until his death, then was purchased by king Philip IV of Spain and in 1666 it went to the Royal Alcazar of Madrid, before hanging in the Museo del Prado.

There were other variations by Rubens on the theme of Three Graces. Physical dimensions of this painting are 221 cm × 181 cm (87 in × 71 in) without frame.
