= Michael Sigismund Frank =

German painter

Michael Sigismund Frank (1 June 1770 – 16 January 1847) was a Catholic artist and rediscoverer of the lost art of glass-painting.

Frank was born in Nuremberg. His father was a dealer in provisions, living in comfortable circumstances, who destined his son to become his successor in business. But these plans were thwarted by Sigismund's fondness for art. The mother, without her husband's knowledge, had him instructed in drawing in the local academy.

Having lost his father in early youth, Frank was apprenticed to his godfather Neubert, who carried on at Nuremberg the business of lacquering and decorating wooden boxes and caskets. His progress in this work was rapid, but he stayed less than a year with Neubert. After returning to the house of his mother, who had married a second time, he once more devoted himself to the study of drawing, meantime painting boxes for other manufacturers at Nuremberg and earning enough to pay his expenses. On completing his twenty-first year his parents induced him against his inclination to wed Marie H. Blechkoll, the daughter of a hotel-keeper who brought him as her dowry the inn Zur Himmelsleiter. He continued his art studies while his wife managed the hotel. However, he now turned his attention to painting porcelain, to which art one of his guests, the porcelain-painter Trost, had introduced him. His success was immediate, and when, after a married life of five years, his wife died, he sold the hotel and established a porcelain factory. The undertaking, which brought him a good income, led him to travel in Austria, Hungary, and Turkey; in Vienna he made the acquaintance of several prominent artists, under whose instruction he trained as a colourist.

== Glass-painting ==
At the beginning of the nineteenth century, however, when Western Germany repeatedly became the scene of French invasions, Frank's business interests suffered severely. It was then that his attention turned in a wholly new direction. At the shop of a business friend named Wirth he met an Englishman to whom Wirth sold some fragments of ancient coloured glass for what seemed to Frank a large sum. On inquiry he found that the high price paid was because the art of painting in glass which had been coloured while molten - an art which had produced so many church and palace windows during the Middle Ages and the early Renaissance - had been entirely lost during the eighteenth century. Frank determined to recover the lost secret of this art. Unaided and untaught, he worked for several years to accomplish his purpose; his savings fast disappeared, and his success seemed more and more doubtful. His friends expressed fears that he would become a financial and mental wreck, and urged him to give up his efforts.

But Frank persevered, and in 1804 there came a turn in his fortunes. He had found at last the method of producing coloured glass which he had so long sought. His first commission was to paint the coat of arms of the Rhenish Count Schenk, for his chapel in Greifenstein in Franconia. When this glass-painting was seen by the travelling agent of a London art house named Rauh, a Nuremberger like Frank himself, he felt at once that Frank's work was comparable to the ancient glass-painting the secret of which had been lost. He hastened to Nuremberg, saw Frank, and made business arrangements with him. Frank now made several hundred pieces for the English market, some of which made their way to Philadelphia and Baltimore. But the disappearance of Rauh in 1807 put an end to Frank's prosperity and might have had serious consequences had not King Maximilian I of Bavaria become the artist's patron (1808).

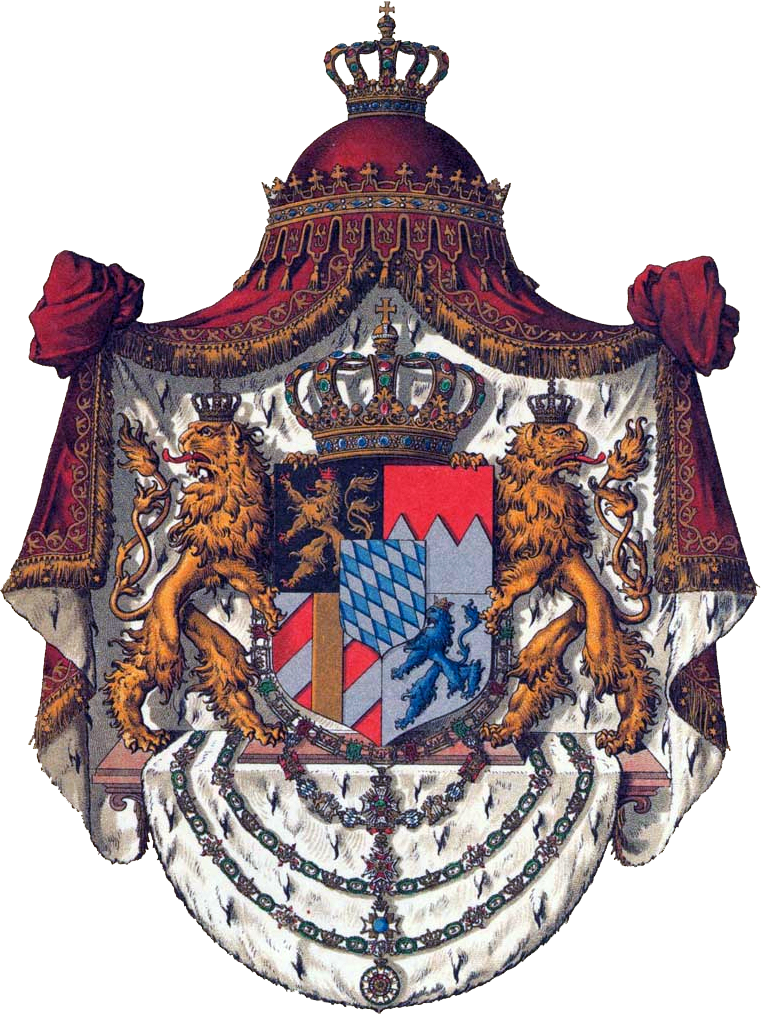
Coat of arms of the Kingdom of Bavaria

Frank's execution of the royal Bavarian coat of arms made a good impression on the king and the latter not only paid him generously, but turned over to him for factory purposes the building called the Zwinger, in Nuremberg. Henceforth Frank produced many works for King Maximilian, such as the Circumcision, after Hendrick Goltzius; the Nativity; the Passion, six parts after Lucas van Leyden; the Mosque of Cordoba; St. Barbara, after Holbein; the Judgment of Solomon, after Raphael; the Magi, after Rubens. For King Louis I, also, Frank executed many commissions, especially the glass decorations of the cathedral of Ratisbon.

In 1818 Maximilian appointed Frank painter in glass at the royal porcelain factory in Munich, with a salary of 800 florins annually. When, in 1827, Maximilian's successor established the royal institute for glass-painting, Frank was entrusted with all the arrangements and with the technical management, particularly with the preparation of the colours to be used and the manufacture of the coloured glass plates. He was also charged with instructing assistants in the secrets of his craft. Here he worked until 1840 when he retired with an annual pension of 1200 florins. He died, aged 76, in Munich.

He was the father of many children, of whom the most prominent was the historical painter Julius Frank. Among his friends were the physicist Fraunhofer and the Viennese glass-painter Molin, who praised Frank's colouring, especially his reds and his flesh colour.

== See also ==
- List of German painters

== Sources ==
- cites
  - Mitteilungen des Verbandes deutscher Glasmalerei (Munich, 1907);
  - VON SCHADEN in his Skizzen (Munich, 1829).
