= The Jester Calabacillas (Cleveland) =

1626–1632 painting by Diego Velázquez

Portrait of the Jester Calabazas
- Artist: Diego Velázquez
- Year: 1630s
- Medium: oil paint, canvas
- Dimensions: 175 cm (69 in) × 106 cm (42 in)
- Location: Cleveland Museum of Art, Doughty House
- Collection: Cook collection
- Identifiers: Bildindex der Kunst und Architektur ID: 00075480

The Jester Calabacillas (Spanish - El bufón Calabacillas) is a 1626-1632 oil on canvas painting by Diego Velázquez, now in the Cleveland Museum of Art. Its attribution is based on stylistic similarities to other works by the artist - for example, José López-Rey sees similarities in the treatment of the face in this work and that of Bacchus in The Triumph of Bacchus. Its subject is thought to be the jester Juan Calebasse, also painted by the artist in a work now in Madrid and a now-lost work entitled "calebasses in a turban", the latter recorded in 1642 and 1655 inventories of Diego Felipez de Guzmán's collection.

It probably originated in the Buen Retiro Palace before being seized after the French occupation of Spain in 1808. The work was exhibited at a retrospective on the artist in Paris in 1866, at which time it was owned by the Duke of Persigny. After passing through other hands, it was sold at auction at Christie's in London in 1965 for 170,000 guineas, passing to its present owner later the same year.

== Attribution ==
José López-Rey dates it to 1628-1629 (before the painter's firsts trip to Italy in August 1629) and links it to a portrait with this title mentioned in a 1701 inventory of works in the Buen Retiro Palace along with five "other portraits [of jesters] of the same dimensions and quality as that of Cabaçillas, with a portrait in one hand and a billet [piece of paper] in the other". Although the Cleveland work instead holds a small toy windmill in his left hand, López-Rey argues that that was the result of transcription error by the copyist. A 1789 inventory of the palace's works mentions a "portrait of Velasquillo the jester" as well as stating "the old inventory states it to be of Calavacillas with a portrait in one hand and a windmill [in the other]". Julián Gállego argues that what the subject is holding in his left hand is not a windmill but a small arrow or a 'banderilla'. However, on his visit to the palace Antonio Ponz referred to it as a windmill despite some doubts as to its attribution to Velázquez. It was the only painting of a jester still held there and the only one he described - he found it with other paintings in a small room then serving as an antechamber, describing it as "the happy jester with a paper windmill and something in his own hand, to Velázquez's taste".

Leo Steinberg instead attributes the work to Alonso Cano and the painting's subject and attribution are also doubted by Elizabeth du Gué Trapier and Jonathan Brown. They note the difference between the work's dimensions and those of the works in the inventories (two and a half aunes high, just over 2 metres) and the decolletage of the woman in the miniature portrait, closer to the style of the reign of Charles II of Spain, though the latter discrepancy is explained by the museum as a later addition. It is also argued that 'Calabacillas' only entered Philip IV of Spain's service in 1632 and that - combined with the construction dates of the Buen Retiro Palace and the work's homogenous brushstrokes - the work cannot have been painted in 1628-1629 as López-Rey argues. However, the paint surface has been badly affected by a later re-stretching of the canvas and it is possible its subject may be Velasquillo as in the 1789 inventory. According to 1637 documents on court personnel, Velasquillo may have been the 'stage name' of a jester born Cristóbal Velázquez. Brown has reiterated his refusal to accept the attribution to Vélasquez due to stylistic reasons, the "slightly amorphous" architecture in the background, the uniform brushwork and the heavy execution of certain parts of the work such as the right hand.

== See also ==
- List of works by Diego Velázquez

== Bibliography ==
- (in Spanish) Jonathan Brown, Velázquez. Pintor y cortesano, Madrid, Alianza Editorial, 1986 (ISBN 84-206-9031-7)
- (in Spanish) Jonathan Brown, Escritos completos sobre Velázquez, Madrid, Centro de Estudios Europa Hispánica, 2008 (ISBN 978-84-9360-605-3)
- (in Spanish) Velázquez, exhibition catalogue, Prado Museum, Madrid, 1990 (ISBN 84-87317-01-4)
- (in Spanish) El Palacio del Rey Planeta. Felipe IV y el Buen Retiro, exhibition catalogue, Prado Museum, Madrid, 2005 (ISBN 84-8480-081-4)
- (in Spanish) J. M. Pita Andrade, Corpus velazqueño. Documentos y textos, vol. 2, Madrid, 2000 (ISBN 84-369-3347-8)
- José López-Rey, Velázquez. Catalogue raisonné, vol. II, Cologne, Taschen Wildenstein Institute, 1996 (ISBN 3-8228-8731-5)
- (in Spanish) Miguel Morán Turina and Isabel Sánchez Quevedo, Velázquez. Catálogo completo, Madrid, Akal SA, 1999 (ISBN 84-460-1349-5)
