= Zhang Yan (Ming dynasty) =

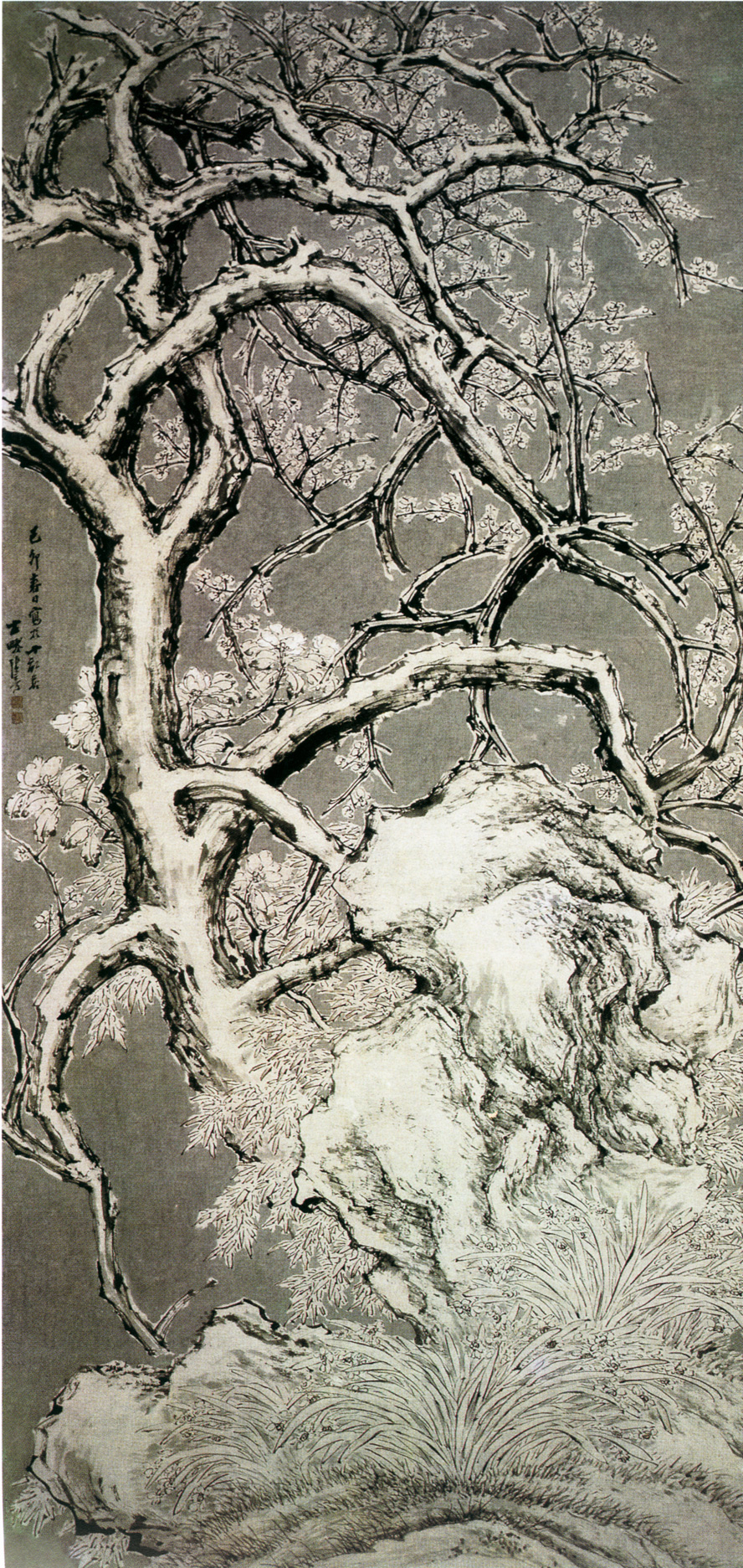
Plum Blossoms in Snow (雪景梅花图), Zhang Yan, Suzhou Museum

Zhang Yan (Chinese: 张彦), courtesy name as Bomei, sobriquet as Wuzheng Daoren, was a Chinese painter during the Ming Dynasty, active in 16th and 17th centuries.

He was from Jiading, Jiangsu.
