= Many Happy Returns of the Day =

Painting by William Powell Frith

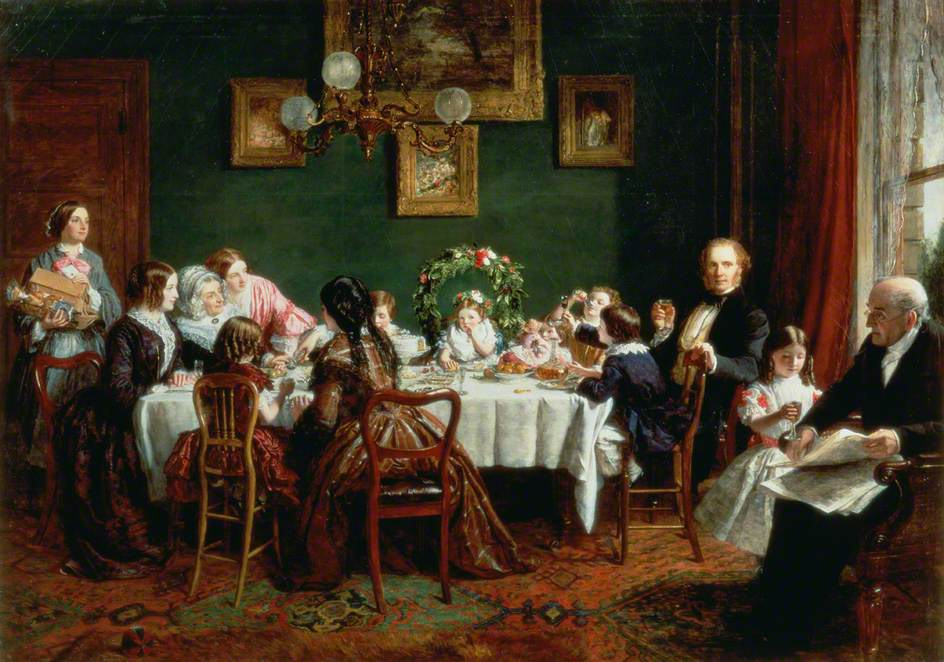
- Artist: William Powell Frith
- Year: 1856
- Type: Oil on canvas, genre painting
- Dimensions: 81.3 cm × 114.4 cm (32.0 in × 45.0 in)
- Location: Mercer Art Gallery, Harrogate

Many Happy Returns of the Day is an 1856 oil painting by the British artist William Powell Frith. It depicts a scene of a Victorian middle-class family celebrating a child's birthday. The title refers to the popular greeting "many happy returns". The painting shows Firth's own family with his wife Isabelle at the opposite end of the table to him. This scene of domestic respectability ironically took place after the artist had already had a child with his long-term mistress Mary Alford.

The painting was displayed at the Royal Academy Exhibition of 1856 held at the National Gallery in London. The picture is now in the collection of the Mercer Art Gallery in Harrogate in the artist's native Yorkshire, having been acquired in 1951.

== Bibliography ==
- Graham-Dixon, Andrew. A History of British Art. University of California Press, 1999.
- Green, Richard & Sellars, Jane. William Powell Frith: The People's Painter. Bloomsbury, 2019.
- Simon, Caroline & Bourne, Susan. The Age of Innocence? Children in Art 1830-1930. Museum Services of Blackburn, Burnley and Lancashire County, 1989.
- Tosh, John. A Man's Place: Masculinity and the Middle-class Home in Victorian England. Yale University Press, 1999.
- Wood, Christopher. William Powell Frith: A Painter and His World. Sutton Publishing, 2006.
