= Jean-François Ducis =

French dramatist (1733–1816)

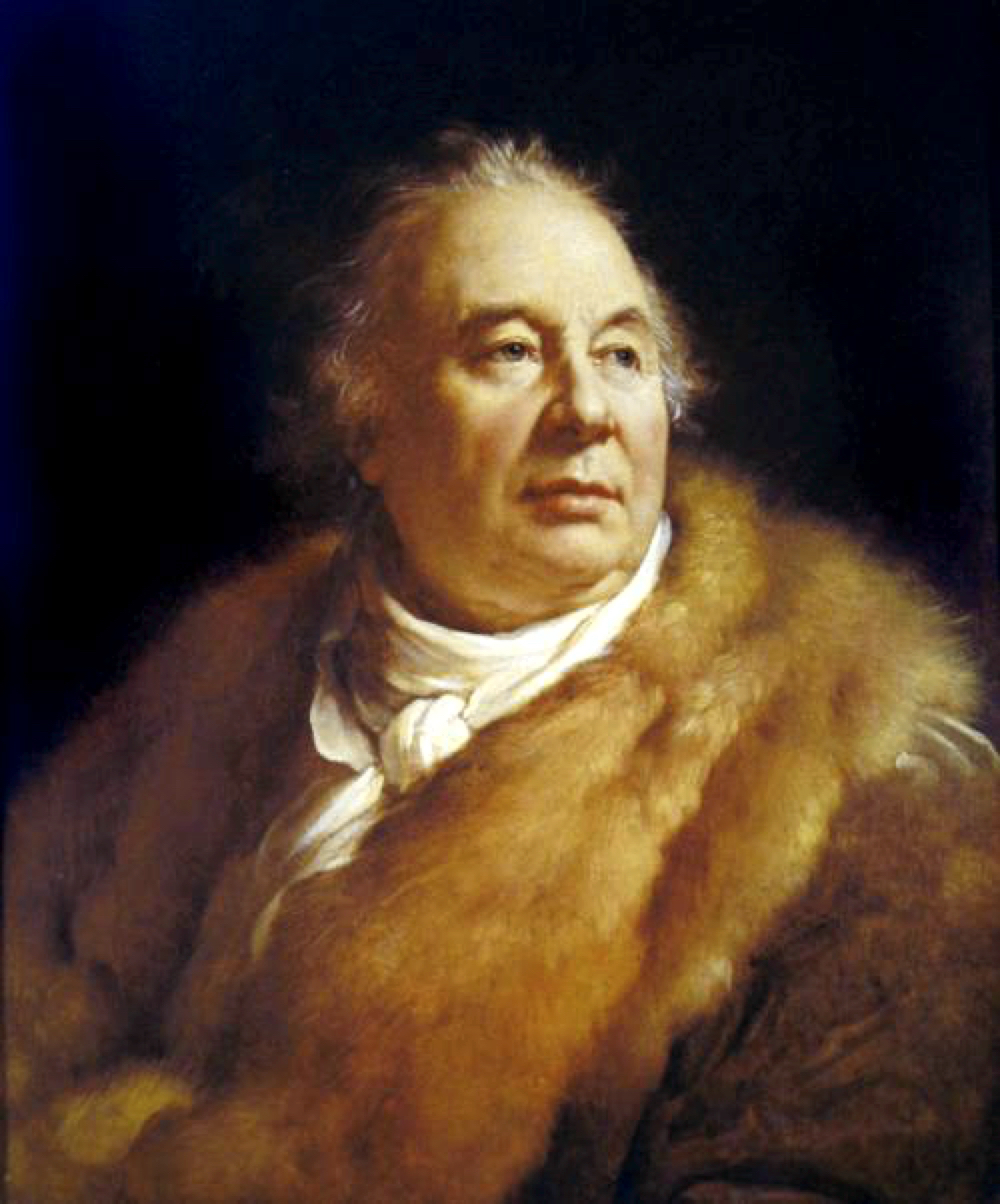
- Portrait of Jean-François Ducis by François Gérard
- Born: 14 August 1733; Versailles, France
- Died: 31 March 1816 (aged 82); Versailles, France
- Occupation: Dramatist

Jean-François Ducis (French: [dysi]; 22 August 1733 – 31 March 1816) was a French dramatist and adapter of Shakespeare.

== Biography ==
Ducis was born in Versailles, one of ten children. His father, Pierre Ducis, originally from Savoy, was a linen draper at Versailles, and his mother, Maria-Thérèse Rappe, was the daughter of a porter of the Count of Toulouse and all through life he retained the simple tastes and straightforward independence fostered by his bourgeois education.

In 1768, he produced his first tragedy, Amélise. The failure of this first attempt was fully compensated by the success of his Hamlet (1769), and Roméo et Juliette (1772). Œdipe chez Admète, imitated partly from Euripides and partly from Sophocles, appeared in 1778, and secured him in the following year the chair in the Academy left vacant by the death of Voltaire. Equally successful was Le Roi Lear in 1783. Macbeth in 1784 did not take so well, and Jean sans terre in 1791 was almost a failure; but Othello in 1792, supported by the acting of Talma, obtained immense applause. Its vivid picture of desert life secured for Abufar ou la Famille arabe (1795), an original drama, a flattering reception.

Ducis was noted for his translations of six of Shakespeare's plays and Ducis' adaptations, which frequently involved renaming characters and revising plots, became the basis for translations into Italian and the languages of Eastern Europe. As an example, Ducis's version of Othello ended with the title character reconciling with Desdemona and pardoning a chastened Iago.

On the failure of a similar piece, Phédor et Waldamir, ou la famille de Sibérie (1801), Ducis ceased to write for the stage; and the rest of his life was spent in quiet retirement at Versailles. He had been named a member of the Council of the Ancients in 1798, but he never discharged the functions of the office; and when Napoleon offered him a post of honor under the empire, he refused. Amiable, religious, and bucolic, he had little sympathy with the fierce, skeptical and tragic times in which his lot was cast. "Alas!" he said in the midst of the Revolution, "tragedy is abroad in the streets; if I step outside of my door, I have blood to my very ankles. I have too often seen Atreus in clogs, to venture to bring an Atreus on the stage."

Medal portraying Jean-François Ducis.

Though actuated by honest admiration of the great English dramatist, Ducis is not Shakespearean. His ignorance of the English language left him at the mercy of the translations of Pierre Letourneur (1736–1788) and of Pierre de la Place (1707–1793); and even this modified Shakespeare had still to undergo a process of purification and correction before he could be presented to the fastidious criticism of French taste. That such was the case was not, however, the fault of Ducis; and he did good service in modifying the judgment of his fellow countrymen. He did not pretend to reproduce, but to excerpt and refashion; and consequently the French play sometimes differs from its English namesake in everything almost but the name. The plot is different, the characters are different, the motif different, and the scenic arrangement different. Le Banquet de l'amitié, a poem in four cantos (1771), Au roi de Sardaigne (1775), Discours de réception à l'académie française (1779), Épîtres à l'amitíé (1786), and a Recueil de poésies (1809), complete the list of Ducis's publications.

== Works ==
=== Theatre plays ===
- 1760: Hamlet
- 1772: Roméo et Juliette
- 1778: Œdipe chez Admèle
- 1783: Le roi Lear
- 1784: Macbeth
- 1791: Jean sans Terre
- 1792: Othello
- 1795: Abufard ou la Famille arabe
- 1797: Œdipe à Colonne
- 1801: Phédor et Waldamir

=== Poetry ===
- 1771: Le Banquet de l’amitié
- 1809: Mélanges
- 1813: Épîtres et poésies diverses
- 1826: Œuvres posthumes (publiées par Vincent Campenon)

=== Correspondence ===
- 1836: Lettres à Talma, 1792-1815, publication posthume

=== Speeches ===
- 1775: Au roi de Sardaigne, sur le mariage du prince de Piémont avec Mme Clotilde de France, 1775
- 1779: Discours de réception : Éloge de M. de Voltaire, 4 March
- 1822: Épître à Richard pendant ma convalescence, 28 November
