= Signature quilt =

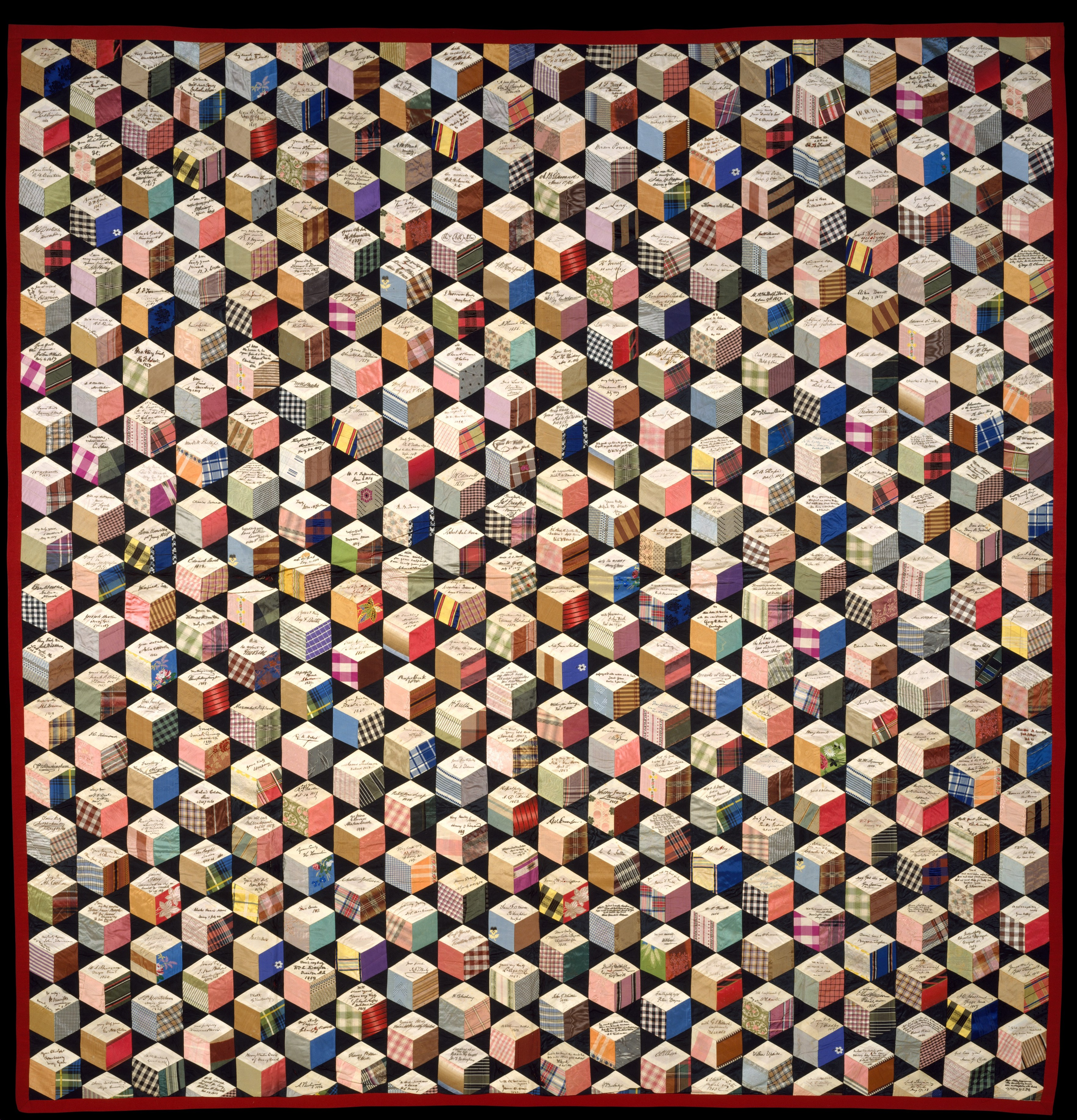
Quilt, Tumbling Blocks with Signatures pattern, containing 350 signatures by Adeline Harris Sears

A signature quilt is a quilt that has multiple names signed, stamped, or embroidered on it. While examples exist prior to 1800, the tradition was popularized in the 19th century often as a means of fundraising or given as keepsakes to people moving west. For example, in 1905 one quilt raised £14 13s, at a time when quilts sold for no more than £1. They were also used to commemorate and document historical and communal events, or to indicate affiliations with organizations or groups. They would rarely include signatures of famous people with one unusual specimen created by Adeline Harris Sears containing 350 signatures including those of eight U.S. Presidents.

Signature quilts are considered useful as primary source documents for genealogists and other researchers.

In New Zealand, Australia, Canada, Britain and the United States they were used to raise funds to send goods to soldiers overseas during World War I. People paid to have their names added to quilts by skilled embroiderers, in New Zealand, usually in red on a white background, but elsewhere signatures were multi-coloured. The quilts were also auctioned or raffled. In World War II a quilt was sent to a military hospital.
