= Portrait of David Garrick =

1770 painting by Thomas Gainsborough

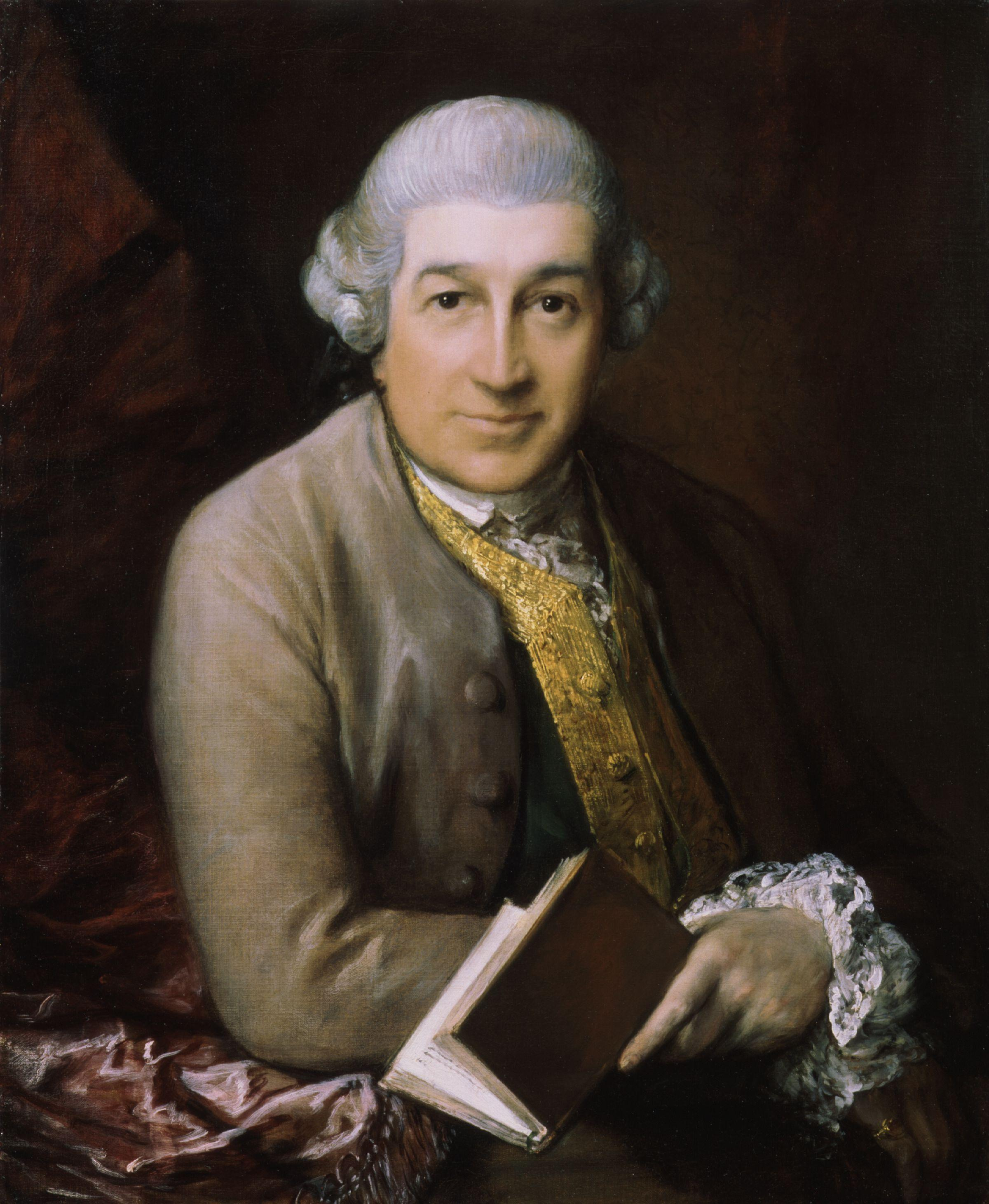
- Artist: Thomas Gainsborough
- Year: 1770
- Type: Oil on canvas, portrait
- Dimensions: 75.6 mm cm × 63.2 cm ( × 24.9 in)
- Location: National Portrait Gallery; London

Portrait of David Garrick is an oil on canvas painting by the British artist Thomas Gainsborough, from 1770. It is held at the National Portrait Gallery, in London.

== History and description ==
A half-length portrait of the celebrated English actor-manager David Garrick, it shows him with a book at his hand, while looking directly at the viewer. He seems to be on a pause while reading. It was exhibited at the Royal Academy Exhibition of 1770. Diarist Horace Walpole described the portrait as "very like". Garrick, owner and star performer at the Theatre Royal, Drury Lane, was at the height of his fame when Gainsborough painted him, while at Bath.

== Bibliography ==
- Hamilton, James. Gainsborough: A Portrait. Hachette UK, 2017.
- Kendall, Alan. David Garrick: A Biography. Harrap, 1985.
- Whitley, William Thomas. Thomas Gainsborough. Smith, Elder & Company, 1915.
- Woodall, Joanna. Portraiture: Facing the Subject. Manchester University Press, 15 Mar 1997.
