= Elizabeth Taylor (painter) =

American painter

- Born: January 8, 1856; Columbus, Ohio
- Died: March 8, 1932 (aged 76); Rochester, Vermont
- Known for: Painting, journalism, botany

Elizabeth Taylor (January 8, 1856 – March 8, 1932) was an American artist, journalist, botanist, and traveler. Her travel essays from Alaska, Canada, Iceland, the Faroe Islands and Norway were published in Frank Leslie's Popular Monthly, Atlantic Monthly, Forest and Stream and others. Some of her essays are published in The Far Islands and Other Cold Places (ISBN 1-880654-11-3). Whilst in Norway, Taylor had discovered two new species of flowers and two new species of insects.

During World War I, she was marooned at Eiði in the Faroe Islands, where she was a probable influence on Faroese painting pioneer Niels Kruse. (The census in Eiði, Faroe Islands in 1916 gives her date of birth as February 8, 1861.) In July 1919, Taylor left the Faroe Islands and returned to the United States, choosing Vermont, as her stop. After thirty years of travel with no real home, in 1923, she settled down in a two-room cabin at the age of 64, which she had built on Wake Robin Farm, owned by her friend Blanche Dunham Hubbard.

She died at her cottage Wake Robin in Rochester, Vermont, on March 8, 1932.
