= The Jester Calabacillas (Madrid) =

Painting by Diego Velázquez

- El bufón Calabacillas (Spanish)
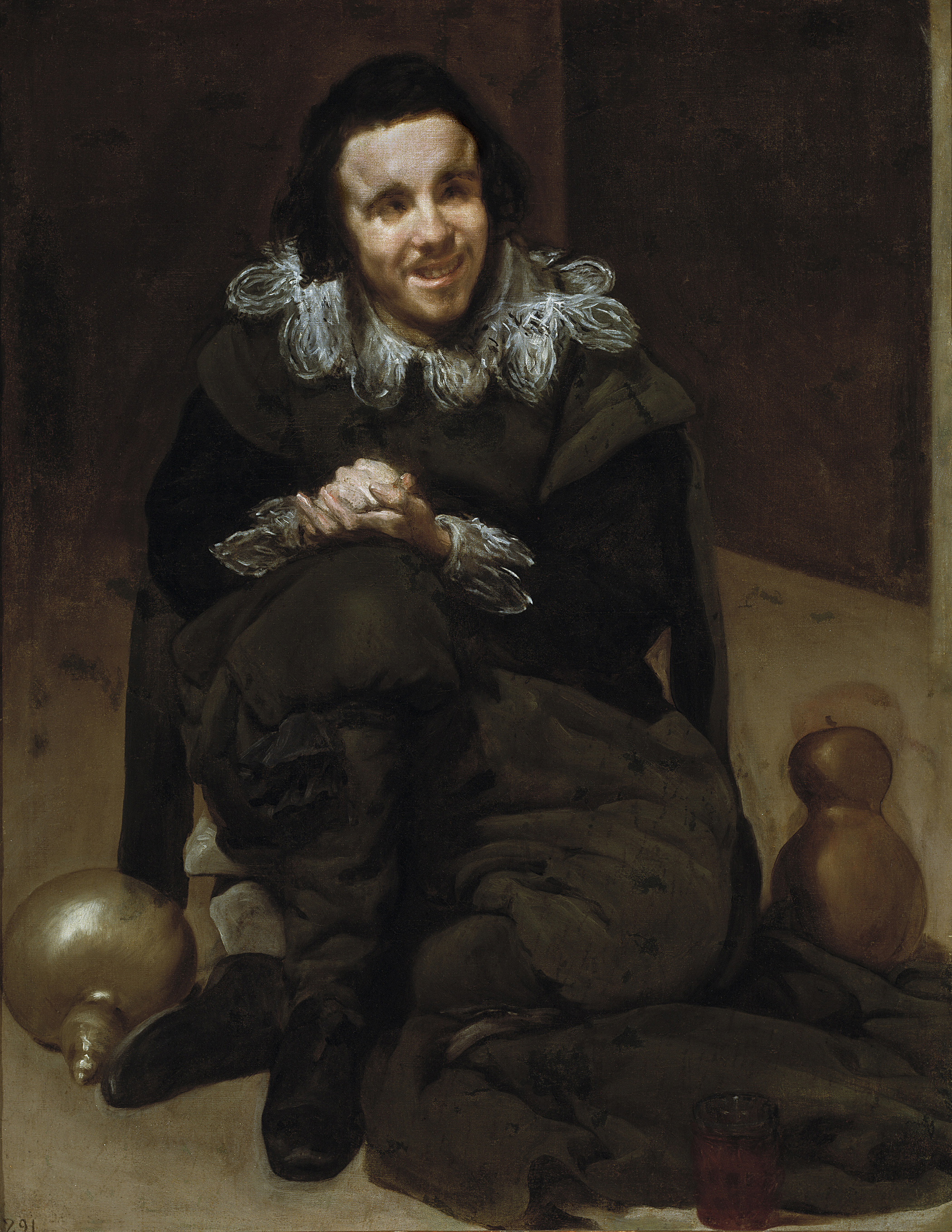
- Artist: Diego Velázquez
- Year: 1637–1639
- Medium: oil on canvas
- Dimensions: 106.5 cm × 82.5 cm (41.9 in × 32.5 in)
- Location: Museo del Prado; Madrid

The Jester Calabacillas is a portrait by Velázquez of Don Juan Martín Martín, "Juan de Calabazas" or "El Búfón Calabacillas", a jester at the court of Philip IV of Spain. He earned a comfortable wage and was sometimes known by the nickname Bizco (cross-eyed). The painting is now held in the Prado Museum.

Velazquez painted Calabacillas with respect, indeed this portrait was one of several the painter undertook in depicting the court's jesters. This unique aspect of his illustrious portfolio further highlights Velazquez' equal show of dignity to all, whether king or jester.

Due to limitations and inaccuracies in cataloguing, the nature of Calabacillas' condition remains contested. Studies of Spanish palace records indicate specific classifications for jesters, based on the individuals' perceived conditions. While Calabacillas is seen painted in full-size, he is recorded as an "enano" (translated as "dwarf" or "small one"). It has been suggested this classification may instead refer to an intellectual "smallness" of the mind, or alternatively, symptoms of a condition such as infantile hypothyroidism.

As well as the painting now in the Museo del Prado, the jester is the subject of a painting in the U.S., The Jester Calabacillas (Cleveland).

== See also ==
- List of works by Diego Velázquez
