= Jean-Baptiste-Joseph Duchesne =

French painter and miniaturist (1770–1856)

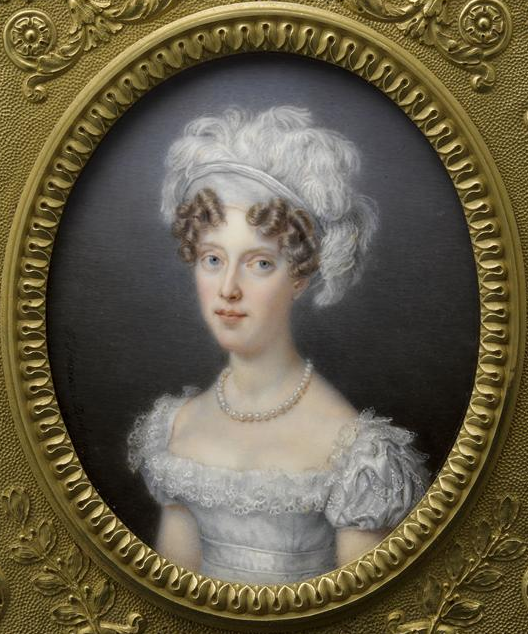
Marie-Caroline de Bourbon-Sicile, duchess de Berry, miniature portrait

Jean-Baptiste-Joseph Duchesne (1770, Gisors, Eure - 1856, Paris) was a French painter and miniaturist.

He became known after the exposition of 1804 and was a royal painter during Restoration. His works are quite realistic.

== Biography ==
Jean-Baptiste-Joseph Duchesne, known as Duchesne de Gisors, a French painter of miniatures and enamels, was born at Gisors in 1770. He was the son of Jean Baptiste Duchesne, a sculptor, and a pupil of Vincent. He exhibited at first under the name of Duchesne, afterwards under that of Duchesne des Argillers, and finally, from 1833 until his death, under that of Duchesne de Gisors. He died at Gisors in 1856.
