= Gian Domenico Valentini =

Italian painter (1639–1715)

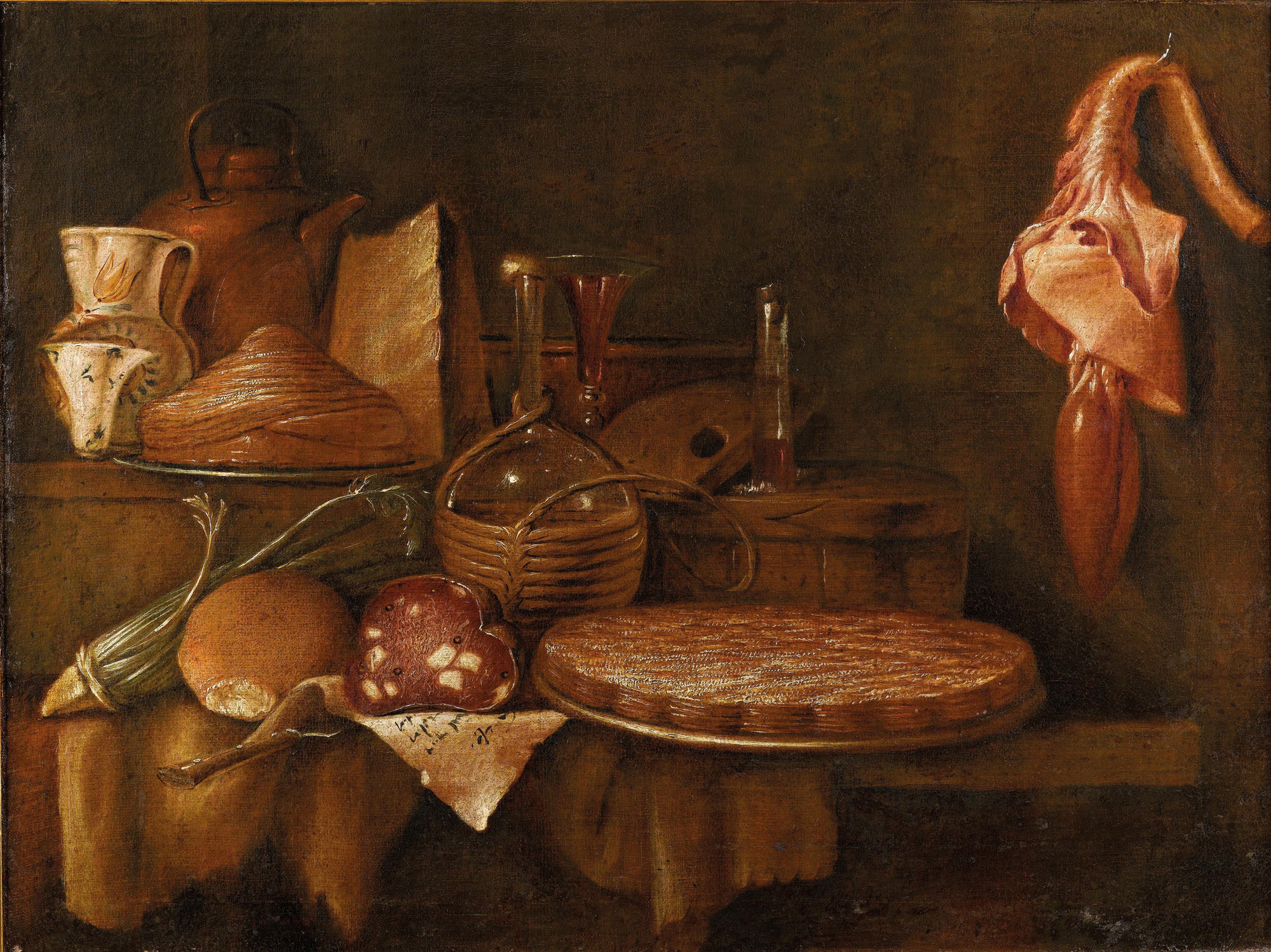
Natura morta di cibo su un tavolo

Gian Domenico Valentini (1639–1715) was an Italian painter of the Baroque period. He painted still lifes.

== Partial Anthology ==
- Interno di cucina
