= Pierre-Philippe Mignot =

French sculptor

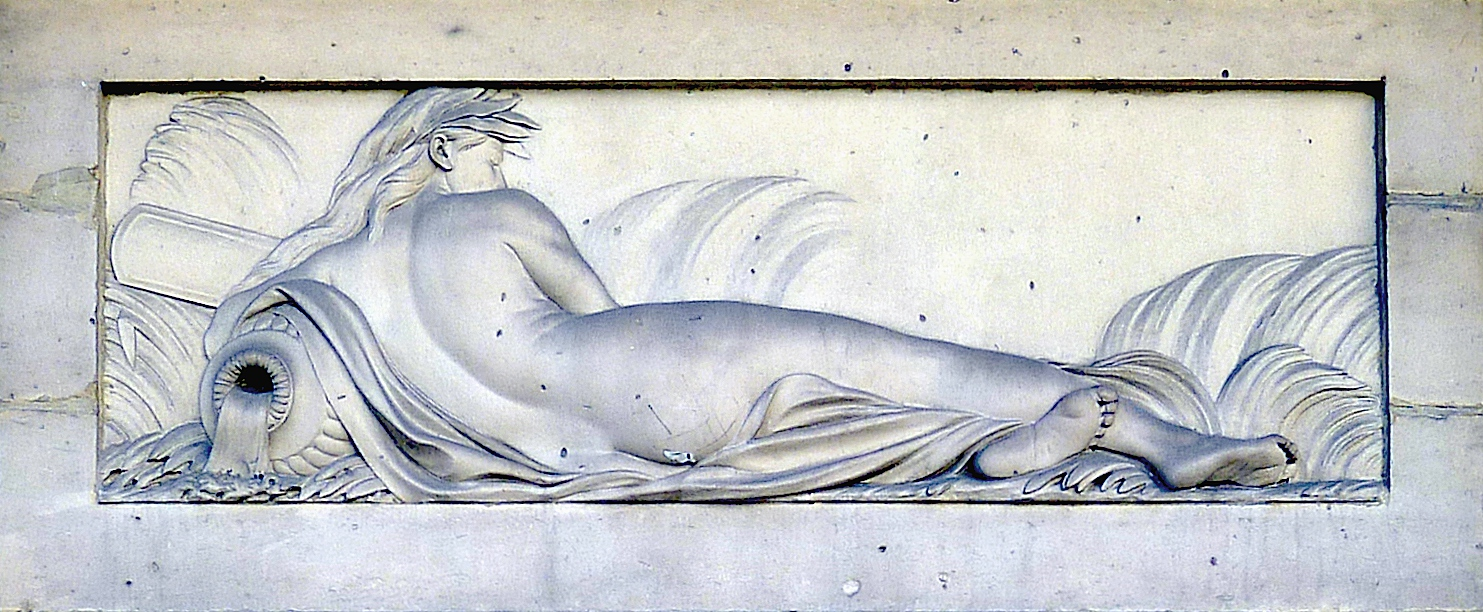
bas-relief of a naiad by Pierre-Philippe Mignot, Fontaine des Haudriettes (Paris), 1764

Pierre-Philippe Mignot (1715 - 24 December 1770) was a French sculptor.

At the Académie royale de peinture et de sculpture (Royal Academy of Painting and Sculpture), he was a pupil of Antoine François Vassé (father of Louis-Claude Vassé), and Jean-Baptiste Lemoyne. He won the Prix de Rome second prize for sculpture in 1738 for David présenté à Sâtil and in 1739 for Jezebel mangée par ses chiens both in bas-relief, and the first grand prix in 1740 with Abigaïl aux pieds de David. He was a resident at the Villa Medici between June 1742 and November 1743. Mignot returned to France in July 1746, and submitted 1747 Sleeping Venus to the Académie, but never became an academician. He exhibited at the Salon in Paris from 1757 to 1765.
