= 1781 in art =

Events from the year 1781 in art.

== Events ==
- April 30 – The Royal Academy Exhibition of 1781 opens at Somerset House in London
- August 25 – The Salon of 1781 opens at the Louvre in Paris
- August 27 – Danish artists Marie Jeanne Crevoisier and Johan Frederik Clemens are married.

== Works ==
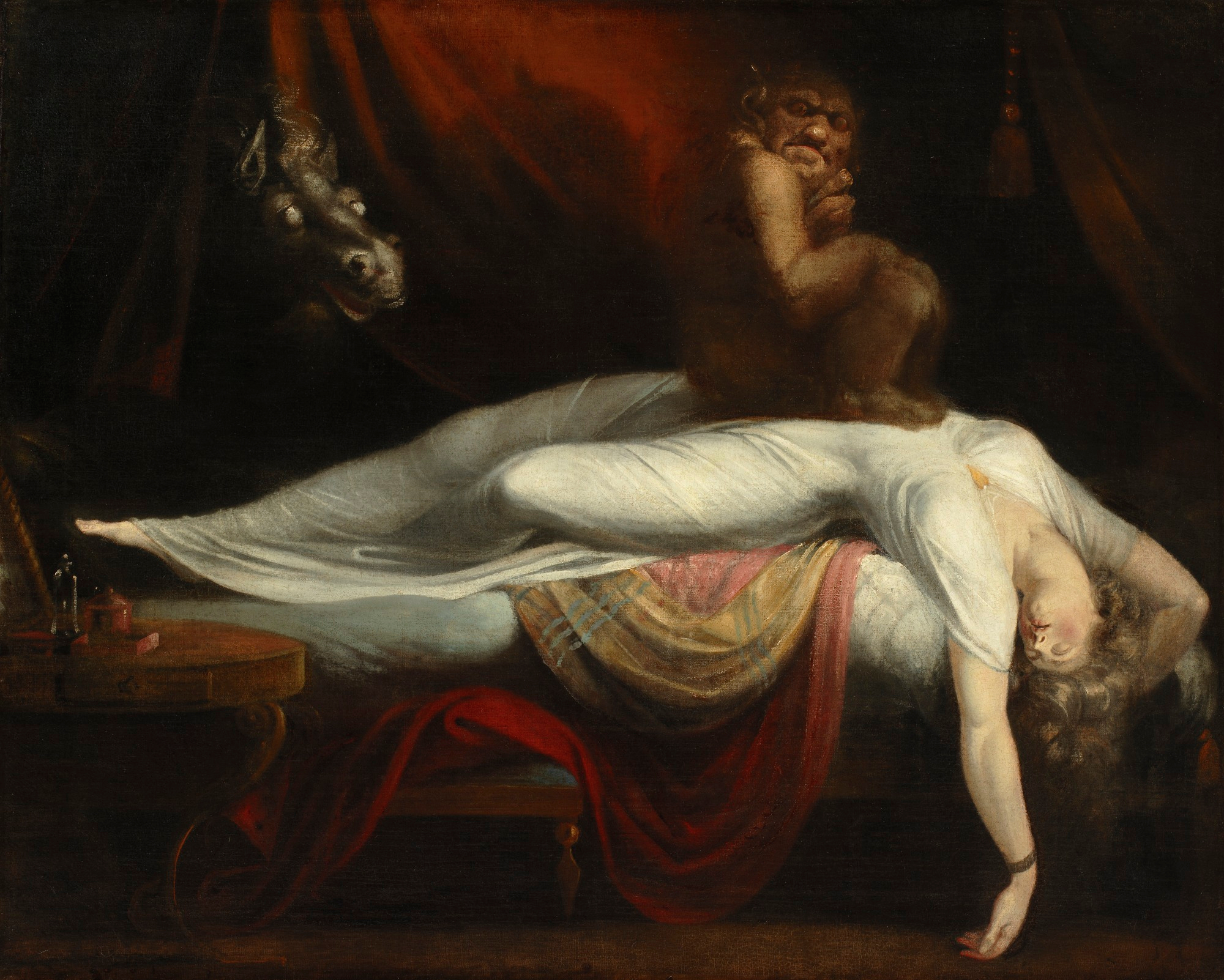
Henry Fuseli, The Nightmare, 1781, Detroit Institute of Arts

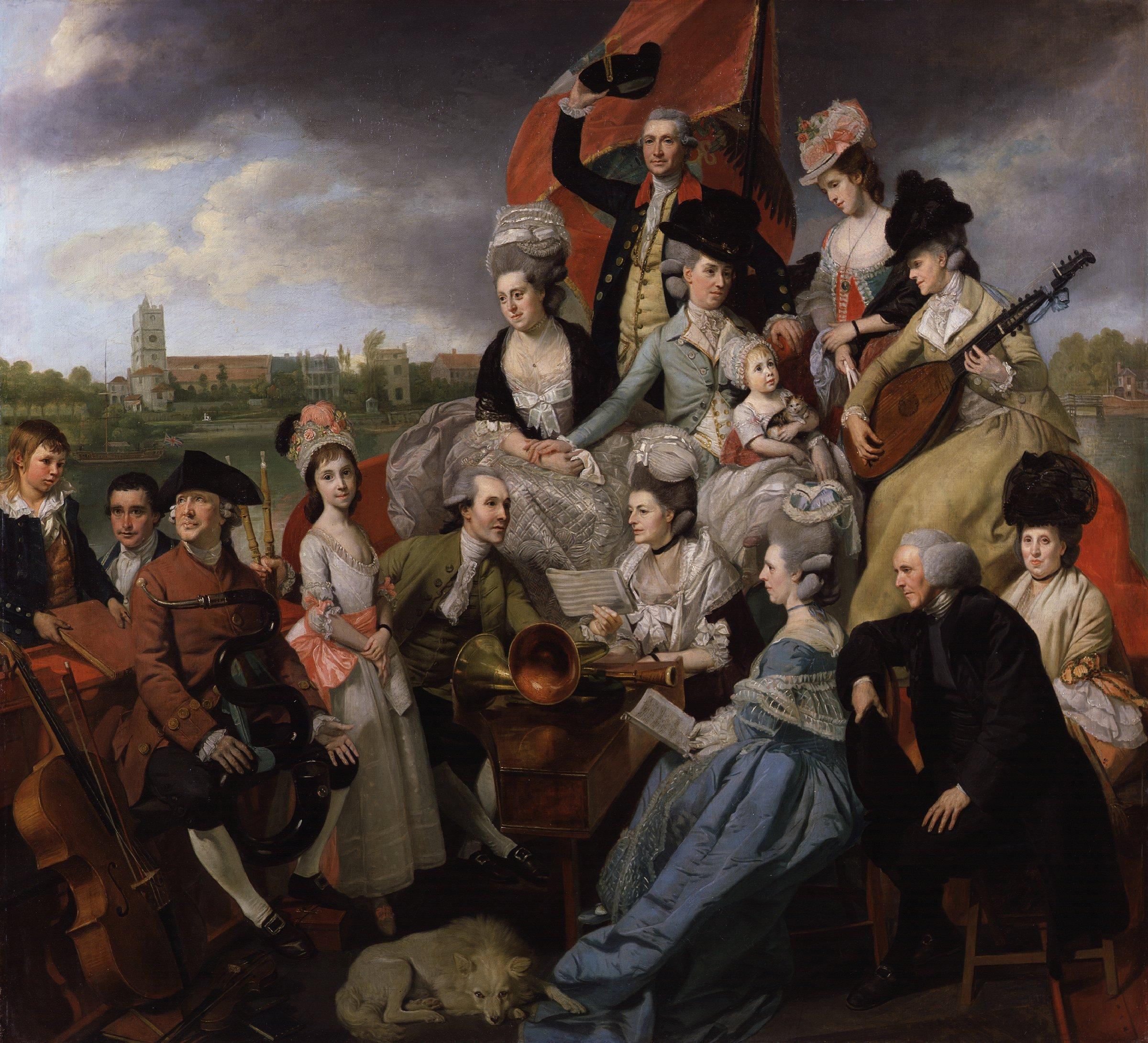
The Sharp Family by Johann Zoffany.

- George Barret, Sr. – View of Windermere Lake, Early Morning
- Jacques-Louis David
  - Belisarius begging for alms
  - Portrait of Count Stanislas Potocki
- Philip James de Loutherbourg – Eidophusikon
- Henry Fuseli – The Nightmare
- Thomas Gainsborough
  - Portrait of Mary Robinson
  - Portrait of Queen Charlotte
- Anton Graff – Frederick the Great, King of Prussia
- Jean-Antoine Houdon – Portrait busts of Voltaire and Molière
- Élisabeth Vigée Le Brun – Juno Borrowing the Belt of Venus
- Joshua Reynolds
  - The Death of Dido
  - Thaïs
  - George, 2nd Earl Harcourt, his wife Elizabeth and his brother William (Ashmolean Museum, Oxford)
- John Francis Rigaud – Portrait of Horatio Nelson
- George Romney
  - Ann Bowes
  - The Charteris Children
- Dominic Serres – The Moonlight Battle
- Gilbert Stuart – Portrait of Benjamin West
- François-André Vincent – The Intervention of the Sabine Women
- Joseph Wright of Derby – Portrait of Sir Brooke Boothby
- Johann Zoffany
  - The Sayer Family of Richmond
  - The Sharp Family

== Births ==
- February 26 – Étienne-Jean Delécluze, French painter and critic (died 1863)
- March (probable) – John Burnet, Scottish engraver and painter (died 1868)
- March 13 – Karl Friedrich Schinkel, Prussian architect and painter (died 1841)
- March 20 – Joseph Paelinck, Belgian painter (died 1839)
- April 7 – Francis Leggatt Chantrey, English sculptor of the Georgian era (died 1841)
- April 8 – Luke Clennell, English engraver and painter (died 1840)
- April 22 – José de Madrazo y Agudo, Spanish Neoclassic painter (died 1859)
- July 25 – Merry-Joseph Blondel, French neo-classic painter (died 1853)
- October 12 – William Westall, English landscape painter (died 1850)
- November 1 – Joseph Stieler, German painter (died 1858)
- November 11 – Caroline Bardua, German painter (died 1864)
- November 21 – Cornelius Varley, English watercolor painter (died 1873)
- date unknown
  - Thomas Douglas Guest, British portrait painter (died 1845)
  - Francis Hervé, French-born British painter (died 1850)
- probable – John Wesley Jarvis, American painter (died 1839)

== Deaths ==
- January 15 – Sir Henry Cheere, 1st Baronet, English sculptor (born 1703)
- February 22 – Giovanni Maria Morlaiter, Italian Rococo sculptor (born 1699)
- April 10 – Teodor Kračun, Serbian painter (born 1730)
- June 5 – Noël Hallé, French painter, draftsman and printmaker (born 1711)
- September 12 – Peter Scheemakers, Flemish Roman Catholic sculptor (born 1691)
- September 30 – Jean-Baptiste Le Prince, French etcher and painter (born 1734)
- October 22 – Johann August Nahl, German sculptor and stucco artist (born 1710)
- November 3 – Jakob Emanuel Handmann, Swiss painter (born 1718)
- November 12 – Jean Grandjean, Dutch painter, draftsman, and watercolourist (born 1752)
- date unknown
  - Etienne Aubry, French painter of primarily portraits and genre subjects (born 1746)
  - Jean-Bernard, abbé Le Blanc, French art critic and director of the official French policy in the arts (born 1707)
  - Francesco Caccianiga, Italian painter and engraver (born 1700)
  - Carlo Costanzi, Italian gem engraver of the late-Baroque period (born 1705)
  - Jacques-Ignace de La Touche, French painter of miniatures and portraits (born 1694)
  - Ubaldo Gandolfi, Italian painter (born 1728)
