= Portrait of Benjamin West =

Portrait of Benjamin West may refer to:

- Portrait of Benjamin West (Lawrence)
- Portrait of Benjamin West (Stuart, National Portrait Gallery)
- Portrait of Benjamin West (Stuart, Tate Britain)
