= Emily Warren (courtesan) =

Celebrated courtesan in 18th century London

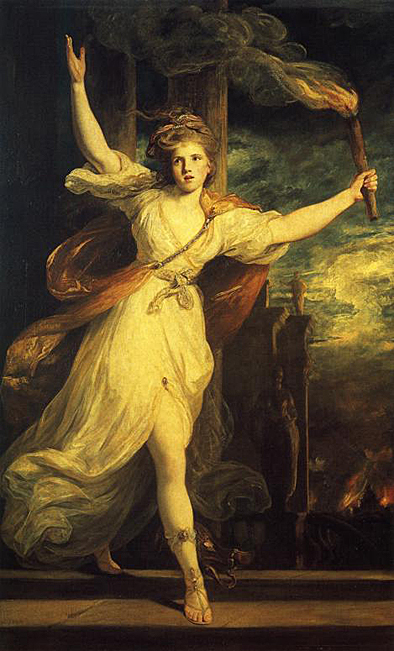
- Joshua Reynolds, Thaïs, 1781. Oil on canvas. Waddesdon Manor, Buckinghamshire.
- Other names: Emily Pott; Emily Bertie; Emily Coventry
- Occupation: Courtesan

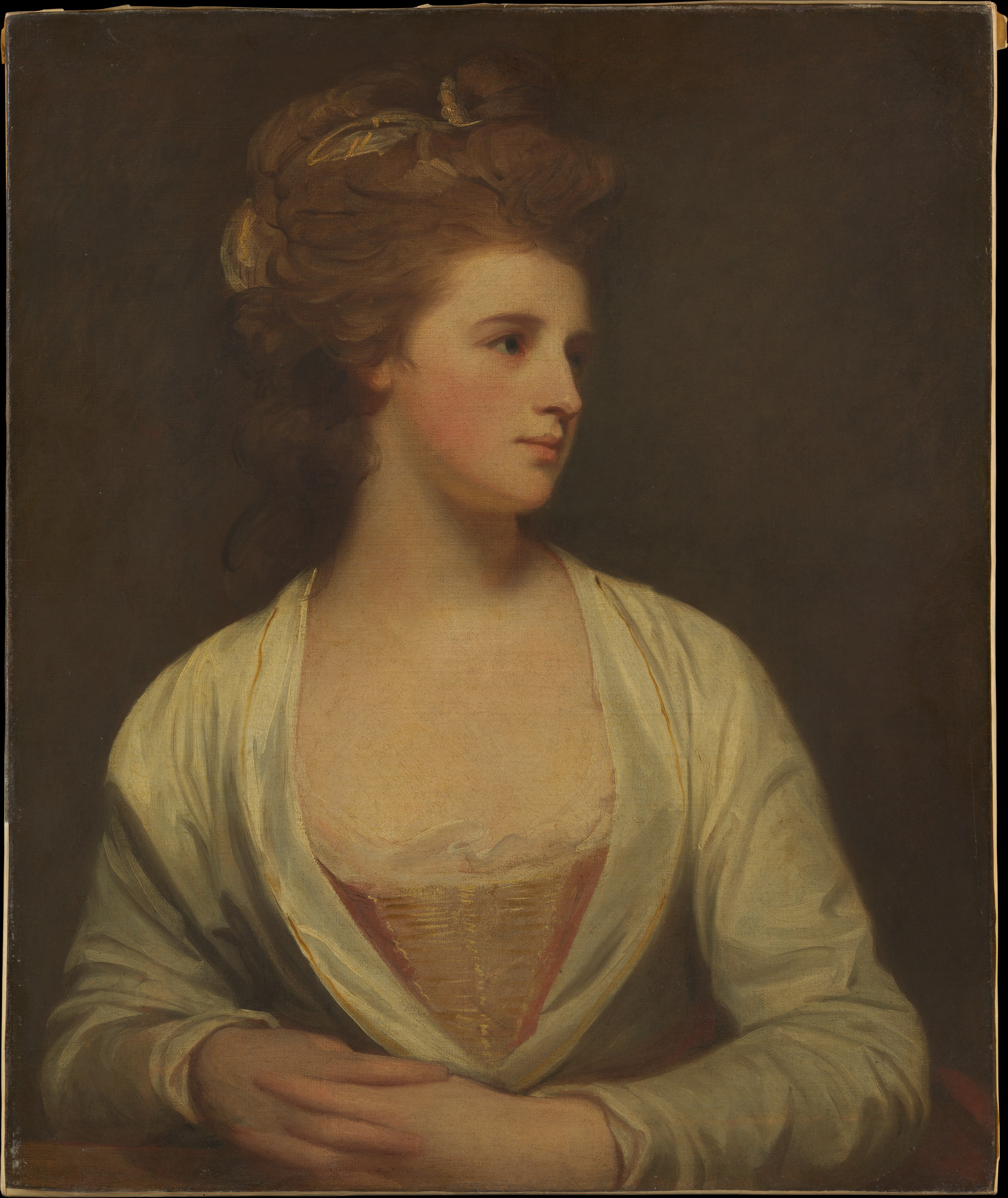
George Romney, Young woman believed to be Emily Pott. Oil on canvas, 1781.

Emily Warren, also known as Emily Bertie, Emily Coventry and Emily Pott, (died 1781 or 1782) was a celebrated courtesan in 18th century London who was painted by Sir Joshua Reynolds, George Romney, Nathaniel Dance, and the Scottish miniaturist Charles Shirreff, although the images of Warren by Dance and Shirreff are lost or unidentified. Warren figured prominently in the memoirs of William Hickey.

== Biography ==
As a child, Warren wandered the streets with her blind beggar father. At the age of 12 Warren was "discovered" by Charlotte Hayes and trained to work as a prostitute in Hayes' "nunnery". Hayes taught her deportment and manners and she received "universal admiration". Hickey saw Warren around this time before departing for India in 1776. Reynolds probably first met Warren at Hayes' establishment in the late 1770s. He, and other artists, were known to visit London's brothels in search of models.

Warren left Hayes' establishment to become the mistress of Charles Greville, who commissioned Reynolds to paint her as Thaïs. In 1778 she left Greville to be "kept" by Hickey's friend, Captain Robert (Bob) Pott of the East India Company. He set her up in a house in Cork Street, with liveried servants, a yellow carriage and a box at the opera house.

In July 1780 Pott left for India and in the same month Hickey returned from the colony. Hickey and Warren resumed their relationship. To support his view that Warren was 'perfection', Hickey sought the opinion of Reynolds, "whom all the world allowed to be a competent judge" of beauty. Reynolds "declared every limb of hers perfect symmetry, and altogether he had never seen so faultless and finely formed a human figure."

=== Death ===
Pott returned from India and the couple married. They sailed off to India to start a new life, much to the disapproval of Pott's father. Between Madras and Calcutta Warren died of a fever. Pott was so distraught that he had her coffin placed in a small boat that was towed behind the ship. On arrival in Calcutta her body was interred in the holy burial ground by the Hooghly River. Pott commissioned an architect, Edoardo Tiretta, to construct a mausoleum for her over the grave at a cost of £3,000 and a column for an additional £1,000.

== Bibliography ==
- Baetjer, Katharine (2009). British Paintings in the Metropolitan Museum of Art, 1575-1875. Metropolitan Museum of Art. ISBN 9781588393487.
- Clee, Nicholas (2011). Eclipse. Black Swan. ISBN 9780552774420.
- Cruickshank, Dan (2010). The Secret History of Georgian London: How the Wages of Sin Shaped the Capital. Random House. ISBN 9781407089515.
- Farington, Joseph (1924). The Farington Diary. HardPress Publishing. ISBN 9781313924924.
- Hickey, William (1782). Memoirs of William Hickey ... Hurst & Blackett, Limited. ISBN 9780710081292.
- Teal, Adrian, ed. (1782). The Gin Lane Gazette: A Profusely Illustrated Compendium of Devilish Scandal and Oddities from the Darkest Recesses of Georgian England. Unbound Publishing. ISBN 9781908717764.
- Williams, Kate (2007). England's Mistress: The Infamous Life of Emma Hamilton. Penguin Random House. ISBN 9780099451839.
