= Portrait of George III (Gainsborough) =

Painting by Thomas Gainsborough

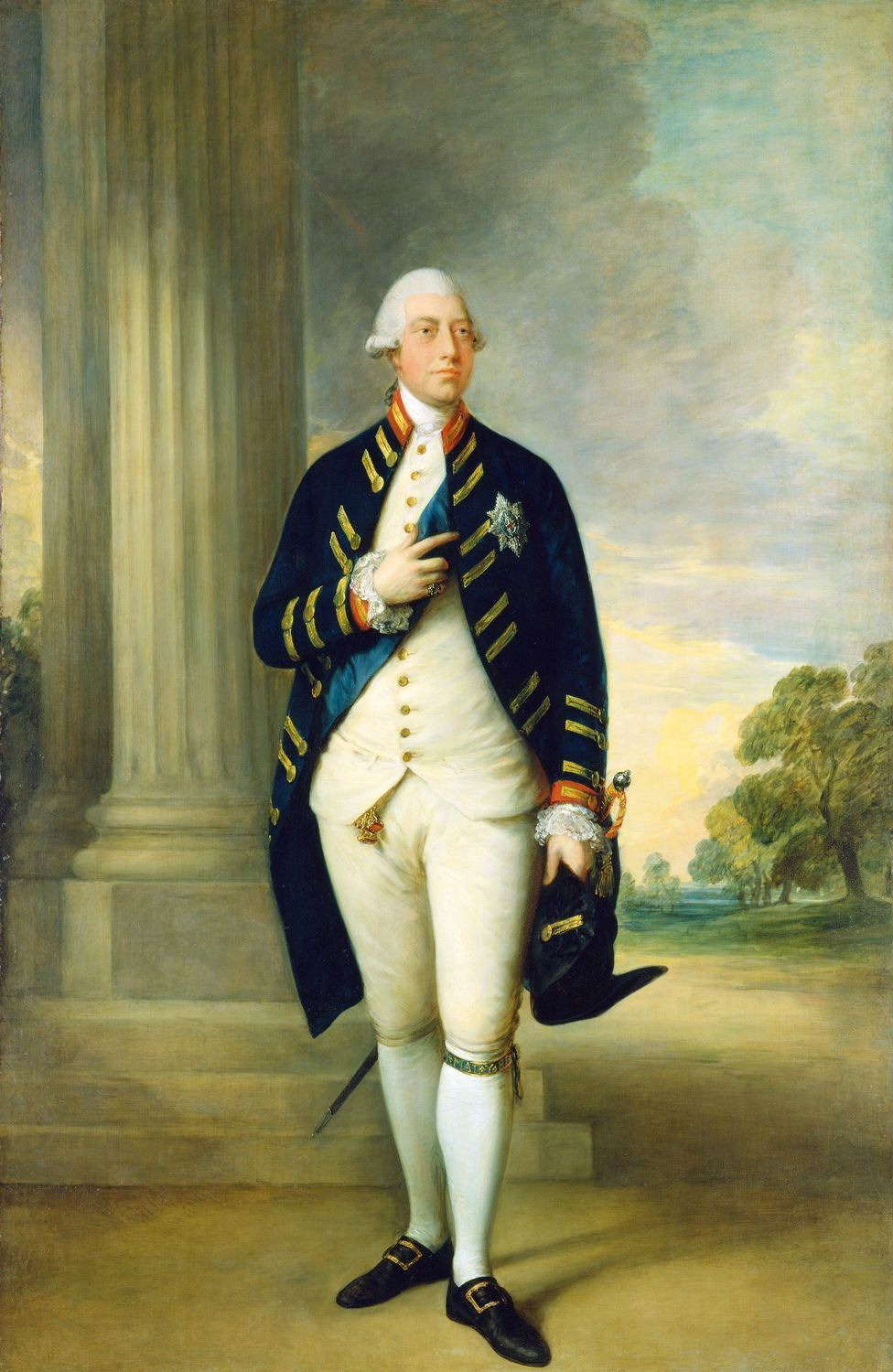
- Artist: Thomas Gainsborough
- Year: 1781
- Type: Oil on canvas, portrait painting
- Dimensions: 238.8 cm × 158.7 cm (94.0 in × 62.5 in)
- Location: Royal Collection; London

Portrait of George III is an oil on canvas portrait painting by the English artist Thomas Gainsborough, from 1781. It is held in the Royal Collection.

It depicts George III, king of Great Britain. He is portrayed wearing the Windsor uniform and pointing to the Garter star on his chest. The king was painted by a number of artists following his accession to the throne.

The work was commissioned by George. Gainsborough also produced a companion piece featuring his wife, Queen Charlotte. The work was shown at the Royal Academy's Summer Exhibition of 1781 at Somerset House. The king hung it in the dining room at Buckingham Palace and it has remained in the Royal Collection since.

The commission promoted Gainsborough into royal favour at the expense of his rival Sir Joshua Reynolds.

== Bibliography ==
- Asfour, Amal & Williamson, Paul. Gainsborough's Vision. Liverpool University Press, 1999.
- Roberts, Jane. George III and Queen Charlotte: Patronage, Collecting and Court Taste. Royal Collection, 2009.
