= Dido (Fuseli) =

Painting by Henry Fuseli

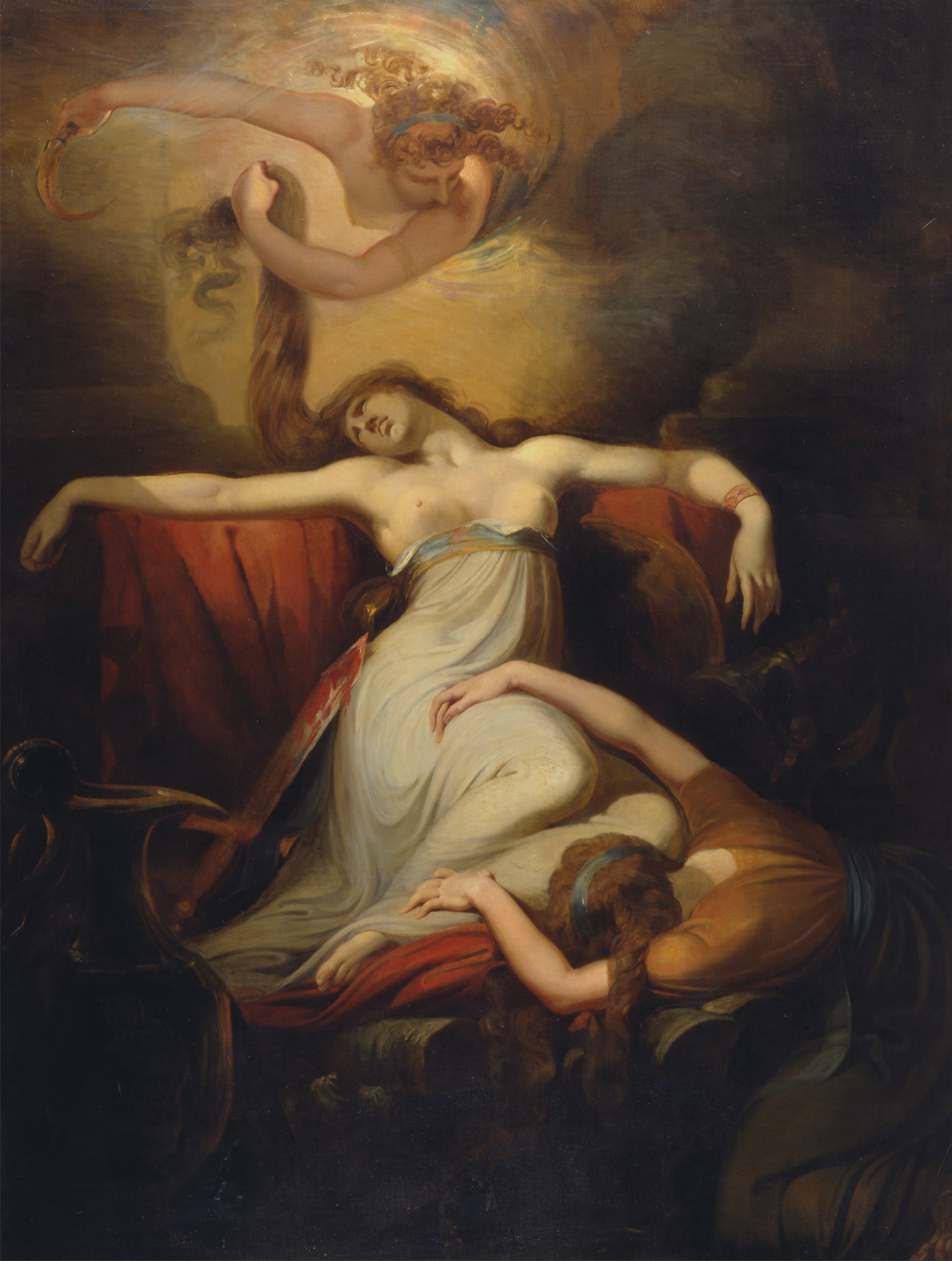
- Artist: Henry Fuseli
- Year: 1781
- Medium: Oil on canvas
- Dimensions: 244.3 cm × 183.4 cm (96.2 in × 72.2 in)
- Location: Yale Center for British Art; New Haven

Dido is an oil on canvas painting by the Swiss-British artist Henry Fuseli, created in 1781. This mythological work represents Iris preparing to cut the hair of the corpse of Dido, the queen of Carthage, who lies bare-chested, with a bloody sword at her side, after committing suicide. The work is held at the Yale Center for British Art, in New Haven.

== History and description ==
The canvas is inspired by an episode of the Aeneid, by Virgil, more precisely by the tragic end of Dido. The founder of Carthage had fallen in love with Aeneas, and his departure in search of a new homeland for the Trojans broke her heart, and she committed suicide by stabbing herself. Dido is seen seated, with her arms stretched in the shape of a cross. For Fuseli, Dido's suicide is an example of a "supreme beauty in the jaws of death". The goddess Juno, enemy of Aeneas, sent her messenger Iris to cut a lock of the queen's hair, and this is the scene depicted in the painting. At the foot of her corpse, there is a woman crying, most likely Anna, Dido's sister. The lighting is concentrated on the center of the work, leaving the edges more in shadows, except for the upper part, where Iris appears. The outstretched arms of the Punic queen recall those of other female figures in Fuseli's paintings, such as The Nightmare and The Dream of Queen Catherine.

It was displayed at the Royal Academy Exhibition of 1781 at Somerset House in London. Fuseli chose the subject to compete with his longtime rival, Joshua Reynolds, who also made a painting of Dido for the same exhibition The Death of Dido.
