= The Death of Dido (Reynolds) =

Painting by Joshua Reynolds

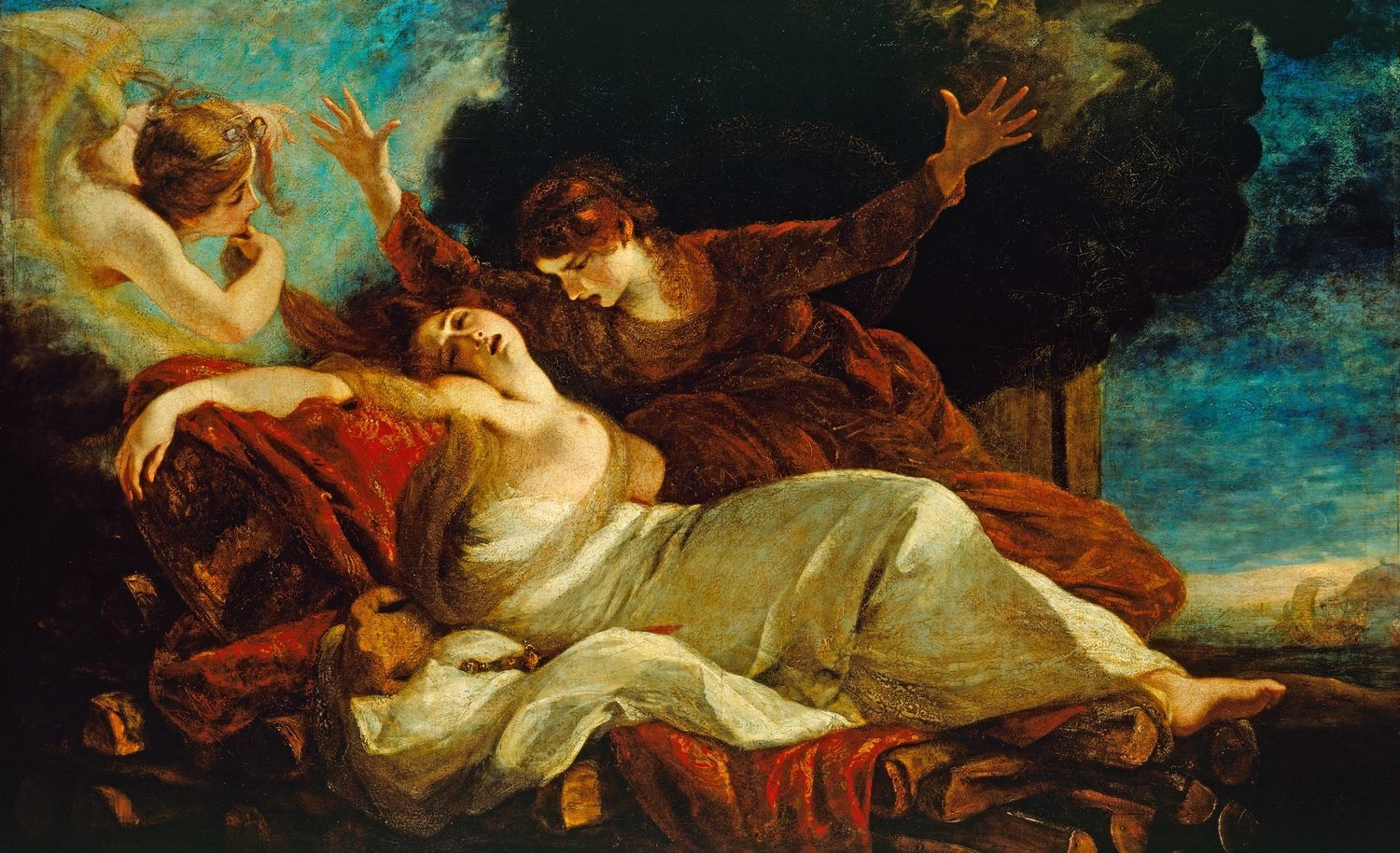
- Artist: Joshua Reynolds
- Year: 1781
- Type: Oil on canvas, history painting
- Dimensions: 147.5 cm × 239.2 cm (58.1 in × 94.2 in)
- Location: Royal Collection

The Death of Dido is a 1781 history painting by the British artist Joshua Reynolds. It depicts a scene from the epic Aeneid by the Roman poet Virgil. After being abandoned by her lover, the Trojan adventurer Aeneas, the Carthaginian queen Dido has committed suicide. In the distance, the fleet of Aeneas can be seen heading out to sea. The theme was a popular one in European art from the Renaissance onwards. The painting was displayed at the Royal Academy Exhibition of 1781 held at Somerset House in London. The Swiss artist Henry Fuseli submitted his own version of the scene Dido at the exhibition, and the two were frequently compared. George IV was a noted art collector who admired the artist's work, and in 1821 he acquired this piece from Reynolds's niece the Marchioness of Thomond. It remains in the Royal Collection today.

== Bibliography ==
- McIntyre, Ian. Joshua Reynolds: The Life and Times of the First President of the Royal Academy. Allen Lane, 2003.
- Myrone, Martin. Henry Fuseli. Tate Publishing, 2001.
- Solkin, David H. (ed.) Art on the Line: The Royal Academy Exhibitions at Somerset House, 1780-1836. Courthald Gallery, 2001.
