= Portrait of Benjamin West (Stuart, National Portrait Gallery) =

Painting by Gilbert Stuart

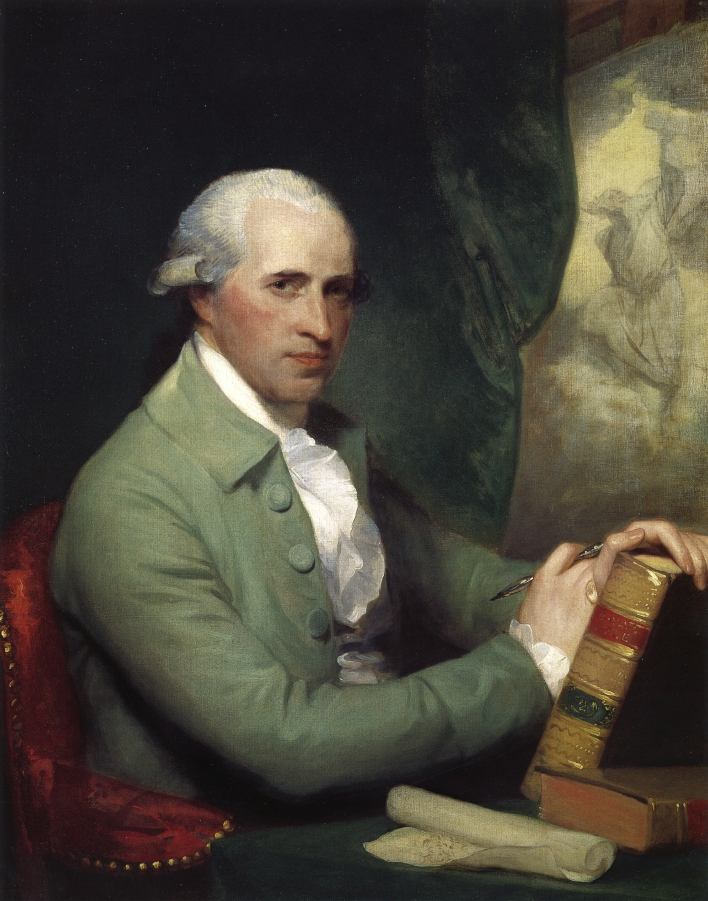
- Artist: Gilbert Stuart
- Year: 1785
- Type: Oil on canvas
- Location: National Portrait Gallery, London

Portrait of Benjamin West is a 1785 portrait painting by the American artist Gilbert Stuart of the noted Anglo-American painter Benjamin West. West, a future President of the Royal Academy settled in Britain during the 1760s. His epic 1770 battle painting The Death of General Wolfe established him as a leading artist.

West is shown seated in front of a dark green curtain. His hand rests on books including Tobias Smollett's book History of England. In the background is West's as yet unfished religious painting Moses Receiving the Law. It was originally commissioned by John Boydell who ran the Boydell Shakespeare Gallery. It is now in the collection of the National Portrait Gallery in London having been acquired in 1872.

== See also ==
- Portrait of Benjamin West by Gilbert Stuart, 1781, at the Tate Britain
- Portrait of Benjamin West, an 1810 portrait of the artist by Thomas Lawrence

== Bibliography ==
- Barratt, Carrie Rebora & Miles, Ellen G. Gilbert Stuart. Metropolitan Museum of Art, 2004.
- Ingamells, John. National Portrait Gallery Mid-Georgian Portraits, 1760–1790. National Portrait Gallery, 2004.
- Staiti, Paul. Of Arms and Artists: The American Revolution through Painters' Eyes. Bloomsbury Publishing USA, 2016.
