= Thomas Douglas Guest =

British painter (1781–1845)

Thomas Douglas Guest (1781–1845), often simply Douglas Guest, was a British historical- and portrait painter, and lecturer and writer on art.

== Life ==
He was the son of Thomas Robert Guest, an artist who lived in Salisbury from the beginning of the 19th Century, and his wife Margaret (née Douglass).

Guest studied at the schools of the Royal Academy, and in 1803 sent his first contribution to its exhibitions: a portrait of the sculptor Joseph Wilton. The next year he was represented by Madonna and Child, and in 1805 was awarded the gold medal for historical painting, the subject being Bearing the Dead Body of Patroclus to the Camp, Achilles's Grief. This work was exhibited at the British Institution in 1807. He continued to contribute paintings to the Academy until 1838 (see list below). He also exhibited several pictures at the British Institution, and a few at the Society of British Artists. In 1809 he painted a large picture of 'The Transfiguration', which he presented as an altarpiece to St Thomas's Church, Salisbury. It was variously described as being 40 feet high and as measuring 21 feet high and 13 feet wide. Towards the end of the 19th century, the Dictionary of National Biography noted that some remains of it survived in the vestry.

In 1829, Guest published An Inquiry into the Causes of the Decline of Historical Painting, describing himself on the title-page as "historical painter, formerly lecturer in fine arts at the Royal Institution of Great Britain". To the Inquiry he appended a description of his painting The Banquet of Plato, which he was then exhibiting at his home in Charles Street, St James's Square, along with some press notices of the work. In 1839 he showed two small works at the British Institution, and in 1844 he contributed a large cartoon depicting the signing of Magna Carta to the exhibition held at Westminster Hall to choose artists to decorate the rebuilt Houses of Parliament.

== Works ==
The boxer Thomas Belcher painted by Guest

- Portrait of the sculptor Joseph Wilton (1803)
- Madonna and Child (1804)
- Bearing the Dead Body of Patroclus to the Camp, Achilles's Grief (1805)
- Penelope unravelling the web (1806)
- Cupid wrestling with Pan; an allegory (1808)
- Venus recumbent and Cupids (1809)
- Clorinda (1811)
- Cupid and Psyche (1811)
- The Second Appearance of the Messiah (1834)
- The Judgement of Hercules (1834)
- The Prism (1838)
- Phaeton driving the Chariot of the Sun (1838)
