= Thaïs =

Ancient Greek hetaira

Thaïs Θαΐς
- Queen of Egypt
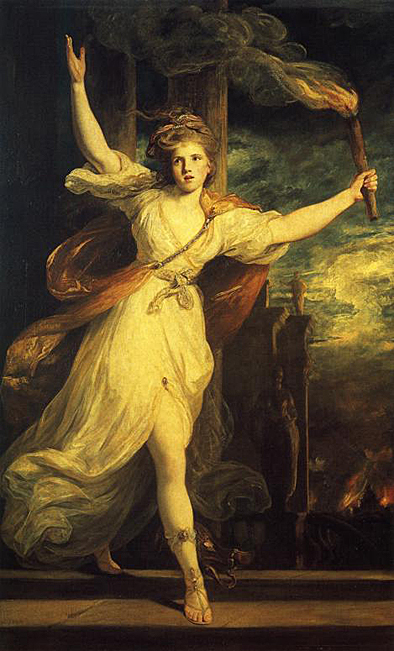
- Thaïs of Athens with Torch (1781) by Joshua Reynolds
- Predecessor: Eurydice II
- Successor: Artakama
- Born: fl. 4th century BCE; Athens, Greece
- Spouse: Ptolemy I Soter
- Dynasty: Ptolemaic
- Occupation: Hetaira,singer,musician

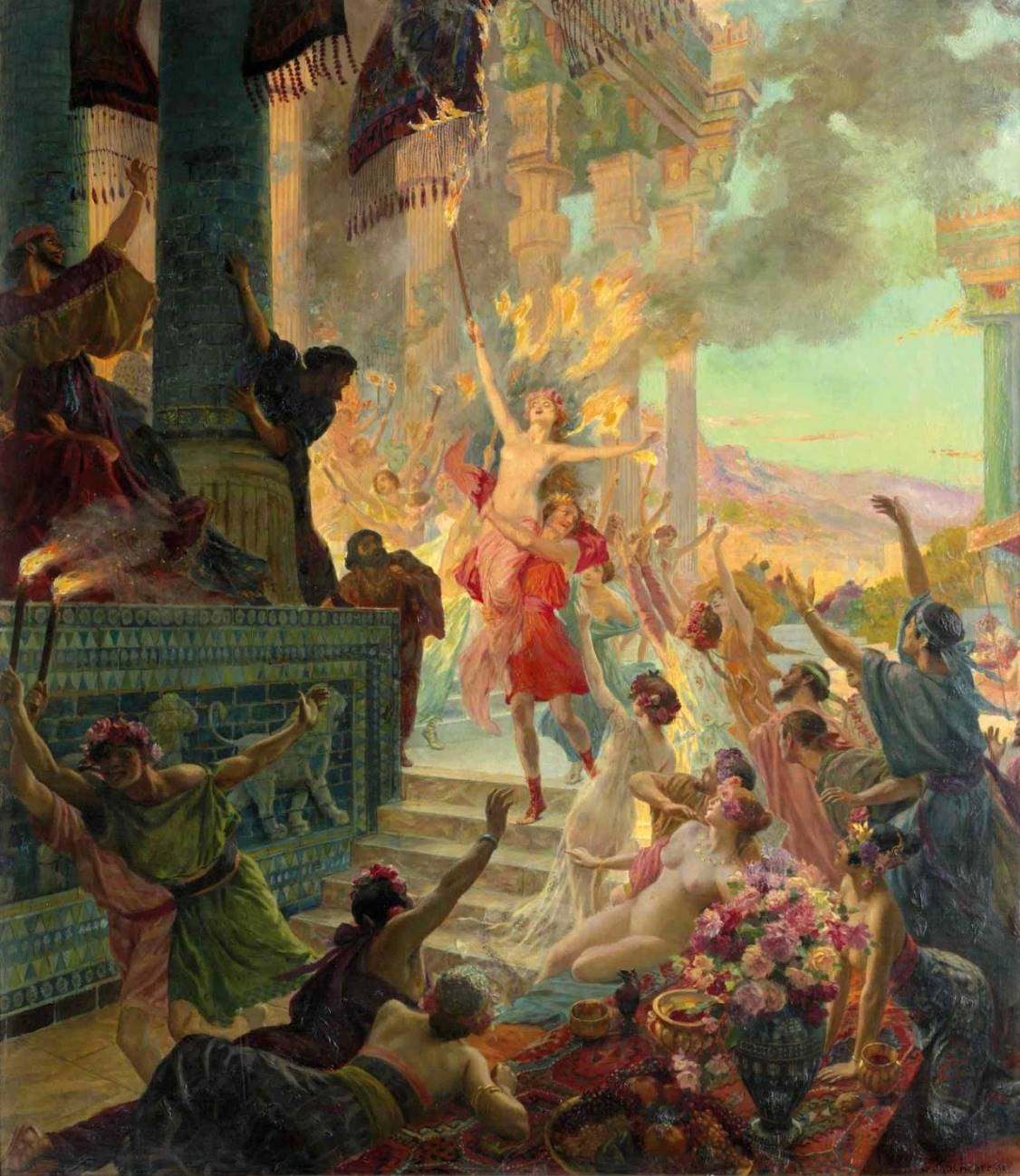
Thaïs leading the destruction of the palace of Persepolis, as imagined in Thaïs by Georges-Antoine Rochegrosse, 1890.

Thaïs (/ˈθaɪs/; Greek: Θαΐς; fl. 4th century BCE) was a Greek hetaira who accompanied Alexander the Great on his military campaigns. Likely from Athens, she is most famous for having instigated the burning of Persepolis, the capital city of the Achaemenid Persian Empire, after it was conquered by Alexander's army in 330 BCE. At the time, Thaïs was the lover of Ptolemy I Soter, who was one of Alexander's close companions and generals. It has been suggested that she may also have been Alexander's lover on the basis of a statement by the Greek rhetorician Athenaeus, who writes that Alexander liked to "keep Thaïs about him" without directly classifying the nature of their relationship as intimate; this may simply have meant that he enjoyed her company, as she is said to have been very witty and entertaining. Athenaeus also states that after Alexander's death in 323 BCE, Thaïs married Ptolemy and bore three of his children.

== Role in Alexander's conquest of Persia ==
=== Burning of Persepolis ===
Thaïs supposedly came from Athens and accompanied Alexander throughout his campaigns in Asia. She came to the attention of history when, in 330 BC, Alexander burned down the palace of Persepolis, the principal residence of the defeated Achaemenid dynasty, after a drinking party. Thaïs was present at the party and gave a speech which convinced Alexander to burn the palace. Cleitarchus claims that the destruction was a whim; Plutarch and Diodorus assert that it was intended as retribution for Xerxes' burning of the old Temple of Athena on the Acropolis in Athens (the site of the extant Parthenon) in 480 BC during the second Persian invasion of Greece.

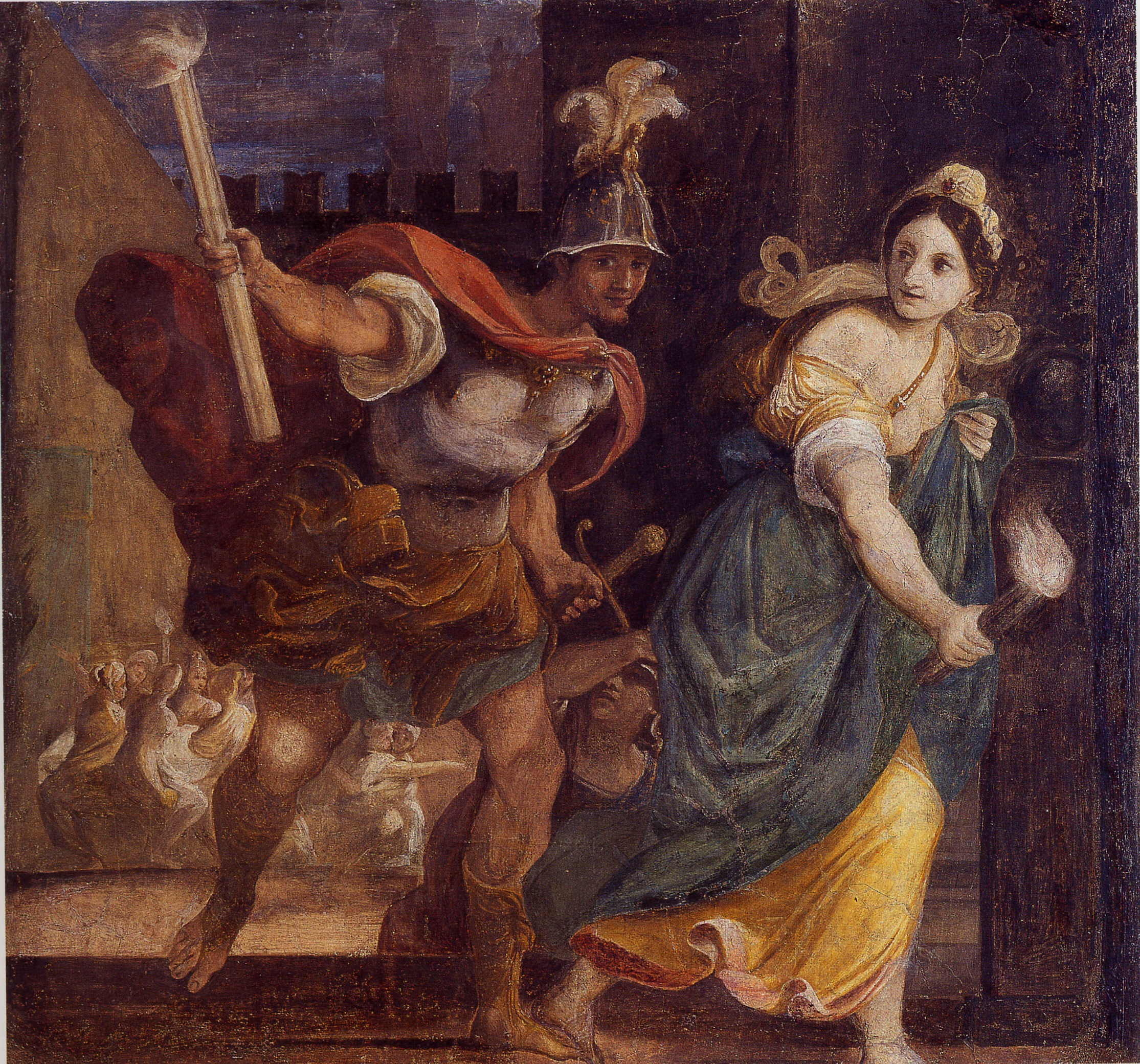
Thaïs leads Alexander to start the fire, Ludovico Carracci, c. 1592

When the king [Alexander] had caught fire at their words, all leaped up from their couches and passed the word along to form a victory procession in honour of Dionysus. Promptly many torches were gathered. Female musicians were present at the banquet, so the king led them all out for the comus to the sound of voices and flutes and pipes, Thaïs the courtesan leading the whole performance. She was the first, after the king, to hurl her blazing torch into the palace. As the others all did the same, immediately the entire palace area was consumed, so great was the conflagration. It was remarkable that the impious act of Xerxes, king of the Persians, against the acropolis at Athens should have been repaid in kind after many years by one woman, a citizen of the land which had suffered it, and in sport.

— Diodorus of Sicily (XVII.72)

=== Relationship with Alexander ===
It has been argued that Thaïs was at this time Alexander's lover. T. D. Ogden suggests that Ptolemy took her over at some later point, though other writers believe she was always Ptolemy's companion.

== Later life and family ==
Thaïs's subsequent career is uncertain. According to Athenaeus (who lived more than five centuries later), she married her lover Ptolemy, who became king of Egypt, after Alexander's death. Even if they were not actually married, their relationship seems to have acquired "quasi-legal status".

=== Children ===
She has three children with Ptolemy, two boys and a girl:

- Lagus, who is known from a reference to his victory in a chariot race in the Lycaea, an Arcadian festival, in 308/307.
- Alexander Leontiscus, who appears to have been in Cyprus with his sister, as he recorded there as a prisoner taken by Demetrius Poliorcetes in 307 or 306 after his invasion of the island. He was later sent home to Ptolemy.
- Eirene, who was given in marriage to Eunostos, king of Soloi in Cyprus.

Whatever the legal status of their relationship, Thaïs’ role in Egypt is unclear. Ptolemy had other wives, first Eurydice of Egypt, and later Berenice I of Egypt, who became his principal consort and mother of his heir.

The date of Thaïs's death is unknown.

== In literature ==
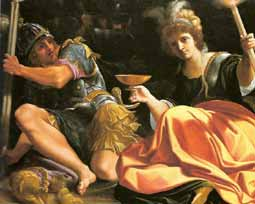
Lodovico Carracci, Alexander and Thaïs

Her larger-than-life persona has resulted in characters named Thaïs appearing in several literary works, the most famous of which are listed below. In the post-classical period she is commonly portrayed in literature and art as Alexander's rather than Ptolemy's lover.

=== Classical ===
In Terence's play Eunuchus, there is a female protagonist who is a courtesan named Thaïs after the historical figure. Thaïs' words from the play are quoted in Cicero's essay De Amicitia.

In Ovid's Remedia Amoris (383), Thaïs is contrasted with Andromache, the epitome of the loyal wife, while Thaïs is the epitome of sex. Thaïs, says Ovid, is the subject of his art.

Athenaeus's book The Deipnosophists records a number of remarks attributed to Thaïs. She "said once to a boastful lover of hers, who had borrowed some goblets from a great many people, and said that he meant to break them up, and make others of them, 'You will destroy what belongs to each private person'." Another time, when asked who she was visiting she said "To dwell with Aegeus, great Pandion's son," - a witty way of describing an unknown patron as a smelly goat (Aegeus Sea, or Goat Sea, was named after Aegeus the smelly goat son born of Pandion from a bestial relationship).

=== Post-Classical ===
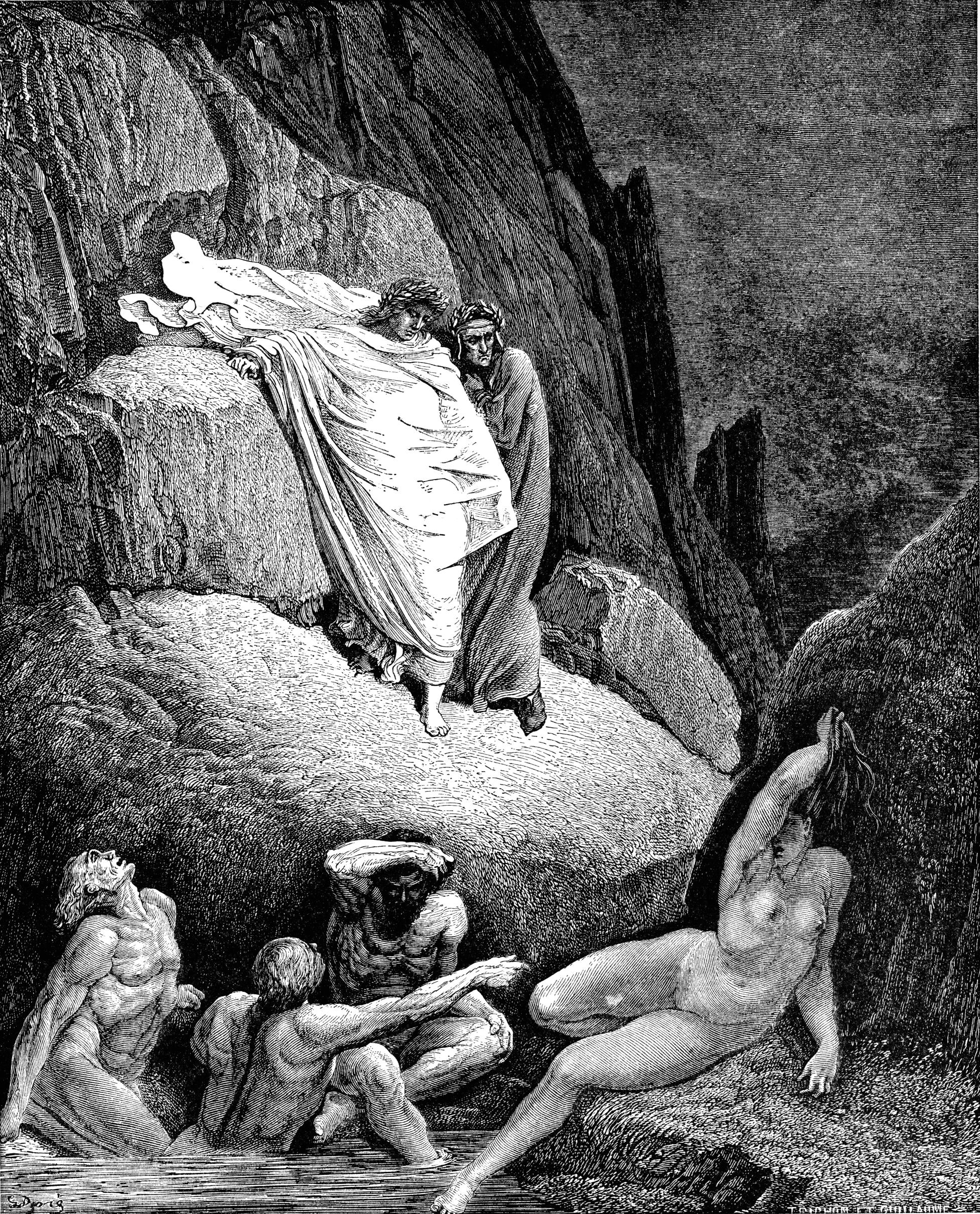
Dante and Virgil pass Thaïs in hell. Illustration by Gustave Doré of the Divine Comedy, Inferno

In the Divine Comedy, a character called Thaïs is one of just a few women whom Dante Alighieri sees on his journey through Hell (Inferno, XVIII, 133–136). She is located in the circle of the flatterers, plunged in a trench of excrement, having been consigned there, we are told by Virgil, for having uttered to her lover that she was "marvellously" fond of him. Dante's Thaïs may or may not be intended to represent the historical courtesan, but the words ascribed to her derive from Cicero's quotations from Terence.

Thaïs is mentioned as one of the famous historical beauties in François Villon's "Ballade des dames du temps jadis" (1461).

Thaïs and Alexander the Great are conjured by Faustus in Christopher Marlowe's play Doctor Faustus for the amusement of Holy Roman Emperor Charles V.

Thaïs appears as Alexander's mistress in John Dryden's poem Alexander's Feast, or the Power of Music (1697), which begins with a description of Alexander enthroned with "the lovely Thaïs by his side" who sat "like a blooming eastern bride". The poem's account of the feast ends by comparing Thaïs to Helen of Troy: "Thaïs led the way/To light him to his prey/And like another Helen, fired another Troy." The poem was later set to music as an oratorio, also called Alexander's Feast, by George Frederick Handel. Robert Herrick (1591–1674) in "What Kind of Mistress He Would Have" concludes, "Let her Lucrece all day be, Thaïs in the night to me, Be she such as neither will, Famish me, nor overfill."

Thaïs is a supporting character in two novels by Mary Renault about Alexander the Great: Fire from Heaven and The Persian Boy, as well as in Renault's biography of Alexander, "The Nature of Alexander." She is also a supporting character in Stealing Fire, a novel by Jo Graham about the immediate aftermath of Alexander's death.

Thaïs is the heroine of a 1972 novel by the Russian author Ivan Efremov, Thaïs of Athens. It chronicles her life from meeting Alexander the Great through to her time as queen of Memphis in Egypt.

Other literary figures named Thaïs are references to Thaïs of Alexandria, a Christian saint of a later period, about whom a French novel and an opera were written.
