= Royal Academy Exhibition of 1781 =

1781 art exhibition in London

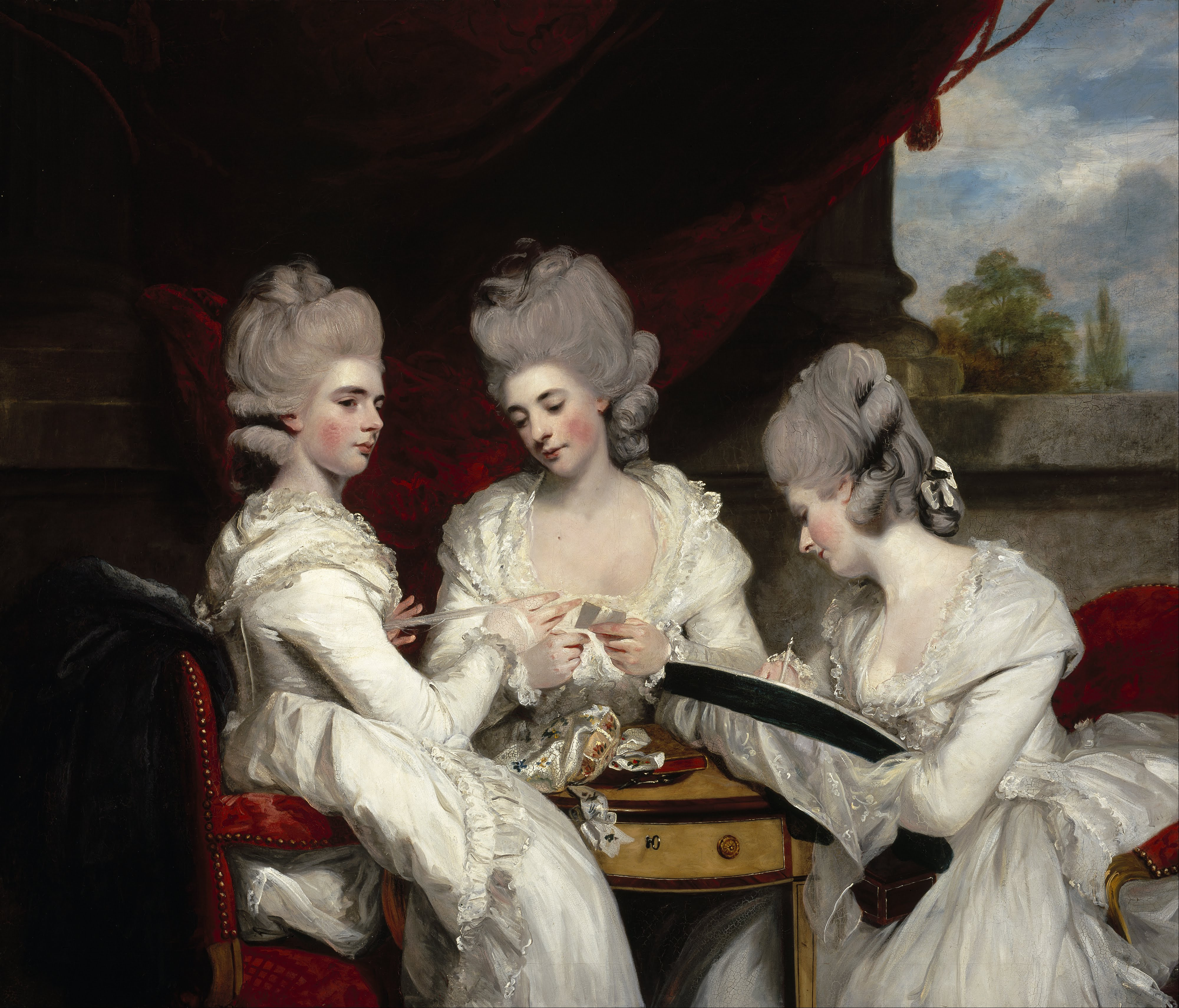
The Ladies Waldegrave by Joshua Reynolds

The Royal Academy Exhibition of 1781 was the thirteenth annual Summer Exhibition of the British Royal Academy of Arts. It was held at Somerset House in London between 30 April and 2 June 1781. It featured submissions from leading artists and architects of the Georgian era.

The President of the Royal Academy Joshua Reynolds submitted fifteen works, by far the largest representation of any artist. His The Death of Dido was on an identical subject to Dido by the Swiss artist Henry Fuseli, and the two were frequently compared. Reynolds' leading rival Thomas Gainsborough sent in several paintings. His submissions included Portrait of Queen Charlotte, a Royal Commission. Benjamin West displayed a neoclassical history painting Paetus and Arria, its whereabouts are now unknown.

The The Public Advertiser noted that Joseph Wright of Derby had displayed several typical examples of his works relying on moonlight and lamplight for a Chiaroscuro effect, but particularly praised his more naturalistic Portrait of Sir Brooke Boothby. Amongst the other works on display was a second version of his earlier success A Philosopher by Lamplight. William Redmore Bigg's A Lady and Her Children Relieving a Cottager was a genre painting. Paul Sandby showed six pictures showing military encampments around the capital during the Gordon Riots of the previous June. Despite being a newly elected member of the Royal Academy, the Anglo-American artist chose to exhibit his large The Death of the Earl of Chatham privately at Spring Gardens in Pall Mall.

== Gallery ==
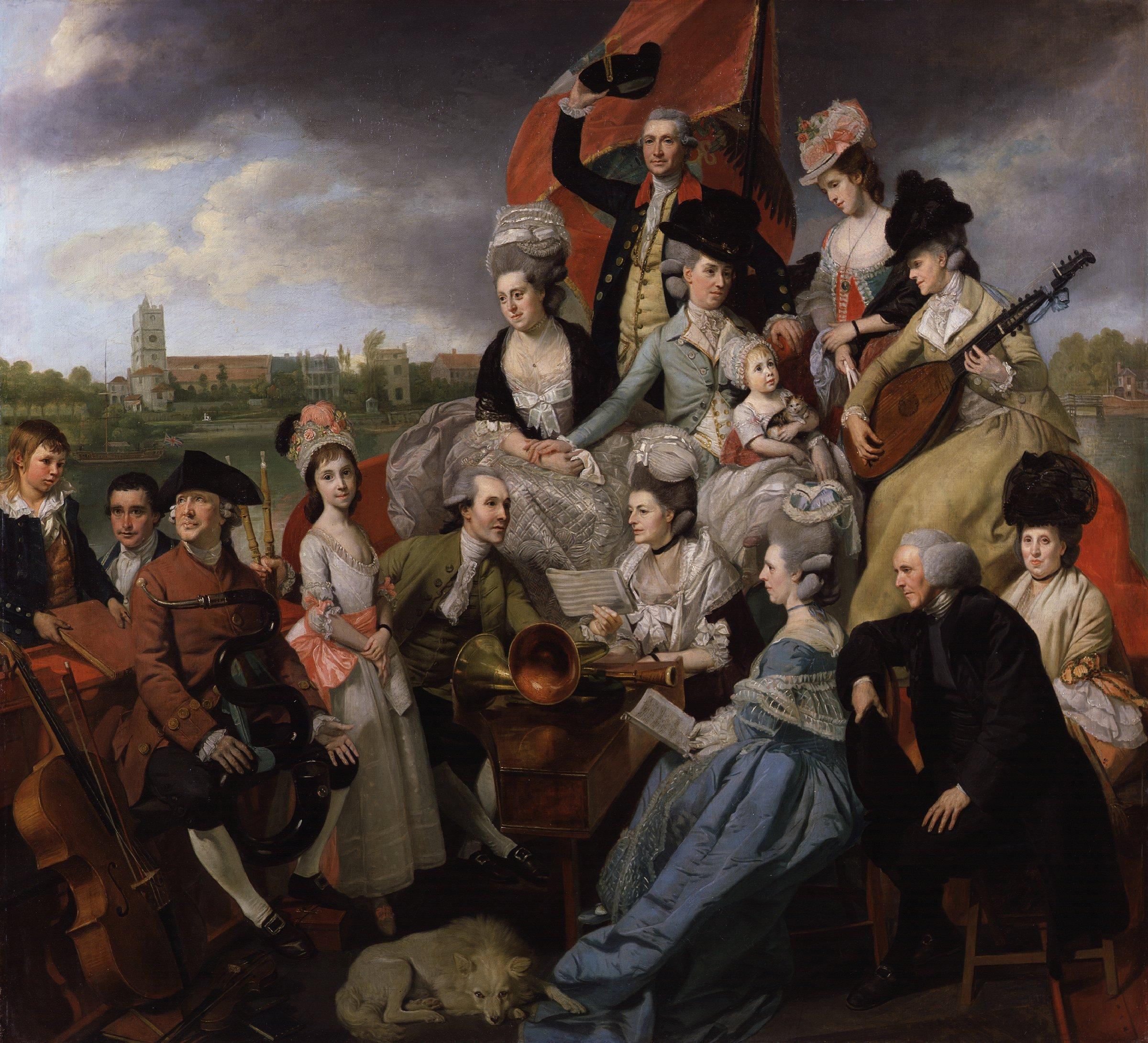
The Sharp Family by Johann Zoffany

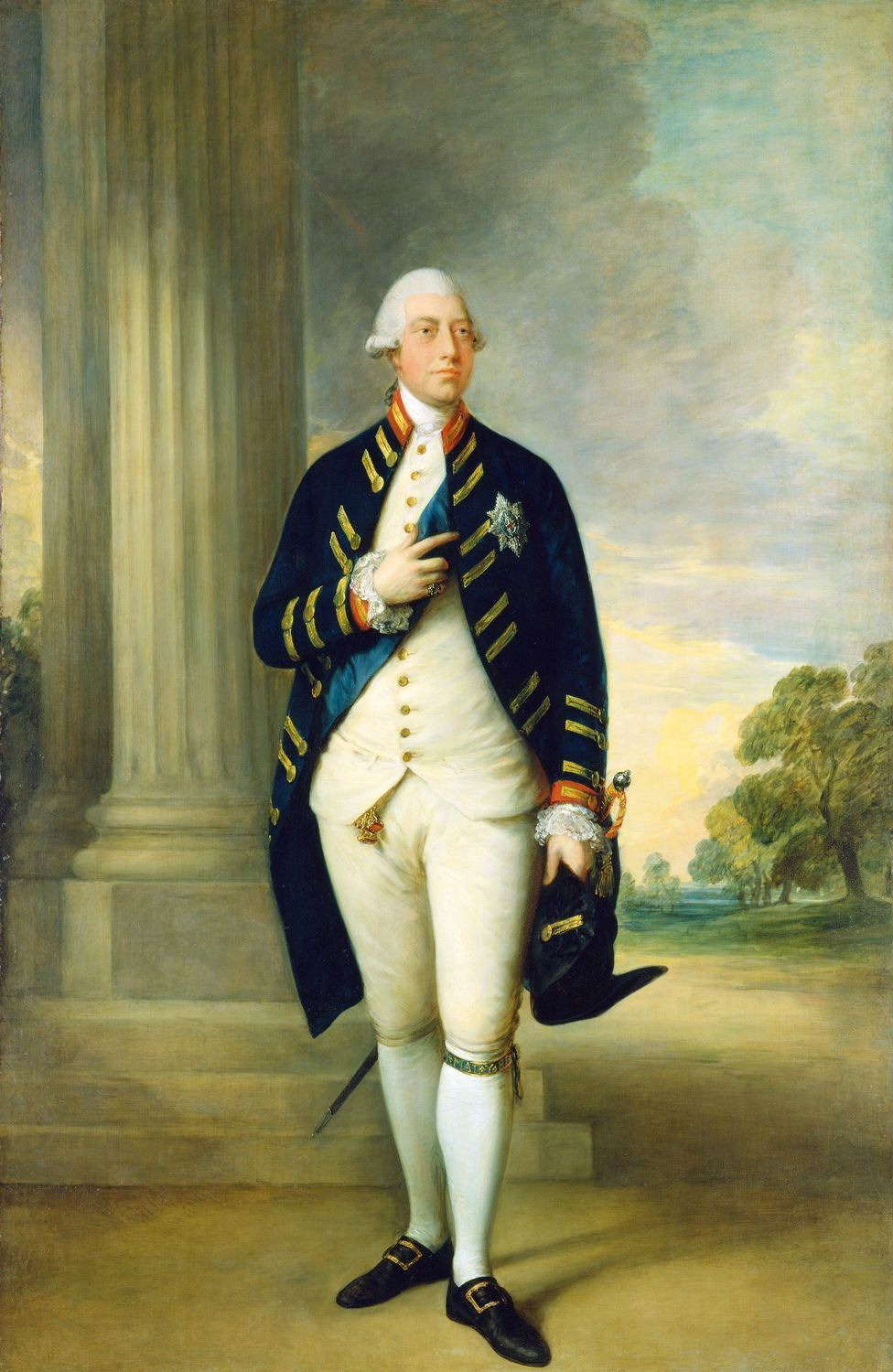
Portrait of George III by Thomas Gainsborough

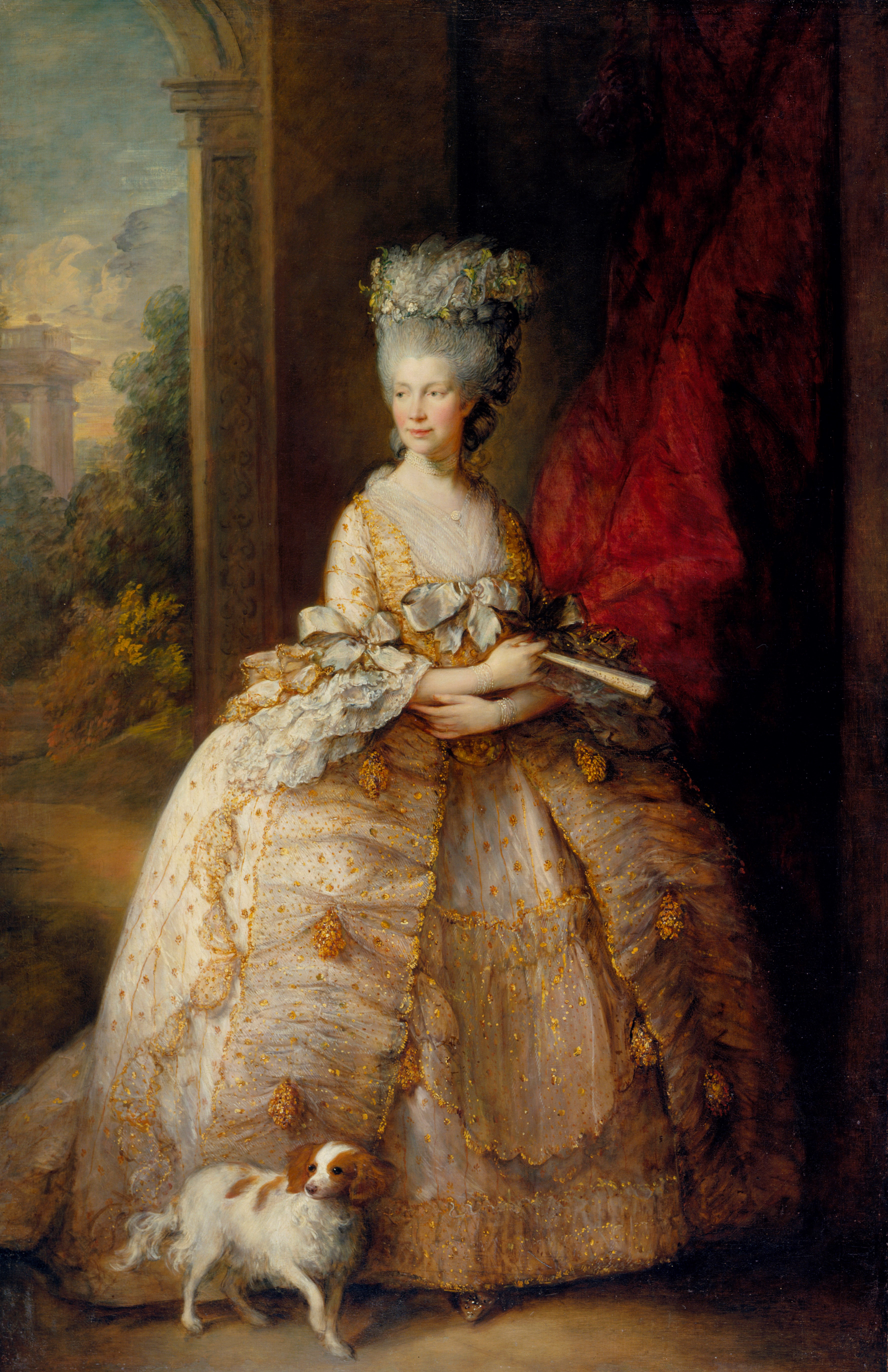
Portrait of Queen Charlotte by Thomas Gainsborough

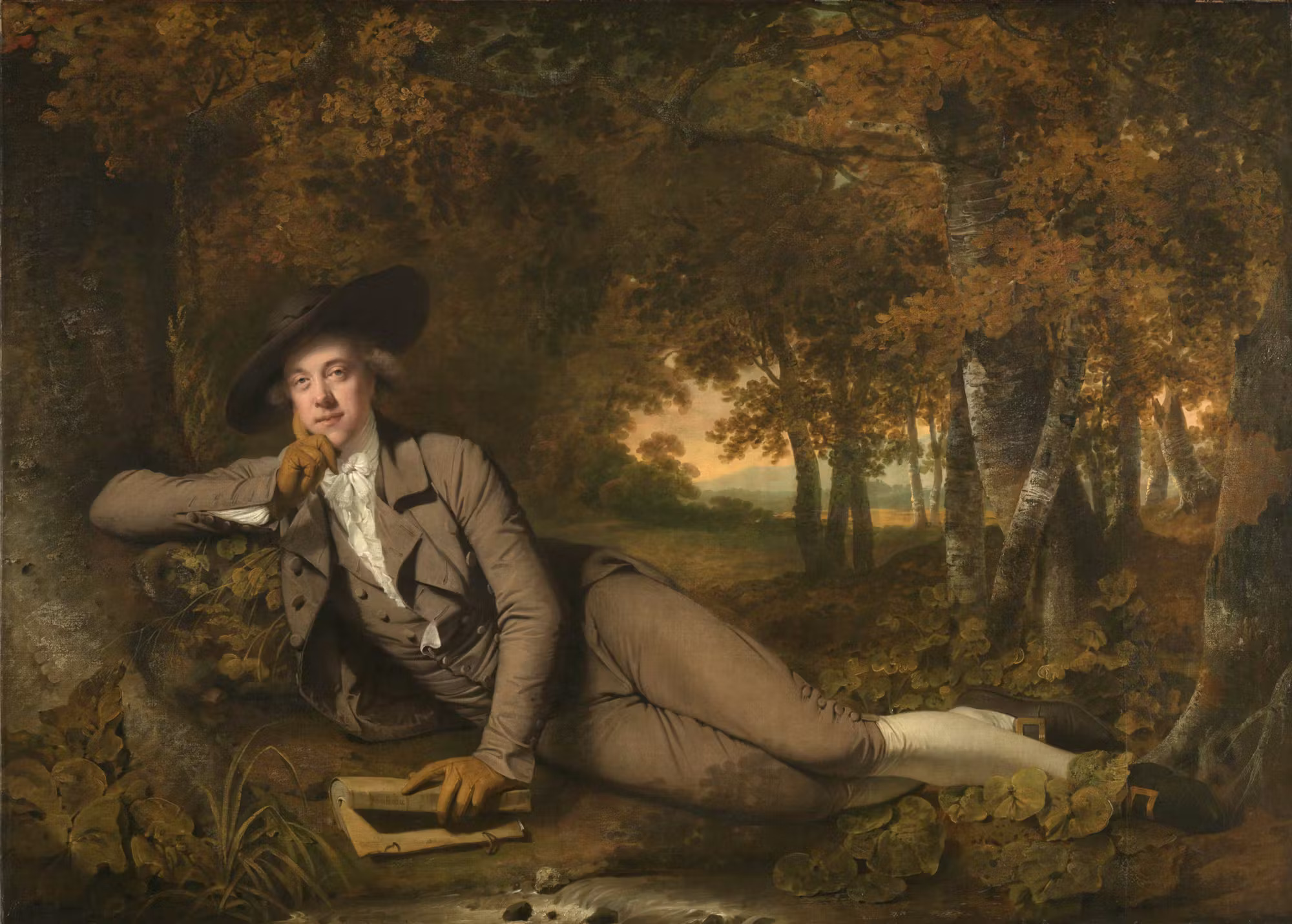
Portrait of Sir Brooke Boothby by Joseph Wright of Derby

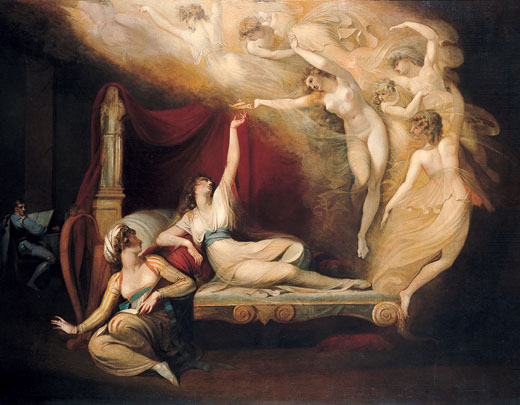
The Vision of Catherine of Aragon by Henry Fuseli

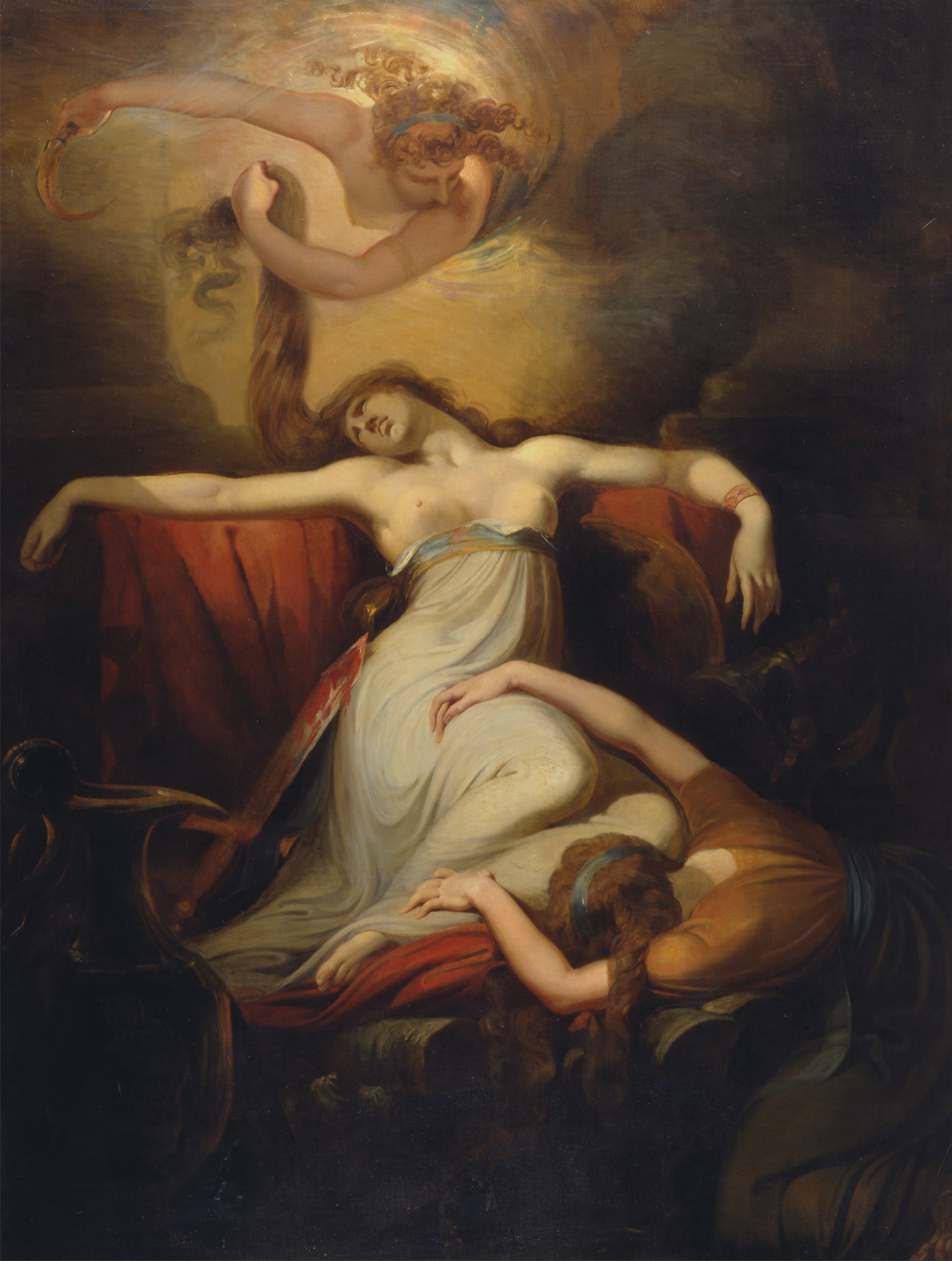
Dido by Henry Fuseli

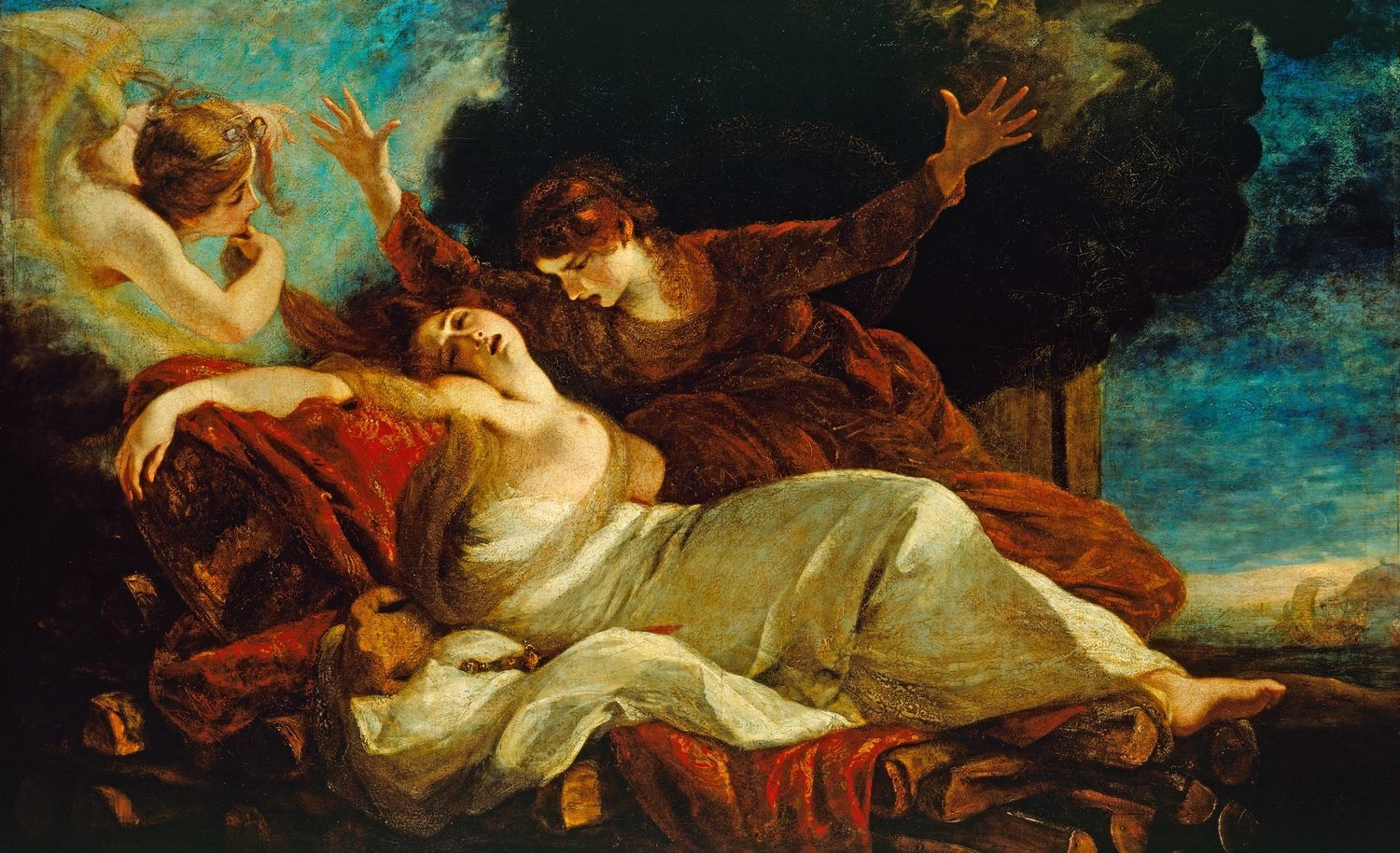
The Death of Dido by Joshua Reynolds

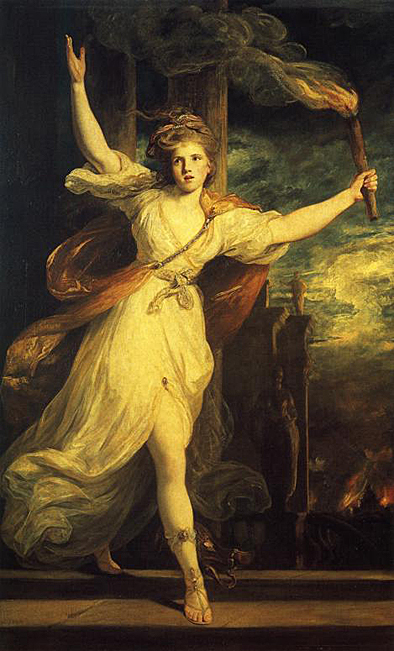
Thaïs by Joshua Reynolds

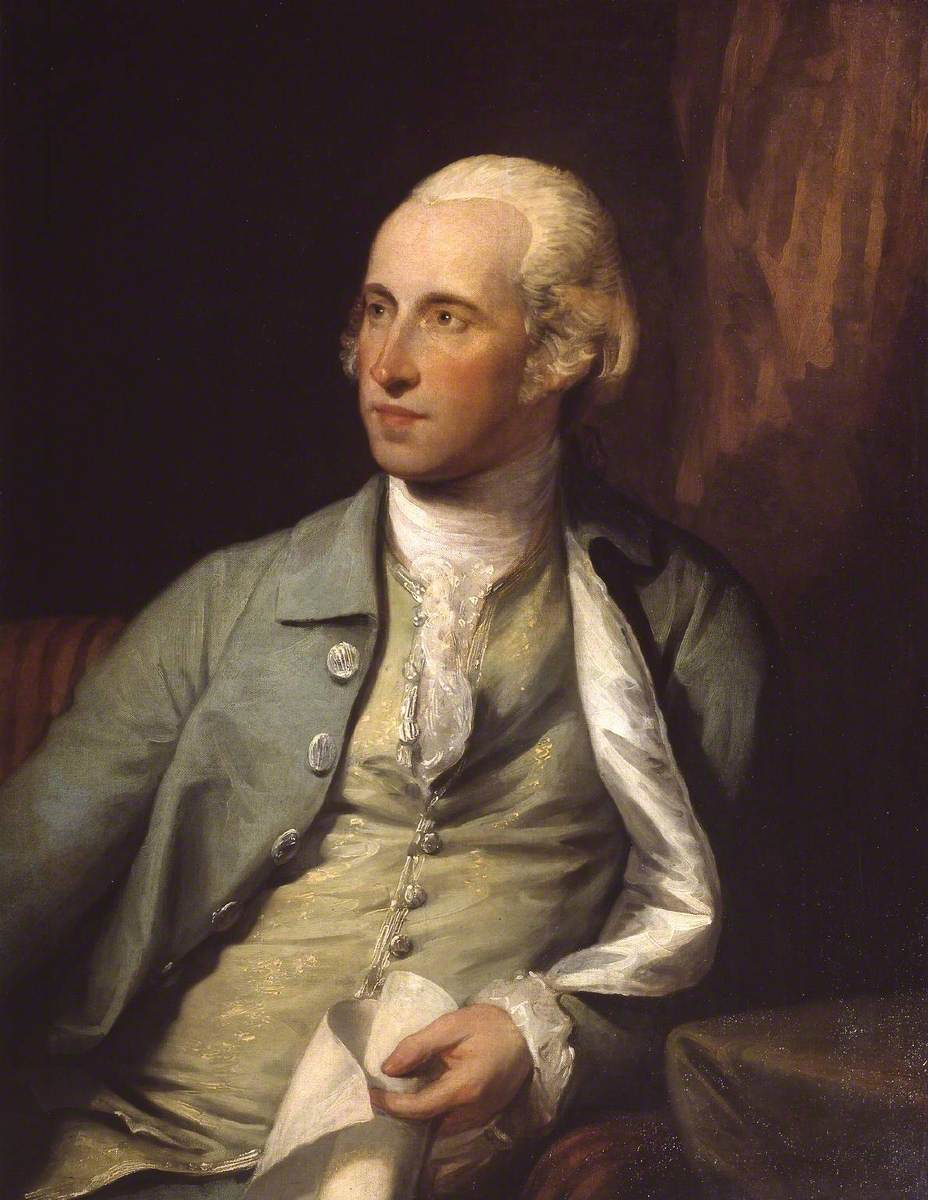
Portrait of Benjamin West by Gilbert Stuart

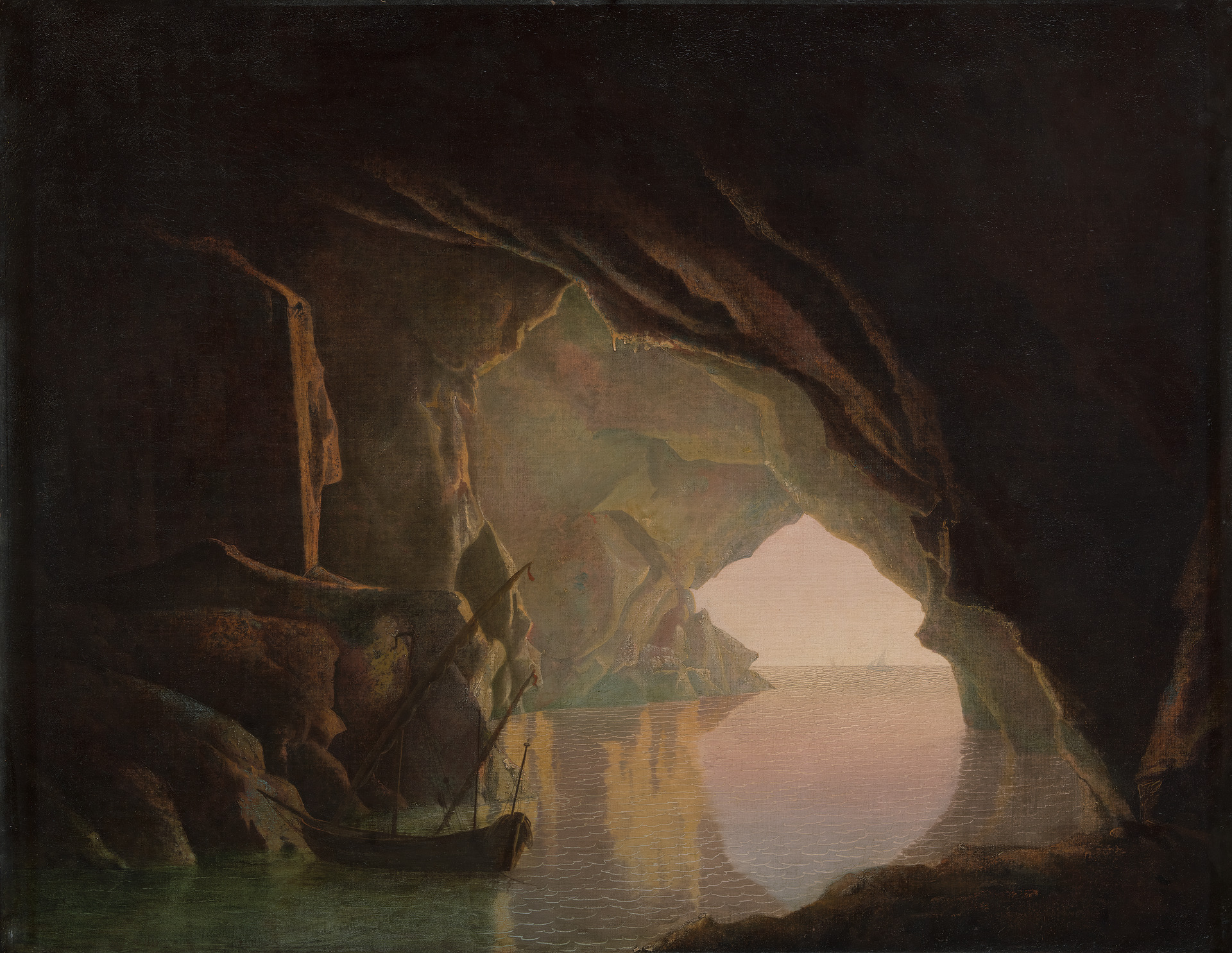
A Grotto in the Gulf of Salerno, Sunset by Joseph Wright of Derby

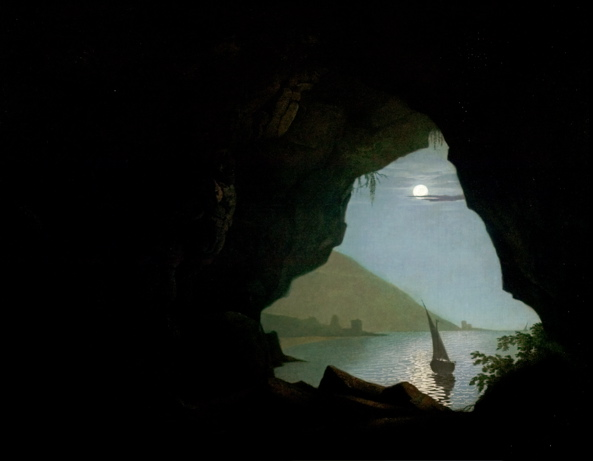
A Grotto in the Gulf of Salerno, Moonlight by Joseph Wright of Derby

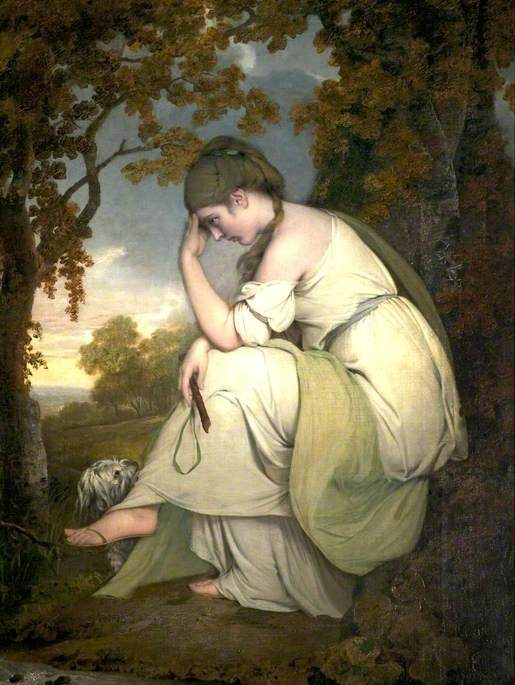
Maria and Her Dog by Joseph Wright of Derby

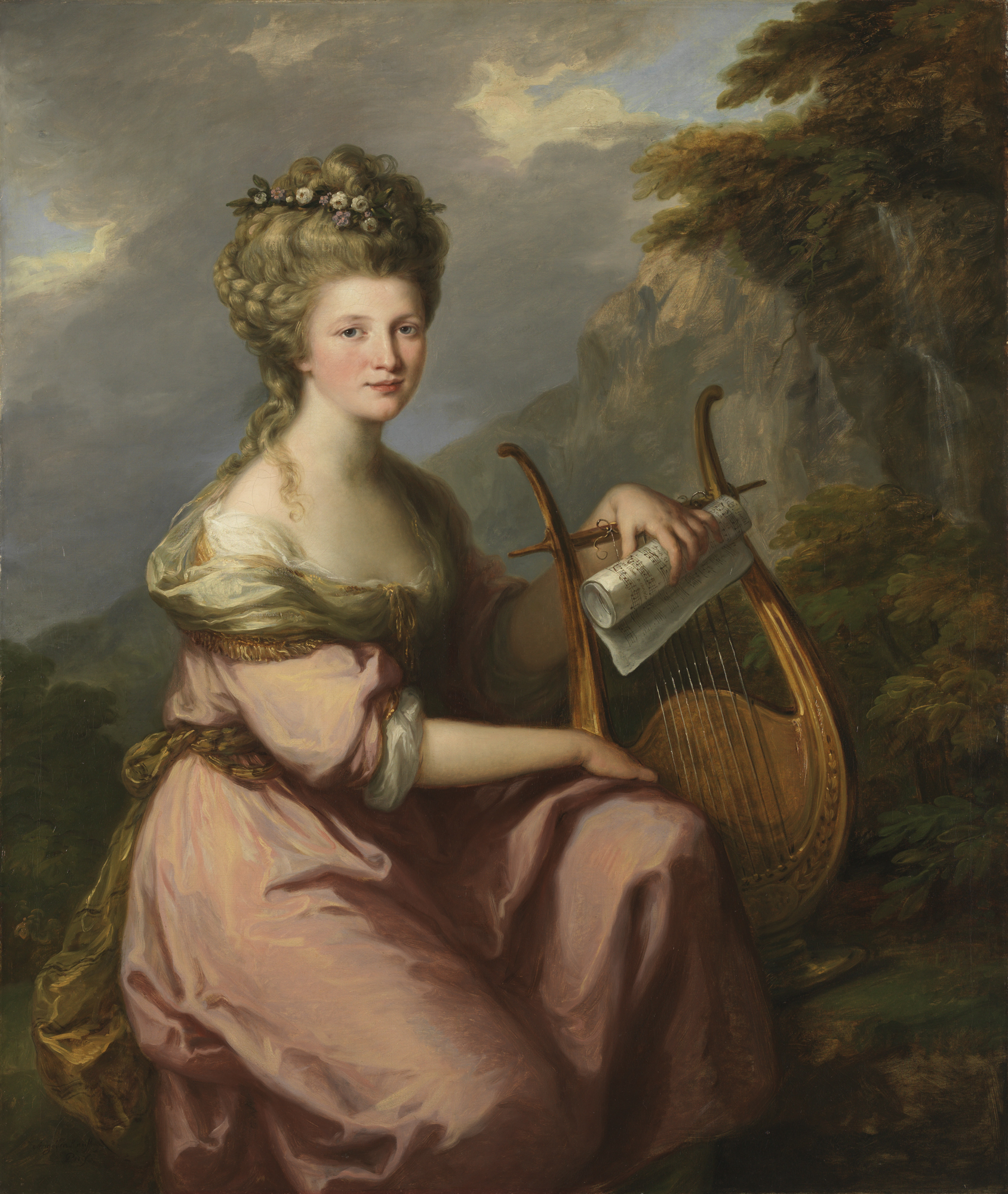
Portrait of Sarah Bates as a Muse by Angelica Kauffman

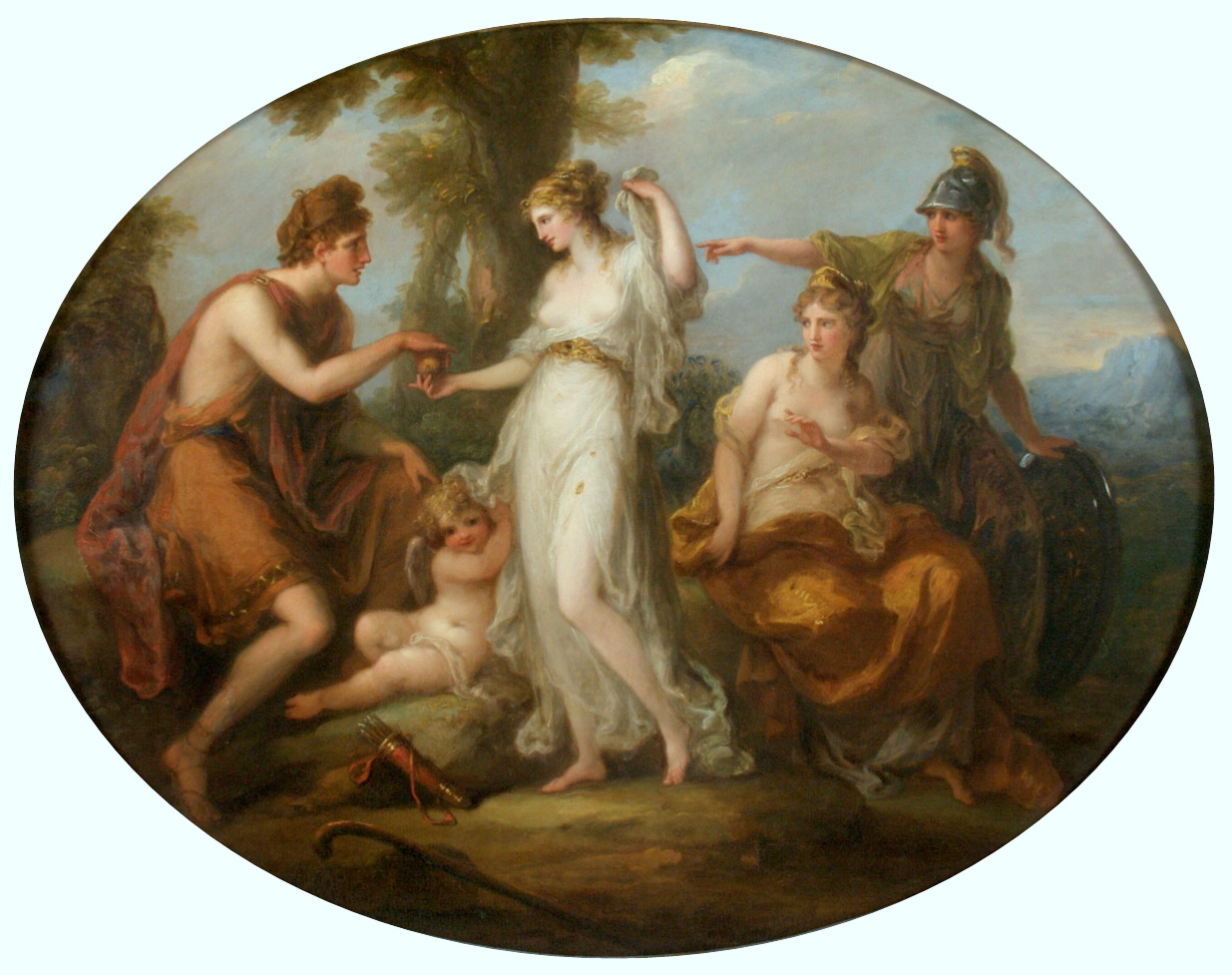
The Judgment of Paris by Angelica Kauffman

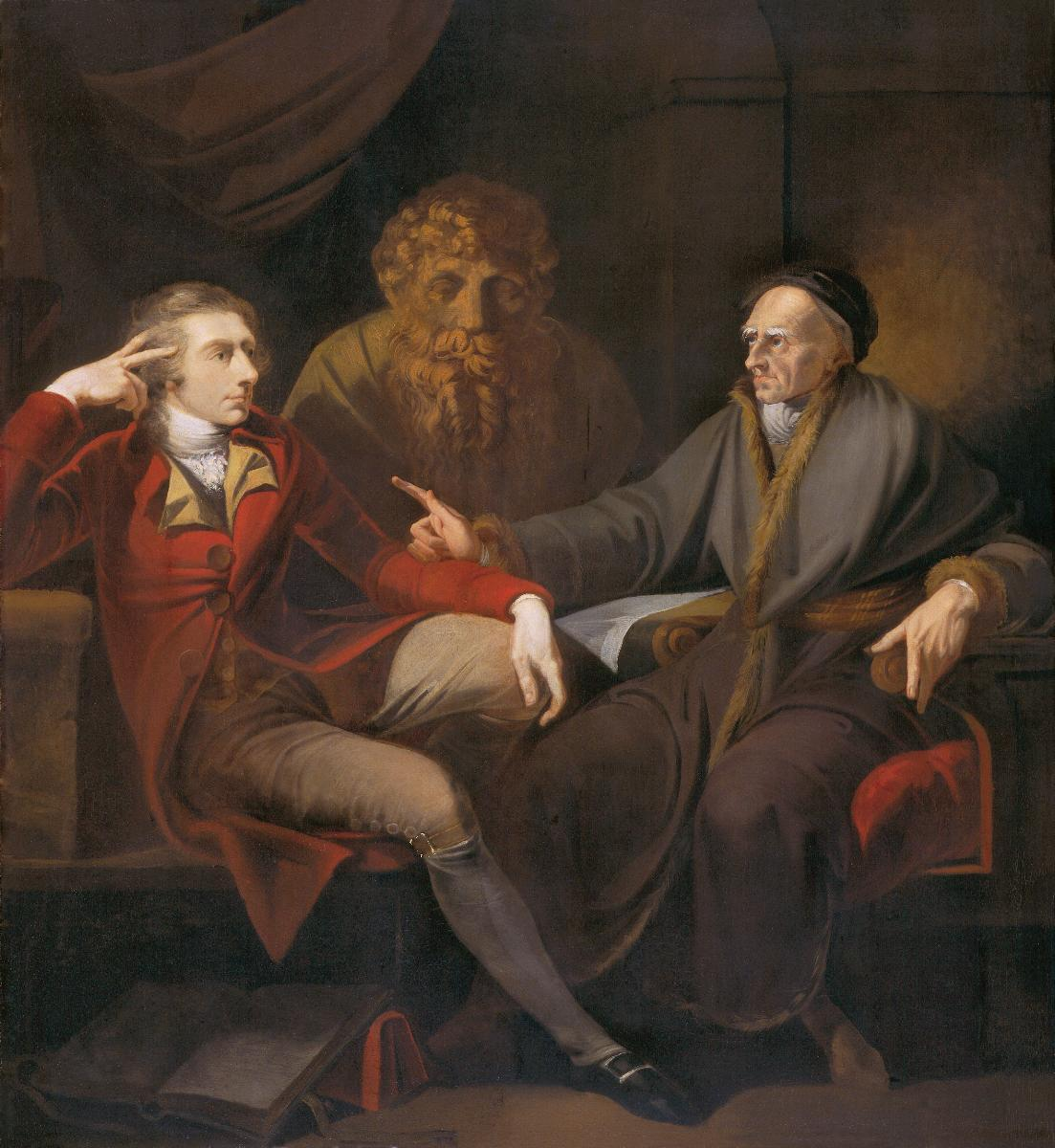
A Conversation by Henry Fuseli

Lavinia, Daughter of the Once Rich Acasto, Discovered Gleaning by Edward Penny

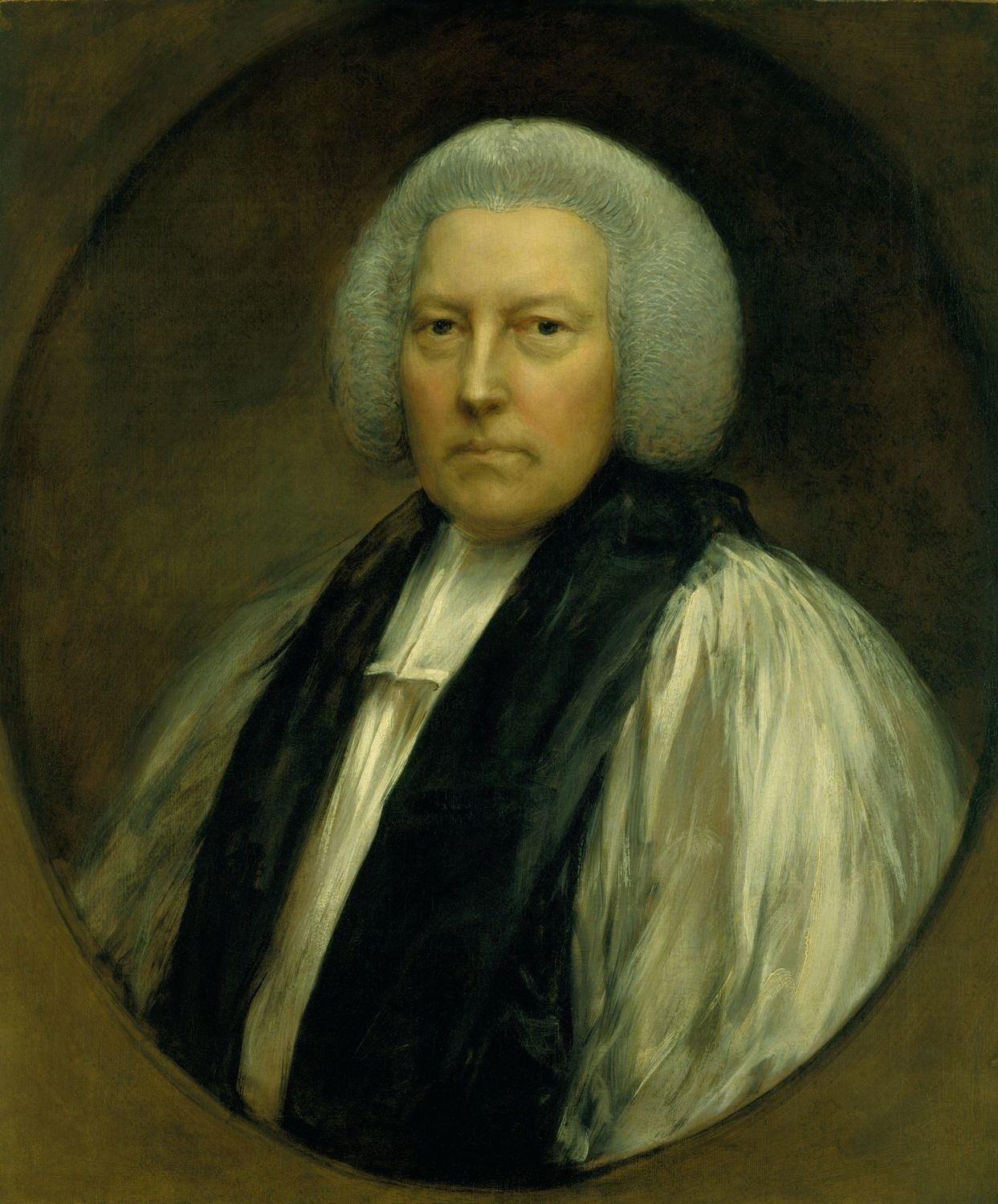
Portrait of Bishop of Worcester by Thomas Gainsborough

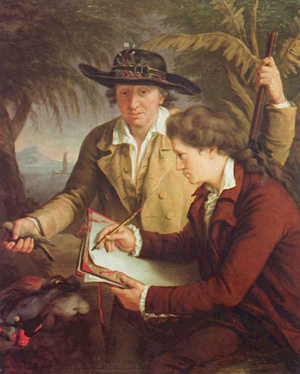
Portrait of Johann Reinhold Forster and His Son by John Francis Rigaud

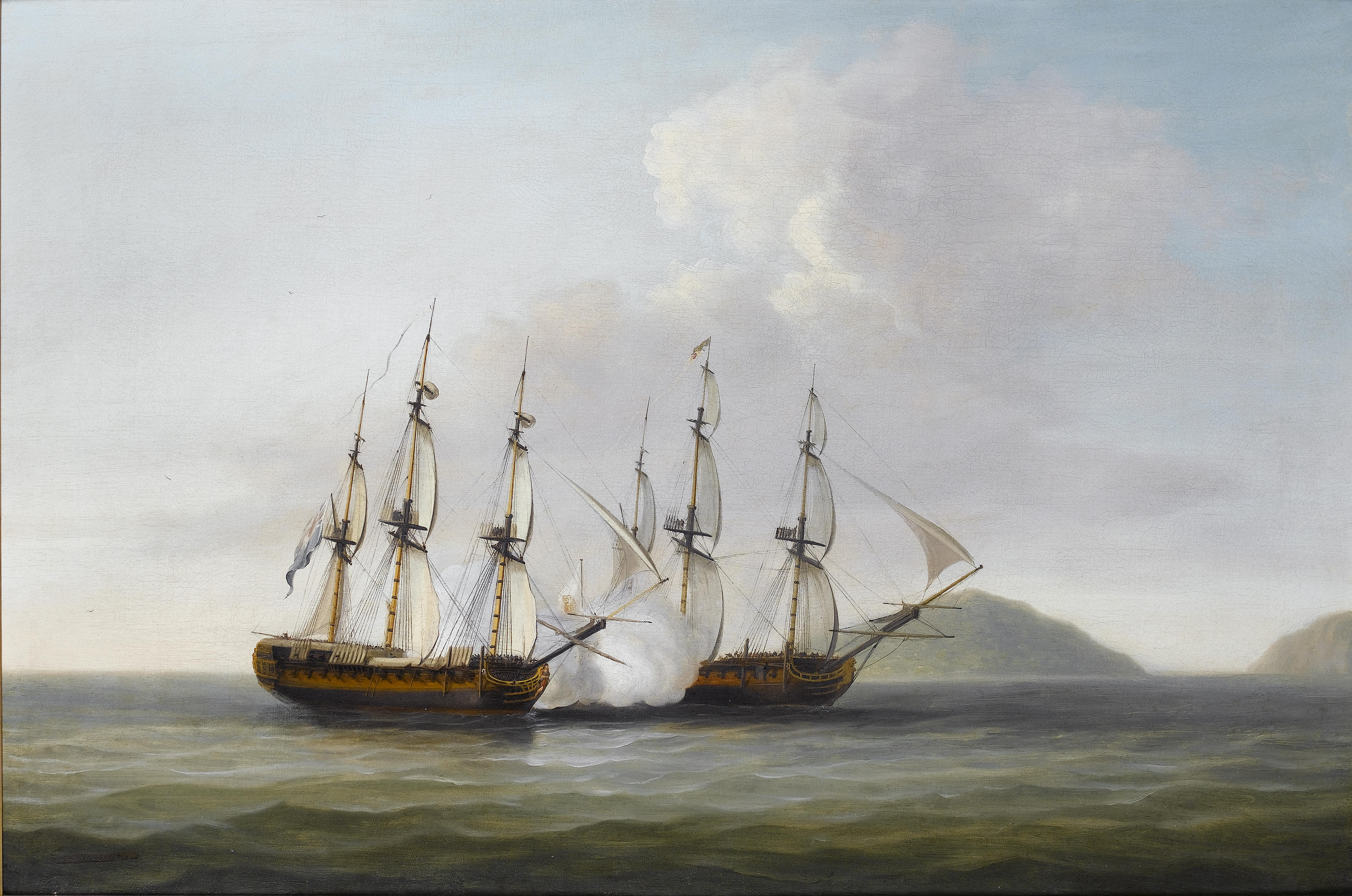
HMS Pearl Engaging the Santa Monica by Dominic Serres

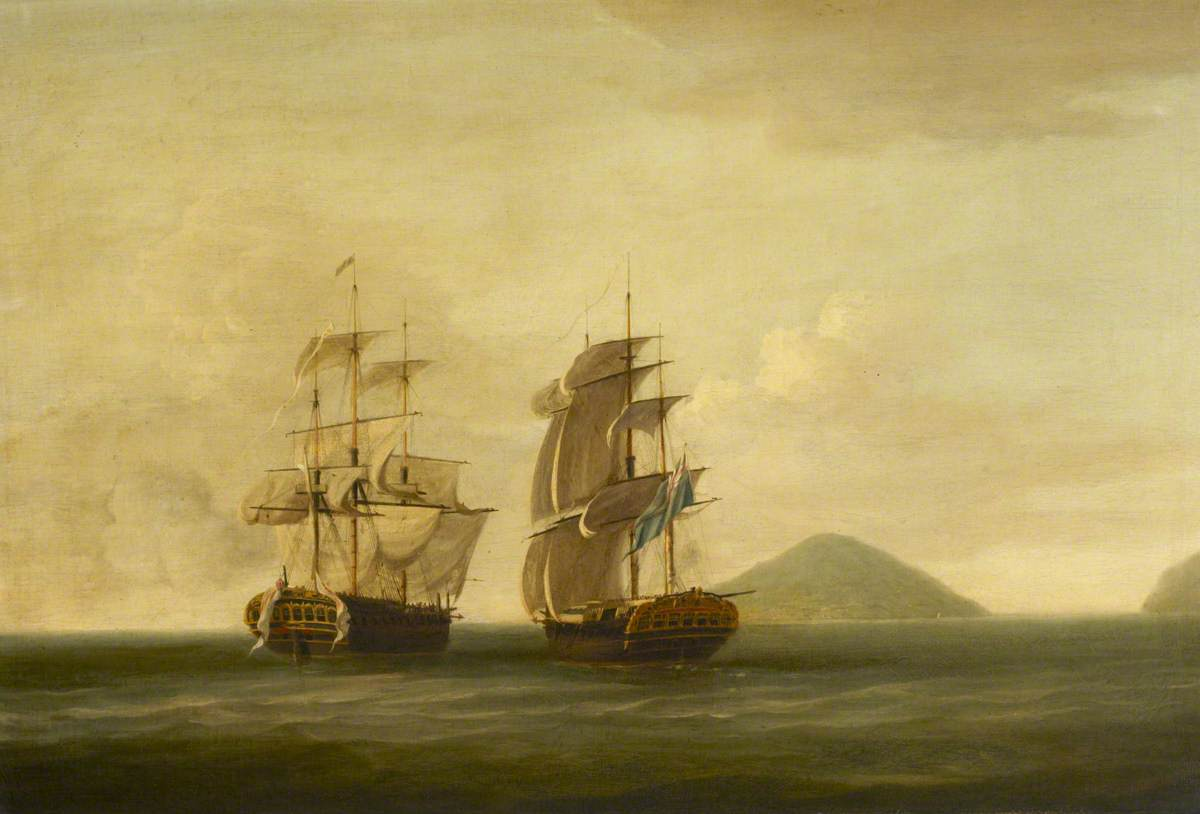
HMS Pearl Capturing the Esperance by Dominic Serres

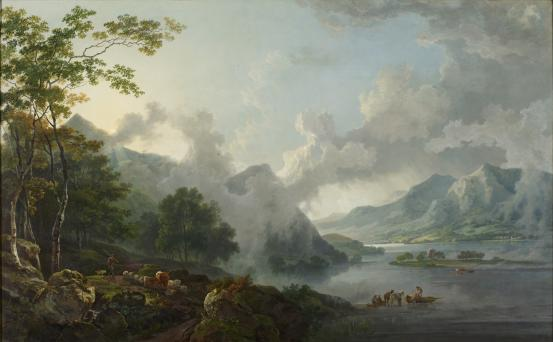
View of Windermere Lake by George Barret

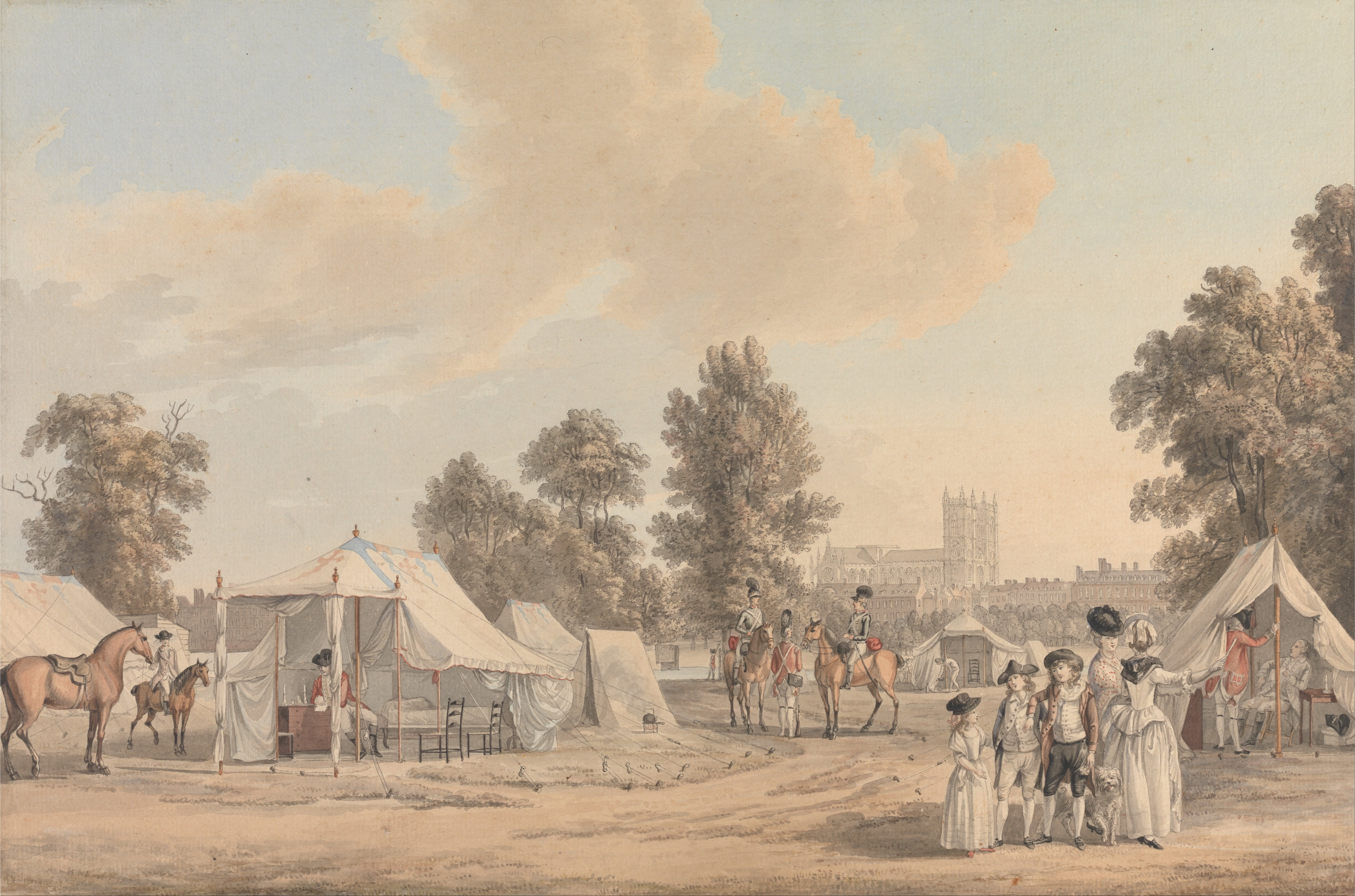
An Encampment in St. James Park During the Gordon Riots by Paul Sandby

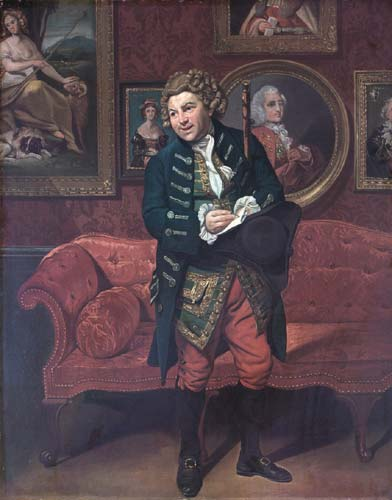
Robert Baddeley in School for Scandal by Johann Zoffany

== See also ==
- Salon of 1781, held at the Louvre in Paris

== Bibliography ==
- Hamilton, James. Gainsborough: A Portrait. Hachette UK, 2017.
- Hoock, Holger. Empires of the Imagination: Politics, War, and the Arts in the British World, 1750–1850. Profile Books, 2010.
- McIntyre, Ian. Joshua Reynolds: The Life and Times of the First President of the Royal Academy. Allen Lane, 2003.
- Myrone, Martin. Henry Fuseli. Tate Publishing, 2001.
