= Portrait of Queen Charlotte (Gainsborough) =

Painting by Thomas Gainsborough

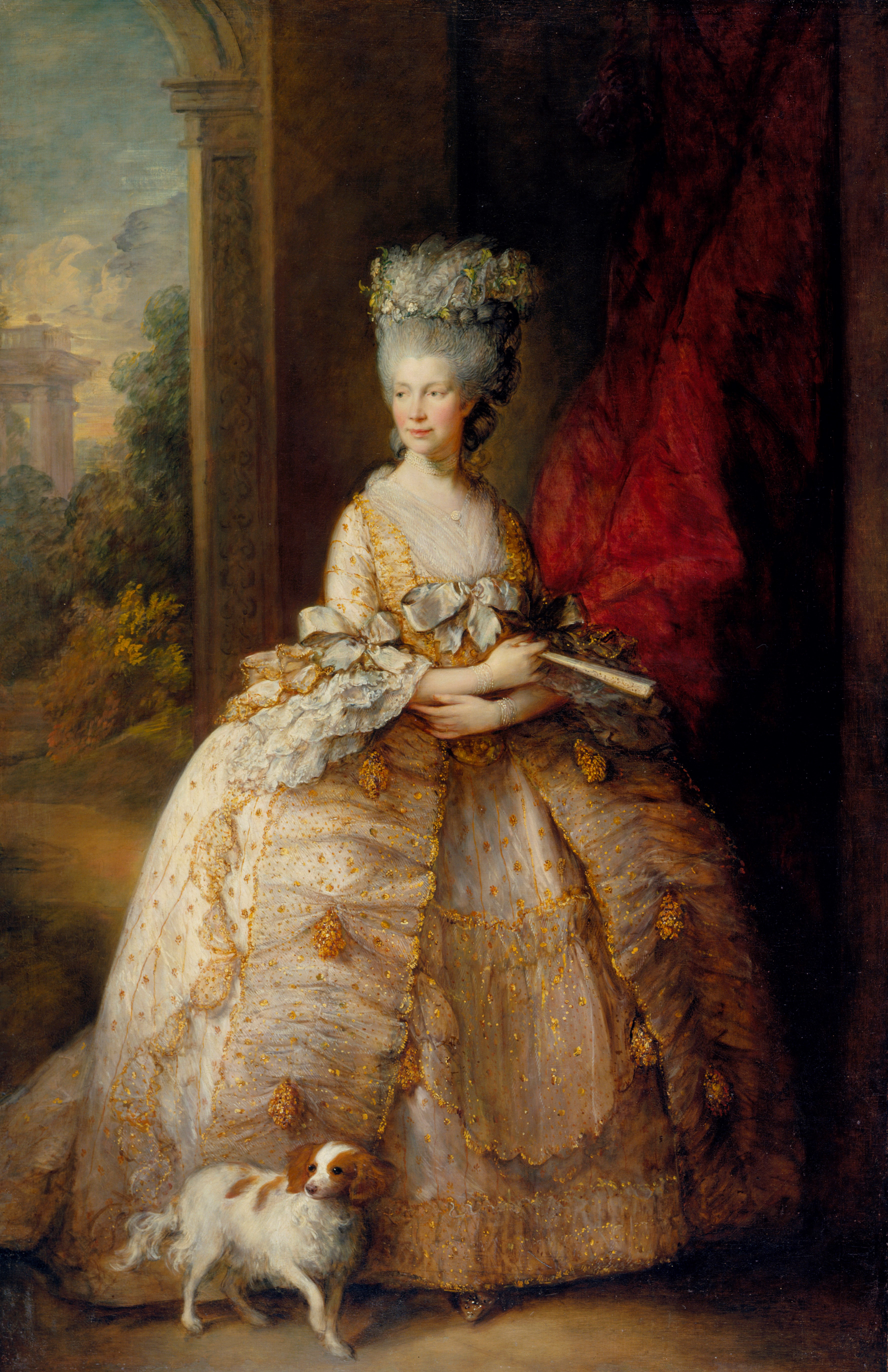
- Artist: Thomas Gainsborough
- Year: 1781
- Type: Oil on canvas, portrait painting
- Dimensions: 238.8 cm × 157.8 cm (94.0 in × 62.1 in)
- Location: Royal Collection; London

Portrait of Queen Charlotte is an oil on canvas portrait painting by the English artist Thomas Gainsborough, from 1781. It depicts Charlotte of Mecklenburg-Strelitz, the wife of George III and queen consort of Great Britain. It is held at the Royal Collection.

== History and description ==
The German-born Charlotte is portrayed at full-length accompanied by a small dog. An outdoor scene with an arch is seen at the left. She was the mother of two future monarchs George IV and William IV and was painted by a number of artists following her arrival in Britain in 1760. Aside from Gainsborough this included works by Johann Zoffany and later by Thomas Lawrence who produced his own Portrait of Queen Charlotte in 1789.

The work was commissioned by George III. Gainsborough also produced a companion piece featuring the king. According to James Northcote, Gainsborough (and his nephew and assistant Gainsborough Dupont) completed the drapery, including the Queen's billowing dress, in a single night. The work was shown at the Royal Academy's Summer Exhibition of 1781 at Somerset House. The king hung it in the dining room at Buckingham Palace and it has remained in the Royal Collection since.

The commission promoted Gainsborough into royal favour at the expense of his rival Sir Joshua Reynolds.

== Bibliography ==
- Asfour, Amal & Williamson, Paul. Gainsborough's Vision. Liverpool University Press, 1999.
- Hamilton, James. Gainsborough: A Portrait. Hachette UK, 2017.
- Levey, Michael. Sir Thomas Lawrence. Yale University Press, 2005.
- Roberts, Jane. George III and Queen Charlotte: Patronage, Collecting and Court Taste. Royal Collection, 2009.
