= Portrait of Benjamin West (Lawrence) =

1810 painting by Thomas Lawrence

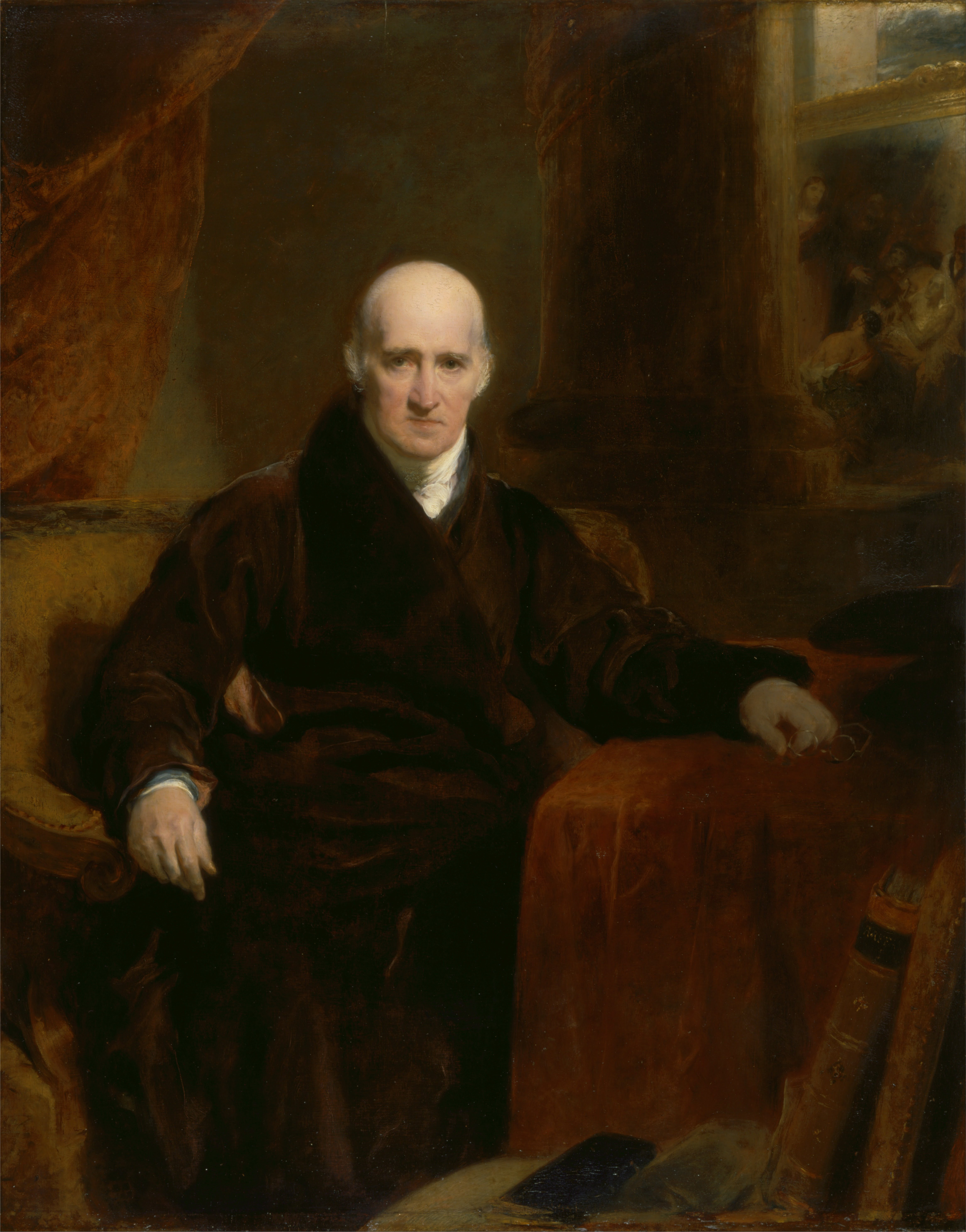
- Artist: Thomas Lawrence
- Year: 1810
- Type: Oil on canvas
- Dimensions: 153.7 cm × 120.7 cm (60.51 in × 47.51 in)
- Location: Yale Center for British Art, New Haven

Portrait of Benjamin West is an 1810 portrait painting by the British artist Thomas Lawrence depicting the Anglo-American painter Benjamin West. Ten years later Lawrence succeeded West, on his death, as the President of the Royal Academy.

== History and description ==
West had made his name on both sides of the Atlantic with his 1770 epic painting The Death of General Wolfe. In 1792 he was elected as President of the Royal Academy in succession to the first Joshua Reynolds. A former child prodigy, Lawrence had become one of Britain's most fashionable portraitists when he painted West, on the cusp of the Regency era. It was exhibited at the Royal Academy's Summer Exhibition of 1811 at Somerset House. It has been described as a "sober, respectful yet searching portrait" of the elder artist.

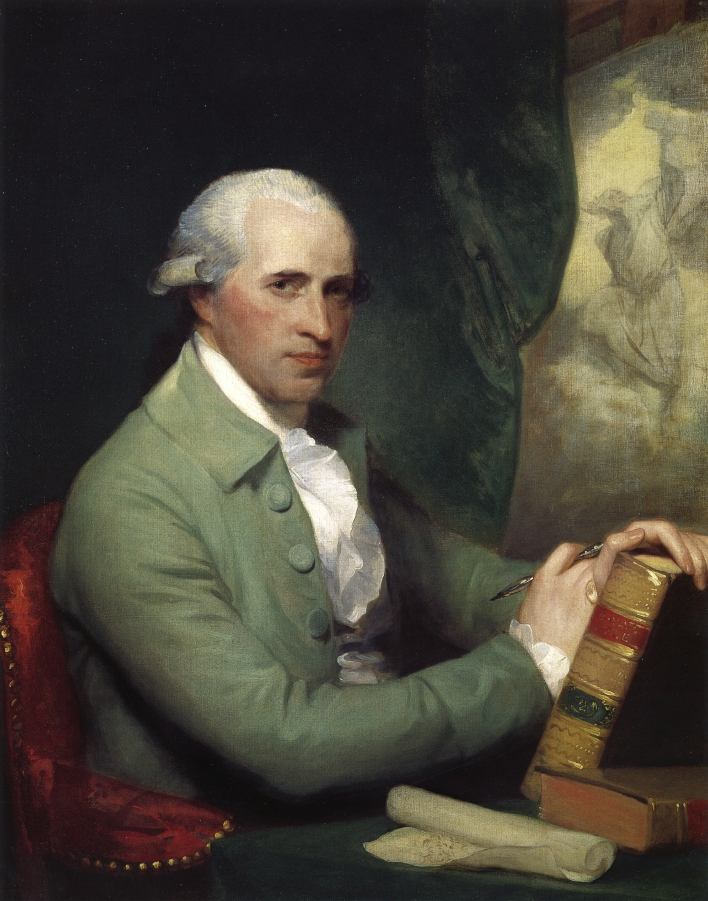
Portrait of Benjamin West by his fellow American Gilbert Stuart, 1785

Today it is in the collection of the Yale Center of British Art in New Haven, Connecticut. Samuel Morse made a copy of the work while visiting Lawrence's studio in London, which is now in the National Academy of Design.

== Bibliography ==
- Levey, Michael. Sir Thomas Lawrence. Yale University Press, 2005.
- McCarthy, Jeremiah William & Thompson, Diana. For America: Paintings from the National Academy of Design. Yale University Press, 2019.
- Roach, Catherine. Pictures-within-Pictures in Nineteenth-Century Britain. Routledge, 2017.
