= Portrait of Sir Brooke Boothby =

Painting by Joseph Wright of Derby

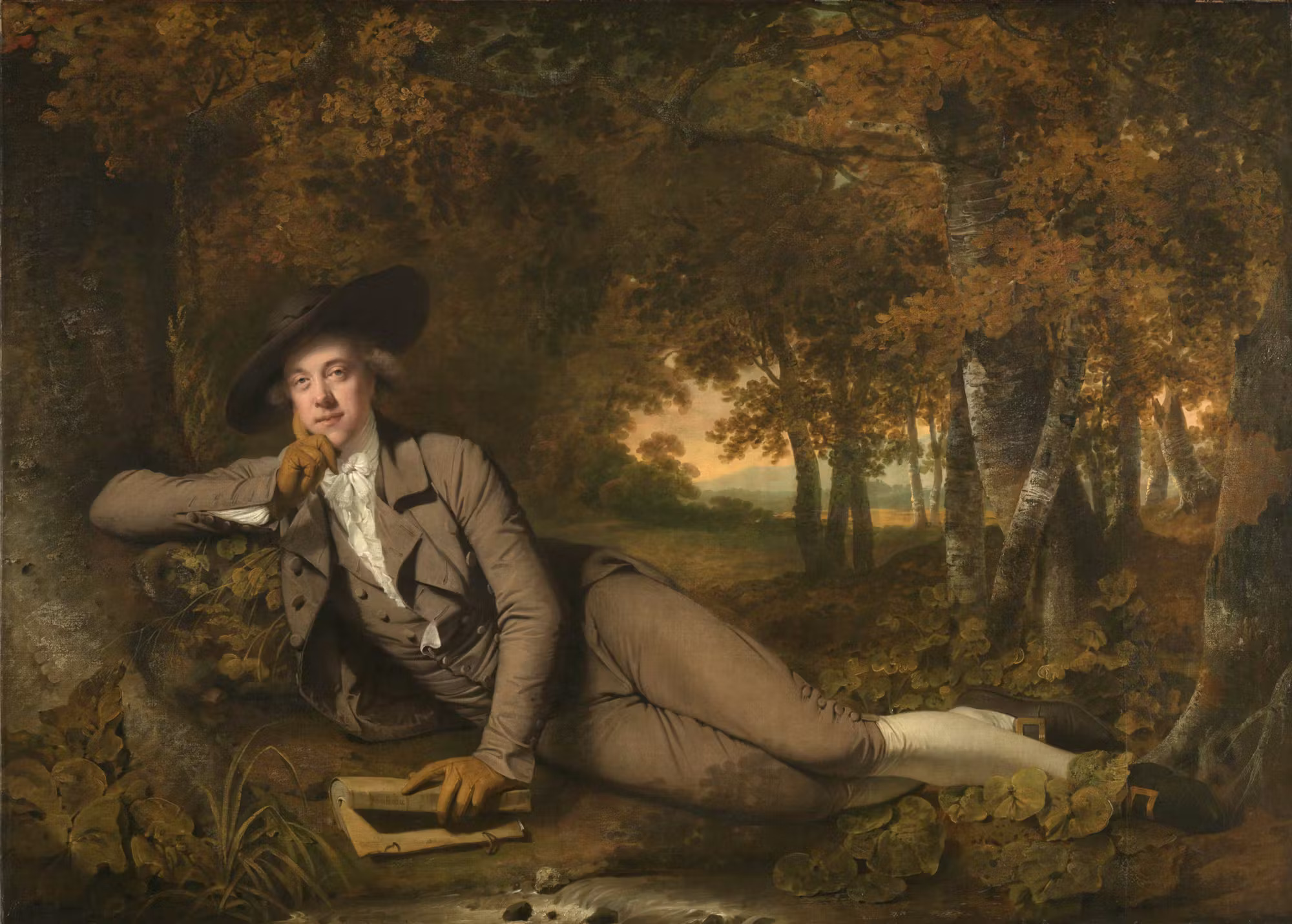
- Artist: Joseph Wright of Derby
- Year: 1781
- Type: Oil on canvas, portrait painting
- Dimensions: 148.6 cm × 207.6 cm (58.5 in × 81.7 in)
- Location: Tate Britain; London

Portrait of Sir Brooke Boothby is 1781 portrait painting by the English painter Joseph Wright of Derby. It depicts the English landowner Sir Brooke Boothby, 6th Baronet. It is unusual in portraiture of the era in being set outdoors and with Boothby shown laying vertically. He is depicted in a wooded glade and holding a book by Jean-Jacques Rousseau, the Swiss writer he was a huge admirer of.

It was displayed at the Royal Academy's Summer Exhibition of 1781 at Somerset House. Today the painting is in the collection of Tate Britain in Pimlico having been acquired in 1925.

== Bibliography ==
- Brewer, John. The Pleasures of the Imagination: English Culture in the Eighteenth Century. Routledge, 2013.
- Burke, Peter. Eyewitnessing: The Uses of Images as Historical Evidence. Reaktion Books, 2006.
- Zonneveld, Sjaak. Sir Brooke Boothby: Rousseau's Roving Baronet Friend. De Nieuwe Haagsche, 2003.
