= Thaïs (painting) =

Painting by Joshua Reynolds

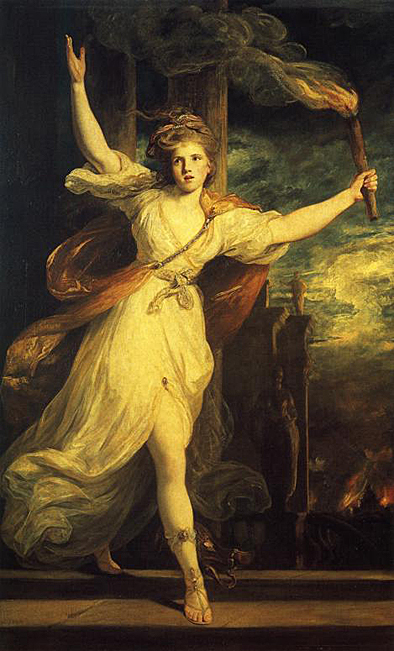
- Artist: Joshua Reynolds
- Year: 1781
- Medium: Oil on canvas
- Location: Waddesdon Manor

Thaïs is a portrait by Sir Joshua Reynolds of the English courtesan Emily Warren in the guise of the hetaera Thaïs, mistress of Alexander the Great. It is in oil on canvas and measures 229 x 145 cm. She holds a burning torch and with the other hand exhorts Alexander and his followers to burn down Persepolis. Reynolds exhibited it at the Royal Academy in London in 1781. It is now at Waddesdon Manor.

The painting was published as a print engraved by Francesco Bartolozzi in 1792.

== History of creation ==
In his work, Reynolds combined a portrait, historical painting and social overtones. The image is inspired by John Dryden's poem Alexander's Feast ("Thaïs led the Way / To light him to his Prey / And, like another Helen, fir'd another Troy'"), which describes an episode of Alexander's invasion of the Persian Empire. Hetera Thaïs, who accompanied the Macedonian army, at a victorious feast after the capture of the Achaemenid capital of Persepolis, calls for burning the city, thus taking revenge on the Persians for the ruin of Greek cities.

The model was the courtesan Emily, mistress of Charles Francis Greville. Some researchers have suggested that Amy Lyon, also Greville's mistress and future Lady Hamilton, posed for the picture. However, it is more likely that Emily Bertie Pott, who also called herself Emily Warren, is portrayed as Thaïs, and a likely portrait of her by Romney is exhibited at the Metropolitan Museum of Art (Inv. No. 58.102.2).

The painting was exhibited at the Royal Academy Exhibition of 1781 and provoked an ironic comment from one of the viewers, who claimed that the artist, having not received payment for his work from Emily, depicted her setting fire to the Temple of Chastity, indicating her status. Some of Reynolds's acquaintances denied this story, however, as Phillippa Plock, former curator at Waddesdon Manor, notes, it is quite possible that the artist wanted the picture to be associated with women like Emily, when the very name of the famous hetaera meant a courtesan.
