= Portrait of Benjamin West (Stuart, Tate Britain) =

Painting by Gilbert Stuart

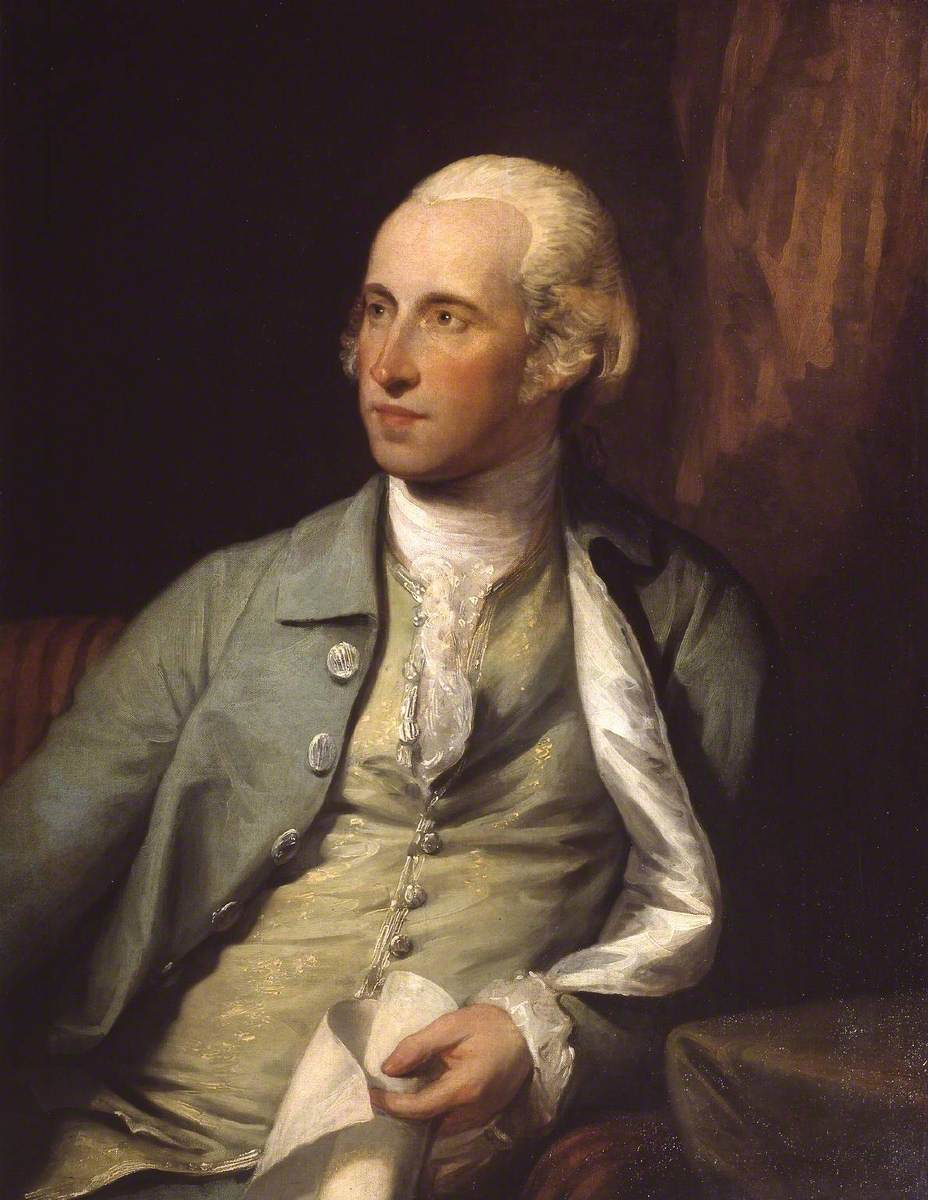
- Artist: Gilbert Stuart
- Year: 1781
- Type: Oil on canvas, portrait painting
- Dimensions: 69.8 cm × 88.5 cm (27.5 in × 34.8 in)
- Location: Tate Britain, London

Portrait of Benjamin West is a 1781 portrait painting by the American artist Gilbert Stuart depicting his fellow painter Benjamin West. He is portrayed with sharply drawn features and a faraway look in his eyes, and dressed as a fashionable gentleman of the era.

The Pennsylvania-born West had settled in Britain during the 1760s and became well-known for his Neoclassical history paintings, receiving frequent royal commissions from George III. Stuart had travelled to London later and from 1777 was a pupil of his, one of a number of American artists to study under West. West was later elected as the second President of the Royal Academy in succession to Joshua Reynolds while Stuart returned to become a leading portraitist in the United States.

The painting was displayed at the Royal Academy Exhibition of 1781 held at Somerset House in London, where it attracted his first public review where a critic said it "was an excellent portrait of Mr. West, indeed I do not know a better one in the room". Today it is in the collection of the Tate Britain, having been given to the nation in 1853. Stuart also produced a later, different Portrait of Benjamin West, which is now in the National Portrait Gallery.

== Bibliography ==
- Barratt, Carrie Rebora & Miles, Ellen G. Gilbert Stuart. Metropolitan Museum of Art, 2004.
