= 1782 in art =

Events from the year 1782 in art.

== Events ==
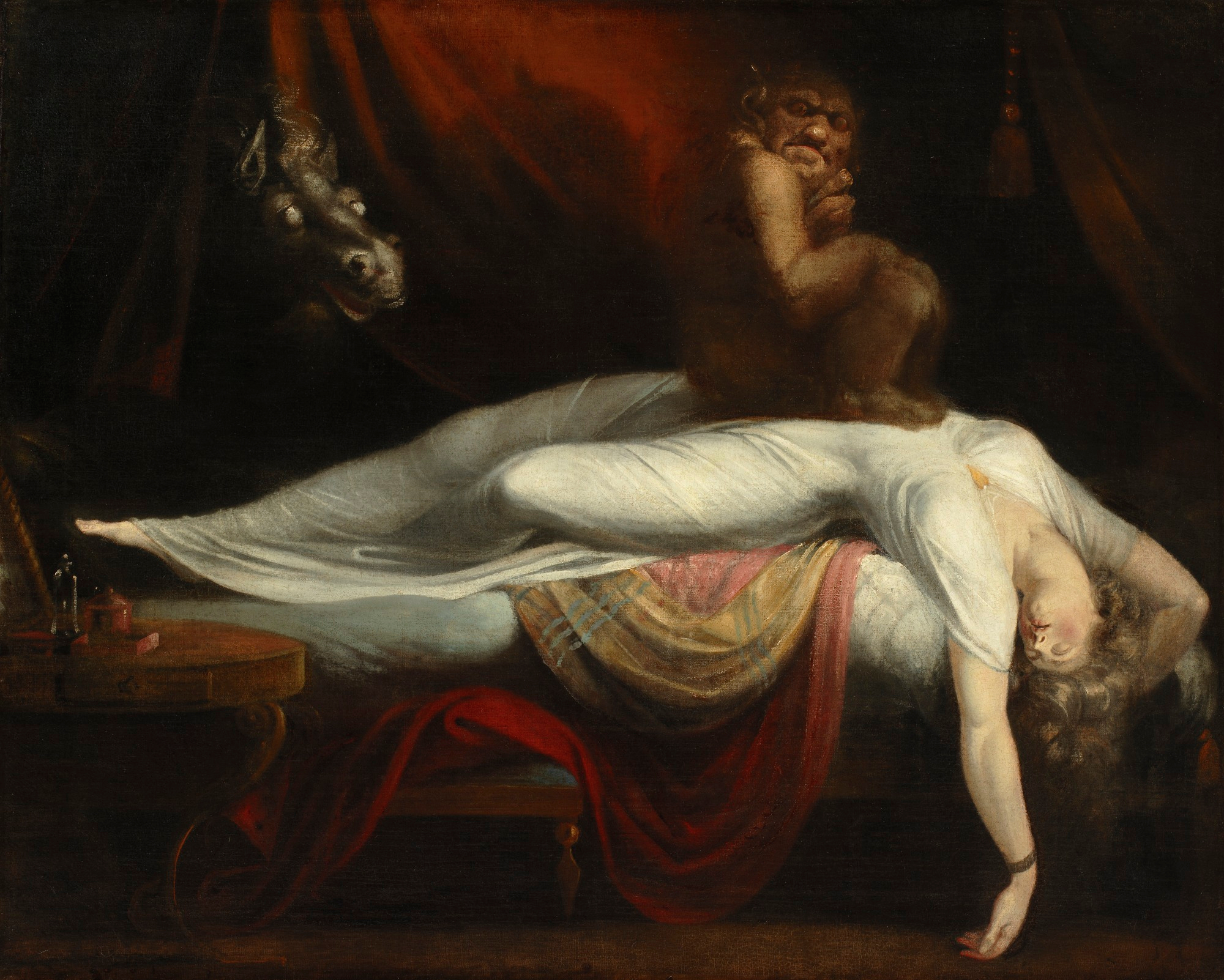
The Nightmare (1781) by Henry Fuseli is shown at the Royal Academy of London

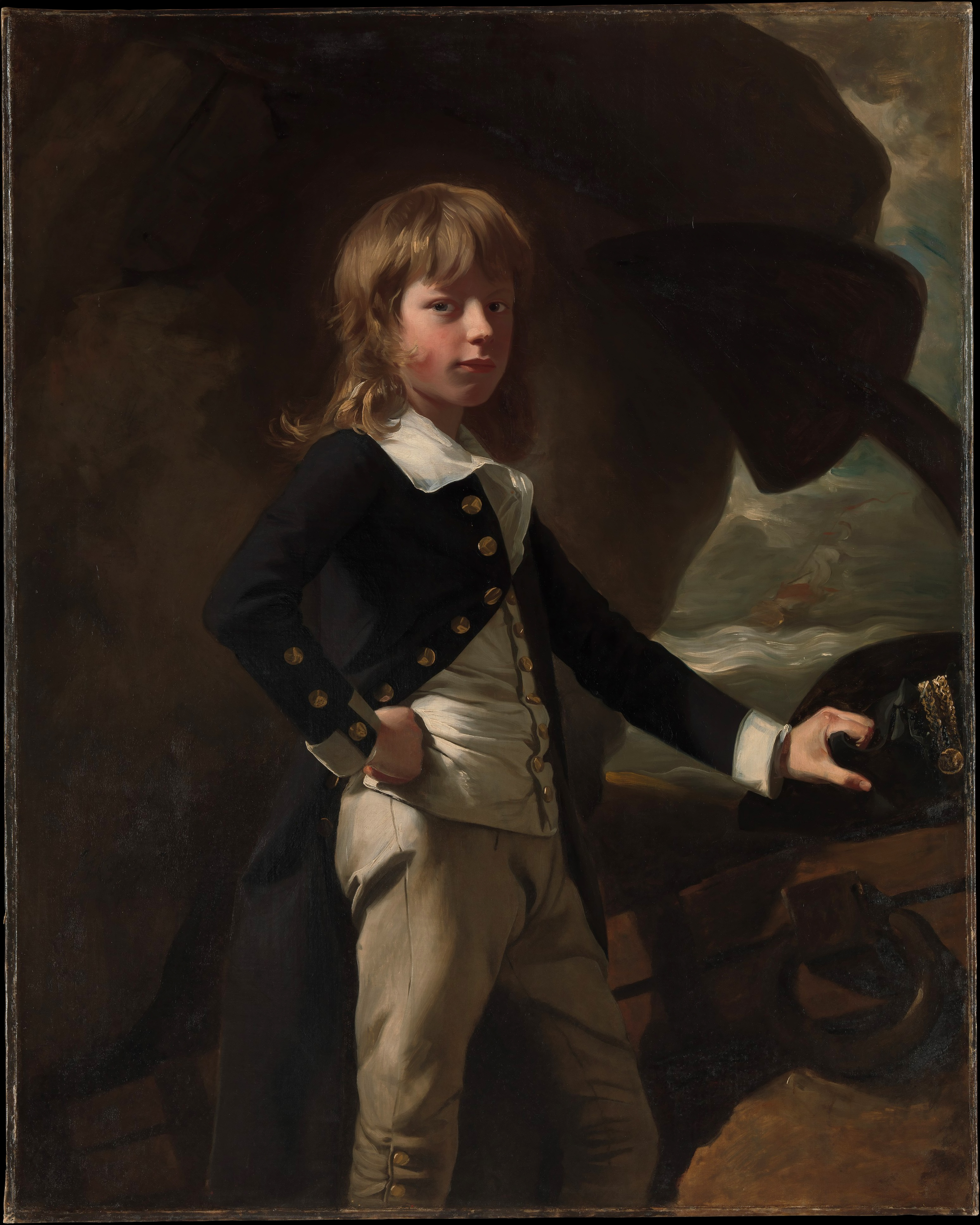
John Singleton Copley – Midshipman Augustus Brine

- 29 April – The Royal Academy Exhibition of 1782 opens at Somerset House in London, UK.
- Spring – George Romney first paints Emma Hart.
- The Nightmare (1781) by Henry Fuseli is shown at the Royal Academy of London.

== Works ==
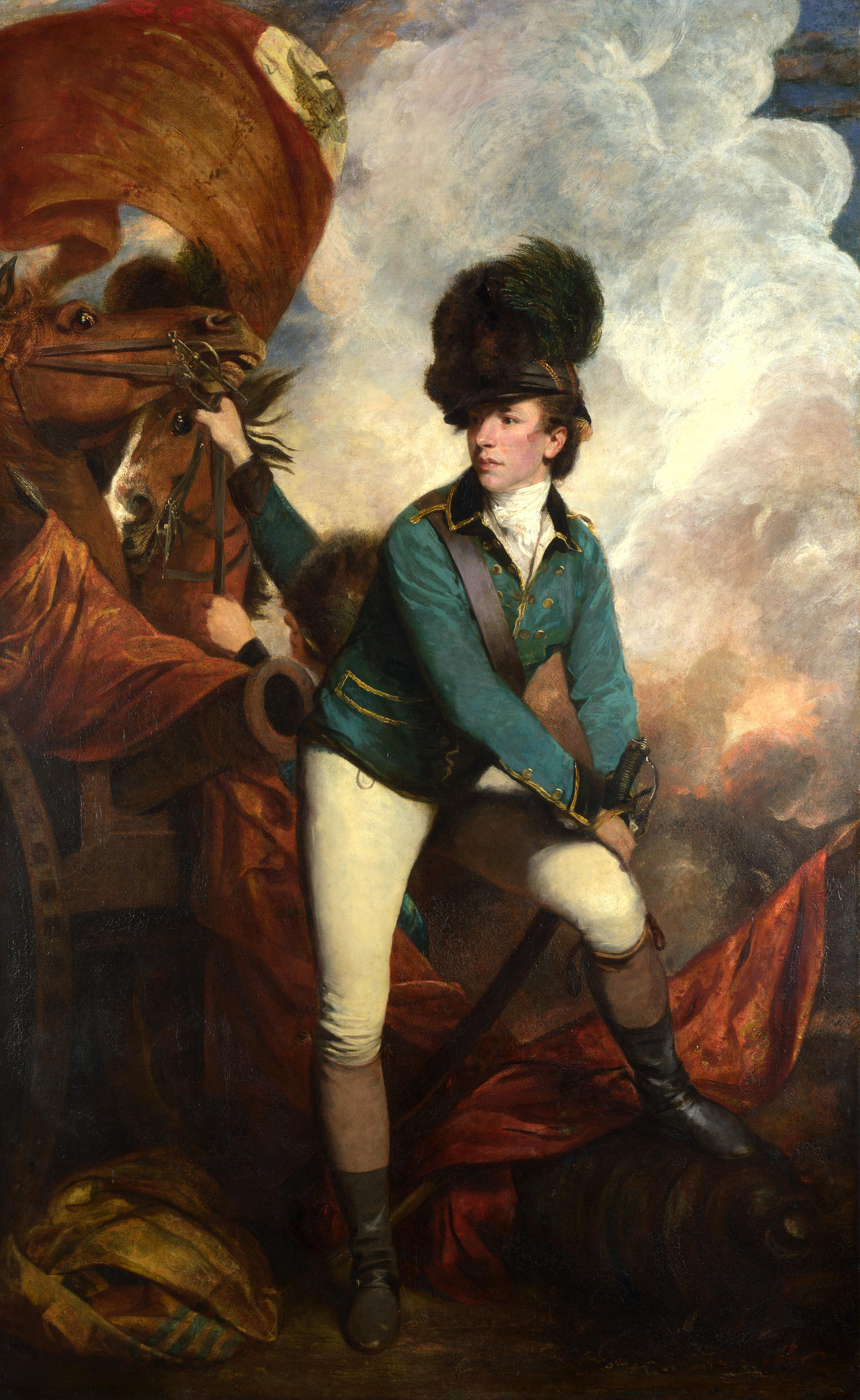
Portrait of Banastre Tarleton by Joshua Reynolds.

- John Singleton Copley – The Tribute Money
- Étienne Maurice Falconet – Bronze Horseman (Saint Petersburg)
- Thomas Gainsborough
  - George, Prince of Wales
  - Girl with Pigs
  - John Hayes St Leger
  - Master Nicholls (The Pink Boy)
  - Portrait of Giovanna Baccelli
  - Wooded Landscape with Cattle by a Pool
- Thomas Jones – House in Naples and similar oil sketches
- Angelica Kauffman – Allegory of poetry and music
- Joseph Lange – Portrait of his sister-in-law Constanze Mozart
- Louise Élisabeth Vigée Le Brun – Self-Portrait in a Straw Hat
- Charles Willson Peale – John Eager Howard in Uniform
- Jean-Baptiste Regnault – Andromeda's Return
- Joshua Reynolds
  - Portrait of William Beckford
  - Captain George K. H. Coussmaker
  - The Infant Academy
  - Portrait of Banastre Tarleton
- George Romney – Two paintings of Emma Hart as Circe
- Gilbert Stuart – The Skater
- Johann Zoffany – Charles Towneley in his Sculpture Gallery

== Births ==
- February 9 – William Havell, English landscape painter, part of the Havell family (died 1857)
- February 17 – Thomas Baxter, English porcelain painter (died 1821)
- March 24 – Orest Kiprensky, Russian portraitist in the Age of Romanticism (died 1836)
- May 16 – John Sell Cotman – English artist of the Norwich school especially watercolours (died 1842)
- May 25 – Vigilius Eriksen, Danish painter and royal portraitist (born 1722)
- October 13 – Joseph Nigg, Austrian painter, with painting on porcelain a specialty (died 1863)
- December 3 – Henry William Pickersgill, English painter specialising in portraits (died 1875)
- date unknown
  - Sir William Allan, Scottish historical painter (died 1850)
  - Frédéric Théodore Faber, Belgian landscape and genre painter (died 1844)
  - Kazimierz Jelski, Polish architect and sculptor (died 1867)
  - Yakov Kolokolnikov-Voronin, Russian portraitist and icon-painter (died 1845)
  - Frederick Nash, English painter and draughtsman (died 1856)
  - William Sadler, Irish landscape painter (died 1839)
  - Johann Baptist Dallinger von Dalling, Austrian painter (died 1868)
  - Alexander Varnek, Russian portrait painter (died 1843)
- approximate date – John Edward Carew, Irish sculptor (died 1868)

== Deaths ==
- January 11 – Joseph Johann Kauffmann, Austrian painter of portraits, church decorations, and castle depictions (born 1707)
- March 22 – Joachim Martin Falbe, German portrait painter (born 1709)
- April 16 – Giuseppe Vasi, Italian painter (born 1710)
- May 6 – Johann Caspar Füssli, Swiss portrait painter (born 1706)
- May 15 – Richard Wilson, Welsh landscape painter (born 1714)
- June 10 – Paulus Constantijn la Fargue, Dutch painter, etcher and draftsman (born 1729)
- June 26 – Antonio Visentini, Italian architect, painter and engraver (born 1688)
- July 17 – Peter Cramer, Danish book illustrator, decorative and theatrical painter (born 1726)
- August 19 – Francesco de Mura, Italian painter of portraits and frescoes (born 1696)
- December 13 – Christian Friedrich Boetius, German engraver (born 1706)
- December 23 – Claude Drevet, French portrait engraver (born 1705)
- date unknown – Maria Maddalena Baldacci, Italian painter born in Florence (born 1718)
