= Self-Portrait (Opie) =

Painting by John Opie

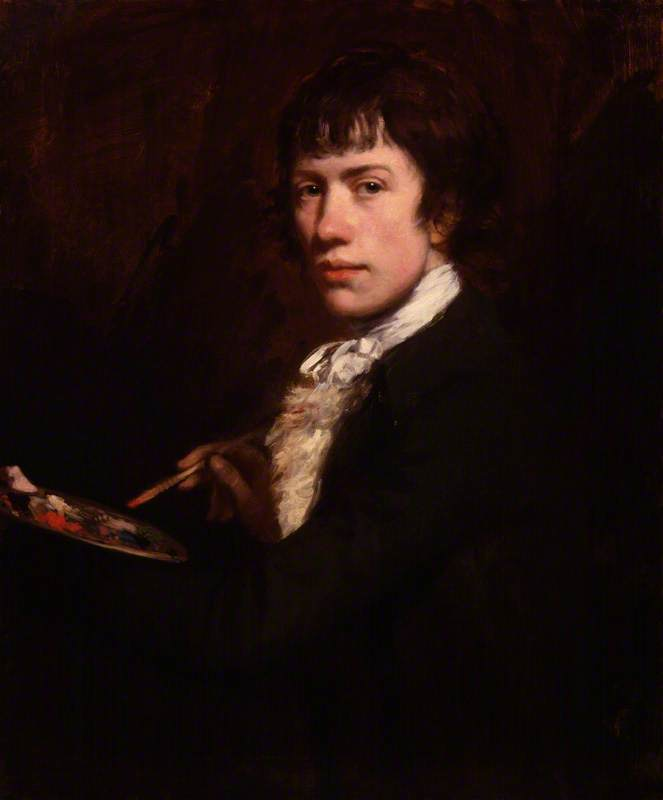
- Artist: John Opie
- Year: 1785
- Type: Oil on canvas, portrait
- Dimensions: 74.3 cm × 62.2 cm (29.3 in × 24.5 in)
- Location: National Portrait Gallery; London

Self-Portrait is an oil on canvas portrait painting by the British artist John Opie, from 1785. A self-portrait, it depicts the artist at the age of around 24 when he had established himself as a major figure. Opie had exploded onto the London scene in 1781 and enjoyed a spectator success at the Royal Academy Exhibition of 1782. He became known as the "Cornish Wonder", because he was supposedly self-taught. His work drew heavily on the tradition of realism and used striking chiaroscuro contrasts. Others have noticed the influence that the established painter Richard Wilson had in coaching and managing his early style. Opie is shown with a paintbrush and palette.

The painting is now in the collection of the National Portrait Gallery in London, having been purchased in 1958.

== Bibliography ==
- Crane, David. Romantics & Revolutionaries: Regency Portraits from the National Portrait Gallery London. National Portrait Gallery, 2002.
- Holmes, Richard. The Romantic Poets and Their Circle. National Portrait Gallery, 2005.
- McIntyre, Ian. Joshua Reynolds: The Life and Times of the First President of the Royal Academy. Allen Lane, 2003.
- Walker, Richard John Boileau. Regency Portraits, Volume 1. National Portrait Gallery, 1985.
