= Portrait of Banastre Tarleton =

Painting by Joshua Reynolds

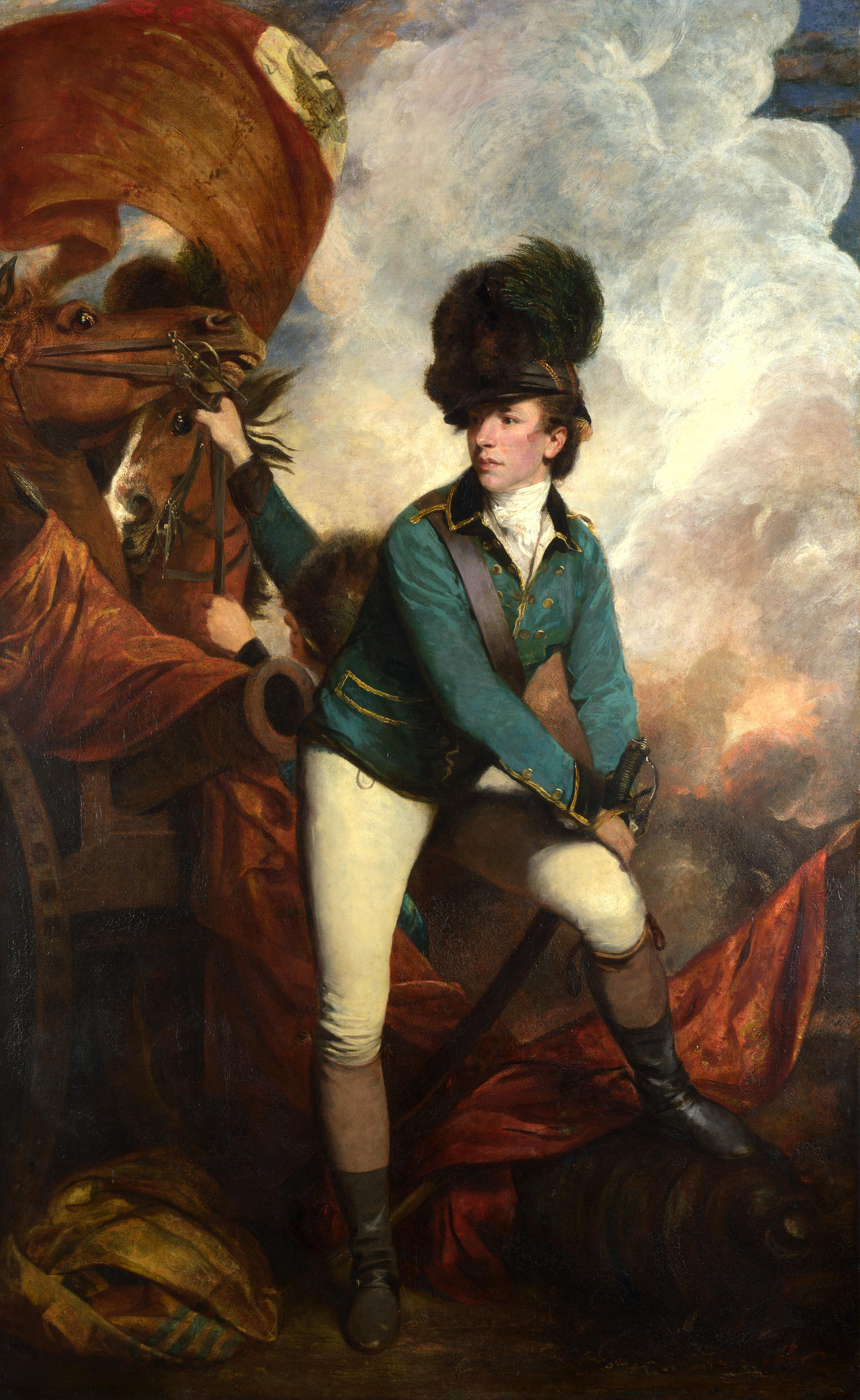
- Artist: Joshua Reynolds
- Year: 1782
- Medium: Oil on canvas
- Dimensions: 236 cm × 145 cm (93 in × 57 in)
- Location: National Gallery, London

Portrait of Banastre Tarleton is a 1782 portrait painting by the English artist Sir Joshua Reynolds. It depicts the British army officer Banastre Tarleton against a background scene of battle, referring to his recent service in the American War of Independence. Tarleton is shown in the uniform of the British Legion, a unit of American Loyalist cavalry. Reynolds, President of the Royal Academy, was of the country's leading portraitists.

It was exhibited at the Royal Academy's Summer Exhibition of 1782. Today it is in the collection of the National Gallery in London.

== Bibliography ==
- Ferling, John E. Almost a Miracle: The American Victory in the War of Independence. Oxford University Press, 2009.
- Gent, Alexandra & Morrison, Rachel. Joshua Reynolds in the National Gallery and the Wallace Collection. National Gallery Company, 2015.
- Myrone, Martin. Bodybuilding: Reforming Masculinities in British Art 1750-1810. Yale University Press, 2005.
