= Wooded Landscape with Cattle by a Pool =

Painting by Thomas Gainsborough

- Artist: Thomas Gainsborough
- Year: 1782
- Type: Oil on canvas, landscape painting
- Dimensions: 120.4 cm × 147.6 cm (47.4 in × 58.1 in)
- Location: Gainsborough's House, Suffolk

Wooded Landscape with Cattle by a Pool is a 1782 oil painting by the British artist Thomas Gainsborough. It features a view of a woodland clearing at sunset with a cottage and cattle. It is characteristic of his late career landscapes. It has been suggested it might have been an observational comment on the agricultural revolution or simply a personal escape from his more profitable work of portrait painting.

The painting was displayed at the Royal Academy Exhibition of 1782 held at Somerset House in London. Today it part of the collection of Gainsborough's House, his historic residence in his native Sudbury having been acquired in 1988.

== Bibliography ==
- Jones, Rica. Thomas Gainsborough. Harry N. Abrams, 2009.
- Roe, Sonia. Oil Paintings in Public Ownership in Suffolk. Public Catalogue Foundation, 2005.
