= The Skater =

1782 painting by Gilbert Stuart

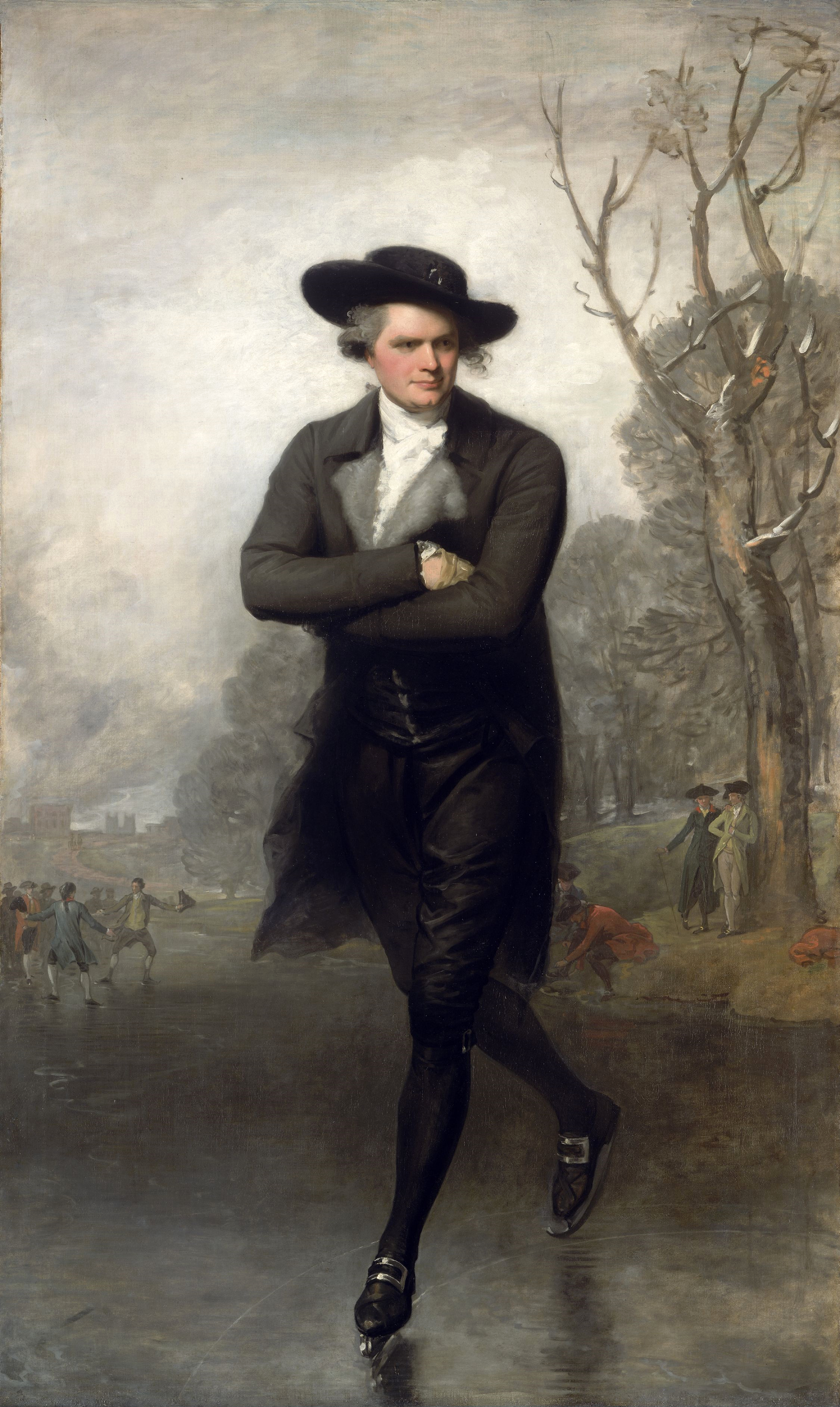
- Artist: Gilbert Stuart
- Year: 1782
- Medium: Oil on canvas
- Dimensions: 245.5 cm × 147.4 cm (96.7 in × 58.0 in)
- Location: National Gallery of Art, Washington D.C.
- Accession: 1950.18.1

The Skater is a 1782 oil on canvas portrait of British lawyer and politician Sir William Grant by the American artist Gilbert Stuart. Painted while Stuart was living in London, it was the work that first brought the artist broad recognition.

== Background ==
In 1775 Stuart left his home in the United States for London, and by 1777 he was apprenticed there to Benjamin West. By 1781 Stuart's progress was such that West desired to sit for a portrait by the younger painter, and the resulting painting was favorably received at that year's Royal Academy Exhibition of 1781.

Later in 1781 Stuart was approached by Sir William Grant, a well-placed young Scotsman from Congalton in East Lothian, not far from Edinburgh, who wished to commission a full-length portrait. Stuart had not yet successfully completed a figure in full-length format—he had, in fact, been loath to accept at least two such previous commissions, and was said to have been incapable of painting a figure "beneath the fifth button". Encouraged by the recent reception of his work at the Royal Academy, he agreed to accept the commission from Grant.

When he arrived to begin sitting for the portrait, Grant remarked that "on account of the excessive coldness of the weather ... the day was better suited for skating than sitting for one's portrait". Presently artist and patron left for the Serpentine in Hyde Park, where the two men took to the ice, and Grant engaged in a series of skating maneuvers that attracted an admiring crowd. When the ice beneath them began to crack, Stuart instructed Grant to take hold of his coattails, and led him safely to shore.

Upon their return to the studio Stuart started to paint Grant's head directly—he never drew with a pencil—then stopped and suggested a composition inspired by their venture on the ice. Grant consented, and Stuart subsequently rendered the figure from memory.

== Description ==
With his arms crossed and his head slightly lowered as he skates from right to left, Grant dominates the canvas. The dramatic impression is enhanced by a low point of view, much in the fashion of Baroque portraiture in the Grand Manner. But for his folded arms, Grant's pose derives from the Apollo Belvedere, a cast of which was present in West's studio. The black tones of a full-skirted coat, elegant smallclothes and shoes are relieved by a white cravat and cuff, a gray fur lapel, a glimpse of tan glove, and silver buckles on the hat, breeches, and shoes; the stylishly tilted hat belonged to the artist. Behind Grant is a winter landscape of restrained tones composed of distant skaters, trees, and a far-off London skyline that includes Westminster Abbey. Grant's figure divides the canvas into contrasting halves: to the right the coat's silhouette undulates gently, and a large bare tree anchors the composition, while the left side, opening onto the gestures of skaters in motion, is activated by the shape of his protruding elbow and the jagged contour of coat. Beyond the large tree the recession of the distant treeline creates a movement from right to left which is echoed by the disposition of the secondary figures. The overall handling evidences a lightness of touch and a success in integrating figure and landscape that suggests the open-air portraits of Thomas Gainsborough.

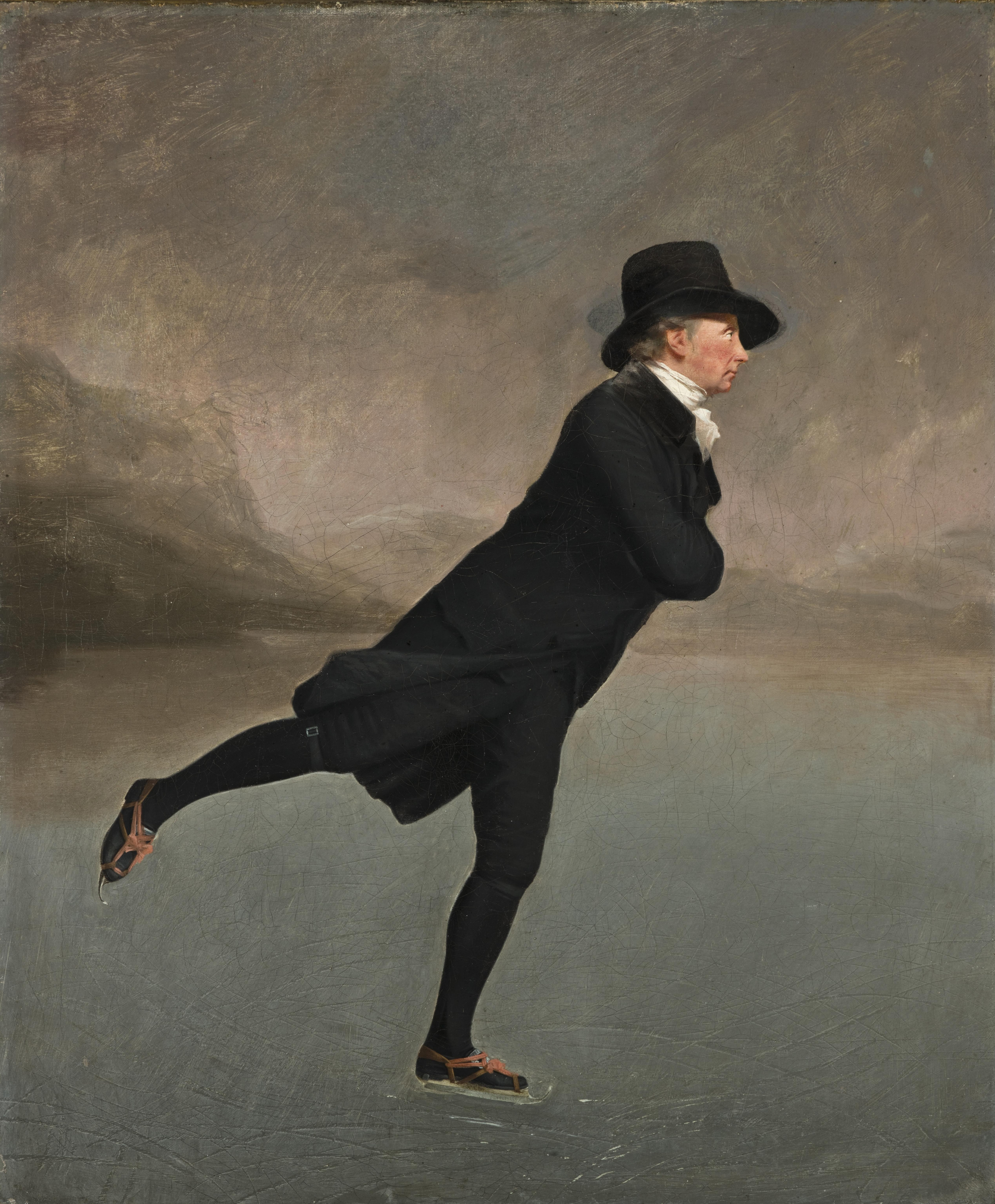
The Skating Minister by Henry Raeburn may have been inspired by Stuart's painting.

== Reception ==
At the Royal Academy Exhibition of 1782 the painting was immediately recognized for its originality. Connoisseur John Collum wrote "One would have thought that almost every attitude of a single figure had long been exhausted in this land of portrait painting, but one is now exhibited which I recollect not before—it is that of skating". The Duke of Rutland supposedly went directly from the exhibition to meet with Joshua Reynolds, beseeching him to see the painting. On the strength of The Skater Stuart's reputation gained parity with those of Gainsborough and Reynolds, and prominent commissions followed. Stuart's apprenticeship with West ended, and he moved his studio from a room in the senior artist's house to an independent space on Newman Street. Stuart later said that he had been "suddenly lifted into fame by a single picture."

It had appeared again in an exhibition at the Royal Academy in 1878. The painting passed by descent in the sitter's family until 1950, when it was sold to the National Gallery of Art, Washington.

The Skater may have influenced Henry Raeburn's later painting, The Skating Minister, considered a masterpiece of Scottish art.
