= Frederick Nash (painter) =

English painter and draughtsman

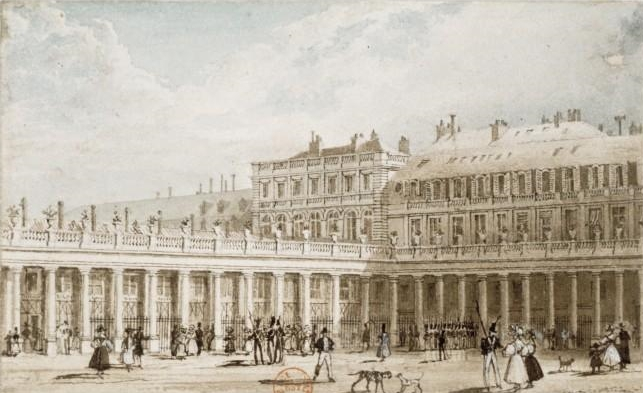
Cour d'honneur du Palais Royal, Paris by Frederick Nash, Bibliothèque nationale de France, 1829

Frederick Nash (1782–1856) was an English painter and draughtsman.

Frederick Nash was born in Lambeth. He initially studied architectural drawing under Thomas Malton, then later enrolled at the Royal Academy of Arts. Between 1801 and 1809 Nash worked with the antiquarians John Britton and Edward Wedlake Brayley. In 1810, he became a member of Society of Painters in Watercolours, an organization whose members had seceded from the Royal Academy over complaints that their work was not being recognized. Nash primarily painted landscapes, and made sketching trips to Calais, Caen, the Moselle river and the Rhine. In 1834 he moved to Brighton where he continued working until his death in 1856.

== External links and references ==
- Alice Lee., a painting, engraved by Lumb Stocks, for the Forget Me Not annual, 1839, with illustrative verse by Letitia Elizabeth Landon.
