= Portrait of Giovanna Baccelli =

Painting by Thomas Gainsborough

- Artist: Thomas Gainsborough
- Year: 1782
- Type: Oil on canvas, portrait painting
- Dimensions: 226.7 cm × 148.6 cm (89.3 in × 58.5 in)
- Location: Tate Britain, London

Portrait of Giovanna Baccelli is an oil on canvas portrait painting by the British artist Thomas Gainsborough, from 1782. It portrays the Italian ballet dancer Giovanna Baccelli. Baccelli was the principal ballerina at King's Theatre in the Haymarket. She was also the mistress of the Duke of Dorset, who commissioned the painting. Due to their relationship and her profession of dancing on stage, the work was considered to be the pushing at the edge of decorum. The painting was displayed at the Royal Academy Exhibition of 1782 at Somerset House in London. Today it is in the collection of the Tate Britain in Pimlico, having been acquired in 1985.

== Bibliography ==
- Barratt, Carrie Rebora & Miles, Ellen G. Gilbert Stuart. Metropolitan Museum of Art, 2004.
- Hamilton, James. Gainsborough: A Portrait. Hachette UK, 2017.
- Postle, Martin. Thomas Gainsborough. Tate, 2002.
