= Royal Academy Exhibition of 1782 =

1782 art exhibition in London

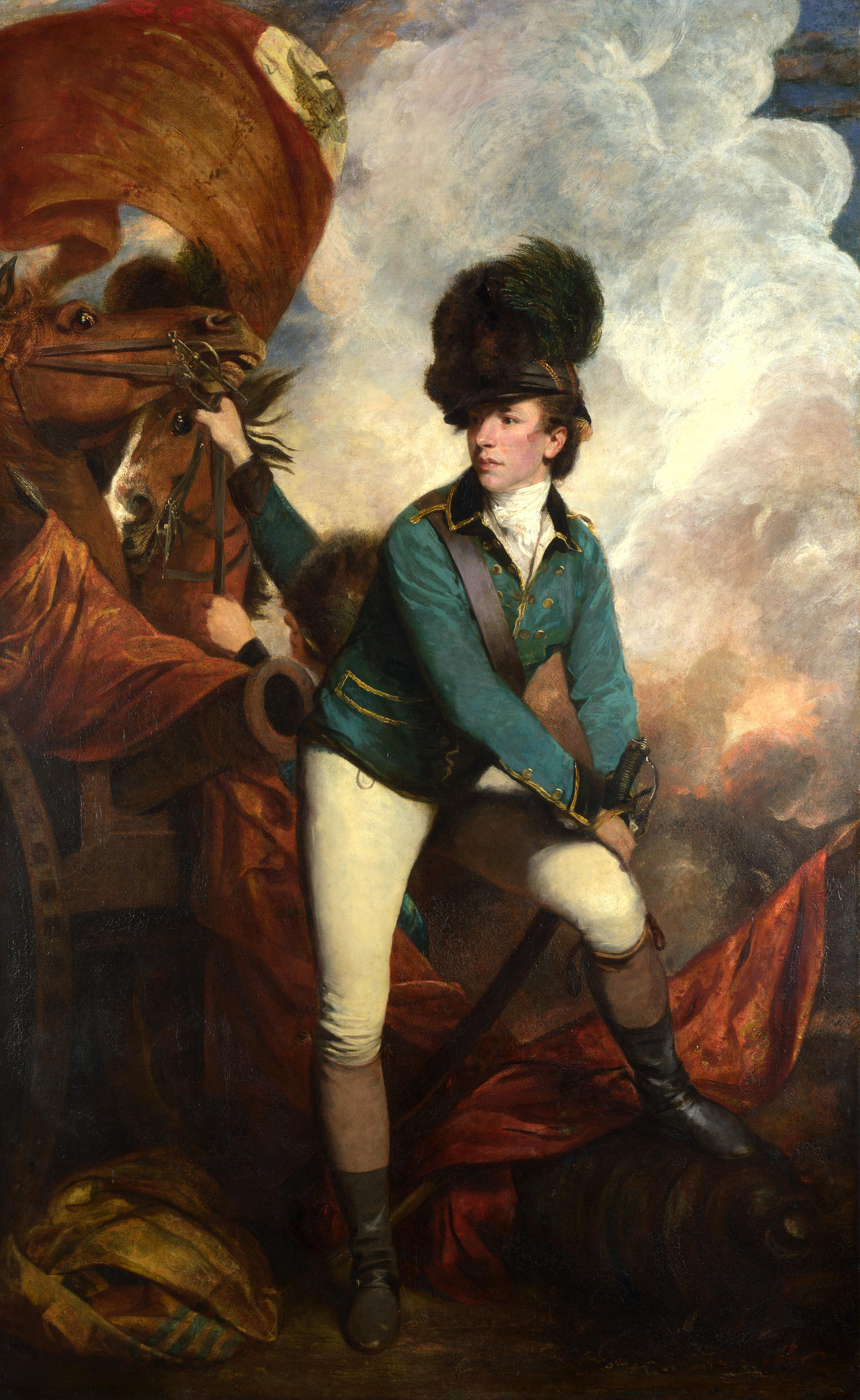
Portrait of Banastre Tarleton by Joshua Reynolds

The Royal Academy Exhibition of 1782 was the fourteenth annual Summer Exhibition of the British Royal Academy of Arts. It took place at Somerset House in London between 29 April and 3 June 1782. It took place during the final year of the American War of Independence with notable actions at the naval Battle of the Saintes and the Great Siege of Gibraltar. The military theme was reflected in the submissions of two of the leading painters of the era Joshua Reynolds and Thomas Gainsborough, both of whom featured portraits of the young cavalry commander Banastre Tarleton.

Both artists made large submissions to the exhibition with Gainsborough sending in eleven paintings and Reynolds, the President of the Royal Academy, displaying fifteen. Despite their ongoing rivalry, Reynolds purchased one the paintings Gainsborough displayed the genre work Girl with Pigs. Aside from Tarleton, both men also produced paintings of the actress Mary Robinson. Gainsborough withdrew his shortly before the exhibition, possibly because of her reputation for having a recent affair with the heir to the throne George, Prince of Wales. Gainsborough had also produced a full-length portrait of George, now at Waddesdon Manor.

The Pennsylvania-born artist Benjamin West, best known for his history paintings, produced a portrait of the king's young son Prince Octavius. His fellow American Gilbert Stuart exhibited The Skater'. John Opie, a young artist from Cornwall, made his debut at the Academy where his pictures were acclaimed. He was acclaimed as the "Cornish wonder", partly due to the mistaken belief that he was self-taught. Angelica Kauffman, one of the two females founders of the Academy, featured a work entitled Modesty. Her fellow Swiss artist Henry Fuseli displayed the Gothic The Nightmare. Maria Cosway enjoyed a great success with her portrait of the Duchess of Devonshire in the role of Cynthia from Edmund Spenser's The Fairie Queene.

== Gallery ==
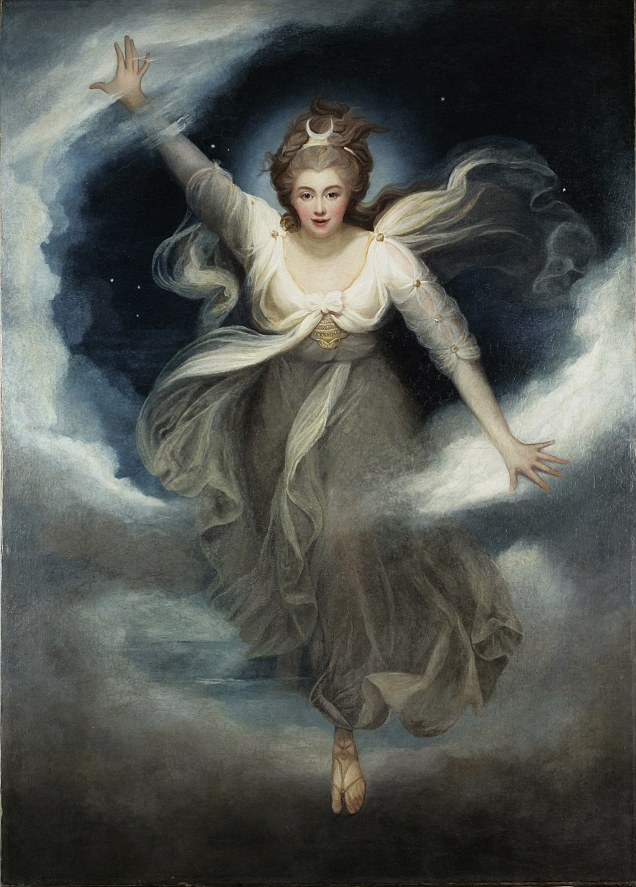
Duchess of Devonshire as Cynthia by Maria Cosway

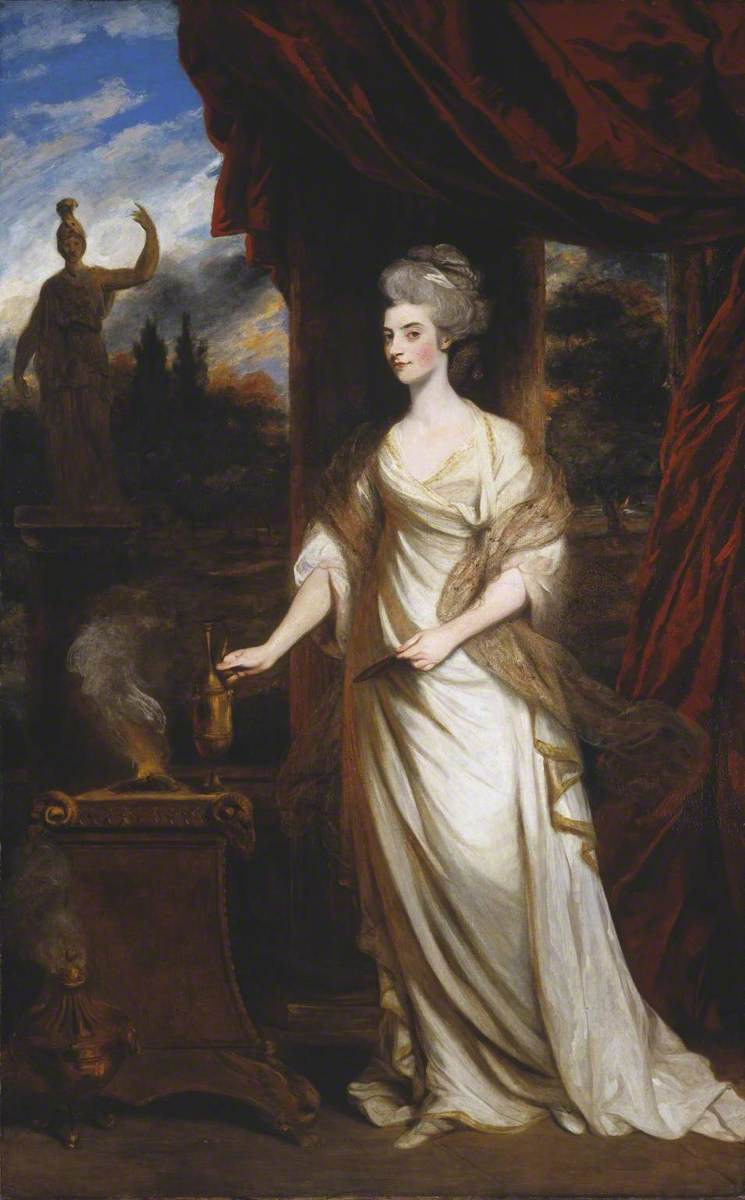
Portrait of Lady Talbot by Joshua Reynolds

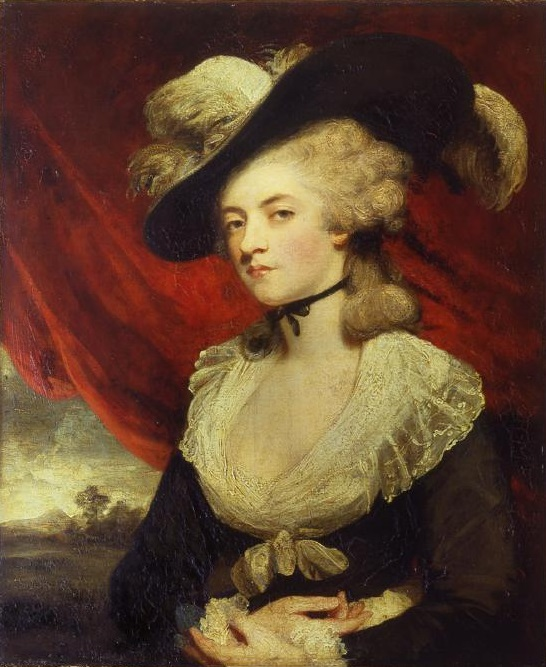
Portrait of Mary Robinson by Joshua Reynolds

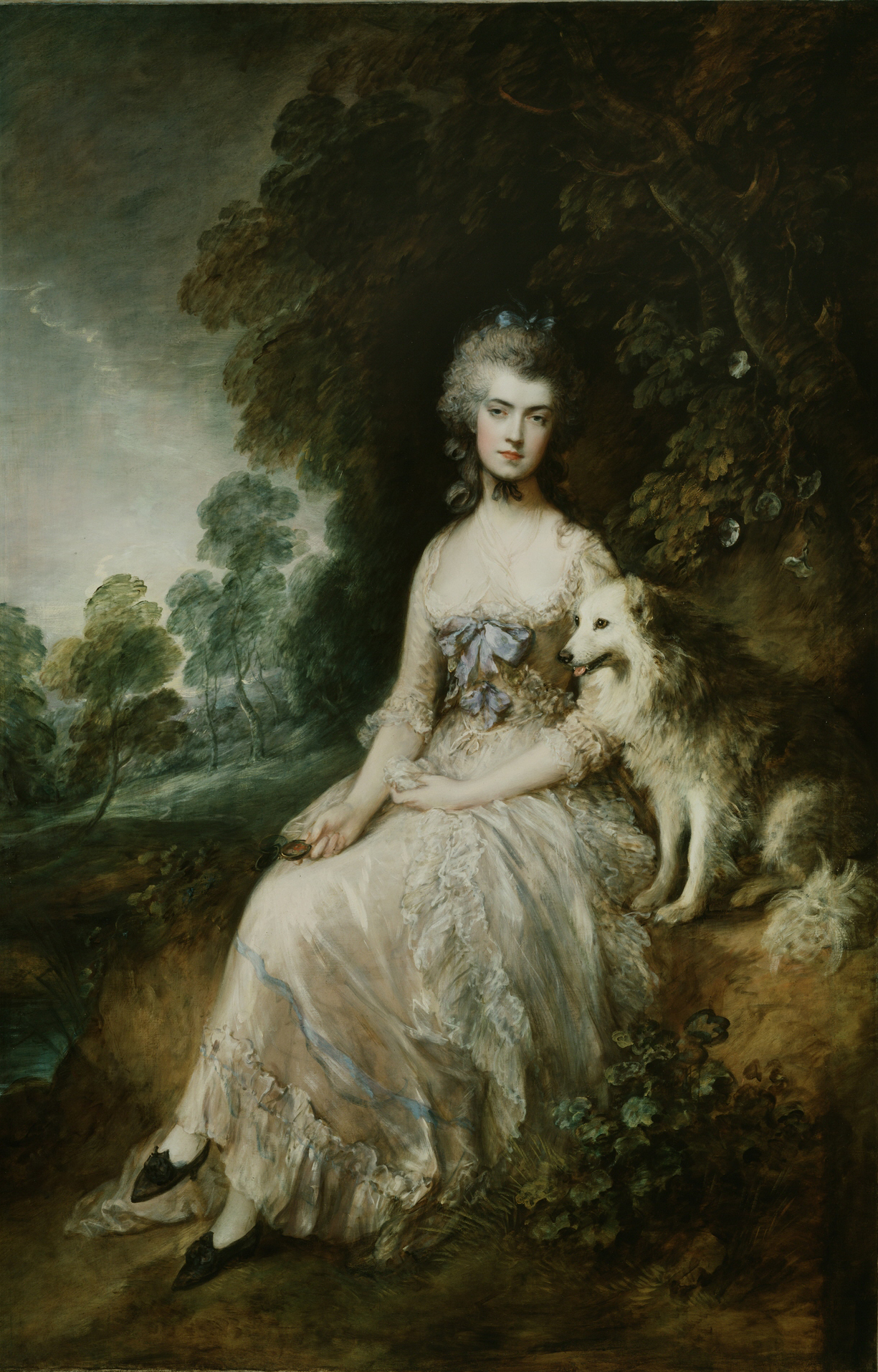
Portrait of Mary Robinson by Thomas Gainsborough

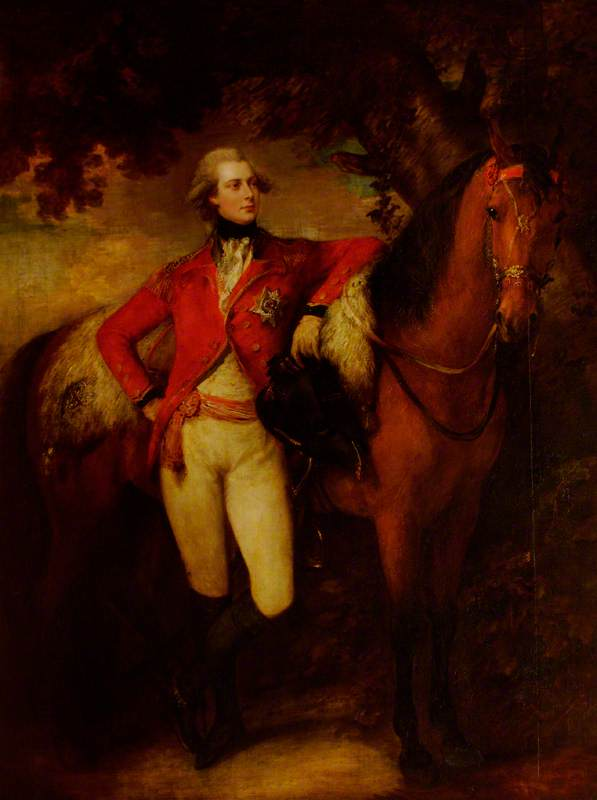
Portrait of George, Prince of Wales by Thomas Gainsborough

Portrait of Giovanna Baccelli by Thomas Gainsborough

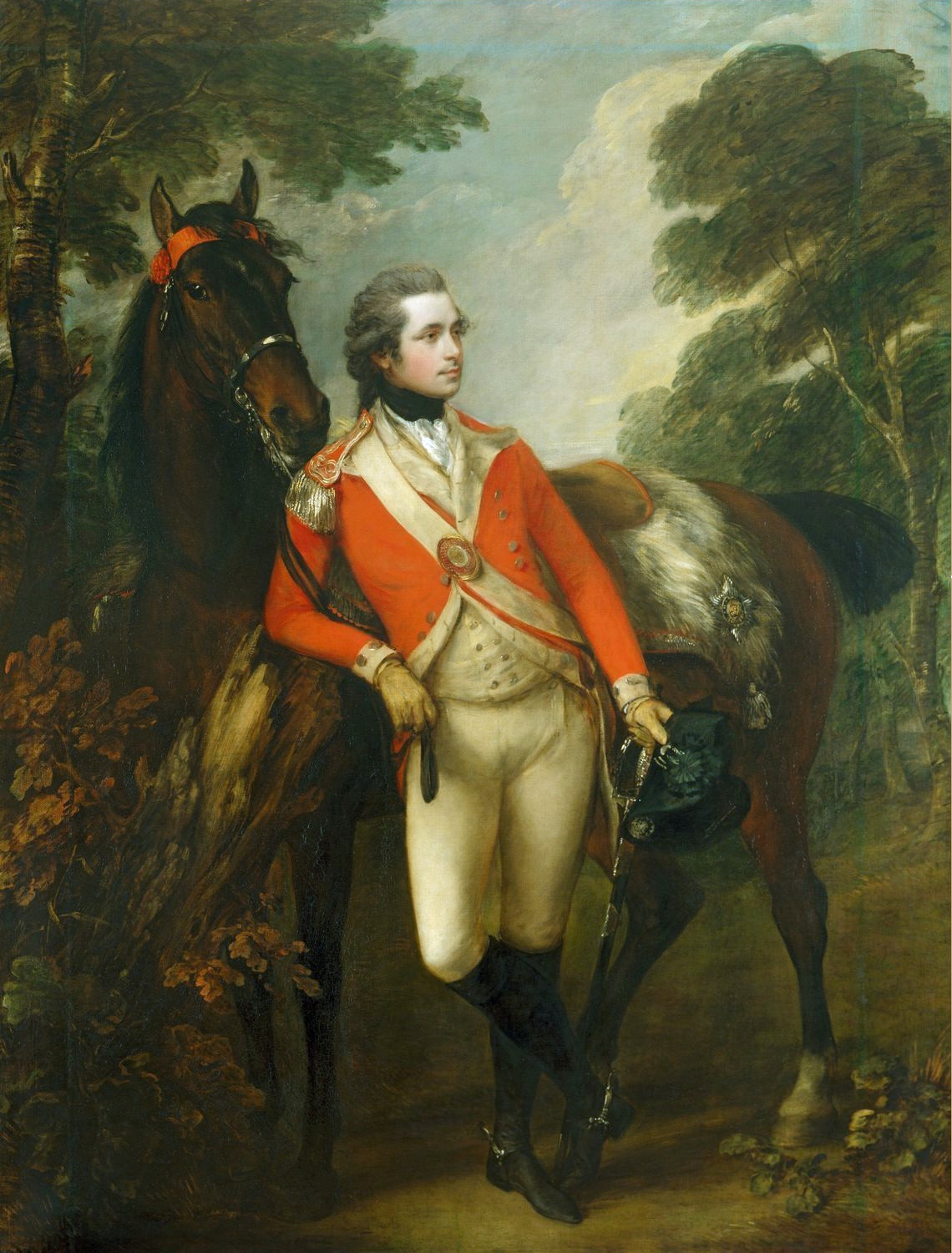
Portrait of John Hayes St Leger by Thomas Gainsborough

Wooded Landscape with Cattle by a Pool by Thomas Gainsborough

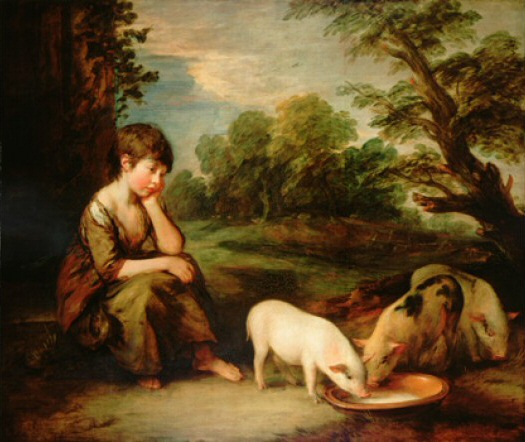
Girl with Pigs by Thomas Gainsborough

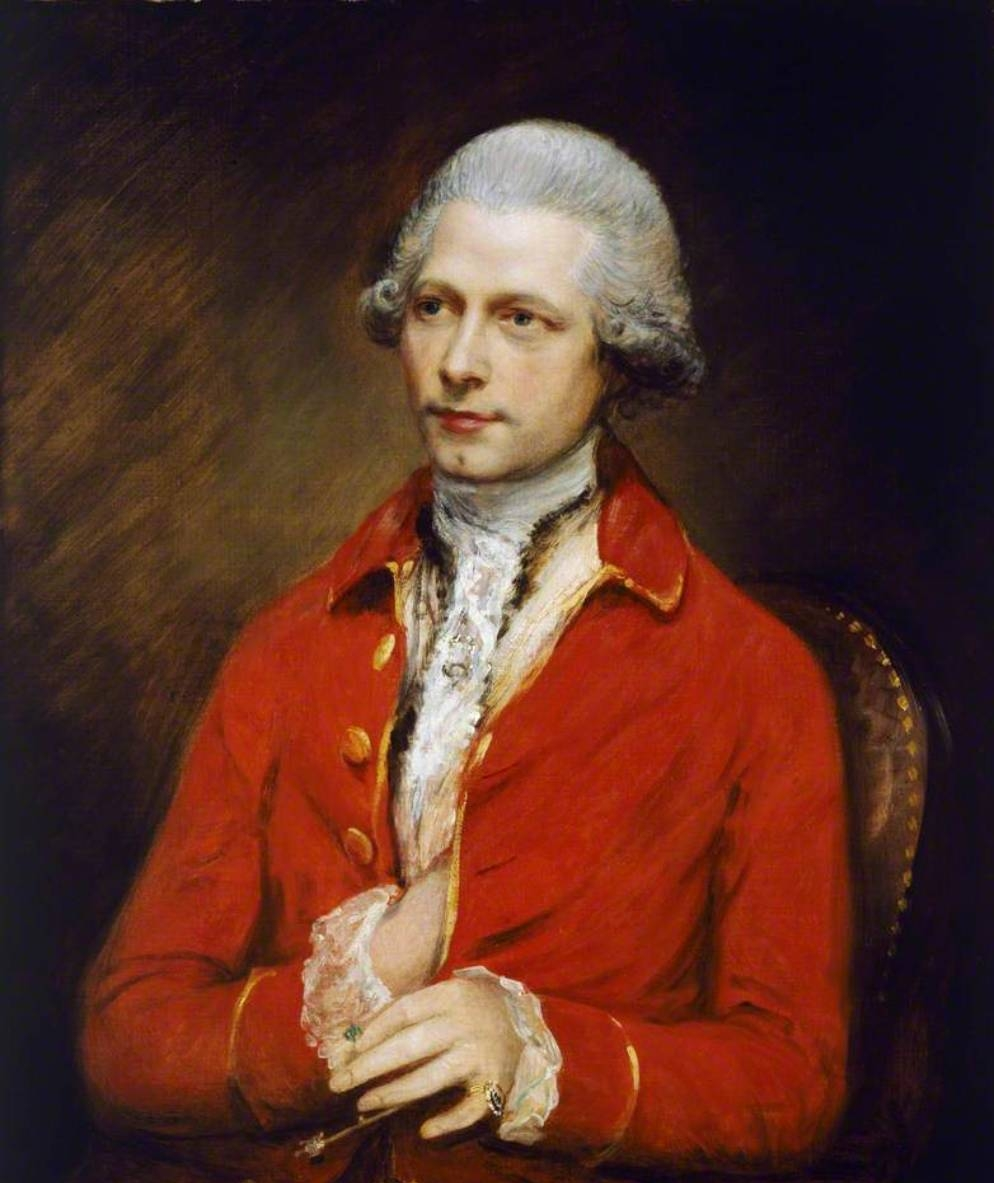
Portrait of John Joseph Merlin by Thomas Gainsborough

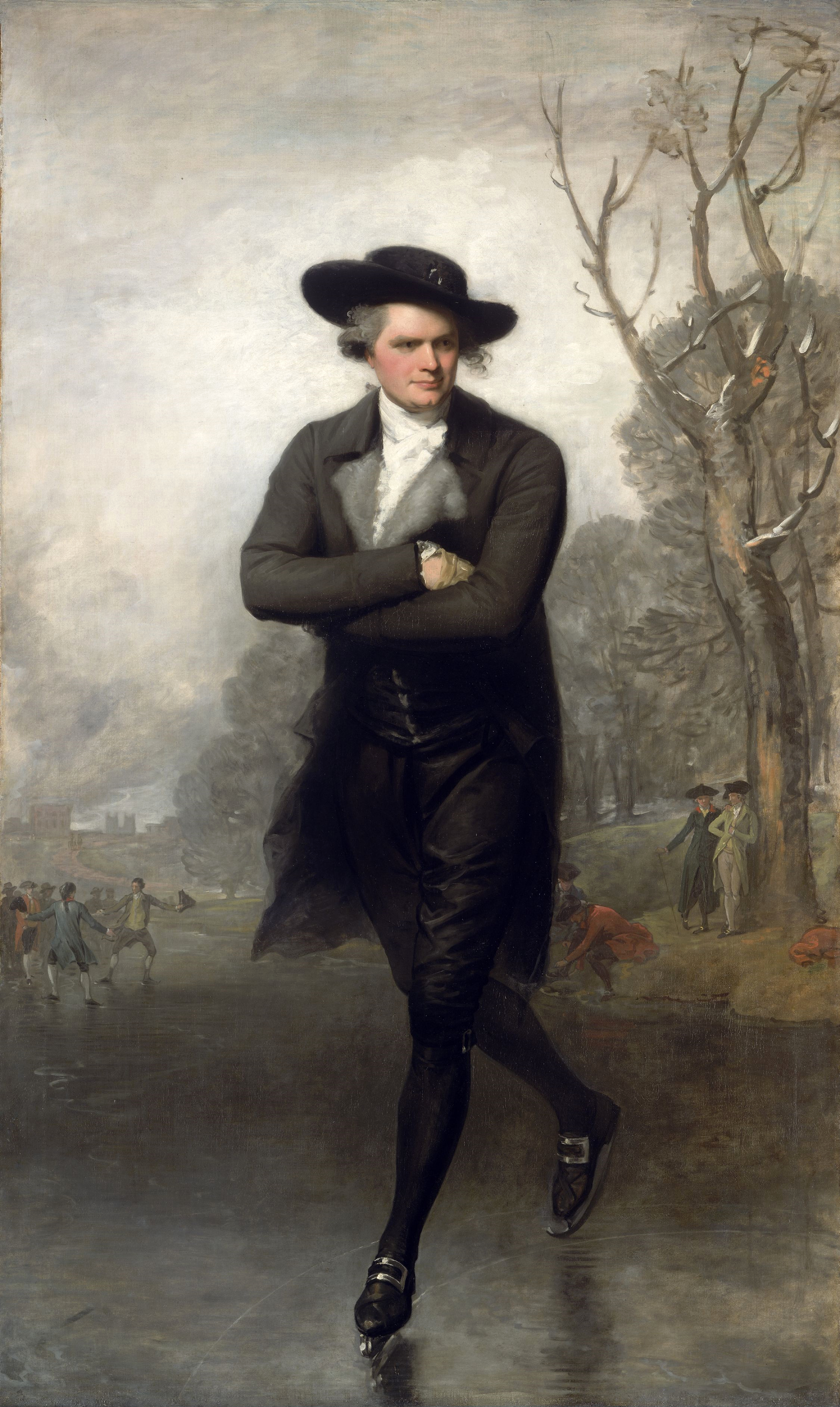
The Skater by Gilbert Stuart

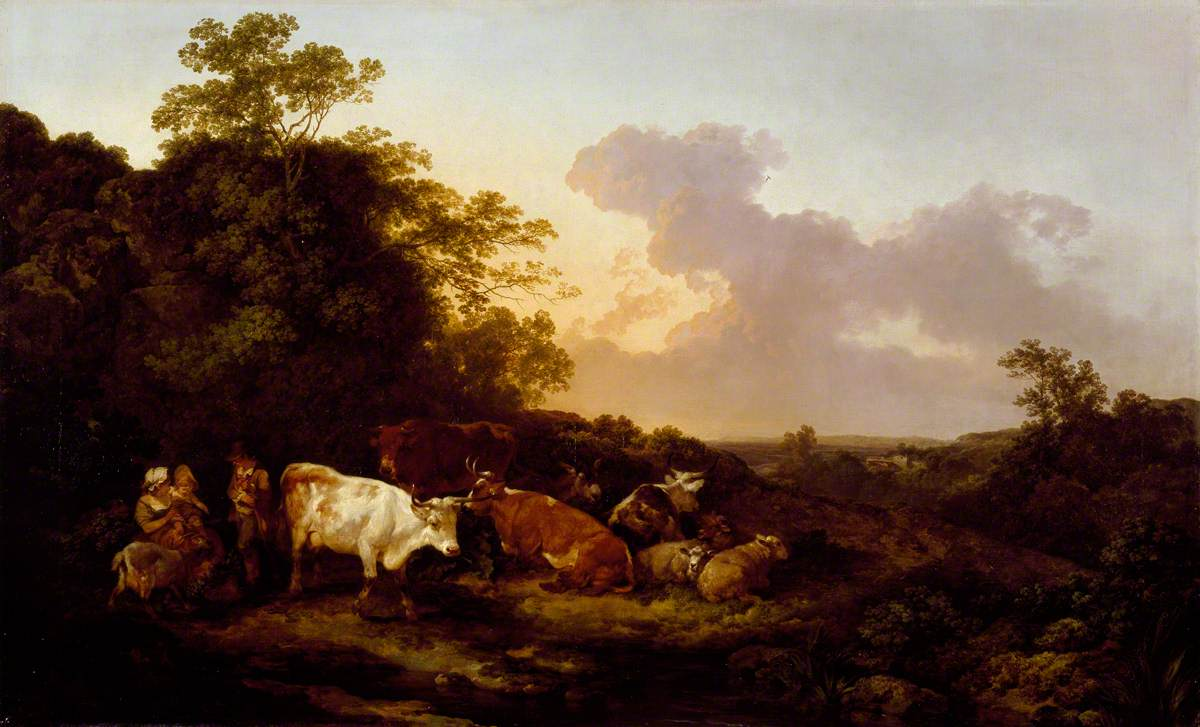
Landscape with Cattle and Figures, A Storm Coming On by Philip James de Loutherbourg

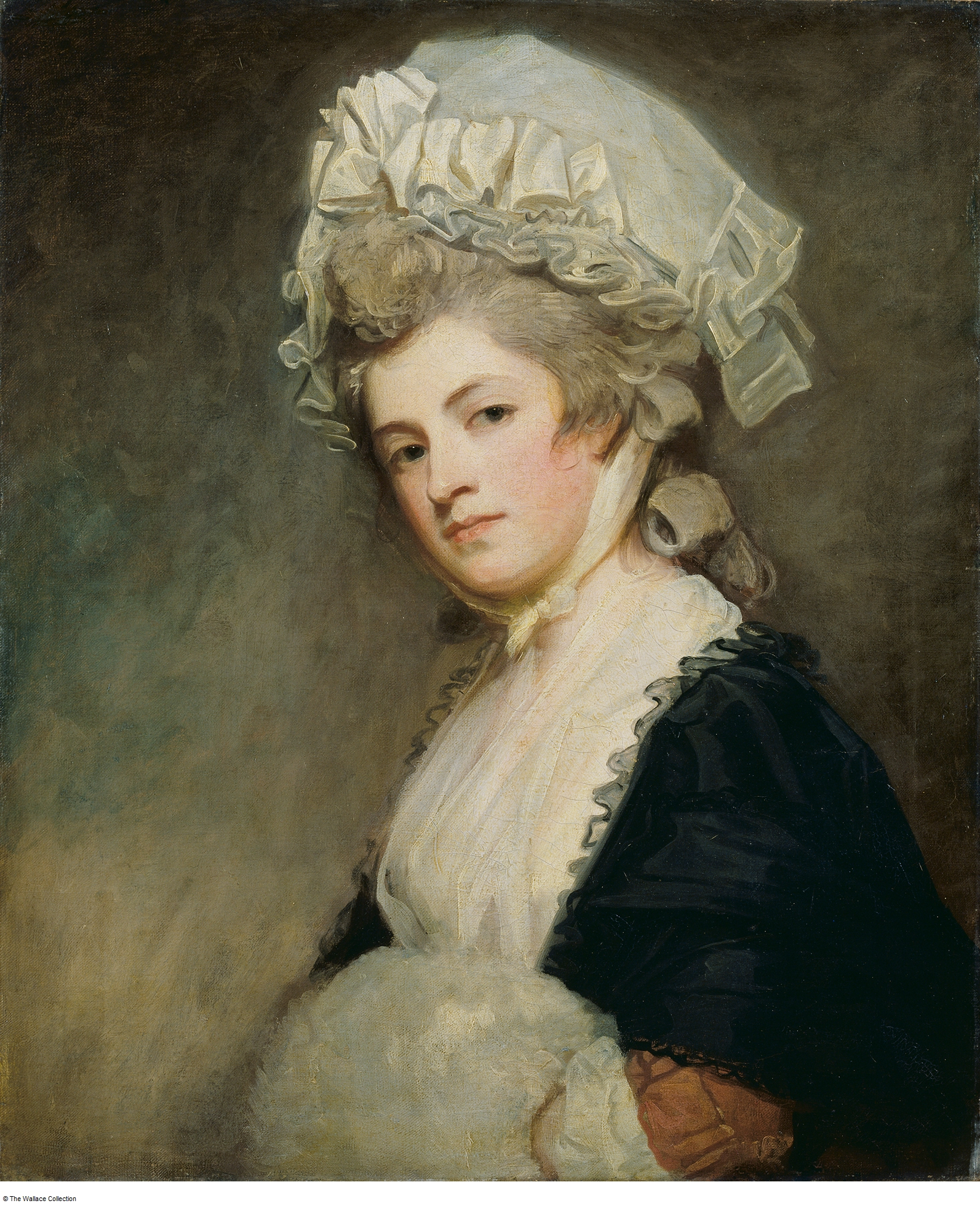
Portrait of Mary Robinson by George Romney

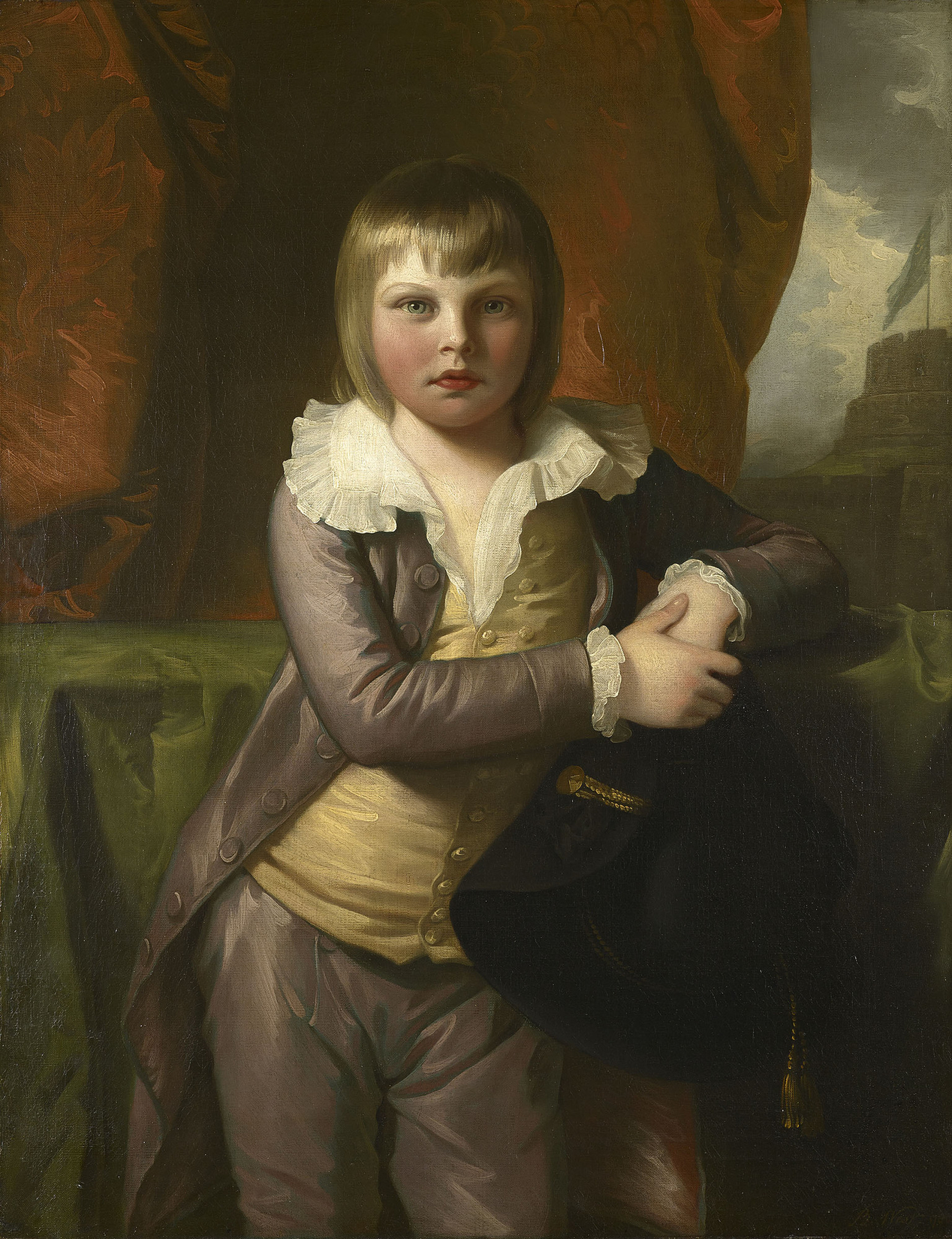
Portrait of Prince Augustus by Benjamin West

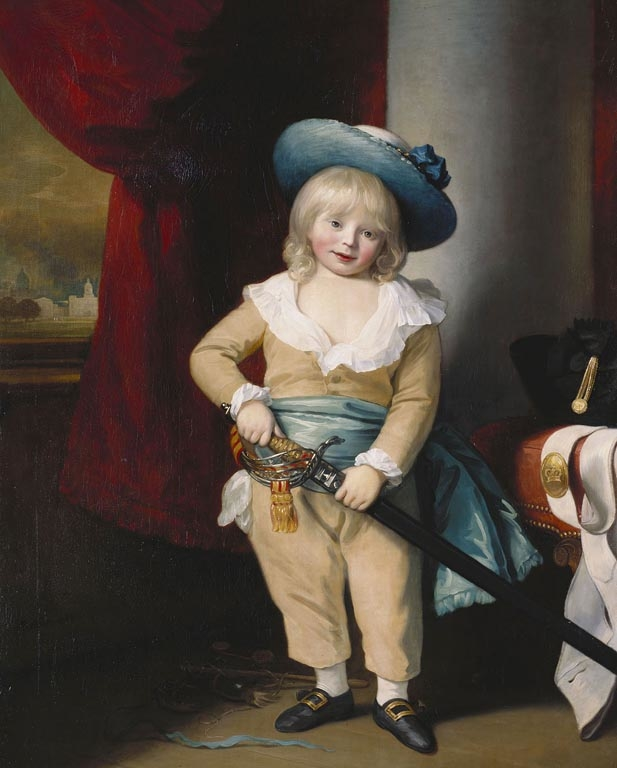
Portrait of Prince Octavius by Benjamin West

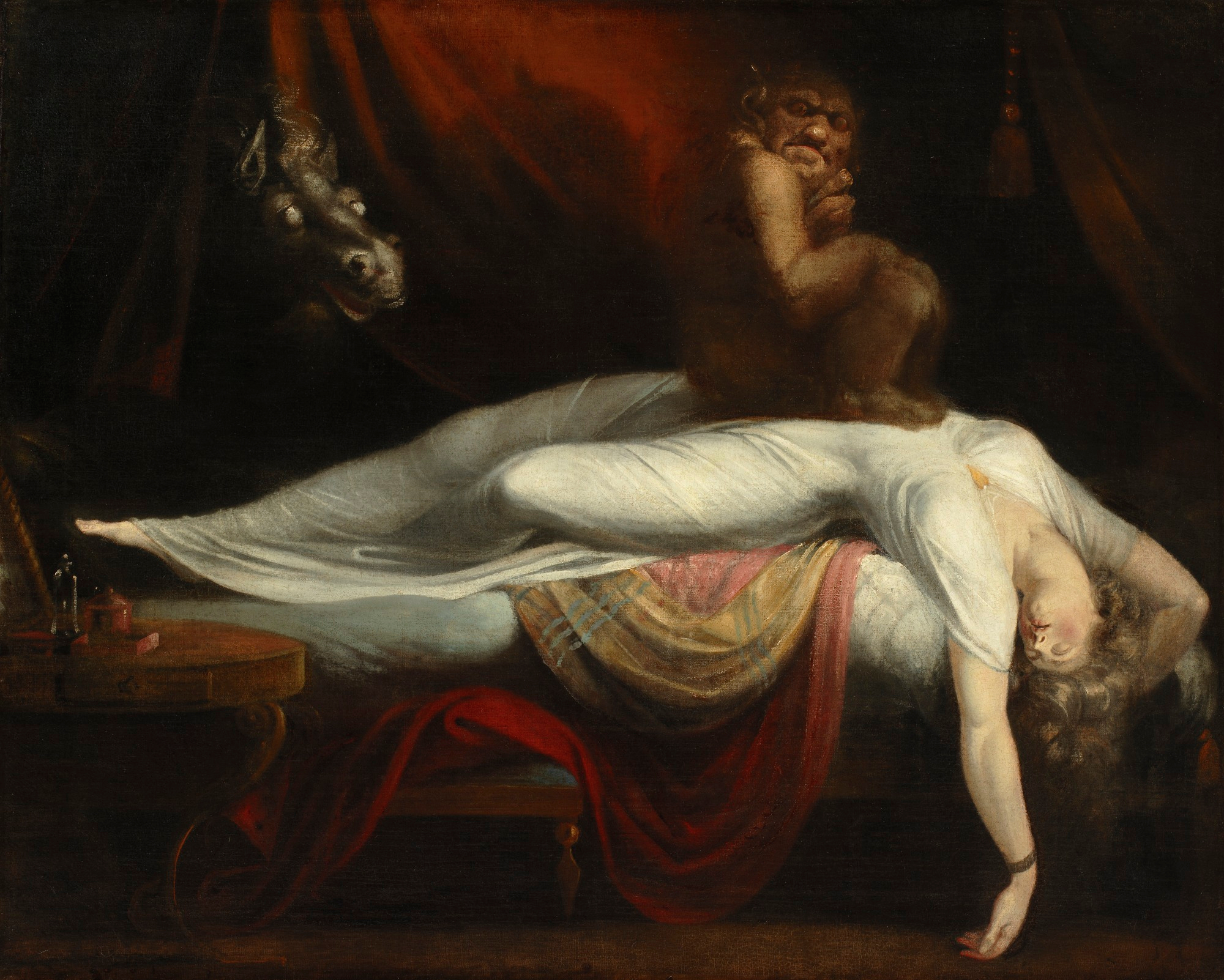
The Nightmare by Henry Fuseli

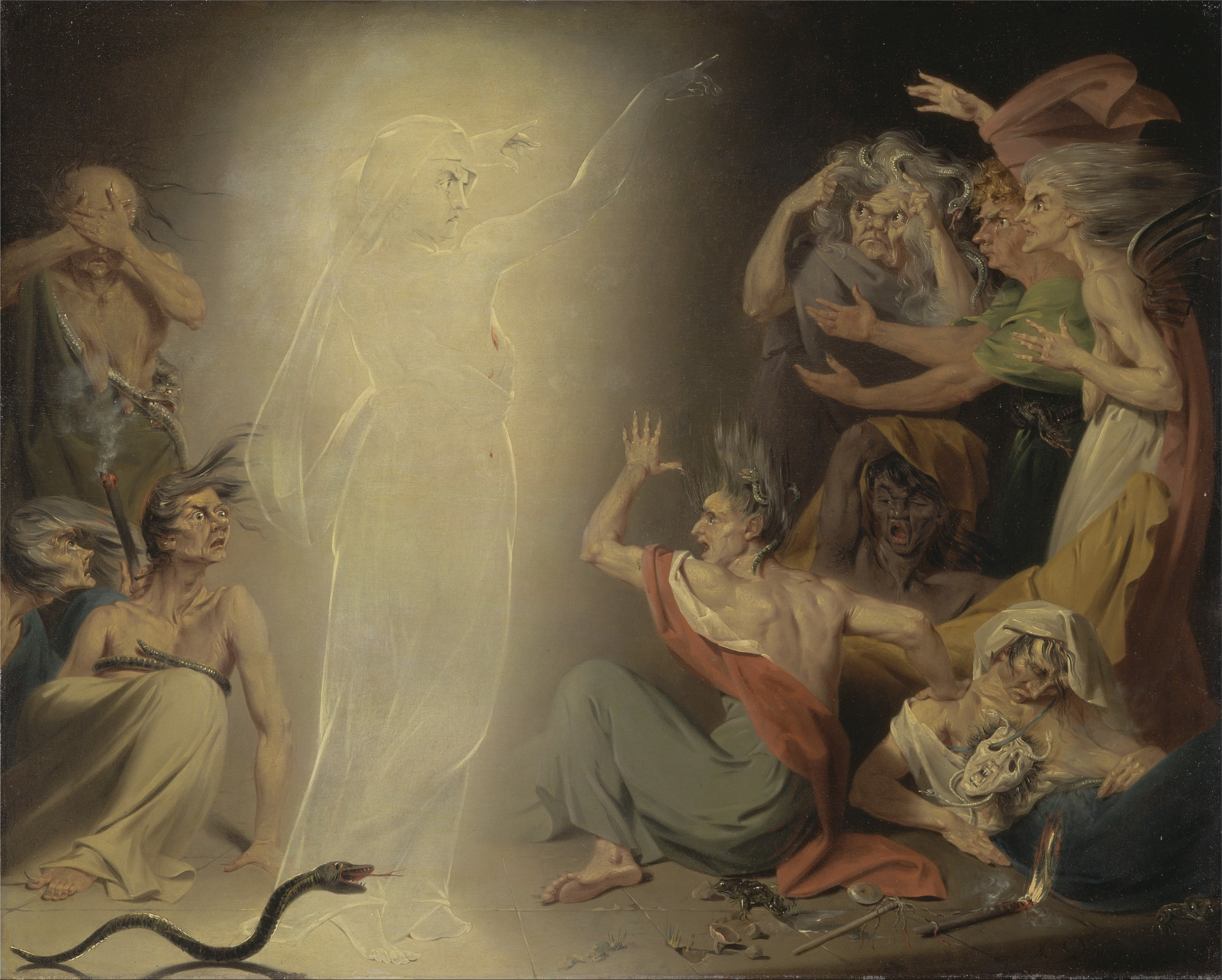
The Ghost of Clytemnestra Awakening the Furies by John Downman

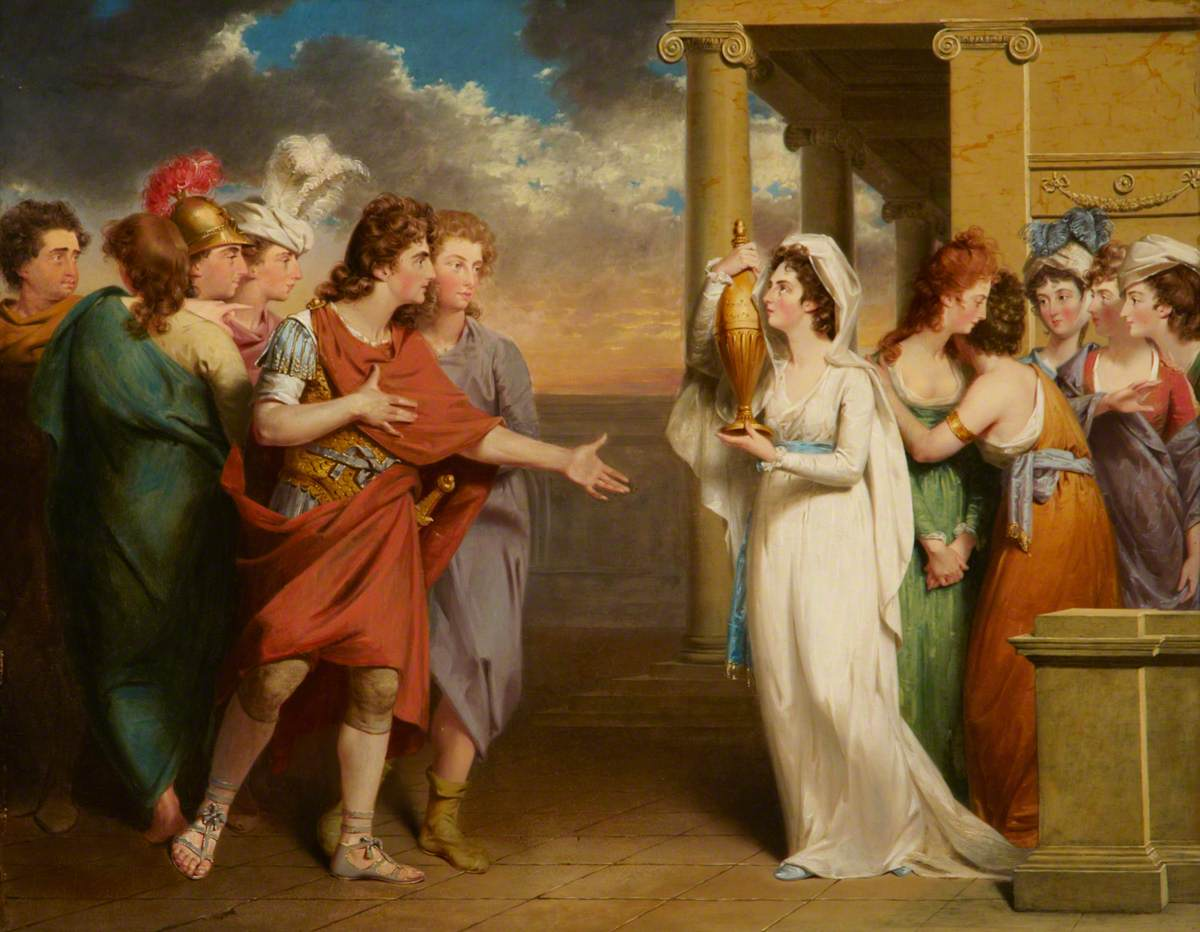
The Return of Orestes by John Downman

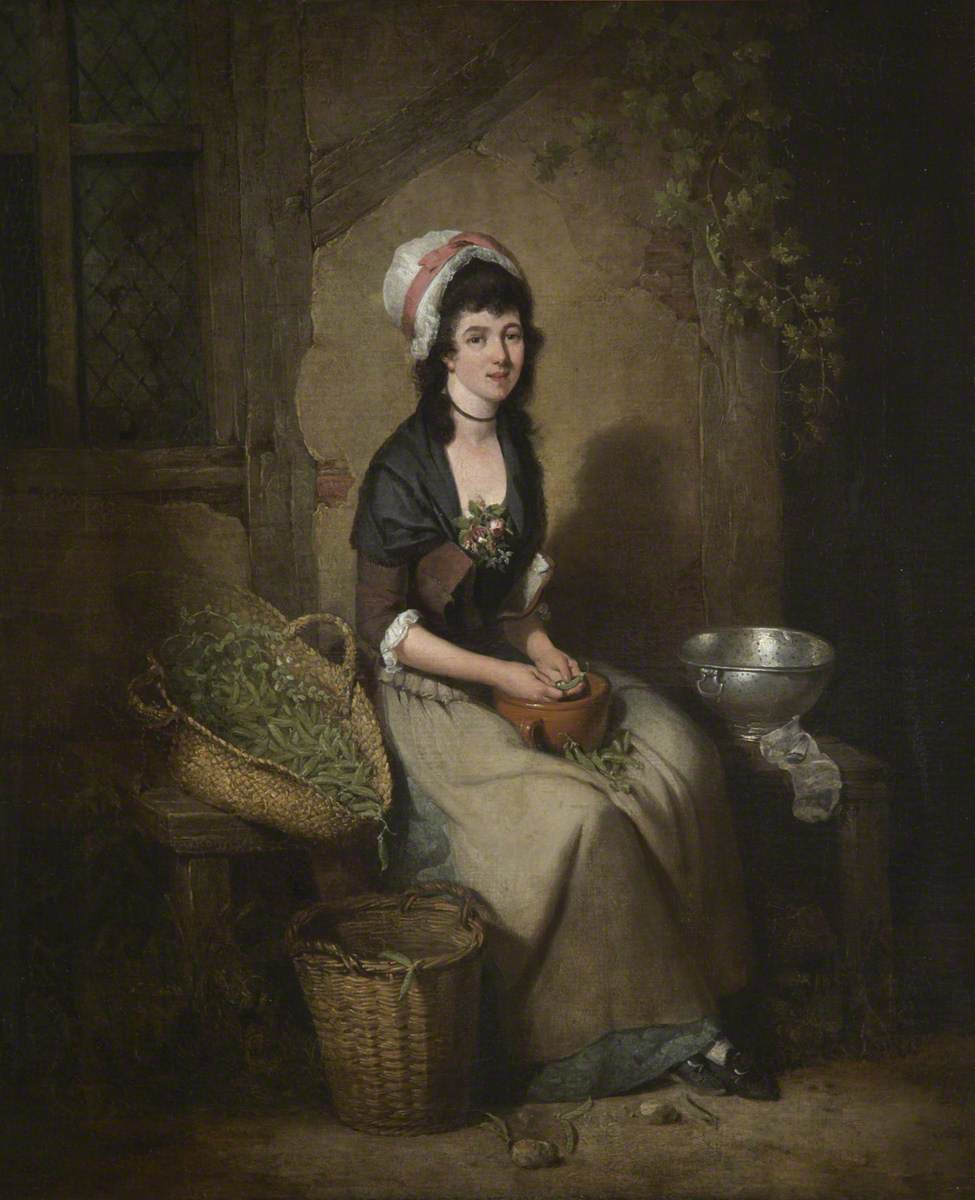
A Girl Shelling Peas by William Redmore Bigg

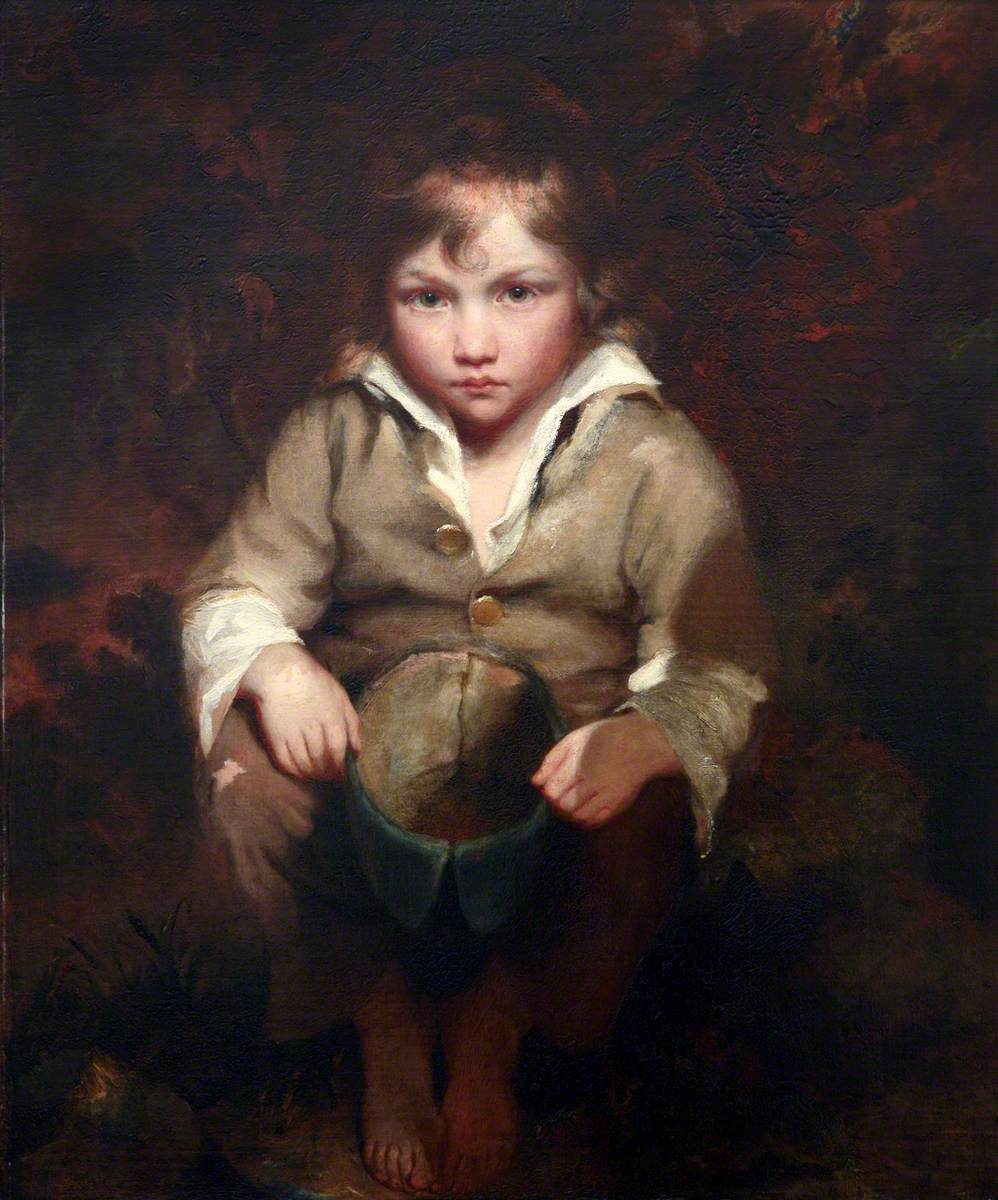
The Beggar Boy by John Opie

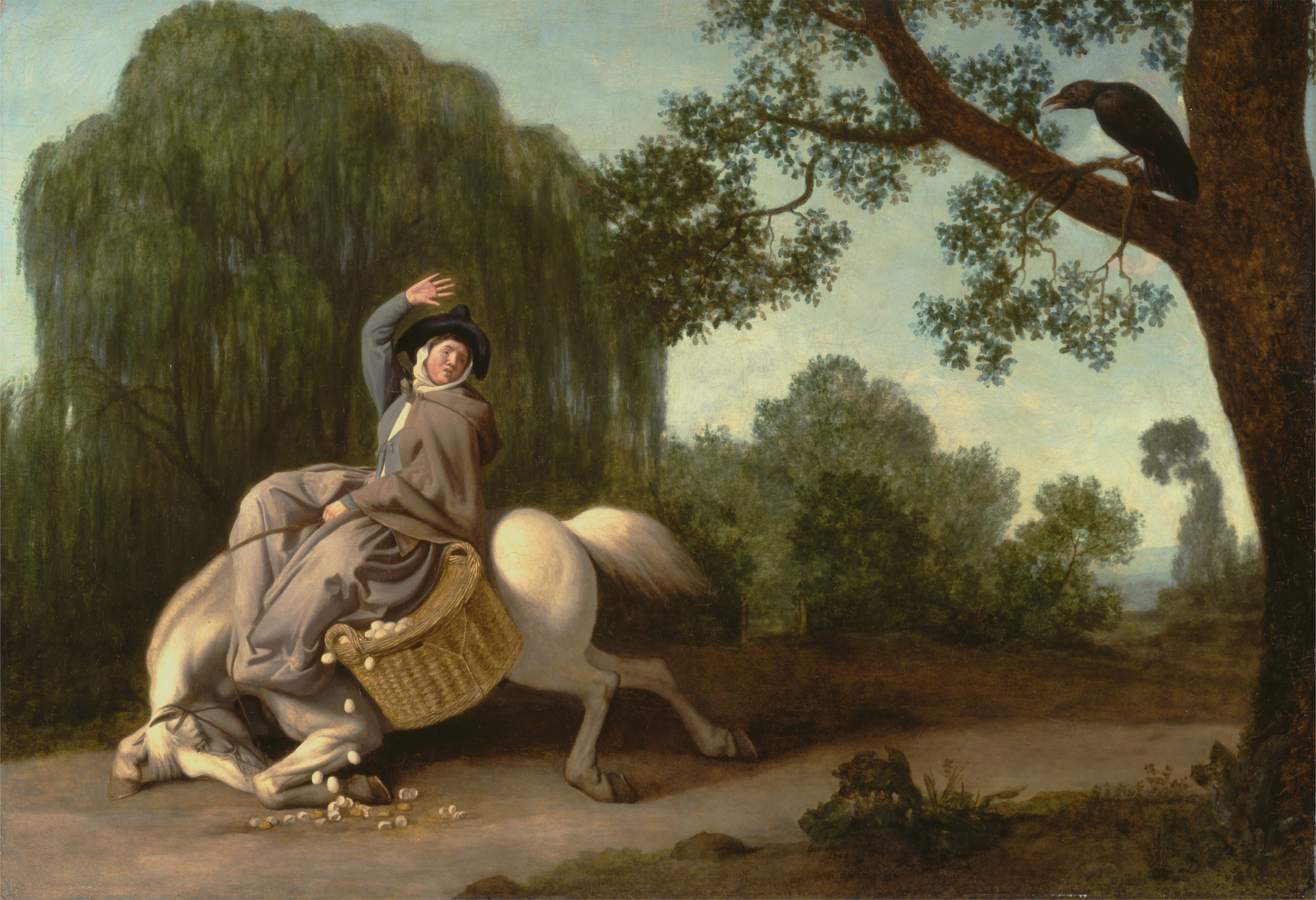
The Farmer's Wife and the Raven by George Stubbs

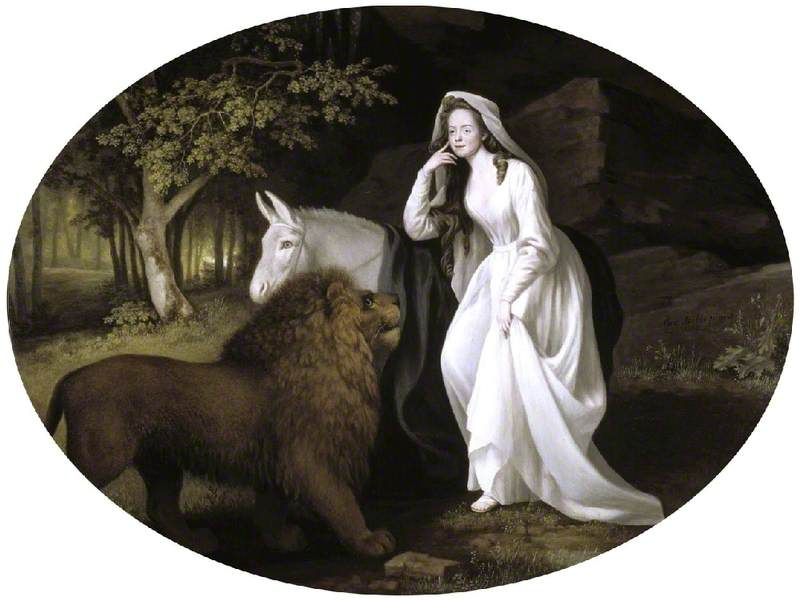
Isabella as Una in Spenser's Faerie Queene by George Stubbs

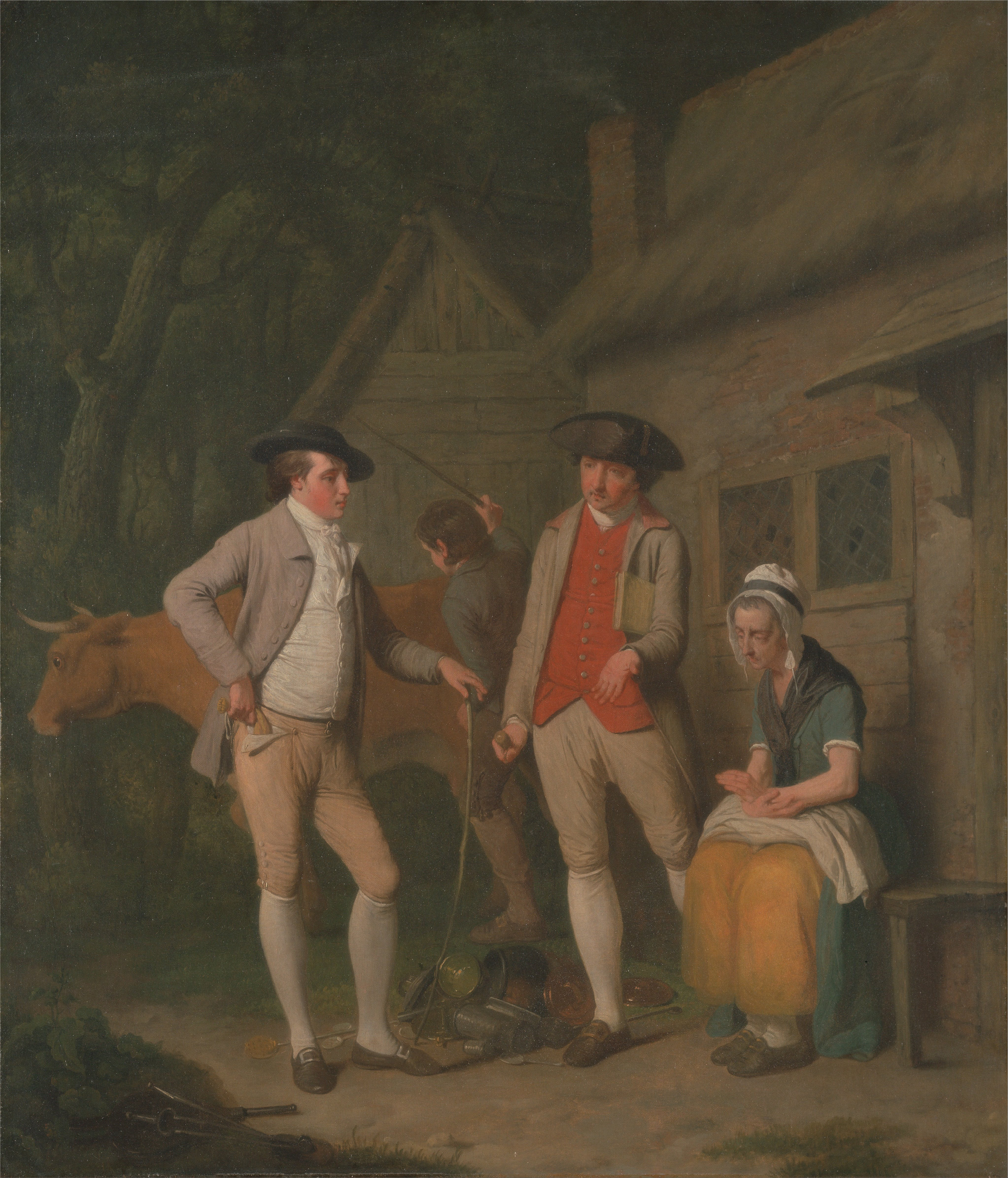
Widow Costard by Edward Penny

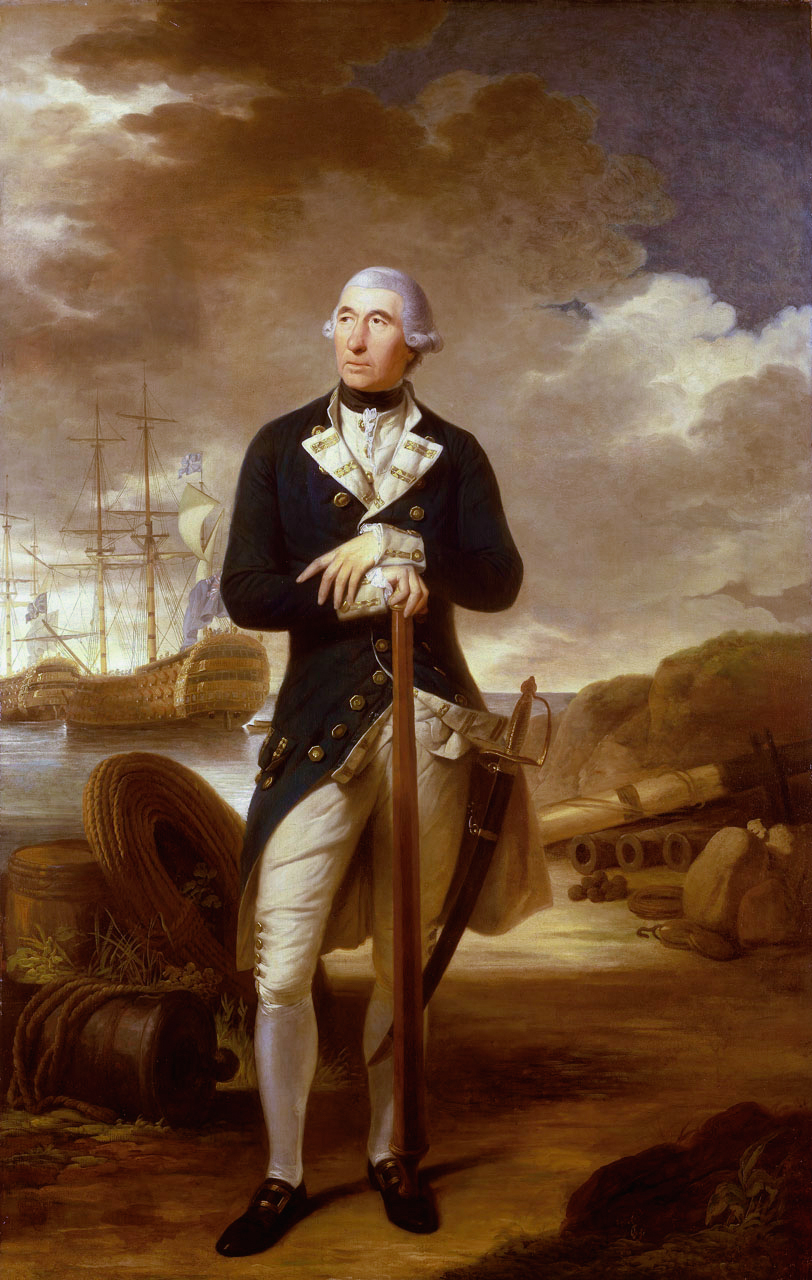
Portrait of Richard Kempenfelt by Tilly Kettle

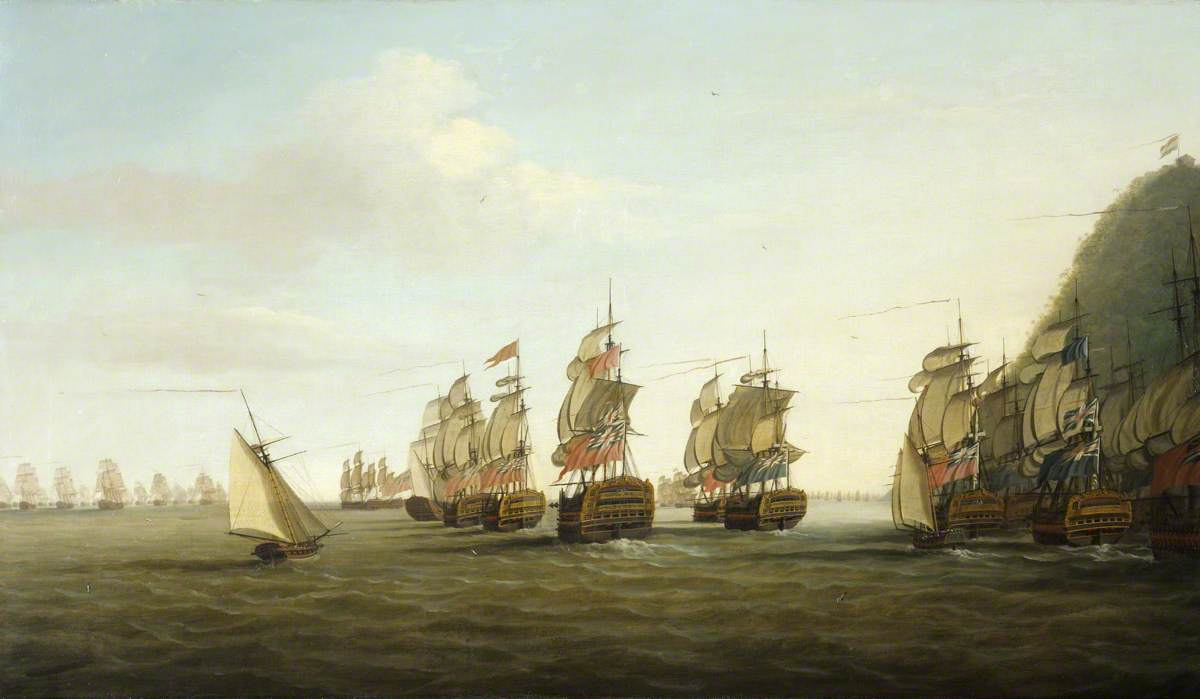
A British Squadron off St Lucia by Dominic Serres

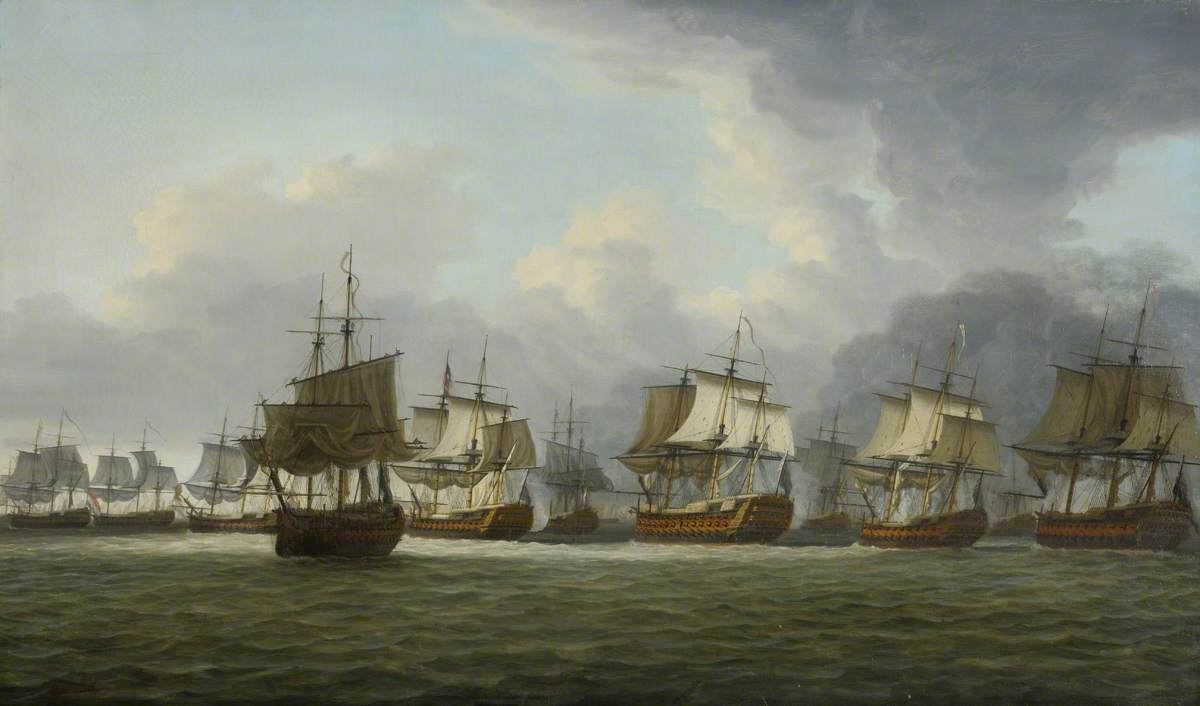
The Battle of the Dogger Bank by Dominic Serres

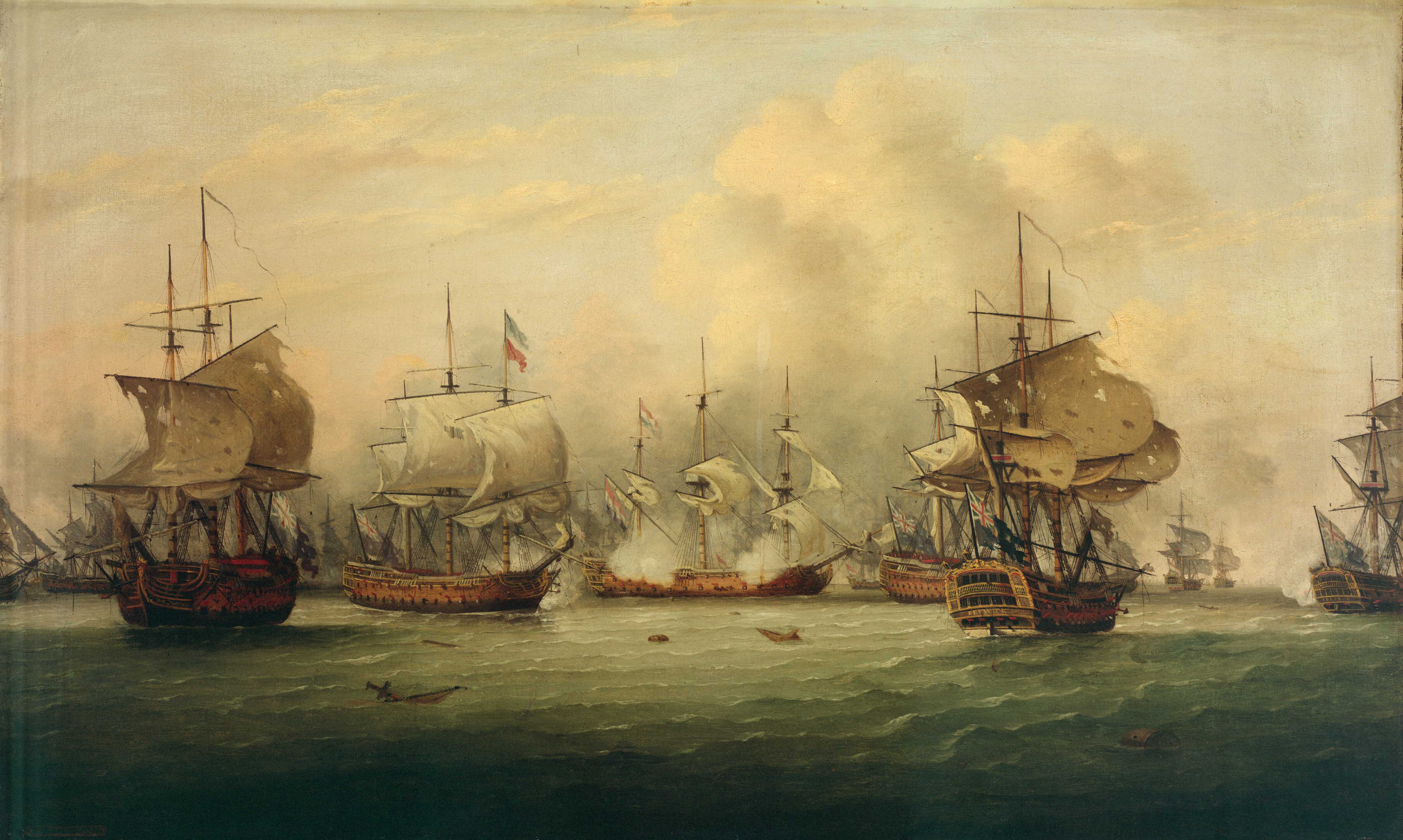
The Battle of Dogger Bank by Thomas Luny

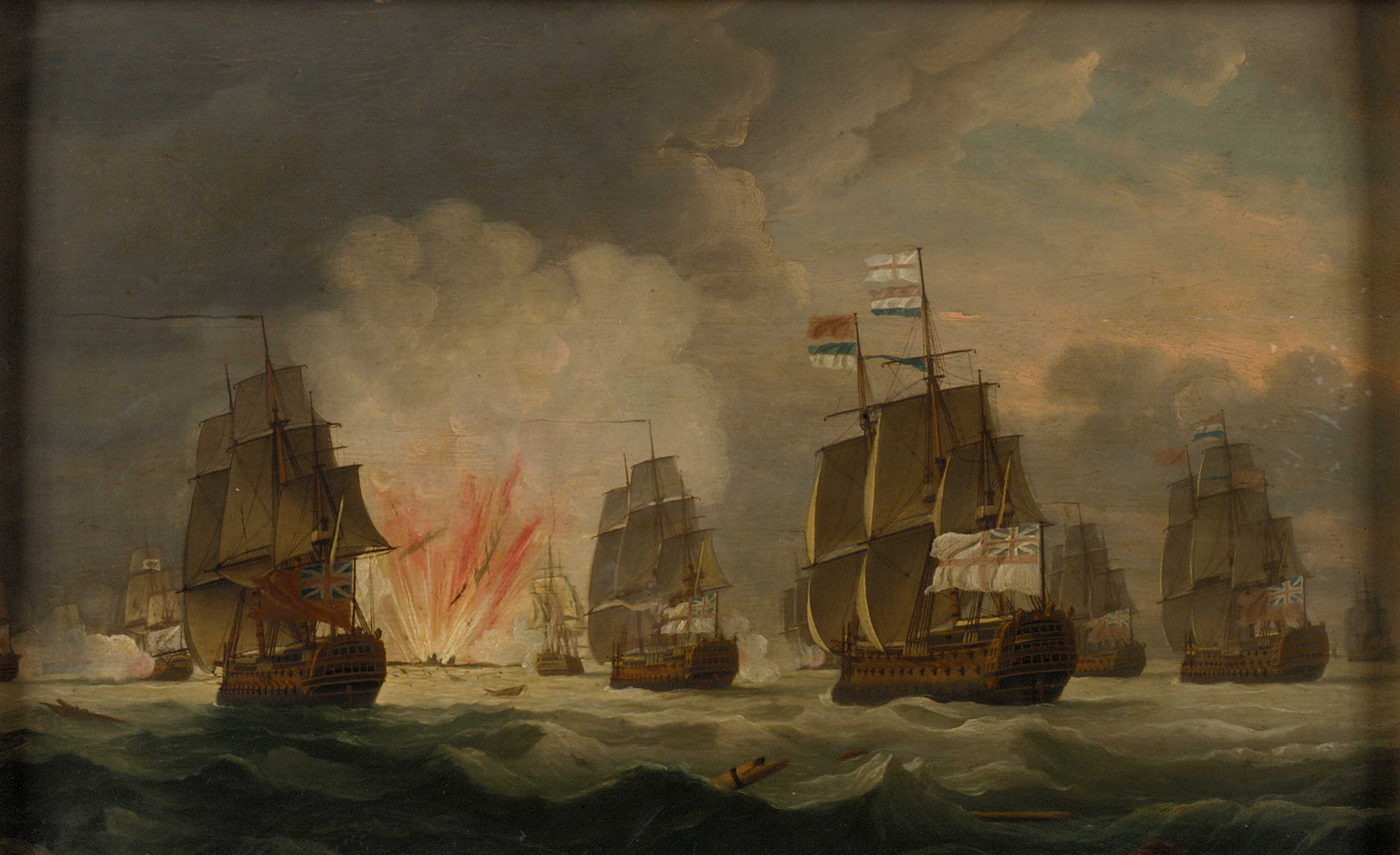
The Moonlight Battle by Thomas Luny

Portrait of Josiah Wedgwood by Joshua Reynolds

== See also ==
- Royal Academy Exhibition of 1783, also held at Somerset House

== Bibliography ==
- Barber, Tabitha (ed.) Now You See Us: Women Artists in Britain, 1520-1920. Tate Britain, 2024.
- Hamilton, James. Gainsborough: A Portrait. Hachette UK, 2017.
- Hoock, Holger. Empires of the Imagination: Politics, War, and the Arts in the British World, 1750–1850. Profile Books, 2010.
- McIntyre, Ian. Joshua Reynolds: The Life and Times of the First President of the Royal Academy. Allen Lane, 2003.
- Myrone, Martin, Frayling, Christopher & Warner, Marina. Gothic Nightmares: Fuseli, Blake and the Romantic Imagination. Harry N. Abrams, 2006.
