= Mary Robinson (poet) =

English poet and actress (1758–1800)

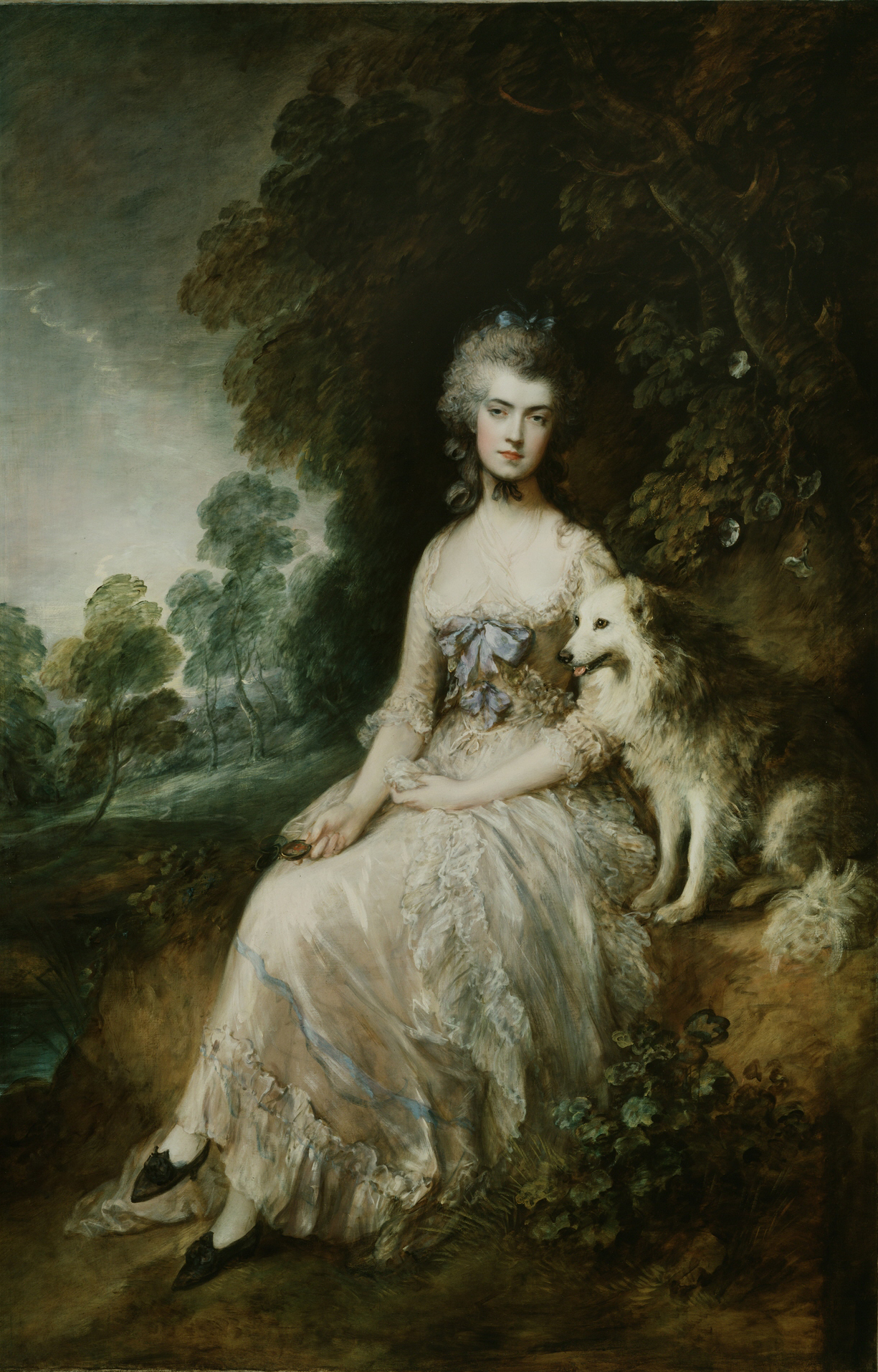
- Portrait of Mary Robinson by Thomas Gainsborough, 1781
- Born: Mary Darby; 27 November 1757; Bristol, England
- Died: 26 December 1800 (aged 43); Englefield Green, England
- Spouse: Thomas Robinson (m. 1772)
- Children: Maria Elizabeth Robinson

Mary Robinson (née Darby; 27 November 1757 – 26 December 1800) was an English actress, poet, dramatist, novelist and famous beauty, the subject of many portraits by the leading painters of the day. Born in Bristol, her career soon took her to London; she also lived in France and Germany for some years in the 1780s.

She enjoyed poetry from the age of seven and started working, first as a teacher and then as an actress, from the age of 14. She wrote many plays, poems and novels. She was a celebrity, initially as an actress, gossiped about in newspapers, famous for her acting and writing. During her lifetime she was known as "the English Sappho". She earned her nickname "Perdita" for her role as Perdita (heroine of Shakespeare's The Winter's Tale) in 1779, and was the first public mistress of King George IV while he was still Prince of Wales. Robinson is the author of the Gothic novels Vancenza; or, the Dangers of Credulity (1792) and Hubert de Sevrac (1796).

== Biography ==
=== Early life ===
Robinson was born in Bristol, England to Nicholas Darby, a naval captain, and his wife Hester (née Vanacott) who had married at Donyatt, Somerset, in 1749, and was baptised 'Polle(y)' (spelt 'Polle' in the official register and 'Polly' in the Bishop's Transcript) at St Augustine's Church, Bristol, 19 July 1757, the entry noting that she was born on 27 November 1756. In her memoirs, Robinson gives her birth in 1758, but the year 1757 seems more likely according to recently published research (see appendix to Byrne, 2005). Robinson attended a school in Bristol run by the social reformer Hannah More. More took her students, including Robinson, to see King Lear. Her father deserted her mother for a mistress, fleeing to America when Robinson was still a child. The family hoped for a reconciliation, but Captain Darby made it clear that this was not going to happen. In America, Captain Darby operated a whaling operation in Labrador which would bankrupt the family after its failure. Hester Darby supported herself and the five children born of the marriage by starting a school for young girls in Little Chelsea, London (where Robinson taught by her 14th birthday). However, during one of his brief returns to the family, Captain Darby had the school closed (which he was entitled to do by English law). Captain Darby died in the Russian naval service in 1785. When Robinson was 15 years old, Samuel Cox, a solicitor, told the leading actor David Garrick about Robinson and brought her to Garrick's home in the Adelphi. Garrick was profoundly impressed with Robinson. He was especially enchanted by her voice, remarking that it bore a resemblance to the much-admired Susannah Cibber. Garrick had just retired but decided to tutor Robinson in acting. Robinson noted, "My tutor [David Garrick] was the most sanguine in his expectations of my success, and every rehearsal seemed to strengthen his flattering opinion... He would sometimes dance a minuet with me, sometimes request me to sing the favourite ballads of the day."

=== Marriage ===
When Robinson was about 14 years old, Hester Darby encouraged her to accept the proposal of an articled clerk, Thomas Robinson, who claimed to have an inheritance. Mary was against this idea; however, after falling ill and watching him take care of her and her younger brother, she felt that she owed him, and she did not want to disappoint her mother who was pushing for the engagement. After the early marriage, Robinson discovered her husband did not have an inheritance. He continued to live an elaborate lifestyle, however, and made no effort to hide multiple affairs. Subsequently, Mary supported their family. After her husband squandered their money, the couple fled to Talgarth, Breconshire (where Robinson's only daughter, Mary Elizabeth, was born in 1774). Here they lived in a fairly large estate, called Tregunter Park. Eventually her husband was imprisoned for debt in Fleet Prison where she lived with him for many months. While it was common for the wives of prisoners to live with their husbands while indebted, children were usually sent to live with relatives to keep them away from the dangers of prison. However, Robinson was deeply devoted to her daughter Maria, and when her husband was imprisoned, Robinson brought the six-month-old baby with her.

It was in Fleet Prison that Robinson's literary career really began, as she found that she could publish poetry to earn money, and to give her an escape from the harsh reality that had become her life. Her first book, Poems By Mrs. Robinson, was published in 1775 by C. Parker. Additionally, Robinson's husband was offered work in the form of copying legal documents so he could try to pay back some of his debts, but he refused to do anything. Robinson, in an effort to keep the family together and to get back to normal life outside of prison, took the job instead, collecting the pay that her husband neglected to earn. During this time, Mary Robinson found a patron in Georgiana Cavendish, Duchess of Devonshire, who sponsored the publication of Robinson's second volume of poems, Captivity.

=== Theatre ===
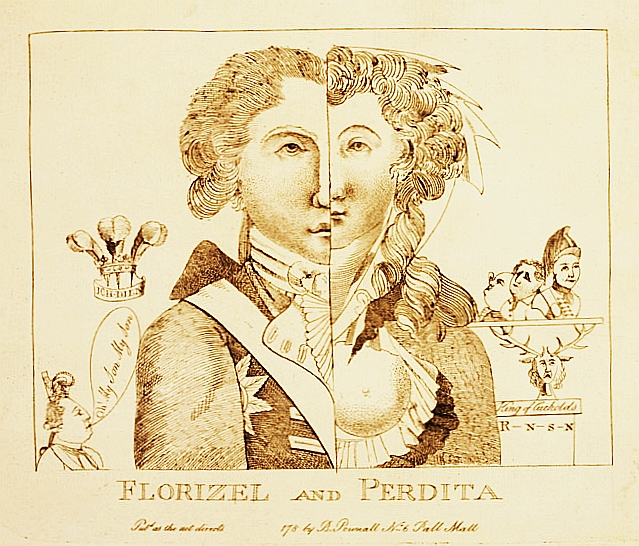
Caricature of the Prince of Wales as Florizel and Mary Robinson as Perdita, 1783

After her husband obtained his release from prison, Robinson decided to return to the theatre. She launched her acting career and took to the stage playing Juliet in William Shakespeare's Romeo and Juliet at Drury Lane Theatre in December 1776. The famous playwright, author, and Member of Parliament Richard Brinsley Sheridan gave significant support for Robinson. He was a constant presence by her side, offering encouragement as she embarked on the stage in this role. Robinson was best known for her facility with the 'breeches parts', and her performances as Viola in William Shakespeare'sTwelfth Night and Rosalind in As You Like It won her extensive praise. But she gained popularity with playing in Florizel and Perdita, an adaptation of Shakespeare, with the role of Perdita (heroine of The Winter's Tale) in 1779. It was during this performance that she attracted the notice of the young Prince of Wales, later King George IV of the United Kingdom. He offered her 20,000 pounds to become his mistress. During this time, the very young Emma, Lady Hamilton sometimes worked as her maid and dresser at the theatre.

With her new social prominence, Robinson became a trend-setter in London, introducing a loose, flowing muslin style of gown based upon Grecian statuary that became known as the Perdita. It took Robinson a considerable amount of time to decide to leave her husband for the prince, as she did not want to be seen by the public as that type of woman (but she did have many love affairs in later life). Throughout much of her life she struggled to live in the public eye and also to stay true to the values in which she believed. She eventually gave in to be with the prince. However, the prince ended the affair in 1781, refusing to pay the promised sum, as the money was not rightfully his. "Perdita" Robinson was left to support herself through an annuity of $500 promised by the Crown (but rarely paid), in return for some letters written by the prince, and through her writings. After her affair with the young Prince of Wales she became famous for her rides in her extravagant carriages and her celebrity-like perception by the public.

=== Later life and death ===
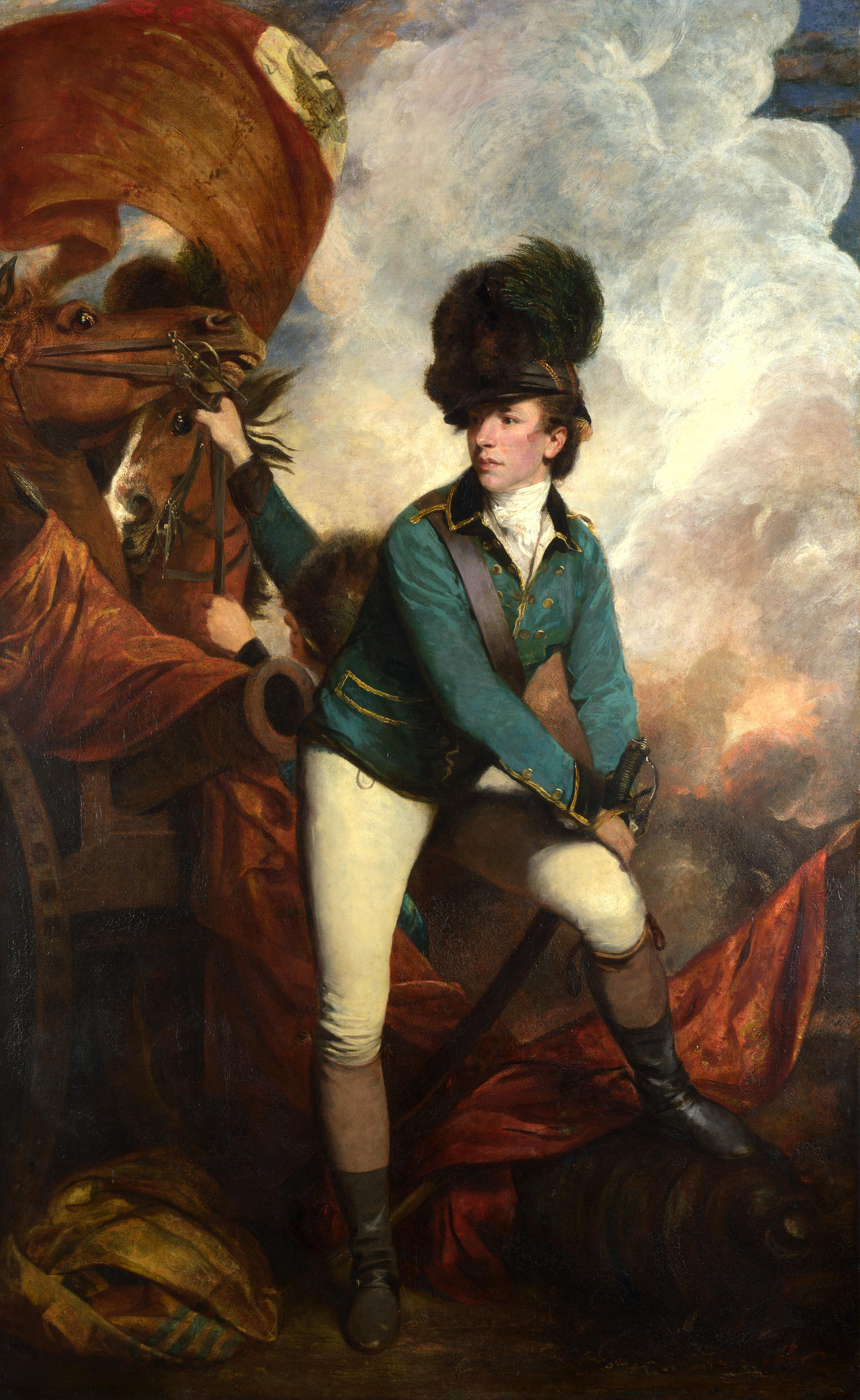
Portrait of Banastre Tarleton by Joshua Reynolds

Mary Robinson, who now lived separately from her husband, went on to have several love affairs, most notably with Banastre Tarleton, a soldier who had recently distinguished himself fighting in the American War of Independence. Prior to their relationship, Robinson had been having an affair with a man named Lord Malden. According to one account, Malden and Tarleton were betting men, and Malden was very confident of Robinson's loyalty to him, believing that no man could ever take her from him. As such, he made a bet of a thousand guineas that none of the men in his circle could seduce her. Unfortunately for Malden, Robinson proved to be unfaithful and Tarleton who accepted the bet was able to seduce her, but they eventually establish a relationship that would last the next 15 years. This relationship, though rumoured to have started on a bet, saw Tarleton's rise in military rank and his concomitant political successes, Mary's own various illnesses, financial vicissitudes and the efforts of Tarleton's own family to end the relationship. They had no children, although Robinson had a miscarriage. However, in the end, Tarleton married Susan Bertie, an heiress and an illegitimate daughter of the young 4th Duke of Ancaster, and niece of his sisters Lady Willoughby de Eresby and Lady Cholmondeley. In 1783, Robinson suffered a mysterious illness that left her partially paralysed. Biographer Paula Byrne speculates that a streptococcal infection resulting from a miscarriage led to a severe rheumatic fever that left her disabled for the rest of her life.

From the late 1780s, Robinson became distinguished for her poetry and was called "the English Sappho". In addition to poems, she wrote eight novels, three plays, feminist treatises, and an autobiographical manuscript that was incomplete at the time of her death. Like her contemporary Mary Wollstonecraft, she championed the rights of women and was an ardent supporter of the French Revolution. She died in poverty at Englefield Cottage, Englefield Green, Surrey, 26 December 1800, aged 43, having survived several years of ill health, most notably a miscarriage which left her with progressive lower-limb paralysis. She was survived by her daughter, Maria Elizabeth (1774–1818), who was also a published novelist. Administration of her estate was granted to her husband Thomas Robinson from whom she had long been separated and who in 1803 inherited a substantial estate from his half-brother William. One of Robinson's dying wishes was to see the rest of her works published. She tasked her daughter, Maria Robinson, with publishing most of these works. She also placed her Memoirs in the care of her daughter, insisting that she publish the work. Maria Robinson published Memoirs just a few months later.

=== Portraits ===
During her lifetime, Robinson also enjoyed the distinction of having her image captured by the most notable artists of the period. The earliest known, drawn by James Roberts II, depicts "Mrs. Robinson in the Character of Amanda" from Cibber's Love's Last Shift in 1777. In 1781, Thomas Gainsborough produced an oil sketch, Mrs. Mary Robinson 'Perdita', and an untitled study. That year, George Romney also painted Mrs. Mary Robinson and John Keyse Sherwin printed an untitled portrait. Joshua Reynolds sketched a study for what became Portrait of a Lady in 1782, and in 1784, he finished Mrs Robinson as Contemplation, for which he also sketched a study. George Dance the Younger sketched a later portrait in 1793.

== Literature ==
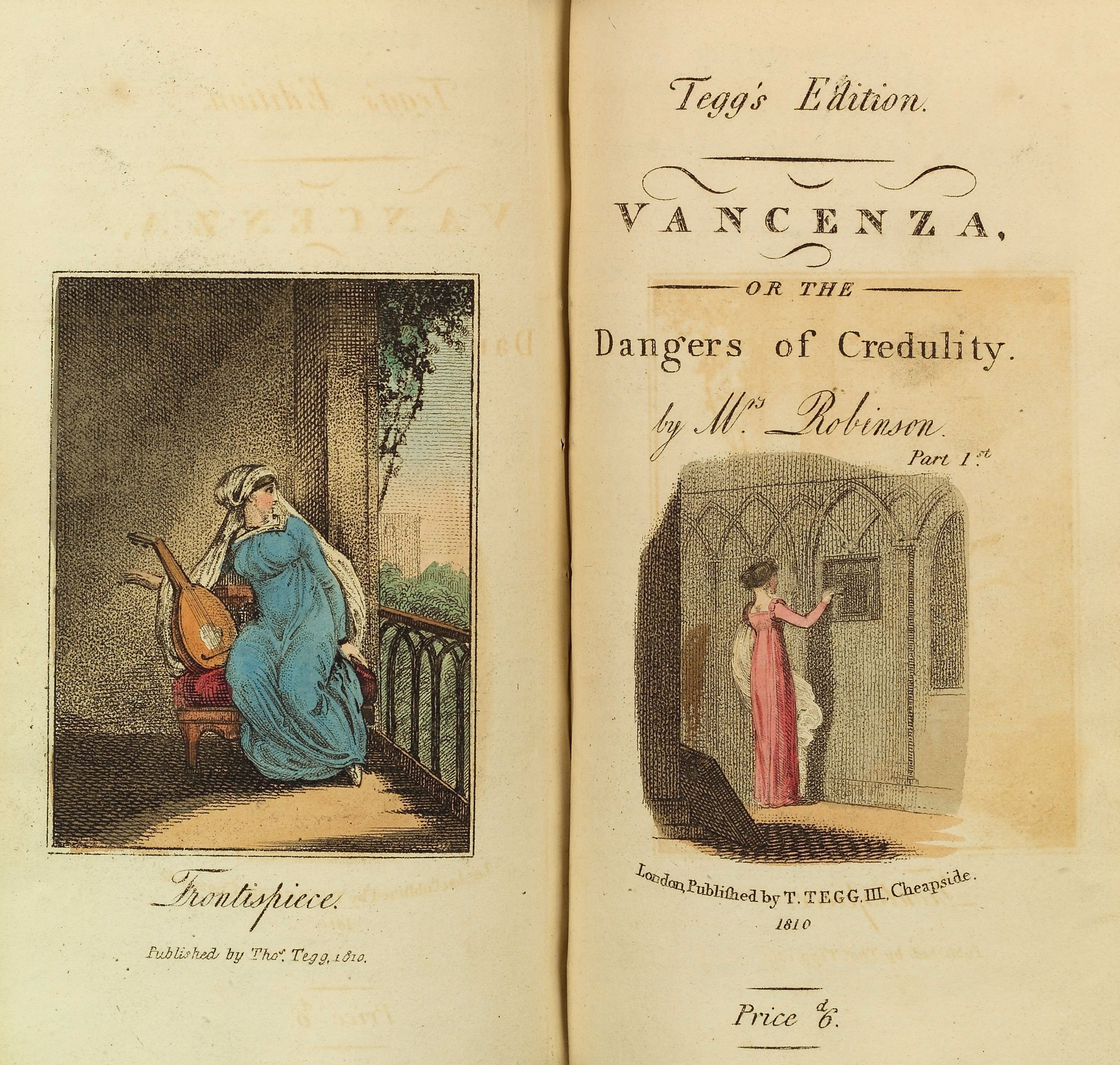
Title and frontispiece for Robinson's first novel, Vancenza; or the Dangers of Credulity, 1810 edition

In 1792, Robinson published her most popular novel, a Gothic novel titled Vancenza; or The Dangers of Credulity. The books were "sold out by lunch time on the first day and five more editions quickly followed, making it one of the top-selling novels in the latter part of the eighteenth century." It did not receive either critical or popular acclaim. In 1794, she wrote The Widow; or, A Picture of Modern Times, which portrayed themes of manners in the fashionable world. Since Robinson was a fashion icon and very much involved in the fashion world, the novel did not find much of a favourable reception from contemporary readers. In 1796, she wrote Angelina: A Novel. This novel, which offers Robinson's thoughts on the afterlife of her literary career, cost more money than it brought in.

There has been an increase in scholarly attention to Robinson's literary output in recent years. While most of the early literature written about Robinson focused on her sexuality, emphasising her affairs and fashions, she also spoke out about women's place in the literary world, for which she began to receive the attention of feminists and literary scholars in the 1990s. Robinson recognised that "women writers were deeply ambivalent about the myths of authorship their male counterparts had created." As a result she sought to elevate women's place in the literary world by recognising women writers in her own work. In A Letter to the Women of England, Robinson includes an entire page dedicated to English women writers to support her notion that they were just as capable as men of being successful in the literary world. These ideas have continued to keep Robinson relevant in literary discussions today. In addition to maintaining literary and cultural notability, she has regained a degree of celebrity in recent years when several biographies about her have appeared. Perdita: The Literary, Theatrical, and Scandalous Life of Mary Robinson, by Paula Byrne, became a top-10 best-seller after being selected for the Richard & Judy Book Club.

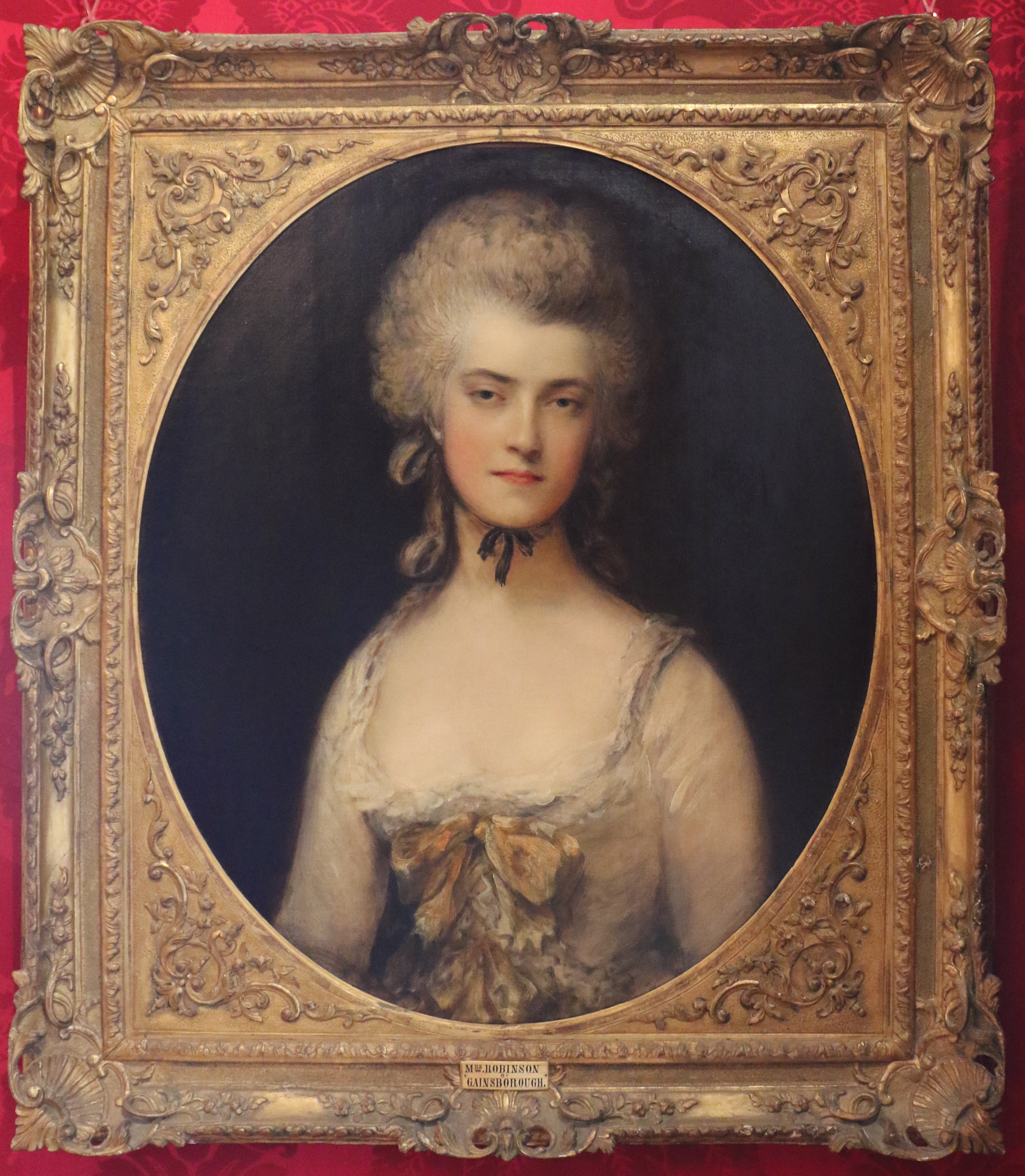
Mrs Robinson by Thomas Gainsborough, 1781

An eight-volume scholarly edition of Robinson's complete works was published in 2009–2010. In 2011, Daniel Robinson (no relation), editor of the poetry for that edition, published the first scholarly monograph to focus exclusively on her literary achievement--The Poetry of Mary Robinson: Form and Fame. A second monograph on Robinson's literary career, Mary Robinson and the Genesis of Romanticism: Literary Dialogues and Debts, 1784–1821, by Ashley Cross, appeared in 2016. Although, Robinson's novels were not as successful as she hoped, she had a talent for her poetry. Her ability to produce poetry can be seen furthermore in her poems titled "Sappho and Phaeon". Since the press had given her the name "The English Sappho", a clear relationship can be drawn between these poems and her literary name. The poems are love poems and many scholars have come to the conclusion that they represent her affairs with the Prince of Wales. Mary Darby Robinson was not only praised in literary circles for her poetry but also for her works written in prose. The two best known examples are "A Letter to the Women of England" (1798) and "The Natural Daughter" (1799). Both her works are dealing with the role of women during the Romantic Era. Mary Robinson as much as Mary Wollstonecraft tried to put the focus on how inferior women were treated in comparison to men. The discrepancy can be seen in both of her works. "The Natural Daughter" can be seen as an autobiography of Mary Robinson. The characters are in many ways patterns of her own life and the stages of her life. All the characters are symbols of her own coming of age or people she met in her life.

=== Poetry ===
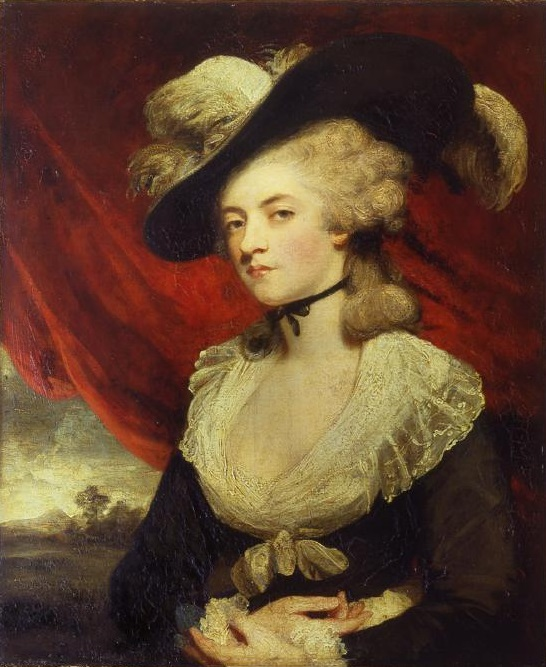
Perdita, portrait by Sir Joshua Reynolds, 1782

From the late 1780s, Robinson, striving to separate herself from her past scandals, and her life as a theatre actress, turned to writing as a full-time career. Robinson, disregarding her previous associations with the nickname "Perdita", meaning "lost one", soon became distinguished for her poetry and was reclassified as "the English Sappho" by the English public. During her 25-year writing career, from 1775 until her premature death in 1800, Robinson produced an immense body of work. In addition to eight collections of poems, Robinson wrote eight novels, three plays, several feminist treatises, and an autobiographical manuscript that was left incomplete at the time of her death.

Poems by Mrs. Robinson was published by C. Parker, in London, in 1775. Poems consisted of "twenty-six ballads, odes, and elegies" that "echo traditional values, praising values such as charity, sincerity, and innocence, particularly in a woman". Robinson's husband, Thomas Robinson, was imprisoned at the Fleet Prison for fifteen months for the gambling debts he had acquired. Robinson originally intended for the profits made from this collection to help pay off those debts. But the publication of Poems could not prevent his imprisonment. Robinson lived for nine months and three weeks with Thomas and their baby within the squalor of prison.

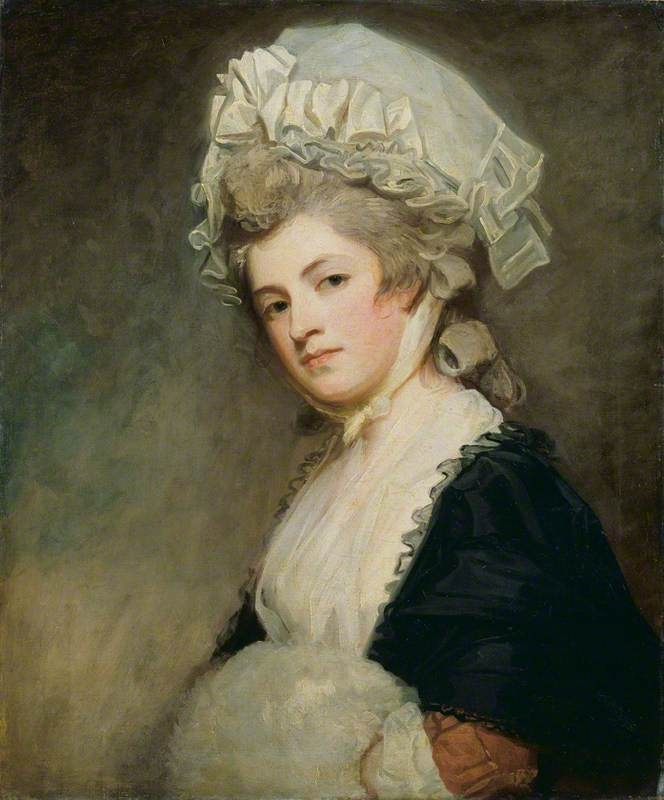
Portrait by George Romney, c. 1782

Motivated by the months she spent in prison, Robinson wrote Captivity; a Poem and Celadon and Lydia, a Tale, published by T. Becket in London, in 1777. This collection "described the horrors of captivity and painted a sympathetic picture of the 'wretch' and the 'guiltless partners of his poignant woes'...The poem ends admonishing people to open their hearts and to pity the unfortunate..."

Following the publication of Captivity, Robinson established a new poetic identity for herself. She let go of her Della Cruscan style when she wrote Poems by Mary Robinson, published in 1791 by J. Bell in London, and Poems by Mrs. Robinson, published in 1793 by T. Spilsbury in London. A review published in the Gentleman's Magazine stated that if Robinson had been less blessed with "beauty and captivating manners","her poetical taste might have been confined in its influence". The reviewer went on to describe her poetry as "elegant and harmonious".

In 1795, Robinson wrote a satirical poem titled London's Summer Morning, but it was not published until after her death in 1800. This poem showcased Robinson's critical perspective of the infrastructure and society of London. She described the busy and loud sounds of the industrialised city in the morning. She employed characters such as the chimney-boy, and ruddy housemaid to make a heavy critique on the way English society treated children as both innocent and fragile creatures.

In 1796, Robinson argued for women's rationality, their right to education and illustrated ideas of free will, suicide, rationalisation, empiricism and relationship to sensibility in Sappho and Phaon: In a Series of Legitimate Sonnets.

During the 1790s, Robinson was highly inspired by feminism and desired to spread her liberal sentiments through her writing. She was an ardent admirer of Mary Wollstonecraft, an established and influential feminist writer of the period. But to Robinson's surprise, her intense feelings were not reciprocated by Wollstonecraft. While Robinson expected a strong friendship between the two of them to flourish, Wollstonecraft "found Robinson herself considerably less appealing than the title character of Angelina". In 1796, Wollstonecraft wrote an extremely harsh review of Robinson's work in the Analytical Review. It was this critique that was not critical, or well thought out. Instead, Wollstonecraft's review of Robinson proved to be relatively shallow and pointed at her jealousy of Robinson's comparable freedom. Wollstonecraft had the potential to spend more of her own time writing, instead of having to entertain her husband, William Godwin. In Robinson's "Letter to the Women of England against Mental Subordination," Robinson reiterates the rights women have to live by sexual passion and the rights women are inherently given as equals to men.

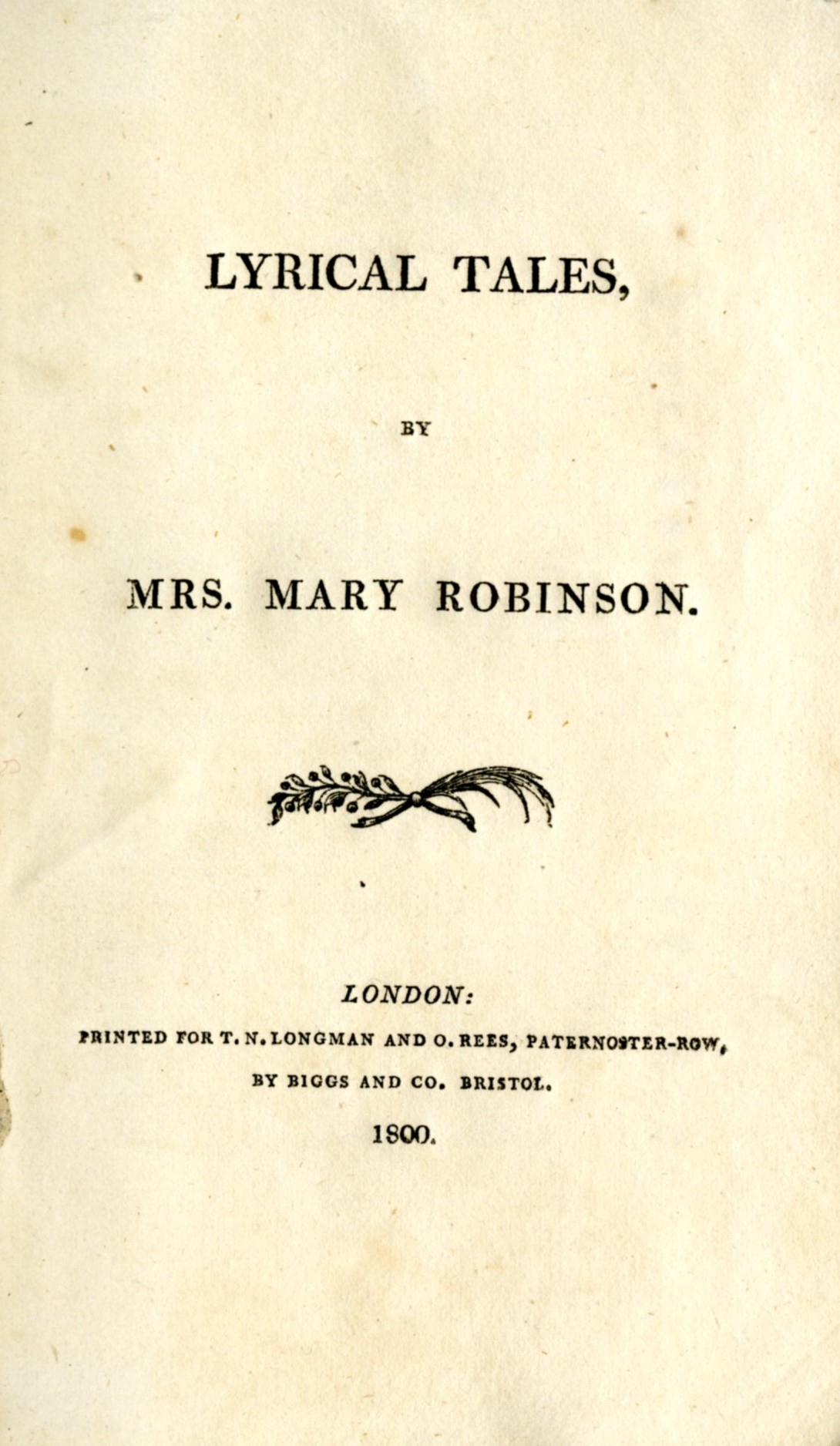
Title page of Lyrical Tales

Lastly, in 1800, after years of failing health and decline into financial ruin, Robinson wrote her last piece of literature during her lifetime: a series of poems titled the Lyrical Tales, published by Longman & Rees, in London. This poetry collection explored themes of domestic violence, misogyny, violence against destitute characters, and political oppression. "Robinson's last work pleads for a recognition of the moral and rational worth of women: 'Let me ask this plain and rational question-- is not woman a human being, gifted with all the feelings that inhabit the bosom of man?" Robinson's main objective was to respond to Lyrical Ballads written by authors Wordsworth and Coleridge; who were not as well known at the time. Although it was not as highly praised as Mary Wollstonecraft's "A Vindication of the Rights of Woman", published in 1792, Lyrical Tales provides a "powerful critique of the division of duties and privileges between the sexes. It places Robinson firmly on the side of the 'feminist' thinkers or 'modern' philosophers of the 1790s, as one of the strong defenders of her sex".

== Criticism and reception ==
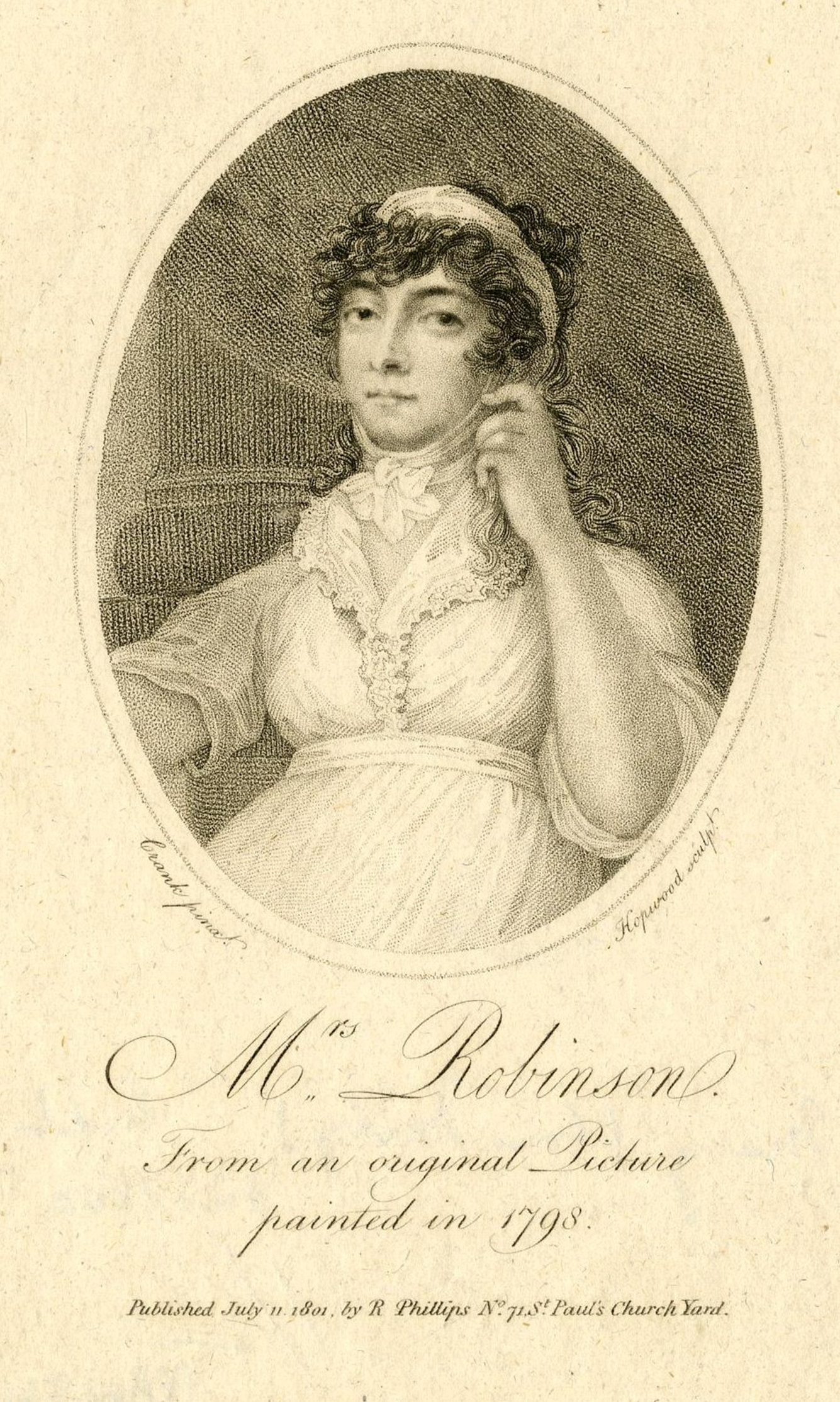
Print by James Hopwood the Elder, 1798

Robinson was known as a sexualised celebrity, but she was a very talented writer. Robinson did not receive recognition for her work until much later because of "strict attitudes led to a rejection of the literary work of such a notorious woman." She became a lesson to young girls about the dangers of promiscuity and a hedonistic lifestyle. She was named by her friend Samuel Taylor Coleridge "as a woman of undoubted genius." The collection of Poems published in 1791 had a "subscription list of 600 people was headed by His Royal Highness, George, Prince of Wales, and included many other members of the nobility. Some people subscribed because of her writing, some because of her notoriety, and some perhaps out of pity for the former actress, now crippled and ill. Reviews were generally kind, and noted traces in her poems of a sensibility that would later be termed Romanticism." in 1824, more than twenty years after her death, the Poetical Works of The Late Mrs. Robinson was published, which speaks to her ongoing popularity. Robinson's second novel The Widow, and her controversial comedy Nobody: A Comedy in Two Acts, both offended fashionable women, according to newspaper reports. Needless to say, Robinson's playwright career was short-lived after all the bad reviews of her work. The upper class interpreted her satire as mockery on female gambling and as an attack on moral legitimacy of the Whig elite. This interpretation of Nobody reveals a great deal about the social and political anxieties during the Revolutionary Era.

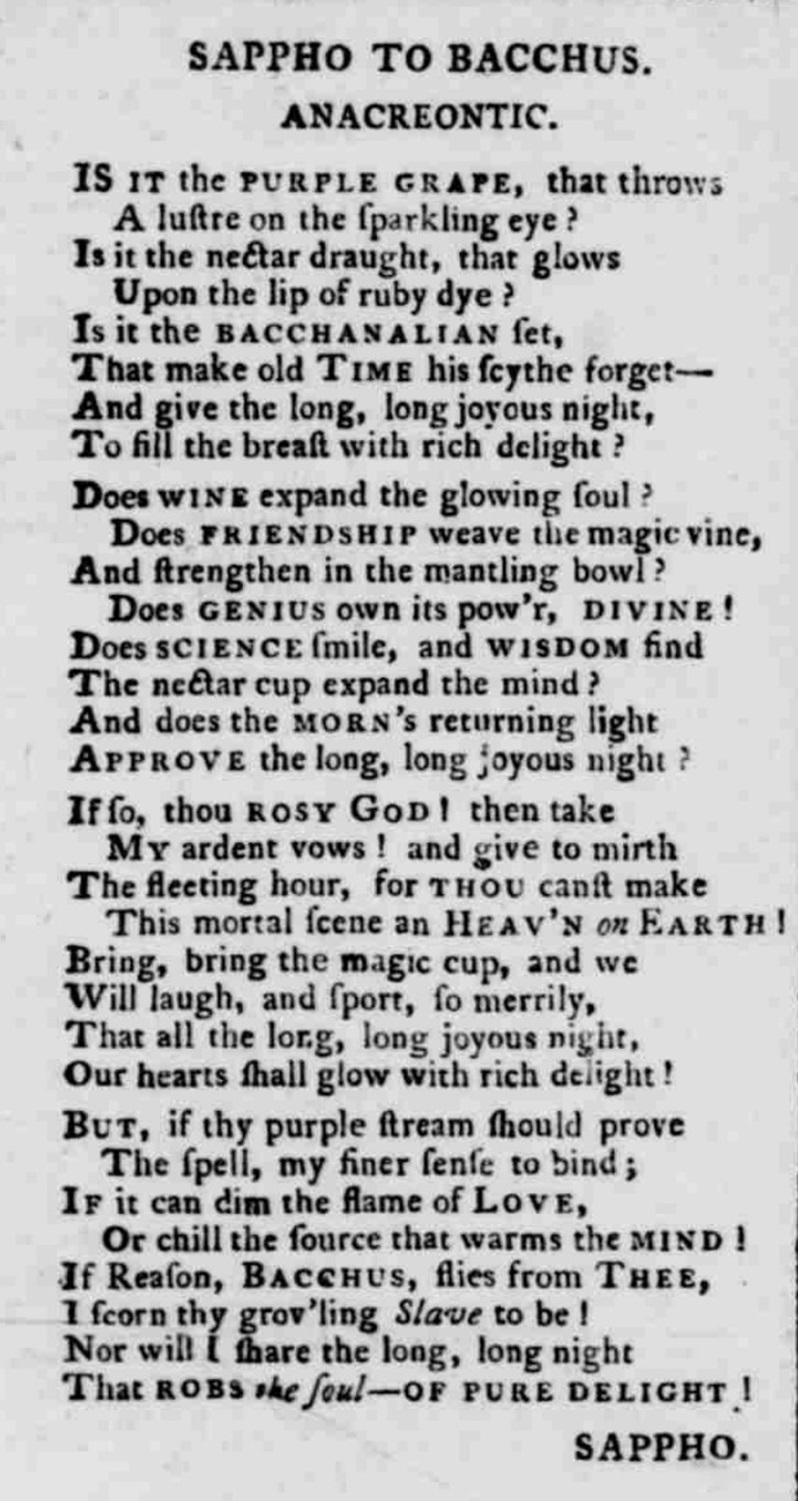
Poem published in the Staffordshire Advertiser in 1800

Robinson's poems were popular, especially after she produced a variety of poems whilst working at the newspaper The Morning Post. She replaced the poet Robert Southey as chief poetic correspondent and contributor for The Morning Post in December 1799, a position she maintained until November 1800, a month before her death. Most of her poetry in newspapers were published utilizing various pseudonyms, such as "Laura", "Laura Maria", "Oberon", "Sappho", "Julia", "Lesbia", "Portia", "Bridget", and "Tabitha Bramble". The poetry columns had a double agenda of pleasing a substantial and diverse audience and shaping them into a select group of elite readers eager to buy and consume books. The public adored the novel Vancenza; or The Dangers of Credulity, but the critical reception was mixed. Furthermore, a biographer Paula Byrne recently dismissed it as a "product of the vogue for Gothic fiction [that] now seems overblown to the point of absurdity." Although Robinson's poetry was more popular than her other works, the most lucrative "was her prose. The money helped to support herself, her mother and daughter, and often Banastre Tarleton. Novels such as Vancenza (1792), The Widow (1794), Angelina (1796) and Walsingham (1797) went through multiple editions and were often translated into French and German. They owed part of their popularity to their suspected autobiographical elements. Even when her characters were placed in scenes of gothic horror, their views could be related to the experiences of their author."

Mary Robinson was one of the first female celebrities of the modern era. She was dubbed as scandalous, but on the other hand educated and able to be partially independent from her husband. She was one of the first women to enter the sphere of writing, and to be successful there. Scholars often argue that she used her celebrity status only to her own advantage, but some argue that she contributed notably to the awareness of early feminism. She tried to elaborate the ideas of equality for women in England during the late 18th century. Nevertheless, many contemporary women were not amused with how she exposed herself to the public and ostracised her. They did not want to be associated with her, since they feared to receive a bad reputation sympathising with Mary Robinson.

== Works ==
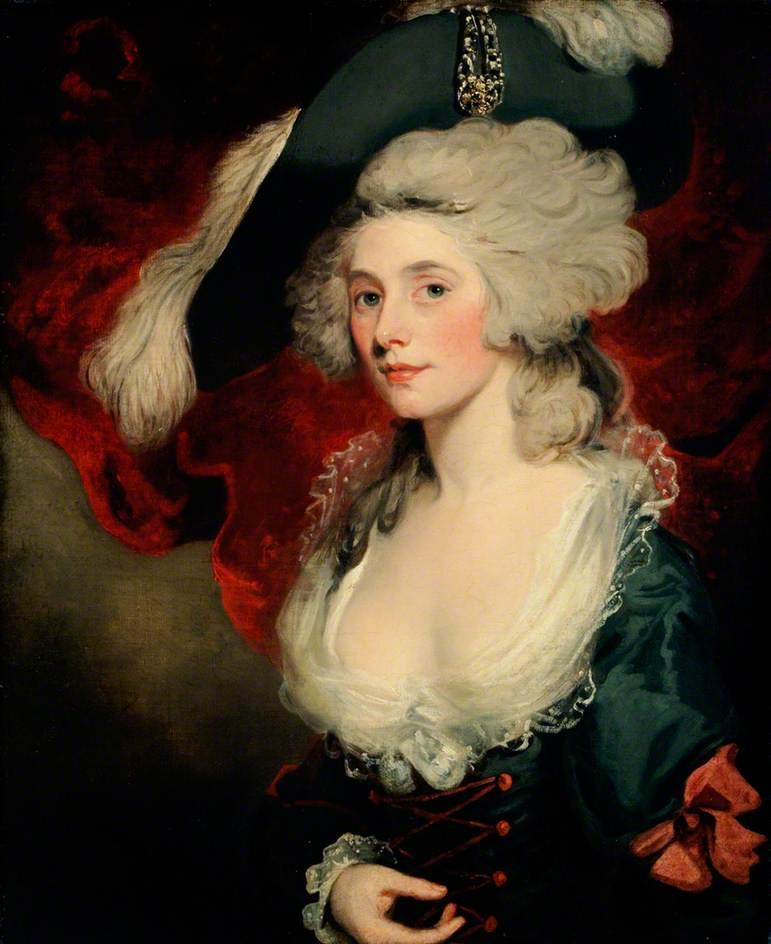
As Perdita, attributed to John Hoppner

=== Poetry ===
- Poems by Mrs. Robinson (London: C. Parker, 1775) Digital Edition
- Captivity, a Poem and Celadon and Lydia, a Tale. Dedicated, by Permission, to Her Grace the Duchess of Devonshire. (London: T. Becket, 1777)
- Ainsi va le Monde, a Poem. Inscribed to Robert Merry, Esq. A.M. [Laura Maria] (London: John Bell, 1790) Digital Edition
- Poems by Mrs. M. Robinson (London: J. Bell, 1791) Digital Edition
- The Beauties of Mrs. Robinson (London: H. D. Symonds, 1791)
- Monody to the Memory of Sir Joshua Reynolds, Late President of the Royal Academy, &c. &c. &c. (London: J. Bell, 1792)
- Ode to the Harp of the Late Accomplished and Amiable Louisa Hanway (London: John Bell, 1793)
- Modern Manners, a Poem. In Two Cantos. By Horace Juvenal (London: Printed for the Author, 1793)
- Sight, the Cavern of Woe, and Solitude. Poems (London: T. Spilsbury and Son, 1793)
- Monody to the Memory of the Late Queen of France (London: T. Spilsbury and Son, 1793)
- Poems by Mrs. M. Robinson. Volume the Second (London: T. Spilsbury and Son, 1793)
- Poems, by Mrs. Mary Robinson. A New Edition (London: T. Spilsbury, 1795)
- Sappho and Phaon. In a Series of Legitimate Sonnets, with Thoughts on Poetical Subjects, and Anecdotes of the Grecian Poetess (London: For the Author, 1796) Digital Edition
- Lyrical Tales, by Mrs. Mary Robinson (London: T. N. Longman and O. Rees, 1800) Digital Edition
- The Mistletoe. --- A Christmas Tale [Laura Maria] (London: Laurie & Whittle, 1800)

=== Novels ===
- Vancenza; or, the Dangers of Credulity (London: Printed for the Authoress, 1792)
- The Widow, or a Picture of Modern Times. A Novel, in a Series of Letters, in Two Volumes (London: Hookham and Carpenter, 1794)
- Angelina; a Novel, in Three Volumes (London: Printed for the Author, 1796)
- Hubert de Sevrac, a Romance, of the Eighteenth Century (London: Printed for the Author, 1796)
- Walsingham; or, the Pupil of Nature. A Domestic Story (London: T. N. Longman, 1797)
- The False Friend: a Domestic Story (London: T. N. Longman and O. Rees, 1799)
- Natural Daughter. With Portraits of the Leadenhead Family]. A Novel (London: T. N. Longman and O. Rees, 1799)

=== Dramas ===
- The Lucky Escape, A Comic Opera (performed on 23 April 1778 at the Theatre Royal, Drury Lane)
- The Songs, Chorusses, &c. in The Lucky Escape, a Comic Opera, as Performed at the Theatre-Royal, in Drury-Lane (London: Printed for the Author, 1778)
- Kate of Aberdeen (a comic opera withdrawn in 1793 and never staged)
- Nobody. A Comedy in Two Acts (performed on 27 November 1794 at the Theatre Royal, Drury Lane) Digital Edition
- The Sicilian Lover. A Tragedy. In Five Acts (London: Printed for the Author, 1796)

=== Political treatises ===
- Impartial Reflections on the Present Situation of the Queen of France; by A Friend to Humanity (London: John Bell, 1791)
- A Letter to the Women of England, on the Injustice of Mental Subordination. With Anecdotes. By Anne Frances Randall] (London: T. N. Longman and O. Rees, 1799) Digital Edition
- Thoughts on the Condition of Women, and on the Injustice of Mental Subordination (London: T. N. Longman and O. Rees, 1799)

=== Essays ===
- "The Sylphid. No. I", Morning Post and Gazetteer, 29 October 1799: 2 (also printed in Memoirs 3: 3–8)
- "The Sylphid. No. II", Morning Post and Gazetteer, 7 November 1799: 2 (also printed in Memoirs 3: 8–16)
- "The Sylphid. No. III", Morning Post and Gazetteer, 16 November 1799: 3 (also printed in Memoirs 3: 17–21)
- "The Sylphid. No. IV", Morning Post and Gazetteer, 23 November 1799: 2 (edited version printed in Memoirs 3: 21–26)
- "The Sylphid. No. V", Morning Post and Gazetteer, 27 November 1799: 2 (also printed in Memoirs 3: 27–31)
- "The Sylphid. No. VI", Morning Post and Gazetteer, 7 December 1799: 2 (edited version printed in Memoirs 3: 31–35)
- "The Sylphid. No. VII", Morning Post and Gazetteer, 19 December 1799: 2 (also printed in Memoirs 3: 35–40)
- "The Sylphid. No. VIII", Morning Post and Gazetteer, 24 December 1799: 2 (also printed in Memoirs 3: 41–45)
- "The Sylphid. No. IX", Morning Post and Gazetteer, 2 January 1800: 3 (also printed as No. XIV in Memoirs 3: 74–80)
- "To the Sylphid", Morning Post and Gazetteer, 4 January 1800: 3 (also printed as No. IX in Memoirs 3: 46–50)
- "The Sylphid. No. X", Morning Post and Gazetteer, 7 January 1800: 3 (also printed in Memoirs 3: 51–57)
- "The Sylphid. No. XI", Morning Post and Gazetteer, 11 January 1800: 2 (also printed in Memoirs 3: 58–63)
- "The Sylphid. No. XII", Morning Post and Gazetteer, 31 January 1800: 2 (edited version printed in Memoirs 3: 63–68)
- "The Sylphid. No. XIII", Memoirs 3: 68-73 (no extant copy of Morning Post exists)
- "Present State of the Manners, Society, &c. &c. of the Metropolis of England", Monthly Magazine, 10 (August 1800): 35–38.
- "Present State of the Manners, Society, &c. &c. of the Metropolis of England", Monthly Magazine, 10 (September 1800): 138–40
- "Present State of the Manners, Society, &c. &c. of the Metropolis of England", Monthly Magazine, 10 (October 1800): 218–22
- "Present State of the Manners, Society, &c. &c. of the Metropolis of England", Monthly Magazine, 10 (October 1800): 305–06

=== Translation ===
- Picture of Palermo by Dr. Hager translated from the German by Mrs. Mary Robinson (London: R. Phillips, 1800)

=== Biographical sketches ===
- "Anecdotes of Eminent Persons: Memoirs of the Late Duc de Biron", Monthly Magazine 9 (February 1800): 43–46
- "Anecdotes of Eminent Persons: Account of Rev. John Parkhurst", Monthly Magazine 9 (July 1800): 560–61
- "Anecdotes of Eminent Persons: Account of Bishop Parkhurst", Monthly Magazine 9 (July 1800): 561
- "Anecdotes of Eminent Persons: Additional Anecdotes of Philip Egalité Late Duke of Orleans", Monthly Magazine 10 (August 1800): 39–40
- "Anecdotes of Eminent Persons: Anecdotes of the Late Queen of France", Monthly Magazine 10 (August 1800): 40–41

=== Posthumous Publications ===
- "Mr. Robert Ker Porter". Public Characters of 1800–1801 (London: R. Phillips, 1801)
- Memoirs of the Late Mrs. Robinson, Written by Herself with Some Posthumous Pieces. In Four Volumes (London: R. Phillips, 1801)
- "Jasper. A Fragment", Memoirs of the Late Mrs. Robinson, Vol. 3 (London: R. Phillips, 1801)
- "The Savage of Aveyron", Memoirs of the Late Mrs. Robinson, Vol. 3 (London: R. Phillips, 1801)
- "The Progress of Liberty", Memoirs of the Late Mrs. Robinson, Vol. 4 (London: R. Phillips, 1801)
- The Poetical Works of the Late Mrs. Mary Robinson: Including Many Pieces Never Before Published. In Three Volumes (London: Richard Phillips, 1824)

== Publications about Robinson and her work ==
=== Biographies (ordered by date of publication) ===
- "A Tribute of Respect to the Memory of the Late Mrs. Robinson, in the Form of a Monumental Inscription". Weekly Entertainer 37 (June 1801): 517.
- "Mrs. Robinson". Public Characters of 1800–1801. London: R. Phillips, 1801. 327–37.
- Jones, Stephen. "Robinson (Mary)". A New Biographical Dictionary: Containing a Brief Account of the Life and Writings of the Most Eminent Persons and Remarkable Characters in Every Age and Nation. 5th ed. London: Longman, Hurst, Rees and Orne; J. Wallis; W. Peacock and Sons; J. Harris; Scatcherd and Letterman; Vernor and Hood; and J. Walker, 1805. N. pag.
- "Biographical Sketch of Mrs. Mary Robinson". The Hibernia Magazine, and Dublin Monthly Panorama 3 (1811): 25–28.
- Knight, John Joseph (1897). "Robinson, Mary" . In Lee, Sidney (ed.). Dictionary of National Biography. Vol. 49. London: Smith, Elder & Co.
- Craven, Mary. Famous Beauties of Two Reigns; Being an Account of Some Fair Women of Stuart & Georgian Times. London: E. Nash, 1906.
- Fyvie, John. Comedy Queens of the Georgian Era. New York: E.P. Dutton, 1907.
- Makower, Stanley. Perdita: A Romance in Biography. London: Hutchinson, 1908.
- Chisholm, Hugh, ed. (1911). "Robinson, Mary" . Encyclopædia Britannica. Vol. 23 (11th ed.). Cambridge University Press.
- Barrington, E. [Lily Adams Beck]. The Exquisite Perdita. New York: Dodd, Mead and Company, 1926.
- Benjamin, Lewis S. More Stage Favorites of the Eighteenth Century. Freeport, NY: Books for Libraries Press, Inc, 1929.
- Mendenhall, John C. "Mary Robinson (1757–1800)". University of Pennsylvania Library Chronicle 4 (1936): 2–10.
- Steen, Marguerite. The Lost One, a Biography of Mary (Perdita) Robinson. London: Methuen & Co., 1937.
- Bass, Robert D. The Green Dragoon: The Lives of Banastre Tarleton and Mary Robinson. New York: Henry Hold and Company, 1957.
- Ty, Eleanor. "Mary Robinson". In British Reform Writers, 1789–1832, edited by Gary Kelly, 297–305. Detroit: Thomson Gale, 1995.
- Levy, Martin J. "Mrs. Robinson". The Mistresses of King George IV. London: P. Owen, 1996. 13–43.
- Meyers, Kate Beaird. "Mary Darby Robinson ('Perdita')". An Encyclopedia of British Women Writers. Eds Paul and June Schleuter. Rev. and Expanded. New Brunswick: Rutgers UP, 1998. 391–92.
- Schlueter, Paul, and June Schlueter. "Mary Robinson". An Encyclopedia of British Women Writers. New Brunswick: Rutgers University Press, 1998.
- Pascoe, Judith, ed. "Introduction". Mary Robinson: Selected Poems. Peterborough, ON: Broadview Press, 2000.
- Binhammer, Katherine. "Mary Darby Robinson (1758–1800)". Female Spectator 4.3 (2000): 2–4.
- Byrne, Paula. Perdita: The Literary, Theatrical, and Scandalous Life of Mary Robinson. New York: Random House, 2004.
- Davenport, Hester. The Prince's Mistress: Perdita, a Life of Mary Robinson. Stroud: Sutton Publishing, 2004.
- Denlinger, Elizabeth Campbell. Before Victoria: Extraordinary Women of the British Romantic Era. New York: New York Public Library: Columbia University Press, 2005.
- Gristwood, Sarah. Perdita: Royal Mistress, Writer, Romantic. London: Bantam, 2005.
- Gristwood, Sarah. Bird of Paradise: The Colourful Career of the First Mrs Robinson. London: Bantam, 2007.
- Brewer, William D., ed. The Works of Mary Robinson. 8 vols. Pickering & Chatto, 2009–2010.
- Davenport, Hester, Ed. "'Sketch of Mrs Robinson's Life by Herself'". In The Works of Mary Robinson, edited by William D. Brewer, 7: 333–35. London: Pickering and Chatto, 2010.
- Perry, Gill, Joseph Roach, and Shearer West. "Mary Robinson: Born in 1757/8 – Died in 1800". In The First Actresses: Nell Gwyn to Sarah Siddons. Ann Arbor: University of Michigan Press, 2011. 55.
- Levy, Martin J. "Robinson, Mary [Perdita] (1756/1758?–1800)". Oxford Dictionary of National Biography (online ed.). Oxford University Press. doi:10.1093/ref:odnb/23857. (Subscription, Wikipedia Library access or UK public library membership required.)
- Robinson, Terry F. "Robinson (née Darby), Mary." In The Palgrave Encyclopedia of Romantic-Era Women's Writing, edited by Natasha Duquette. Palgrave Macmillan, 2024. 1-9.

=== Selected resources on Robinson and her work ===
- Barron, Phillip. "'Who Has Not Wak'd': Mary Robinson and Cartesian Poetry". Philosophy and Literature 41.2 (2017): 392–399.
- Brewer, William D., ed. The Works of Mary Robinson. 8 vols. Pickering & Chatto, 2009–2010.
- Cross, Ashley. Mary Robinson and the Genesis of Romanticism: Literary Dialogues and Debts, 1784–1821. London: Routledge, 2016.
- Freeman, Kathryn S. "Rethinking the Romantic Era--Androgynous Subjectivity and the Recreative in the Writings of Mary Robinson, Samuel Taylor Coleridge, and Mary Shelley". London: Bloomsbury Academic, 2021
- Gamer, Michael, and Terry F. Robinson. "Mary Robinson and the Dramatic Art of the Comeback". Studies in Romanticism 48.2 (Summer 2009): 219–256.
- Ledoux, Ellen Malenas. "Florizel and Perdita Affair, 1779–80". BRANCH: Britain, Representation and Nineteenth-Century History. Ed. Dino Franco Felluga. Extension of Romanticism and Victorianism on the Net. Web. 2 June 2013.
- Pascoe, Judith. Mary Robinson: Selected Poems. Peterborough, ON: Broadview Press, 1999.
- Robinson, Daniel. The Poetry of Mary Robinson: Form and Fame. New York: Palgrave Macmillan, 2011.
- Robinson, Terry F. "Introduction". Nobody. By Mary Robinson. Romantic Circles. Web. March 2013.
- Robinson, Terry F. "Becoming Somebody: Refashioning the Body Politic in Mary Robinson's Nobody." Studies in Romanticism 55 (Summer 2016): 143–184.

=== Fictional works about Robinson ===
- Plaidy, Jean. Perdita's Prince. 1969.
- Elyot, Amanda. All For Love: The Scandalous Life and Times of Royal Mistress Mary Robinson. A Novel. 2008.
- Lightfoot, Freda. Lady of Passion: The Story of Mary Robinson. 2013.
- Perdita is a play by Sophie Todd presented at The Old Red Lion Theatre, London, in 2026. The title comes from the character Perdita in The Winter's Tale, one of Robinson's early roles.
