= Hubert de Sevrac =

1796 novel by Mary Robinson

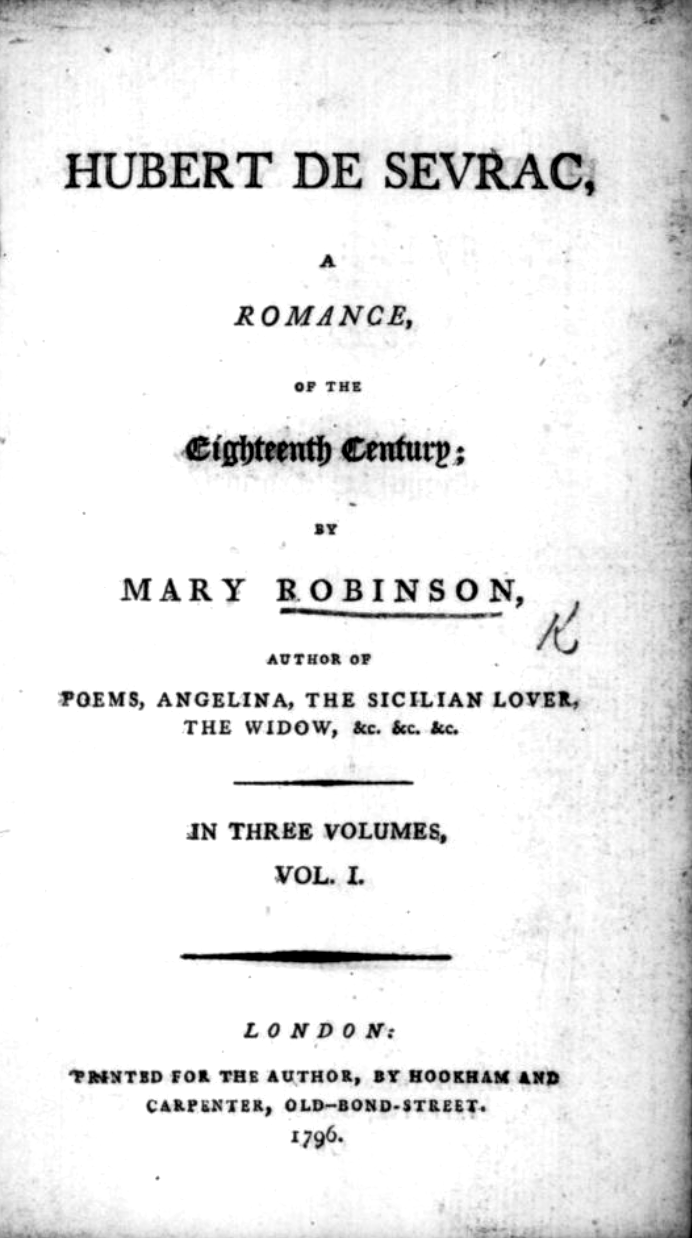
- Title page of first edition
- Author: Mary Robinson
- Genre: Gothic
- Publisher: T Hookham & Carpenter
- Publication date: 3 December 1796
- Publication place: United Kingdom
- Media type: Print
- OCLC: 7021553

Hubert de Sevrac, a Romance of the Eighteenth Century (1796) is a Gothic novel by the celebrity actress and poet Mary Robinson. Its protagonists are a fictional French aristocrat Hubert de Sevrac and his daughter Sabina, who experience a series of dramatic travails after fleeing the French Revolution. Murders, kidnappings, and mistaken identities form the background of Hubert's gradual acceptance of revolutionary ideals. Robinson uses the novel to advocate for egalitarian social reform, including legal rights for women and a rejection of duelling. Hubert de Sevrac was influenced by the Gothic novels of Ann Radcliffe, Charlotte Smith, and William Godwin, but it was not as well received and marked the beginning of Robinson's decline in popularity as a novelist.

== Background ==
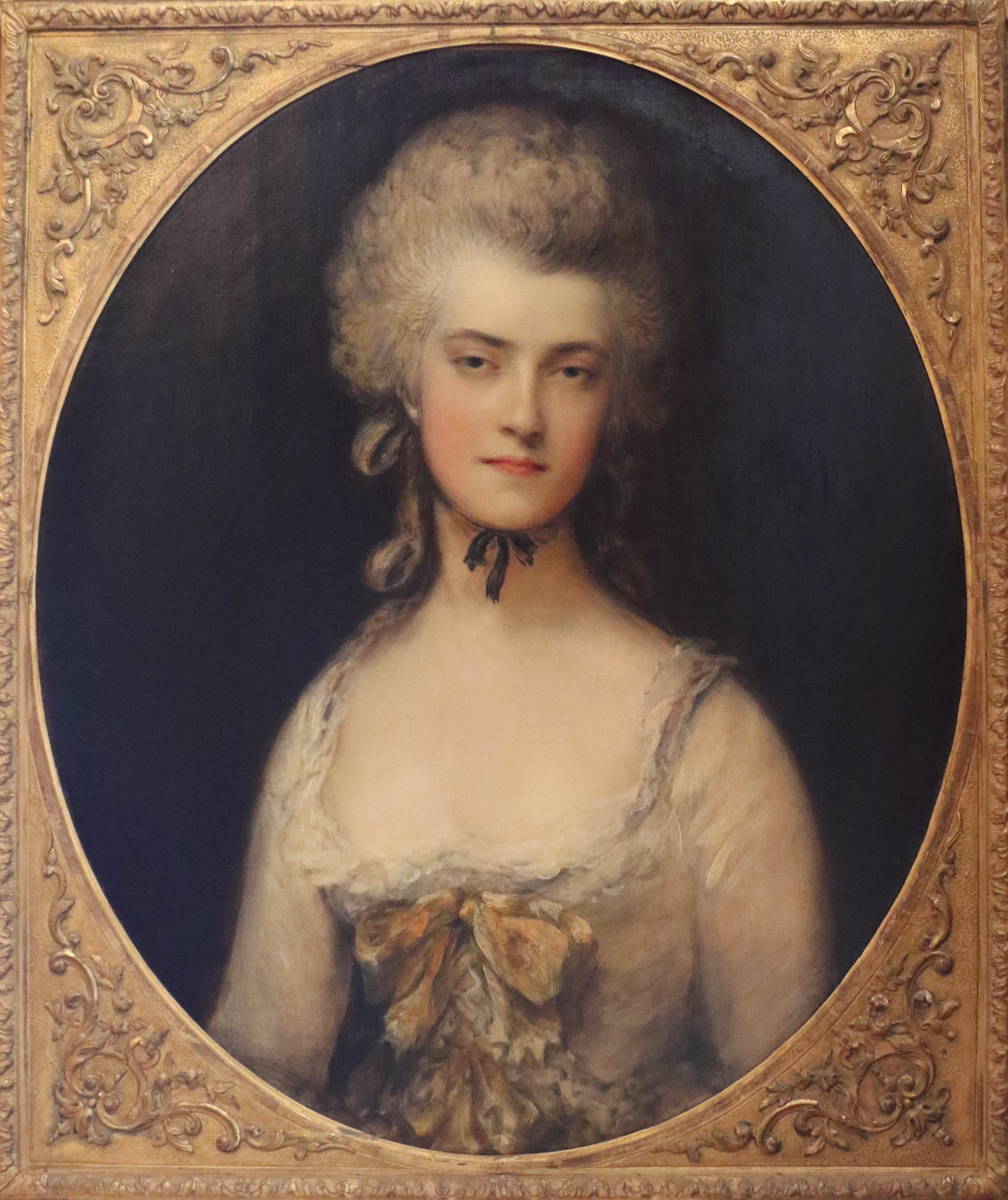
Mary Robinson, portrayed by Thomas Gainsborough in 1781. Robinson was initially a celebrity as an actress and a famous mistress of the Prince of Wales, but began supporting herself as a writer in 1788.

Robinson began a prolific writing career in 1788, as a new source of money and fame after the conclusion of her notorious affairs with the Prince of Wales and Banastre Tarleton. She was a successful poet before she began writing novels. Her first novel, Vancenza; or, the Dangers of Credulity (1792), was also successful. Like Hubert de Sevrac, it used the slightly scandalous genre of the Gothic and promoted egalitarian social views. Hubert de Sevrac was Robinson's fourth novel (following Vancenza, The Widow (1794), and Angelina (1796)), and her second Gothic novel.

== Synopsis ==
The novel opens with Hubert de Sevrac, a French aristocrat, fleeing Paris in the summer of 1792 with his wife and daughter. Their antagonist is Monsieur Ravillon, a gamekeeper's son. Hubert's father, the Marquis de Sevrac, murdered Ravillon's father and named Ravillon his heir out of guilt. Ravillon then murdered the Marquis to inherit. As a stipulation of the Marquis' will, Ravillon's own heir must be Hubert's daughter Sabina. Hubert refuses to marry Sabina to Ravillon's son Arnaud (Ravillon's scheme to keep the de Sevrac fortune in his family), so Ravillon instigates a duel. Ravillon stabs an English tourist by mistake instead, fakes his own death, and frames Hubert. Ravillon kidnaps Sabina to a castle, where he tries to bully her into marrying Arnaud. Hubert is narrowly saved from execution for Ravillon's (false) murder thanks to the arrival of the also not-murdered English tourist, Edmund St. Clair.

Hubert goes temporarily insane after being unable to respond to an insult with a duel. He writes sentimental poetry, and feels better. A malicious priest, the Abbot Palerma, preys on Sabina's trust, and she narrowly avoids kidnappings and rapes. Eventually, Sabina is able to resist the Abbot through rational philosophy and good advice from her sensible mother. Hubert tries to find employment under the false name D'Angerville, but ineffectively, as he spends too much time reading poetry. He also befriends the peasant Giovanni, who expands his political worldview.

Sabina falls in love with Edmund St. Clair, who does not tell her he is already married. Paulina Montoni, the daughter of a local Count, falls in love with Hubert, who also does not disclose that he is married. Ravillon forces Paulina to marry him; imprisoned in his castle, she goes insane, but is rescued by Hubert. Ravillon flees, using a stolen family heirloom to impersonate Hubert. This identity theft leads to his death, as Ravillon is murdered by a Frenchman who mistakenly believes Hubert is responsible for the crimes of the cruel Count de Briancour. (Briancour is a friend of Ravillon's, who imprisoned the man's father in the Bastille, and extorted sex from the man's sister for their father's release.) Rather than reclaim his inheritance after Ravillon's death, Hubert moves the family to England, where they can live on his wife's recent inheritance from her mother. Sabina marries a newly widowed St. Clair, and the de Sevrac family name comes to an end.

== Major themes ==
=== French revolutionary ideals ===
Hubert de Sevrac is a strongly pro-revolutionary novel, taking radical stances at a time when the French Revolution was increasingly disapproved of in England. The de Sevrac family are the praiseworthy figures through which Robinson promotes her own views. Hubert concludes that his former life as an aristocrat made him comfortable at the expense of others' suffering; his daughter, Sabina, discovers that she has been overly trusting of her Catholic confessor, exposing her predilection toward irrational superstition. Together, they gradually reform their assumptions about the world, reject their prior cultural values, and adopt new identities. The culmination of the novel's bildungsroman is Hubert de Sevrac's rejection of the elitist ancien régime and his embrace of virtuous family life as an expatriate.

The novel also rejects the ideology of chivalry, especially the violence of duelling. In influential conservative writing by Edmund Burke, French revolutionaries were criticized for their betrayal of chivalric honour. Robinson herself also promoted the value of chivalry in her 1791 pamphlet Impartial Reflections on the Present Situation of the Queen of France, in which she urged revolutionaries to protect Marie Antionette. However, Hubert de Sevrac post-dates the 1793 execution of Marie Antoinette, and in the novel Robinson now critiques chivalry by presenting it as primarily a form of one-upmanship between men, which fails to accomplish its claimed social protection of vulnerable women. She characterizes chivalric honour as a dangerous, irrational, and archaic motive for violence. Instead, Robinson promotes a sentimental heroic ideal, epitomized by Ossian, and encourages a bipartisan rejection of violence for any reason.

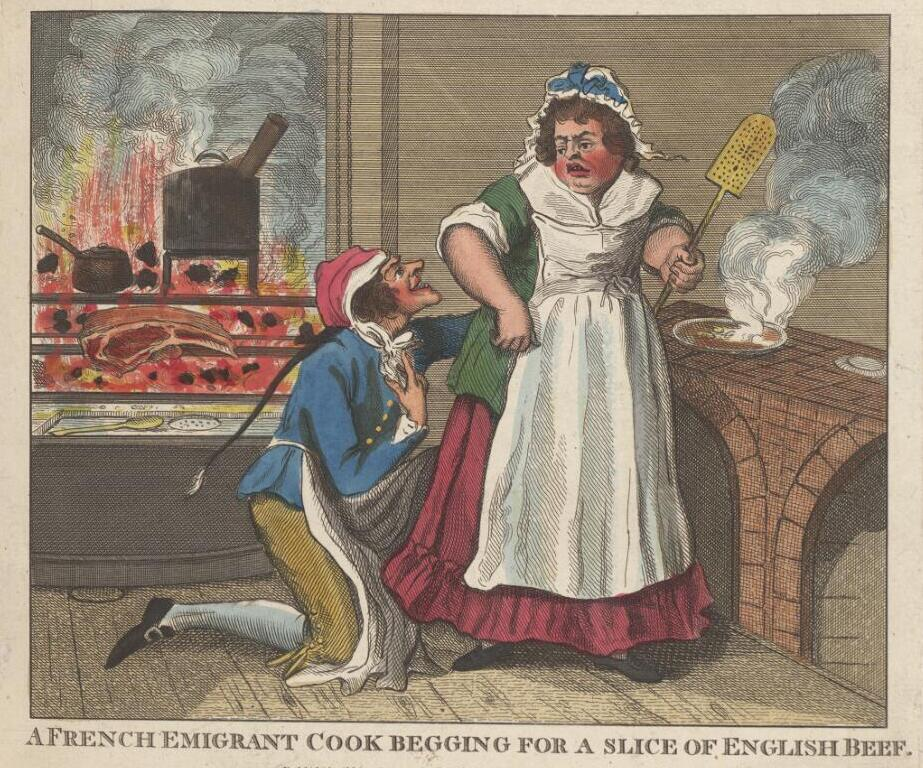
British attitudes were often cruel toward French refugees, as in this 1784 political cartoon depicting an emigrant as a beggar. Hugo de Sevrac presents the French more sympathetically.

=== Sympathy for exile ===
A key preoccupation of the novel is the emotional and physical difficulty of political exile. In the 1790s, many French people fled the country; these refugees were often met with hostility or at least scepticism in England, due to a long history of military conflict and religious difference between England and France. Robinson instead invites sympathy for French émigrés through emotional scenes of their suffering, and through villainization of Hubert's opponents. Robinson further extends the political implications of sympathy to a proto-feminist argument: she compares the situation of émigrés to the disenfranchisement of women in Britain, and critiques the emotional suffering and isolation that women experience when they are treated like property in marriage.

=== Female independence ===
The character of Sabina defies several of the conventional tropes of a Gothic heroine, promoting an ideal of womanhood that values intellectual independence over modest submission. The influential Gothic novels of Ann Radcliffe often focus on a central conflict between fathers and daughters, in which daughters must learn to be obedient to their fathers. In contrast, Sabina challenges her father's authority by confronting him for his failings and making her own choice of whom to marry. Even more unusually for a Gothic novel, Sabina is mentored throughout the novel by her mother, who lives to the end of the book. Sabina's mother, Emily, has already survived travails appropriate to a Gothic heroine, such as being rejected by her husband's family. Emily draws on her experience with the world, and especially with untrustworthy men, to help Sabina escape sexually-threatening situations that other Gothic novels would conventionally resolve through lucky coincidences. Emily also provides the financial resources for the family's happy ending living in England. Together, the characters of Sabina and Emily exemplify heroines who are praiseworthy for their intelligence and their independence.

== Style ==
The novel's writing style keeps revolutionary violence at a distance. The novel opens with the de Sevrac family forced to flee Paris, which could be in response to the Insurrection of 10 August 1792 or the subsequent September Massacres, but the inciting event is never specified. Instead, Robinson describes the French Revolution with metaphors of torrential rain and thunderstorms; the literary scholar William D. Brewer highlights that these metaphor liken the revolution to a natural event that can have a cleansing effect.

More broadly, the novel's use of Gothic horror is impressionistic, rather than graphically violent. As such, it belongs to the "terror" school of the Gothic (typified by Ann Radcliffe) rather than the "horror" school (typified by Matthew Lewis's The Monk). Other Gothic features of the text include its plot points around religious corruption and mistaken identity. As a genre, the Gothic was considered both vulgar and morally suspect for cultivating a taste for violence. Anna Laetitia Barbauld, for example, complained about the popularity of fiction featuring "ghosts and goblins, or murders, earthquakes, fires, shipwrecks, and all the most terrible disasters attending human life". Robinson's use of the genre has been seen both as commercially motivated pandering, and as a literary intervention attempting to increase the reputation of the Gothic.

== Influences ==
The plot of Hubert de Sevrac mirrors that of Ann Radcliffe's The Mysteries of Udolpho (1794). It is also influenced by Charlotte Smith's Desmond, A Novel (1792) and William Godwin's Caleb Williams (1794), which both employ Gothic tropes in a contemporary setting to present pro-revolutionary political views. Desmond and Hubert de Sevrac also share the plot structure of a French aristocratic protagonist who comes to support the ideals of the revolution. The focus on French émigrés further links Hubert to Smith's poem The Emigrants (1793).

Politically, Robinson uses the novel to reject Edmund Burke's Reflections on the Revolution in France (1790) and to support William Godwin's Enquiry Concerning Political Justice (1793). Hubert also quotes from Edward Gibbon's The History of the Decline and Fall of the Roman Empire (1776–88), specifically endorsing its scepticism of institutional Christianity.

== Publication ==
Hubert de Sevrac was published in three volumes in November 1796 printed by Hookham and Carpenter, followed by a two-volume Dublin edition in 1797 printed by B. Smith, C. Browne, and H. Colbert. Both were "printed for the author," a form of self-publishing in which Robinson did not sell her copyright to a publishing company. A French edition was also published in 1797 by Théophile-Étienne Gide, translated by André-Samuel-Michel Cantwell.

== Reception ==
The scholar Anne Close describes Hugo de Sevrac as "one of Robinson's most self-conscious attempts to earn money by satisfying readers' appetites for Gothic fiction". However, it was not successful. When first published, Hubert de Sevrac was reviewed by the Analytical Review, the Monthly Review, the European Magazine, and the Critical Review (where the review was written by Samuel Taylor Coleridge). The reviewers compared the novel unfavorably to the works of Ann Radcliffe and to Robinson's other writing. These reviews did not discuss the novel's political themes or its connection to real-life events, implicitly dismissing it as an unrealistic fantasy despite its contemporary setting. A review of the French edition in the Journal typographique was more positive. The lukewarm reception of Hugo de Sevrac was the beginning of Robinson's decline in popularity as a novelist. Today, Hubert de Sevrac is rarely studied in-depth, like Robinson's other Gothic novels.
