= Natural Daughter with Portraits of the Leadenhead Family =

1799 novel by Mary Robinson

The Natural Daughter
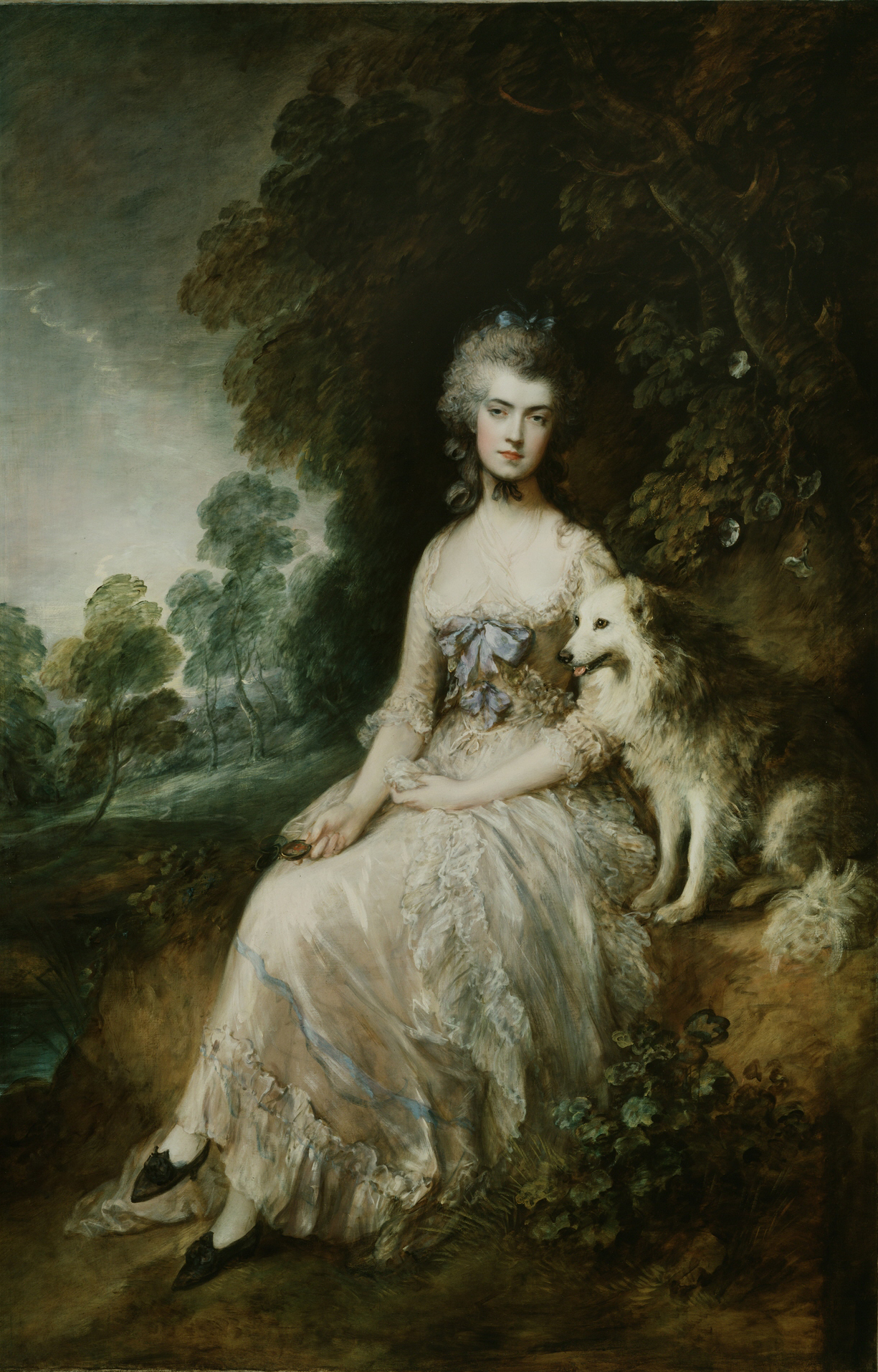
- Portrait of Mary Robinson by Thomas Gainsborough, 1781
- Author: Mary Robinson
- Original title: The Natural Daughter with Portraits of the Leadenhead Family
- Language: English
- Genre: Fiction
- Published: London, England
- Publisher: T. N. Longman and O. Rees
- Publication date: 1799
- Publication place: England
- Media type: Print
- ISBN: 1551112361

The Natural Daughter with Portraits of the Leadenhead Family is a novel by the English poet, dramatist and novelist Mary Robinson, published in 1799 by T. N. Longman and O. Rees in Paternoster Row in London. The novel was originally published as two volumes; a thousand copies were printed for the first edition of the novel. All the copies sold out quickly, leading to the book's second publication in the same year. This romantic prose narrative is often thought to be Robinson's commentary on the French Revolution and the ideals of the English woman, due to the various characters influenced by France and the members of the revolution who appear in the novel.

== Plot ==
Robinson's narrative begins with the Bradford family travelling to Bath for the sake of its healing waters. The Bradfords are a mixed bunch in terms of personality and beliefs. Peregrine Bradford, his wife and two daughters, Martha and Julia, are members of the middle-class who have recently built their fortune, however, they do not have official titles to secure their place among high society. Mr Bradford believes that his wealth will buy everything he desires when he says, “gold will buy everything; and who knows but I may soon die and leave a title?” The idea that money can buy happiness is a consistent theme throughout the novel. The main character, Martha (Bradford) Morley, continually seeks to dispute this idea by showing compassion towards others and straying from the path that will lead her to upper-class society. Martha is portrayed as a more masculine woman who takes action, while her sister Julia is passive and full of sensibility, i.e. an emotional delicacy and extreme feeling.

Martha's marriage to Mr Morley goes against the less submissive identity that she is described as possessing. Early in the novel, Martha is described as, “giddy, wild, buxom, good-natured, and bluntly sincere tenor of her conversation” and “a mere masculine hoyden.” Martha is willing to submit to marriage for the sake of her father, but the marriage is not happy. Mr Morley is described as, “one of those prejudiced mortals who consider women as beings created for the conveniences of domestic life”. Not long into the marriage, Mr Morley leaves on business, which meant his estate was left to be run by Martha. On her own, Martha gets to know the locals in the village outside the estate. On one of her excursions, she discovers a highborn lady and her newborn illegitimate child. Martha offers to assist the young mother but is suddenly struck ill and cannot go to the village herself, so in her place, she sends a servant named Mrs Grimwood. Mrs Grimwood's discovery of the child and its connection to Martha lead her to create false rumours which are spread as the chapter ends. The narrator foreshadows the worst for Martha by saying, “little foreseeing that her steps would lead to a labyrinth of adventures”

Martha's decision to care for the illegitimate child, whom she calls Frances or Fanny, instigates a scandalous rumour that Martha is the real mother of the child. Her husband, Mr Morley, goes as far as placing her out of doors where she has to fend for herself. Without the means to support herself, Fanny is placed in the care of Lord Francis Sherville, whom Martha assumes is Fanny's father. At the same time, Martha's sister Julia is beginning to step beyond the bounds of the ideal English woman's sensibility. As a woman who has been introduced to higher society, Julia is influenced by her peers and the raging French Revolution. Under this influence, Julia takes a number of lovers including Mr Morley, Sir Lionel Beacon, and the notorious Robespierre. She eventually marries Gregory Leadenhead despite her reputation as a loose woman. The two or soon divorced after her affair with Mr Morley.

The Leadenhead family is a rambunctious cast of characters who have risen to high society through new money. However, their middle-class background prevents them from fully entering the world of the upper-class. Many members of the upper-class, such as Sir Lionel Beacon and Lady Penelope Pryer, come from old, inherited money that has never had to be earned. Their old-money background also provides them with titles of honour such as "Sir" and "Lady." The Leadenheads lack a title so they decide to send their son into the army in order to earn a title of military prestige. Gregory Leadenhead eventually marries and divorces Julia Bradford due to her unwomanly behaviour.

Being cast out of doors, Martha seeks to support herself as an independent woman. This is more difficult than it seems and it is near impossible for Martha to pay her rent. Luckily, she comes across Fanny's mother, "a provincial actress of the most promising talents," at an inn. Mrs Sedgley is overjoyed to see Martha and to hear that her daughter is in the care of Lord Francis Sherville. Martha asks Mrs Sedgley if she may join the acting troupe and is eagerly accepted into the group. As an actress, Martha could have both fame and independence. During her career as an actress, she learns that Mrs Sedgley was in France during the first years of the revolution where she spent months in a French prison waiting to be executed by the infamous Marat. Before Mrs Sedgley's name is called for the guillotine, Marat harasses Mrs Sedgley. Luckily, Mrs Sedgley was able to escape the prison and return to London. Not long after, she gave birth to little Fanny.

Martha's first performance as an actress is when she is cast as Lady Teazle. Despite her success as this character, "Mrs Morley was neither elated nor changed by the fame which rapidly followed her footsteps". As an actress, Martha or Mrs Morley was able to find freedom where she had previously been limited by her marriage to Mr Morley. Unfortunately, all good things have to come to an end. Mr Morley eventually runs into Mrs Morley while she is travelling with her fellow actors and he is appalled by her choice of employment and proceeds to lecture Martha about the roles that a proper wife should have taken on despite being abandoned. Martha, however, proceeds to defend herself by explaining the necessity of her situation. This confrontation causes Martha to leave the acting troupe and move on to another profession that is arguably less public.

Once again on her own, Martha has to find a new way to earn a living wage. Upon returning to London, she takes up what she calls a "modern experiment" or the writing of a novel. Previously, throughout the book, Martha's character has written poetry about what she has observed. Now, she is attempting to write a novel which is difficult to gain a profit from even though the literary marketplace is booming. In just six weeks, Martha writes her novel and takes her manuscript to be printed in Bond Street. There Martha meets a bookseller named Mr Index. He promptly informs her that her novel is too common and will not sell successfully. In order to be successful, Mr Index says that a novel should be a satire or a portrait of real life to be successful. Despite being disheartened by Mr Index's criticism of her novel, Martha sells him the copyright to her novel for 10 pounds. After the sale, Martha continues to write, but instead of a novel, she seeks to publish a book of poetry. To gain a sponsor for this collection, Martha writes a dedication to Lady Eldercourt. Unfortunately, this Lady does not see the sophistication in Martha's poetry and offers her only five guineas for her troubles. Martha faints and is forced to re-evaluate how she is to publish her poetry. During this pursuit, Martha discovers that her novel has been printed in six editions when the purchaser only gave her ten pounds for her manuscript. Her anger at this betrayal by the publisher is mistaken for madness, and Martha is taken to a mad-house where she discovers her mother, Mrs Bradford. Together they escape the asylum during a fire.

The end of Robinson's novel is a whirlwind of plot twists that dramatically change the reader's perceptions of many of the main characters. When Martha travels to France, she finds her sister dead in the Hotel de la Liberté after Julia announces her love affair with the notorious Robespierre. Right before Julia's death, Robespierre is led to the guillotine. This shocking revelation stuns Martha and Mr Morley. In the end, Mr Morley is revealed to be the father of little Fanny and to "preserve" his own reputation as a pious man, attempts to kill the child. He is stopped by Martha, Mrs Sedgley and Lord Francis Sherville. Upon seeing Mrs Sedgley, Lord Francis recognizes her as his sister, which would make Fanny his niece. Mr. Morley falls to his death while fighting over Fanny. After the fight, Lord Francis proposes to Martha and she accepts his offer of marriage.

The final paragraph of the novel ends with the narrator informing the reader of the whereabouts of Lady Penelope Pryer and her engagement to Gregory Leadenhead.

== Characters ==
- Martha Bradford or Mrs. Morley: The more masculine daughter of Mr. Peregrine Bradford and Mrs. Bradford, Martha has a kind heart and is reasonable. She marries Mr. Morley who expects her to be an idyllic wife who is faithful and obedient. Martha adopts the illegitimate child, Fanny, which results in her being placed out of doors by her husband. Independently, Martha goes on to pursue a career as an actress and as a writer. At the end of the novel, Martha accepts a proposal of marriage from Lord Francis Sherville.
- Julia Bradford: Julia is the Sister of Martha and the youngest daughter of Mr. Peregrine Bradford and Mrs. Bradford. Easily overcome by sensibility, Julia is not totally in control of her emotions at the beginning of the novel. Once Julia is introduced to high society, she begins to lose her sensible nature and becomes more like a non-ideal woman. She is caught sleeping with men like Sir Lionel Beacon by Martha. Briefly married to Gregory Leadenhead, Julia has a scandalous affair with Mr. Morley and terminates her own pregnancy. She travels to France where she takes her own life with poison after the death of her lover, Robespierre.
- Peregrine Bradford: Father of Martha and Julia, Peregrine Bradford is a gluttonous, middle-class man who made his fortune from the ground-up. His insatiable desire for luxury leads him to spend his money on material items such as carriages, rich foods, and exclusive lodgings at Bath. However, his indulgences lead to his untimely end when he dies from overeating.
- Mrs. (Bradford) Popkins: Mrs. Bradford is a passive character who always agrees with her husband. She prefers her youngest daughter Julia over Martha. She even refuses to take Martha in once her daughter is turned out of doors by her husband. After Peregrine's death, Mrs. Bradford places herself on the marriage market and marries a wealthy man named Mr. Popkins. Later in the novel, Mrs. Popkins is placed in an asylum by her daughter Julia. Martha helps her to escape the asylum during a fire.
- Mrs. Sedgley: Mrs. Sedgley is a high-born woman and also the mother of little Fanny. She leaves her illegitimate daughter with Martha and continues to pursue a travelling acting career. When Martha is turned out of doors, Mrs. Sedgley helps her find a job as an actress. Mrs. Sedgley is later revealed to be Susan Sherville, the sister of Lord Francis Sherville.
- Little Fanny (Frances): The illegitimate daughter of Mr. Morley and Susan Sherville.
- Lord Francis Sherville: Originally thought to be the father of Little Fanny, Lord Francis Sherville becomes friends with Martha and offers to take the child into his care. As the brother of Susan Sherville or more commonly known as Mrs. Sedgley, Lord Francis is actually Fanny's uncle. He later marries Martha.
- Sir Lionel Beacon: Sir Lionel Beacon is a member of the upper-class and he has numerous affairs with well known upper-class women. He is discovered sleeping with Martha's sister Julia and effectively ruins the girl's reputation.
- Lady Penelope Pryer: Lady Penelope Pryer is an upper-class woman who disapproves of the Bradfords when they arrive in Bath. She does take a liking to Julia because she is able to shape her into a proper woman. The novel ends with a recap of Lady Pryer's engagement to Gregory Leadenhead.
- Gregory Leadenhead: Gregory Leadenhead was briefly married to Julia, but once he found out about her affairs he demanded a divorce.
- Mr. Morley: Mr. Morley is a lawyer and the husband of Mrs. Morley of Mrs. Bradford. He claims to be a pious man, but it is evident from his various affairs that are revealed throughout the text that he is not a faithful man. He has a particularly scandalous affair with Martha's sister Julia where he encourages her to terminate her pregnancy. It is also revealed that Mr. Morley had had an affair with Mrs. Sedgley and is the father of Fanny. Upset by Martha's discovery of this affair, Mr. Morley attempts to murder Fanny, but instead falls to his death.
- Mrs. Grimwood: Mrs. Grimwood is a servant in the Morley household who began the rumor that Martha was Fanny's mother.

== Context ==
- The French Revolution: Mary Robinson's novel, The Natural Daughter with Portraits of the Leadenhead Family, was heavily influenced by the French Revolution that was taking place during the time that she was writing. Despite the novel being a fictitious rendition of the Reign of Terror, the novel reflects Robinson's own life as an actress and social celebrity. By bringing in characters who were active leaders of the revolution, Robinson is asking the reader to look beyond her celebrity to the fame that others scandalous public figures had. For example, characters such as Marat and Robespierre appear in the novel. By romanticizing these figures, Robinson is capitalizing on the public's support of liberty and freedom despite without drawing attention to the negative aspects of the revolution such as killing members of the upper-class.
- A Natural Daughter: The novel draws attention to what it means to be a single mother with an illegitimate child. The book title refers to two different definitions of "natural." For example, one way of reading the title could refer Fanny's illegitimacy while another perspective could suggest Julia's "unnatural" behaviour once she is introduced to higher society. These two perspectives complicate how the story is read and changes the reader's perception of the characters and their role in the novel.

The idea of not belonging to society can be extended to Martha, whose independence makes her "belong to nobody." She has also refused to succumb to the limits of womanhood so she doesn't necessarily belong to a body. During the time that The Natural Daughter was being written, women were expected to be submissive and delicate, but Robinson's characters shatter these stereotypes by taking on unconventional female identities. There was also a separation of the social and the sexual which meant that sexual identity was limited to gender ideologies. With the rise of middle-class society, the separation became less noticeable due to different definitions of gendered roles.

Throughout the text, Robinson calls out the double standards that are imposed by society on women. For example, women are tied to the idea that their honour relies on being chaste and respectable or in other words, their worth lies in the "purity" of their bodies. Men, on the other hand, are not held to this standard. They can have sexual relationships without being penalized because their honour relies on merit and title. In the text, Martha asserts herself as an author which gives her control over her life and her own body. As a successful, independent woman, she is able to break free from societal conventions. Julia, however, is convincing in her role as an ideal woman of the time. She is so convincing that she is unaware of how she hurts others as she adopts inappropriate behaviour that is influenced by the ideals of the French Revolution. The behaviour effectively makes Julia a "bad woman." Susan and Martha are "good women" who have been cheated by society due to their kind nature.
