= Maria Elizabeth Robinson =

English novelist (1774–1818)

- Born: 18 October 1774; Bristol, England
- Died: 4 January 1818 (aged 43); Berkshire, England
- Other names: Mary Elizabeth Robinson; M.E. Robinson; Miss Robinson
- Occupation: Novelist
- Years active: 1794–1806
- Relatives: Mary Robinson (mother)

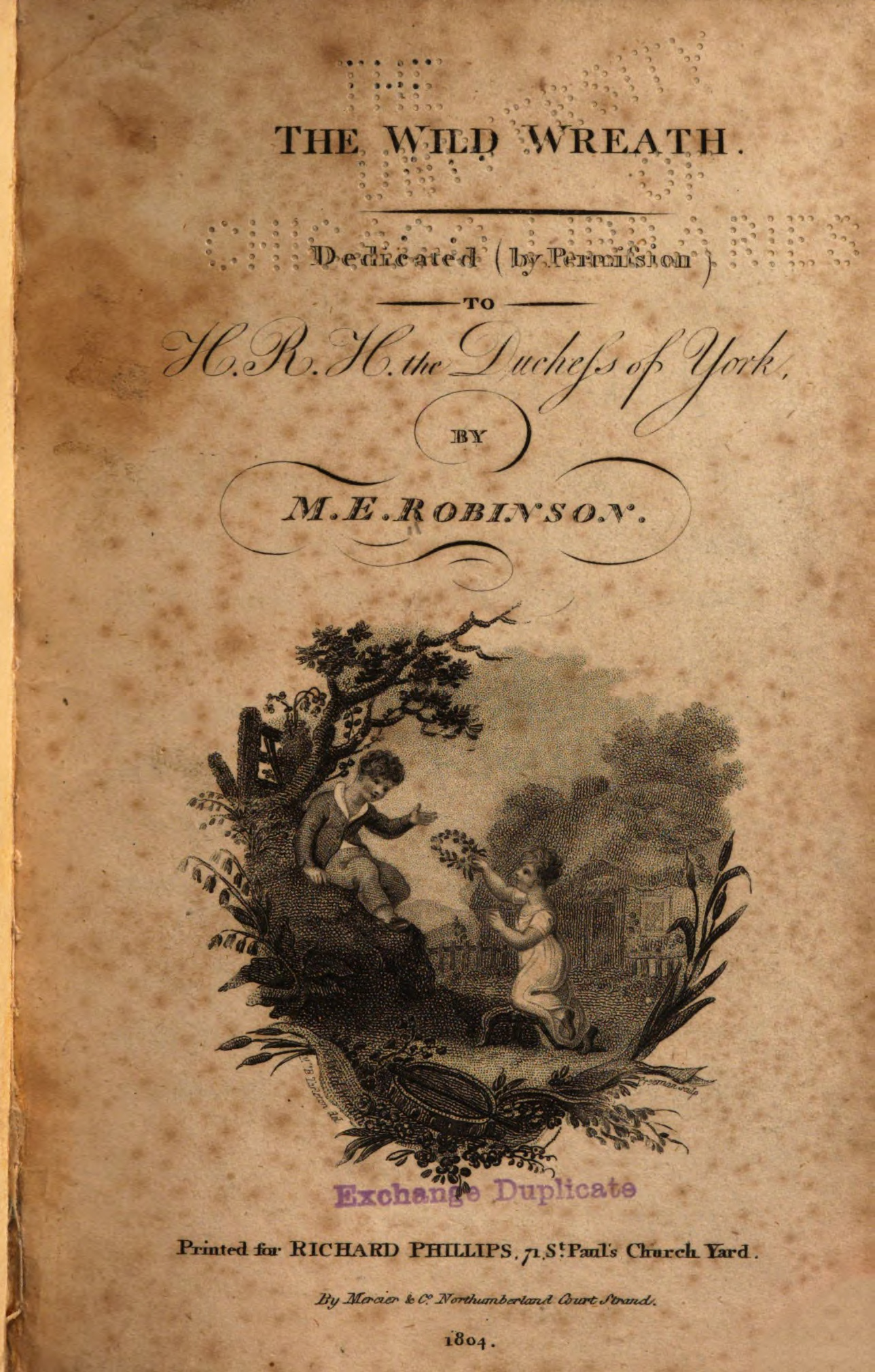
Title page of Maria Elizabeth Robinson's The Wild Wreath (1804)

Maria Elizabeth Robinson (18 October 1774 – 4 January 1818) was an English novelist. Her mother was the celebrated novelist Mary Robinson, and Maria Elizabeth edited and saw Mary's unpublished works through to publication after her death.

== Life and work ==
Robinson's parents had an eventful marriage, and as an infant, she spent some months in debtor's prison when her mother accompanied her father there. She had a sister, Sophia, who did not survive childhood. Subsequently, Robinson's mother embarked on a successful literary career, left her husband, and became socially prominent. Mary Robinson died in 1800 at the age of 44 after a prolonged period of ill-health and chronic debt, and requested that Maria Robinson edit and arrange for the publication of her unpublished works and her memoirs.

Robinson is probably best remembered now for her editing of her famous mother's work, but she was also a writer in her own right. In 1794 she published the first edition of her epistolary novel, The shrine of Bertha, with the Minerva Press, and it was moderately successful as a second edition came out, this time with Apollo Press, two years afterward. Ten years later she published a poetry anthology, The Wild Wreath, dedicated to the Duchess of York, which included her own work as well as unpublished pieces by her mother and poems by Samuel Taylor Coleridge, M. G. Lewis, Robert Merry, Anna Seward, Robert Southey, and Thomas Twisleton.

== Creative work ==
- The shrine of Bertha: a novel, in a series of letters. In two volumes. By Miss M. E. Robinson. ...printed for the author, by W. Lane at the Minerva Press, Leadenhall-Street; sold by Scatchard, Paternoster-Row; Miller, Old Bond-Street; Knight and Triphock, Booksellers to his Majesty, St. James's-Street, 1794.
- Wild Wreath. ([London?] Mercier, 1804.)

== Editorial work ==
Works of Mary Robinson, edited by Robinson and published posthumously:

- “Mr. Robert Ker Porter.” Public Characters of 1800-1801 (London: R. Phillips, 1801)
- Memoirs of the Late Mrs. Robinson, Written by Herself with Some Posthumous Pieces. In Four Volumes (London: R. Phillips, 1801)
- “Jasper. A Fragment,” Memoirs of the Late Mrs. Robinson, Vol. 3 (London: R. Phillips, 1801)
- “The Savage of Aveyron,” Memoirs of the Late Mrs. Robinson, Vol. 3 (London: R. Phillips, 1801)
- “The Progress of Liberty,” Memoirs of the Late Mrs. Robinson, Vol. 4 (London: R. Phillips, 1801)
- The Poetical Works of the Late Mrs. Mary Robinson: Including Many Pieces Never Before Published. In Three Volumes (London: Richard Phillips, 1806)

== See also ==
- Mary Robinson
