= Portrait of Mary Robinson =

Painting by Thomas Gainsborough

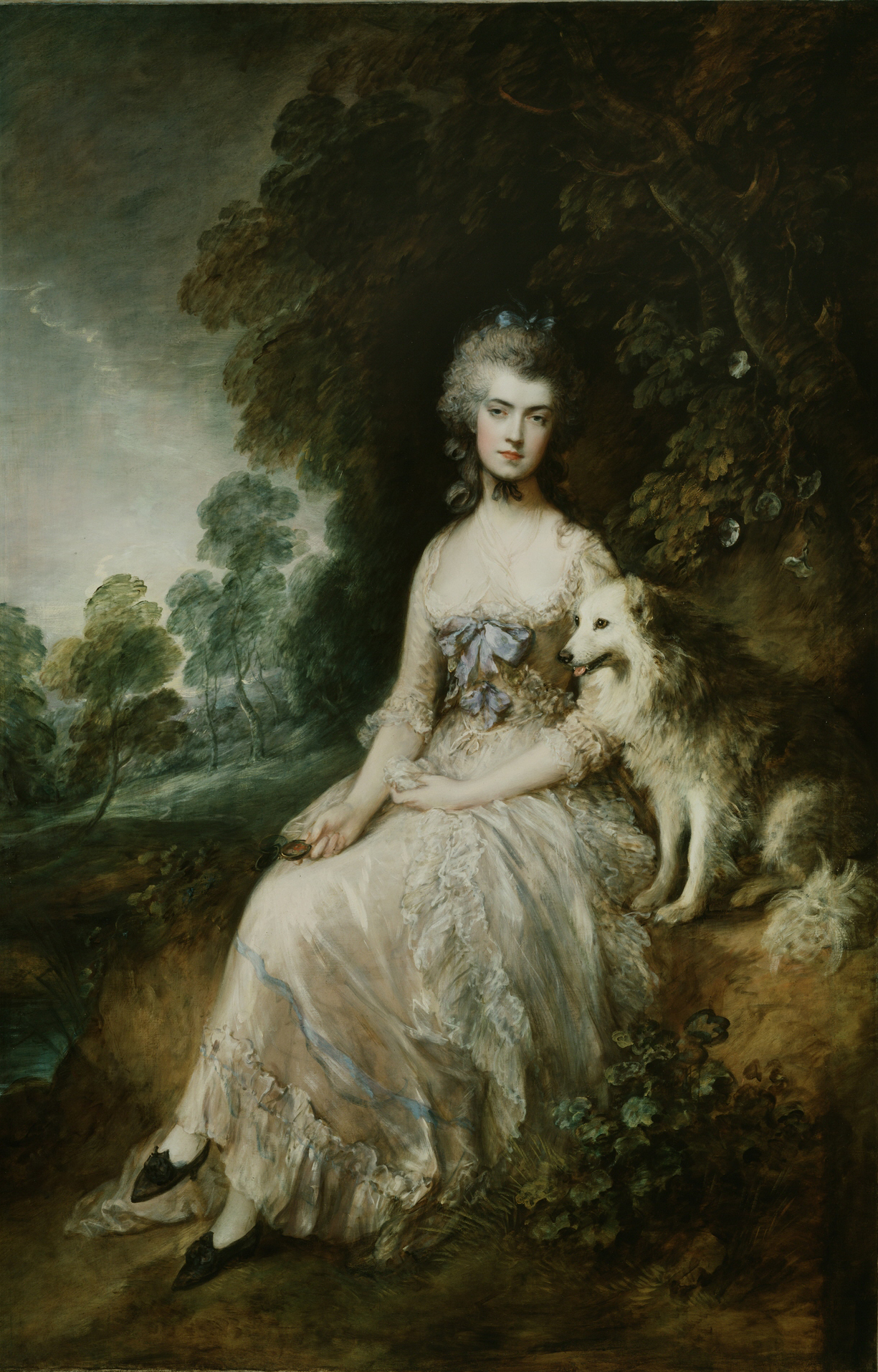
- Artist: Thomas Gainsborough
- Year: 1781
- Type: Oil on canvas, portrait painting
- Dimensions: 233.7 cm × 153 cm (92.0 in × 60 in)
- Location: Wallace Collection, London

Portrait of Mary Robinson is an oil on canvas portrait painting by the British artist Thomas Gainsborough, from 1781. It depicts the actress and writer Mary Robinson. It is held at the Wallace Collection, in London.

== History and description ==
Commissioned by her lover George, Prince of Wales, it depicts her as Perdita from The Winter's Tale play by William Shakespeare. Shown at full-length in a pastoral setting, Gainsborough may have referenced Perdita's abandonment by her royal lover, paralleling George's real-life dropping of Robinson as his mistress. Robinson may have been the most frequently depicted woman of the period along with Emma Hamilton.

The portrait was displayed at the Royal Academy Exhibition of 1782 at Somerset House. However, Gainsborough withdrew It following criticism of it as poor likeness that was inferior to a portrait of Robinson by his rival Joshua Reynolds that was also on display. The painting is now in the Wallace Collection, in Marylebone. In 1818, it was given by George, by then Prince Regent to the Marquess of Hertford and then passed down through his descendants

Another portrait of Robinson by George Romney, also exhibited at the Royal Academy, in 1782, is also in the Wallace Collection.

== Bibliography ==
- Hamilton, James. Gainsborough: A Portrait. Hachette UK, 2017.
- Lewis, Jayne, Kowalik, Jill & Coleman, Patrick (ed.) Representations of the Self from the Renaissance to Romanticism. Cambridge University Press, 2002.
- Postle, Martin. Thomas Gainsborough. Tate, 2002.
