= Vancenza; or, the Dangers of Credulity =

1792 novel by Mary Robinson

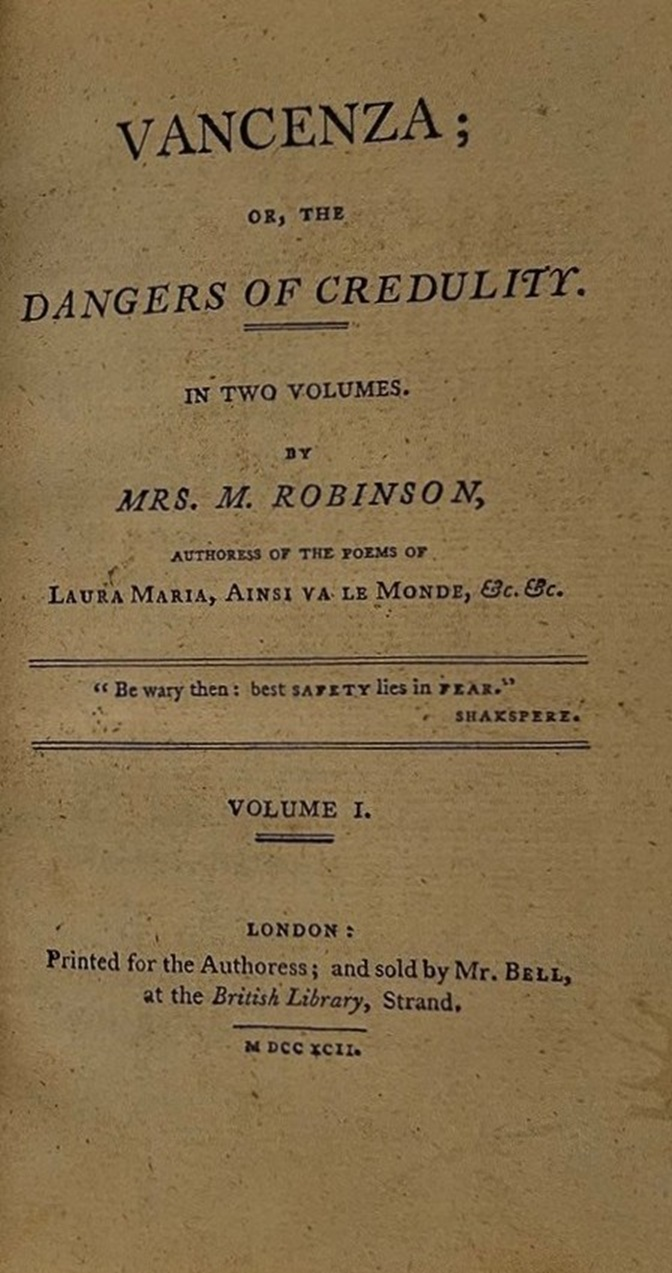
- First edition title page
- Author: Mary Robinson
- Language: English
- Genre: Gothic fiction
- Publisher: John Bell
- Publication date: 2 February 1792
- Publication place: United Kingdom
- Media type: Print
- Followed by: The Widow

Vancenza; or, the Dangers of Credulity is the debut novel by English author Mary Robinson, first published in February 1792. Perhaps due to Robinson's notoriety as a celebrity, particularly her affair with the Prince of Wales, the novel proved an instant success and sold out on its first day of publication. Its popularity saw a third edition appear later that month, in which Robinson wrote a dedication denouncing being called a "Writer of Novels". Despite this, Robinson would go on to publish a further six novels.

Set in fifteenth-century Spain, Vancenza capitalized on the then growing popularity of the Gothic novel, particularly in the wake of the success of Ann Radcliffe.

== Reception ==
Critical reception for Vancenza; or, the Dangers of Credulity proved mixed, the Gentleman's Magazine wrote that in light of "the abundance of trash which, under the appellation of Novel, is poured upon the publick," that the author would do well to "study simplicity of expression, the sweetest charm of writing, and the truest characteristick of excellence."

The Literary Magazine and British Review, while criticizing the trend for writing novels, wrote: "Novels are a species of writing, which can scarcely be spoken of without being condemned; however, we must excuse Vancenza from this general censure, as it is, in many respects, particularly the language, superior to the general run of those publications."
