= Florizel (The Winter's Tale) =

Character in The Winter's Tale

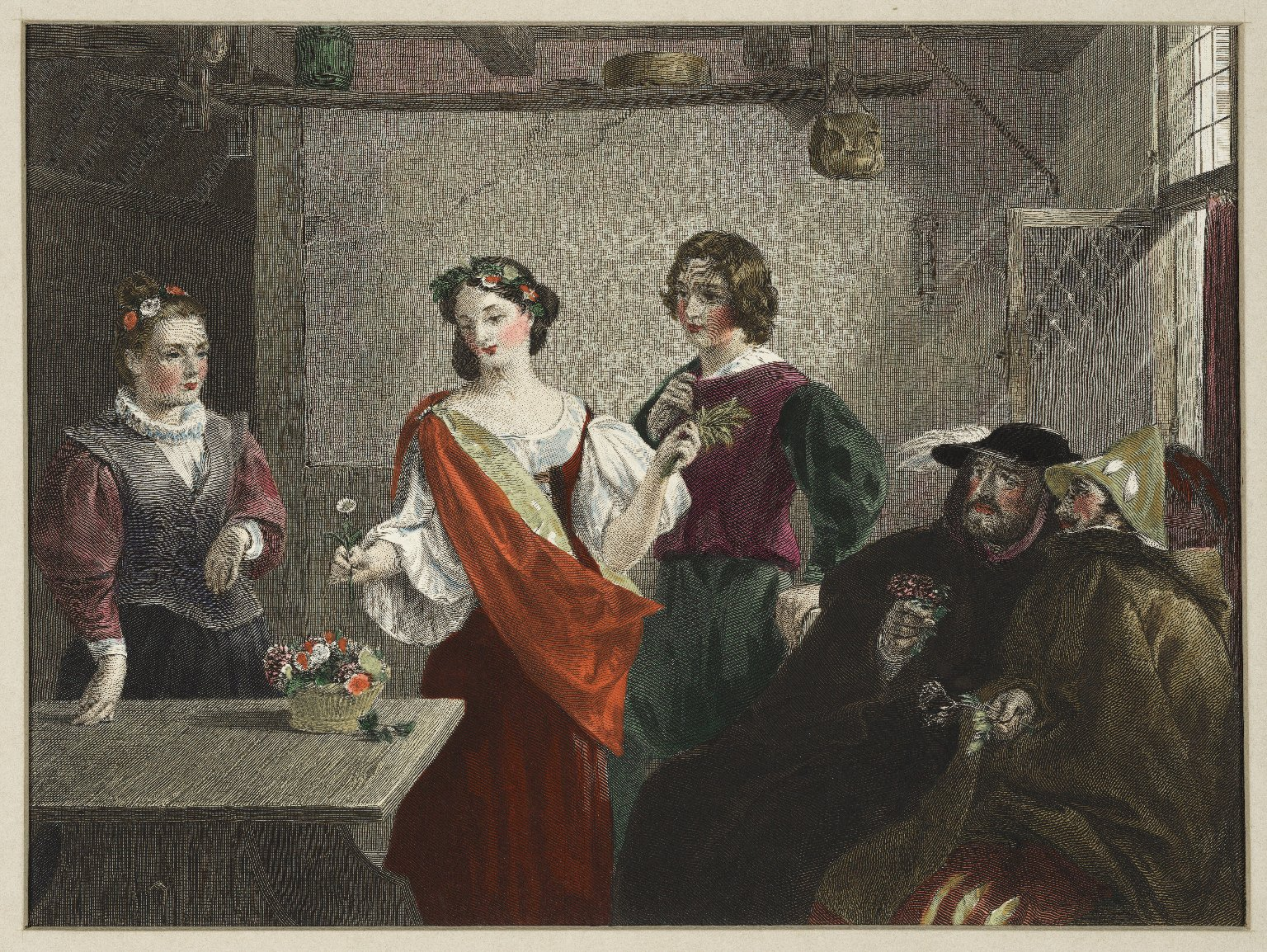
An engraving of Florizel and Perdita by Charles Robert Leslie.

Florizel is a fictional character in Shakespeare's The Winter's Tale.

Florizel is the son of Polixenes – King of Bohemia. He falls in love with Perdita, and wishes to marry her. His father objects to the marriage, however, and warns Florizel that his inheritance will be revoked if he ever seeks Perdita again. Polixenes objects to the marriage because he believes Perdita is a shepherdess and therefore unworthy of a royal marriage with Florizel.

In spite of this, Florizel remains in love with Perdita. With the intervention of Camillo, the dilemma is resolved because Perdita is actually of royal origin (the daughter of King Leontes).

== See also ==
- List of Shakespearean characters
