= Perdita (The Winter's Tale) =

Character in The Winter's Tale

- The Winter's Tale character
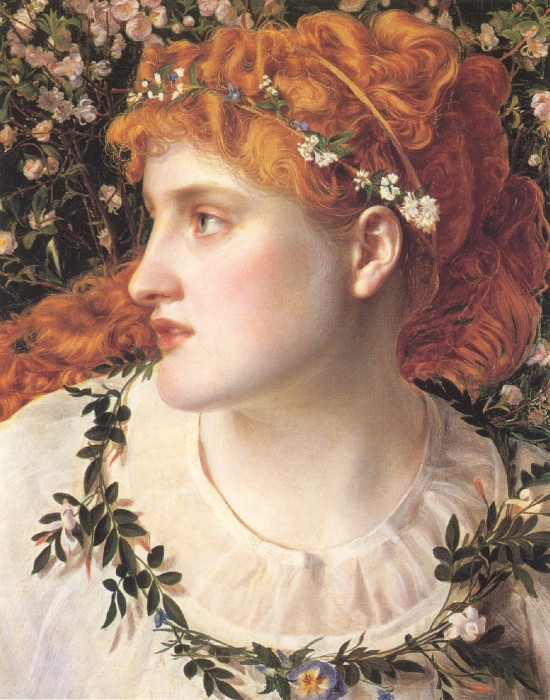
- Perdita dressed as a shepherdess (Perdita by Anthony Frederick Augustus Sandys)
- Created by: William Shakespeare

In-universe information
- Family: Leontes (Father); Hermione (Mother); Florizel (Fiancé); Polixines (Father-in-law)

Perdita (/ˈpɜːrdɪtə/ PER-di-tə) is one of the heroines of William Shakespeare's play The Winter's Tale. She is the daughter of Leontes, King of Sicily, and his wife Hermione.

== The Winter's Tale ==
Perdita was very small when she was thrown into prison, where her father had sent her mother because he wrongly believes she has been unfaithful to him. Paulina takes the baby to Leontes to try to convince him that the baby is his daughter, but he refuses to believe it, even with the striking similarity between the two. Instead, he thinks that she is the result of an affair between Hermione and Polixenes, King of Bohemia. He sends Antigonus to leave the infant Perdita in a remote place; Antigonus leaves her on the seacoast of Bohemia.

In a dream, Hermione appears to Antigonus and tells him to name her child Perdita, which means "the lost one" in Latin and, in Italian, "loss". He takes pity on her, but is chased away and eaten by a bear. Luckily, a shepherd living nearby stumbles upon her. He finds Perdita and also takes the box that Paulina had left with Antigonus. It contains jewels and a note and some money, for Paulina knew that if someone found Perdita, they would need an explanation. Perdita is brought back to the shepherd's house and is raised by the shepherd as his own daughter, along with his son.

Early in the play, Perdita is described as being a beauty of conception. Sixteen years later, Perdita has grown into a beautiful young woman, unaware of her royal heritage. Prince Florizel, the prince of Bohemia, falls in love with her and plans to marry her. His father, however, disapproves of the marriage and threatens the couple, so they flee to Sicilia with the help of Camillo. Prince Florizel disguises himself as a merchant in order to be able to see Perdita.

Later on, it is revealed that Perdita is the princess of Sicily, and Perdita is reunited with her father and mother. She had lived her life thinking she was one person, and found out she was another. She had only known the life of a simple girl. Leontes and Polixines reconcile, and both approve of Florizel and Perdita's marriage. It is assumed that Florizel and Perdita live happily ever after.
