= Rosalie Delafontaine =

French painter (1783–1821)

Anne-Rosalie de la Fontaine, also known as Rosalie Delafontaine (1783–1821) was a French painter active during the Napoleonic and early Restoration periods. A student of Jean-Baptiste Regnault, she exhibited regularly at the Paris Salon between 1806 and 1819, producing portraits and narrative scenes in oil, many of them featuring women and children.

== Life ==
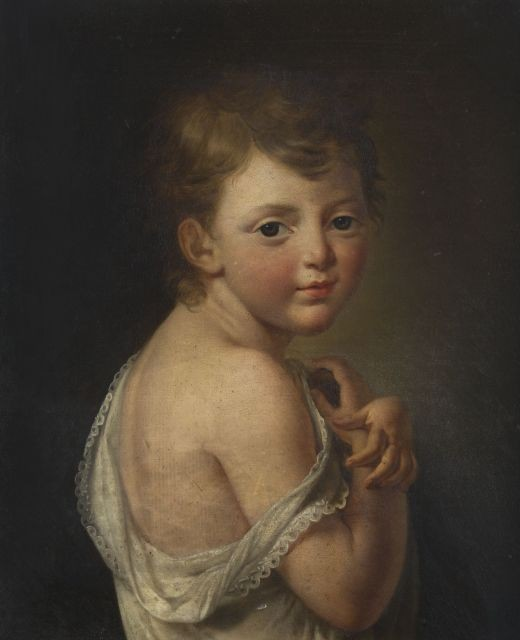
Portrait of a young girl (1819)

Anne-Rosalie de la Fontaine was born into a bourgeois family in the Faubourg Montmartre in Paris on 27 December 1783. She was baptised the following day at the local parish church, the Église Saint-Eustache. Her parents were Pierre François de la Fontaine, a spice merchant, and Anne-Rosalie Bernard.

De la Fontaine received formal artistic training in the studio of Jean-Baptiste Regnault, one of the leading painters of the French Neoclassical school. Her training prepared her for participation in the Paris Salon, where she began exhibiting in the first decade of the nineteenth century.

From 1806 to 1819, she exhibited regularly, presenting works including allegorical and sentimental scenes, as well as a large number of portraits, particularly of women and children. Many of these were full-length compositions, indicating both technical ambition and the social standing of her sitters.

She appears to have adopted the spelling Delafontaine from around 1810.

De la Fontaine died at the age of 35 on 29 April 1821 in Saint-Germain-en-Laye. A note dated the following day documents the payment of 129 francs 50 centimes for the expenses of her funeral procession, arranged by a Monsieur Dujardin and paid by her father.

== Works ==
De la Fontaine built a sustained professional career over more than a decade, exhibiting the following works at the Paris Salon:

1806

- Portrait de femme avec son enfant (Portrait of a woman with her child)

1808

- L’Amour n’ayant pu blesser Pandore (Love unable to wound Pandora)
- Portrait de Mlle Adrienne jouant avec un polichinelle (Portrait of Miss Adrienne playing with a Punch doll)

1810

- Un enfant donnant à manger à son chat (A child feeding her cat)
- Several portraits

1812

- Jeune fille avec des tourterelles (Young girl with turtledoves)
- Portraits

1814

- Une veuve près du tombeau de son époux (A widow by her husband’s tomb)
- Portrait

1817

- Portrait en pied de Mme de L. avec sa fille (Full-length portrait of Mme de L. with her daughter)
- Jeune fille tressant une couronne de bluets (Young girl weaving a crown of cornflowers)
- Enfant jouant avec un oiseau (Child playing with a bird)

1819

- Enfant tenant un panier de fleurs (Child holding a basket of flowers)
- Portrait en pied de Mme de L. et de sa fille (Full-length portrait of Mme L. and her daughter)
