= Mauritz Björnström-Steffansson =

Swedish businessman who survived the sinking of the Titanic (1883–1962)

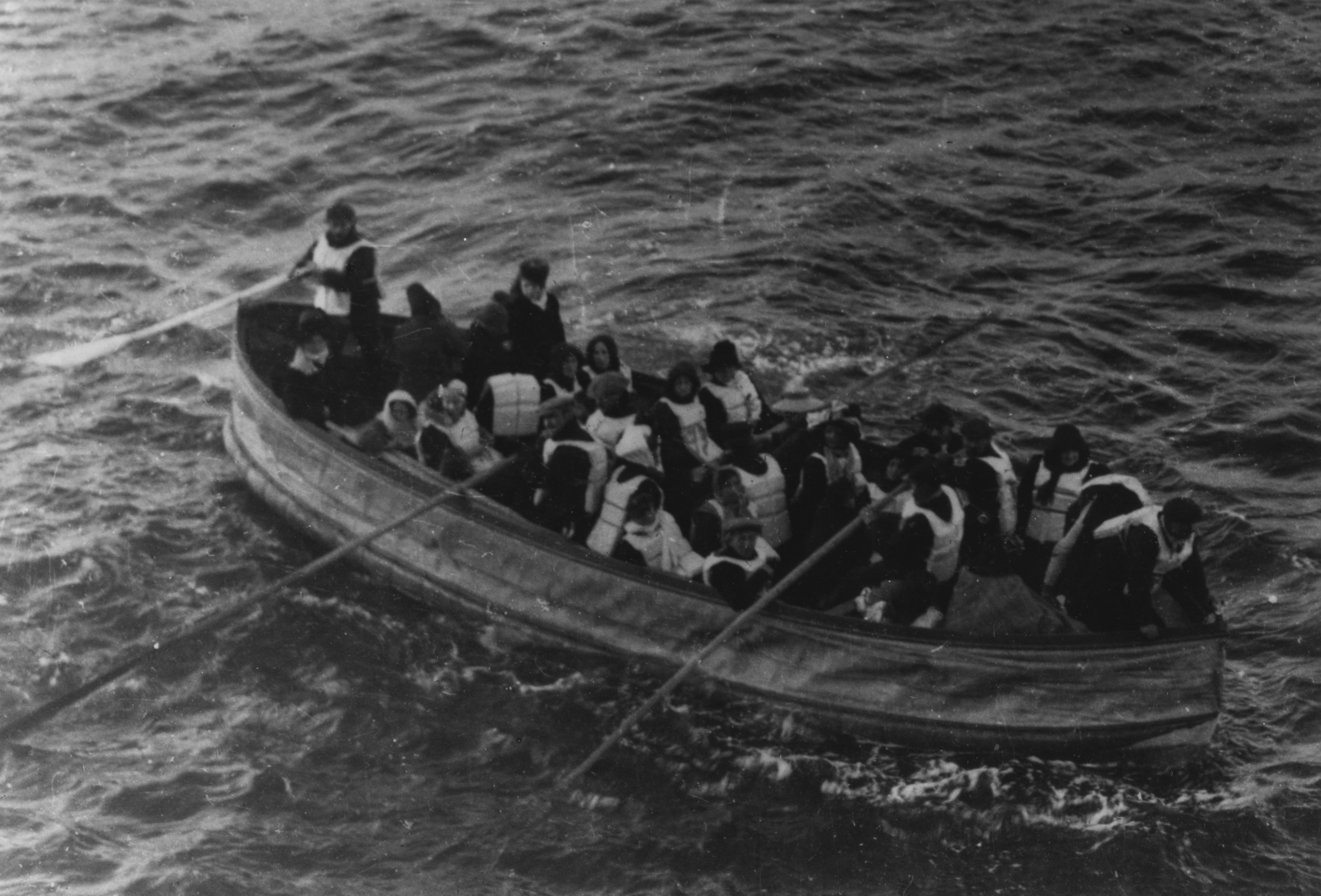
- Björnström-Steffansson was in lifeboat D
- Born: 9 November 1883; Österfärnebo, Sweden
- Died: 21 May 1962 (aged 78); New York City, United States
- Occupation: Businessman
- Known for: RMS Titanic Survivor

Mauritz Håkan Björnström-Steffansson (Swedish pronunciation: [ˈmaɵrɪʈs hoːkan bjœrsʈrœːm-sʈe:ffanssɔn']; 9 November 1883 – 21 May 1962) was a Swedish businessman who survived the sinking of the RMS Titanic in 1912. In early 1913, Steffansson filed by far the largest claim for financial compensation made against the White Star Line, for the loss of a single item of luggage or cargo as a result of the disaster.

== Early life ==
Mauritz Håkan was born to Erik Samuel Steffansson and Berta Maria Björnström on 9 November 1883 in Österfärnebo, Sweden. His father was a pioneer in the Swedish wood pulp industry. After studying chemical engineering at the Stockholm Institute of Technology, Steffansson was awarded a Swedish government scholarship to continue his studies in Washington, D.C. He became a reserve underlöjtnant in the Svea Artillery Regiment in 1904.

== Titanic survivor ==
On 10 April 1912, Steffansson bought a first class ticket and boarded the Titanic at Southampton (ticket number 110564, £26 11s). According to the testimony of Hugh Woolner at the United States Senate Inquiry into the disaster, he and Steffansson were in the first class smoking room at the moment of impact with the iceberg. After putting on their lifebelts, the two men went on deck and began helping crew members fill the lifeboats with women and children, in what they initially believed was a precautionary exercise.

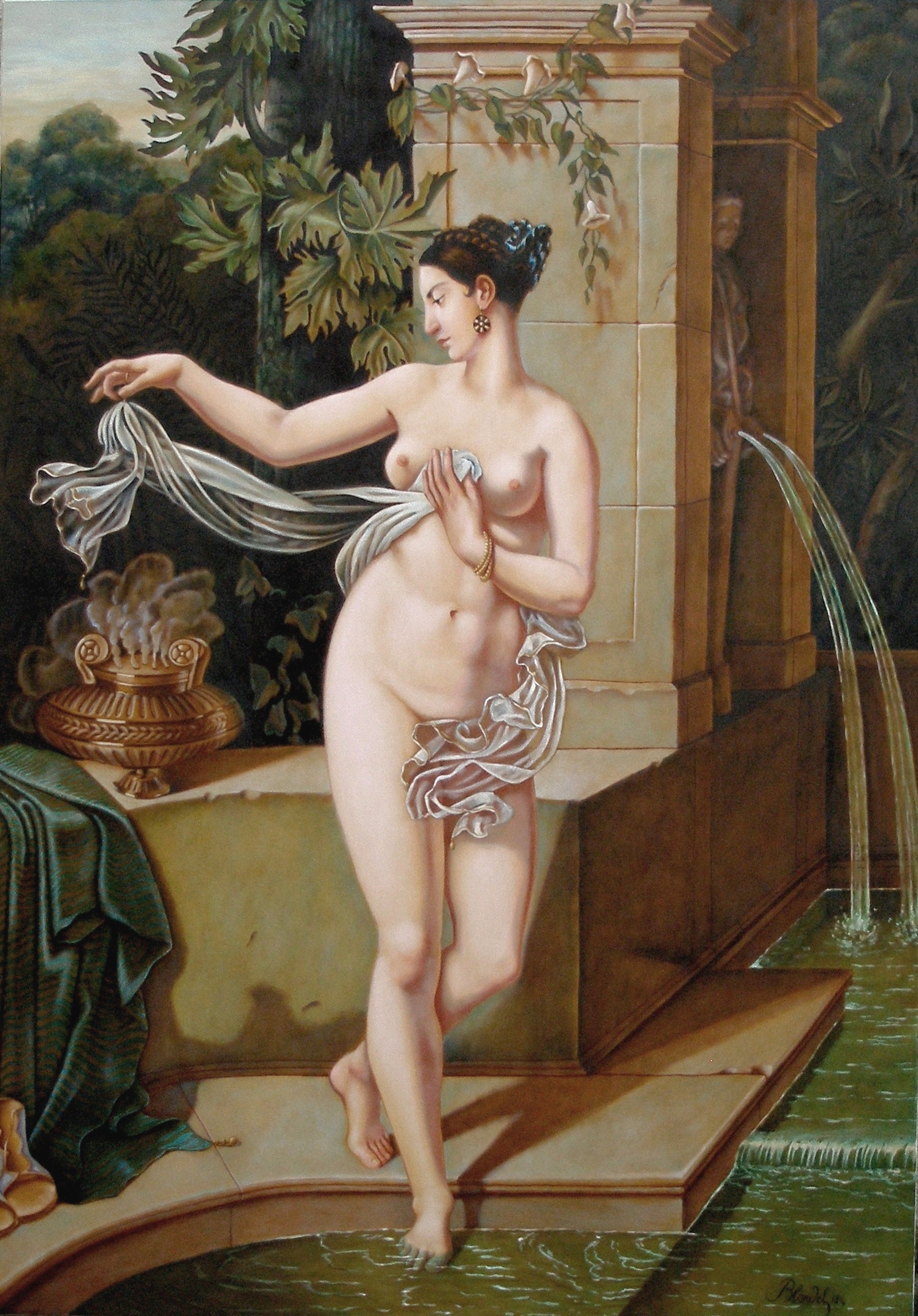
Copy (after Blondel) of painting owned by Steffansson and lost on the RMS Titanic in 1912.

Once the seriousness of the situation was understood, Woolner recounted, he and Steffansson helped the crew physically remove a number of men who had forced their way into lifeboat C, ahead of women and children. Woolner confirmed that when all the lifeboats were launched, moments before the ship finally went under, he and Steffansson took the opportunity to jump from the rails of the flooding A deck into an empty space at the bow of collapsible lifeboat D, the last lifeboat to leave the ship. Woolner and Steffansson pulled another man from the water and together, they helped to row the lifeboat away from the ship.

=== Awards committee ===
After the disaster, Steffansson joined a survivors' committee which formed to award medals and a cup to the Captain, officers, and crew of the rescue ship RMS Carpathia.

=== Claim for lost painting ===
Compensation claims submitted to US commissioner Gilchrist in New York, in January 1913, included a submission from Björnström-Steffansson demanding $100,000 (equivalent to $3.3 million in 2025) in compensation for the loss of La Circassienne au Bain, a large neoclassical oil painting by French painter Merry-Joseph Blondel. The compensation claim was the largest submitted for a single item of either passenger luggage or cargo.

== Later life ==
In 1917, Steffansson married Mary Pinchot Eno, whom he was introduced to by fellow Titanic survivor Helen Churchill Candee. In the 1920s, Steffansson made a large fortune by acquiring significant interests in Canadian paper and pulp industries, and in real estate. He was also responsible for developing significant real estate holdings in the Park Avenue area of New York into apartments and hotels. He retired in 1930.

Mary Björnström-Steffansson died in 1953, Mauritz Håkan in May 1962. At the time of his death, the couple's residence on East 57th Street was one of the few remaining private houses on Manhattan island. As the Björnström-Steffanssons were childless, the bulk of their fortune was left to Mauritz Håkan's nephew Thord Steffansson.
