= La Circassienne au Bain =

Lost painting by Merry-Joseph Blondel

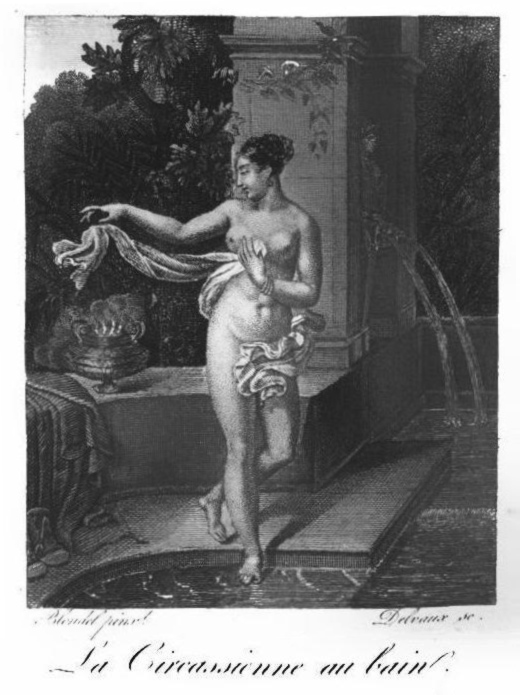
An illustration of the painting which appeared in the publication Almanach des Dames in 1823.

La Circassienne au Bain ("The Circassian Lady in the Bath"), also known as Une Baigneuse ("A Bathing Lady"), was a large Neoclassical oil painting from 1814 by Merry-Joseph Blondel depicting a life-sized young naked Circassian woman bathing in an idealized setting from classical antiquity. The painting was lost with the sinking of the Titanic in 1912. When financial compensation claims were filed with US commissioner Gilchrist in January 1913, the painting gained notoriety as the subject of the largest claim made against the White Star Line for the loss of a single item of baggage or cargo.

== History ==
=== Louvre exhibition ===
The painting was first exhibited at the Paris Salon, at the Louvre museum in November 1814. The initial critical reaction to the painting was muted, with positive descriptions restricted to praising the painting's overall competence and Merry-Joseph Blondel's attention to detail. Apart from technical misgivings about the twist of the upper body and the absence of 'grace' in the figure of the young woman, the chief concern of the critics seems to have been that, despite its large scale, it was not as exciting a painting as some of Blondel's previous works. However, by 1823, critics began talking more enthusiastically about the painting, apparently influenced both by the favourable popular reception to printed reproductions of the painting and by Blondel's improving career status.

=== Loss on the RMS Titanic ===
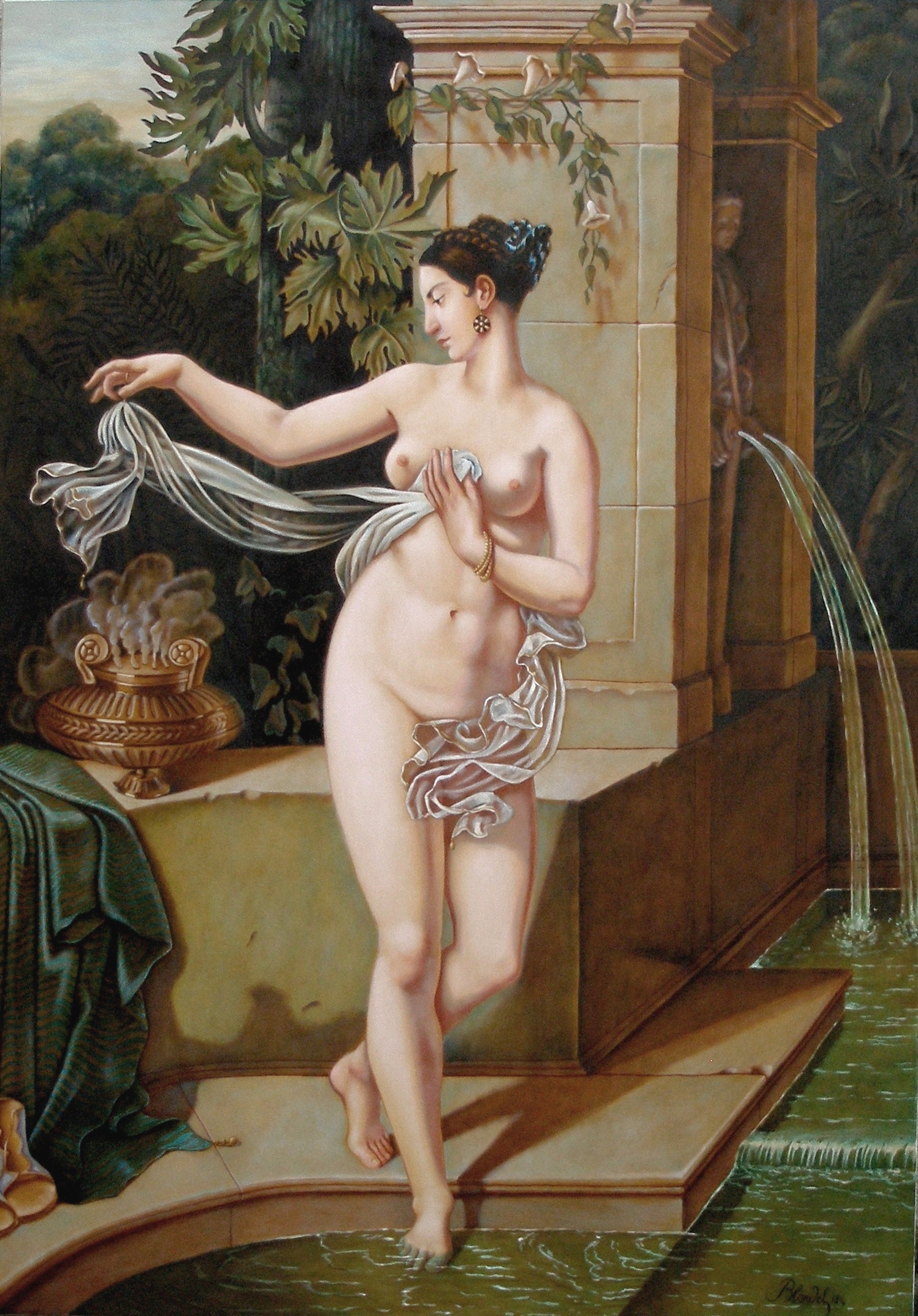
A copy by John Parker (first exhibited in November 2014)

In January 1913, a claim was filed in New York against the White Star Line, by Titanic survivor Mauritz Björnström-Steffansson, for financial compensation resulting from the loss of the painting. The amount of the claim was $100,000 (equivalent to $3.3 million today), making it by far the most highly valued single item of luggage or cargo lost as a result of the sinking. Bjornstrom-Steffansson did not receive the compensation he asked; all the cases against White Star were settled for a combined amount of $644,000 (equivalent to $22 million today).

== Size of the painting ==
The size of the painting is described in 1911, one year before Titanic's sinking, as being 192 cm × 128 cm (76 in × 50 in)

Steffansson's claim form described a substantial painting "8 x 4 feet" in size, but did not specify whether this referred to the painted canvas size, the canvas plus frame or the crate size.
