= Merry-Joseph Blondel =

French painter (1781–1853)

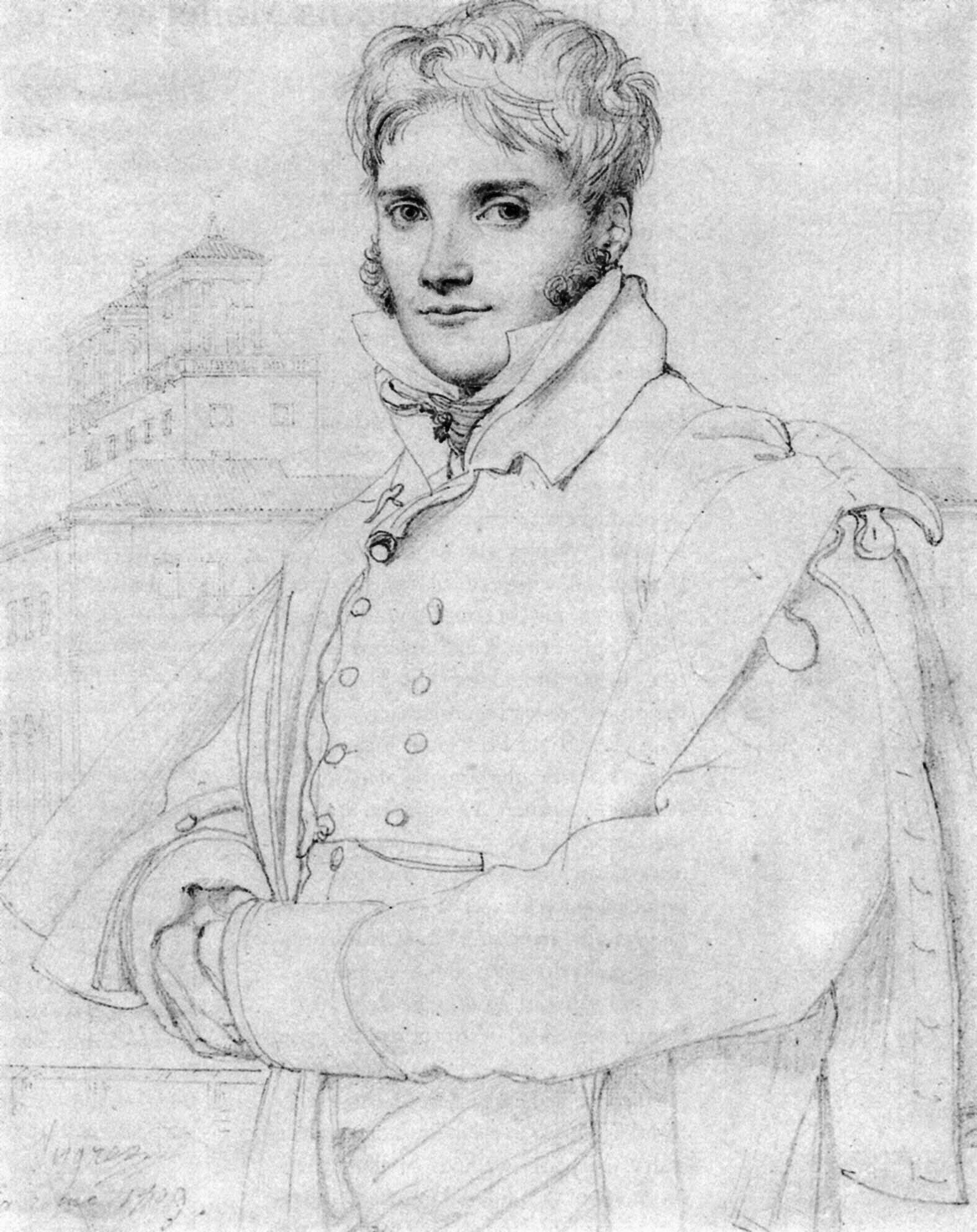
- Blondel by his friend Ingres, Rome, 1809
- Born: Merry-Joseph Blondel; 25 July 1781; Paris, France
- Died: 12 June 1853 (aged 71); Paris, France
- Known for: Painting
- Notable work: La Circassienne au Bain
- Movement: Neo-Classical

Merry-Joseph Blondel (French pronunciation: [mɛʁi ʒozɛf blɔ̃dɛl]; 25 July 1781 – 12 June 1853) was a French history painter of the Neoclassical school. He was a winner of the prestigious Prix de Rome in 1803. After the Salon of 1824, he was bestowed with the rank of Knight in the order of the Legion d'Honneur by Charles X of France and offered a professorship at the École nationale supérieure des Beaux-Arts: a position in which he remained until his death in 1853. In 1832, he was elected to a seat at the Académie des Beaux-Arts in Paris.

Blondel was a student of the Neoclassical master Baron Jean-Baptiste Regnault and from 1809, a lifelong friend of the painter Ingres.

For much of Blondel's painting career, he was occupied with public commissions for paintings and frescoes in important buildings, including palaces, museums and churches. Blondel completed major commissions for the Palace of Fontainebleau, the Palace of Versailles, the Louvre Museum, the Brongniart Palace (also known as the Bourse de Paris), the Luxembourg Palace, and the churches of St.Thomas Aquinas and Notre-Dame-de-Lorette.

Blondel's 1814 painting La Circassienne au Bain became infamous during the early part of the 20th century for being the subject of the largest claim for financial compensation made against the White Star Line, for a single item of luggage lost by a passenger on the RMS Titanic.

== Early life ==
Merry-Joseph was born on 25 July 1781 to Joseph-Armand Blondel (1740–1805), a painter and expert in stucco decoration, and his second wife Marie-Geneviève Marchand (died 1819). Merry-Joseph had two brothers and a sister, including Charles-Francois Armand Blondel, an architect. Several generations of the Blondel family had become associated with architecture and the design and decoration of buildings. Blondel's great uncle, Jacques-Francois Blondel (1705–1774) wrote a treatise on the subject and opened the first dedicated school of architecture in Paris.

== Career ==
=== Dihl & Guerhard ===
At the age of fourteen, on the advice of his maternal uncle, Merry-Joseph went to work in the office of a Notary, an experience which he would later describe as "excruciating". After two years of complaining to his father, in 1797, a place was secured for him as an apprentice at the Dihl and Guerhard porcelain factory, where young apprentices received figure drawing lessons from the celebrated Charles-Etienne Leguay for five out of every ten working days. By 1801, however, demand for Dihl and Guerhard porcelain had increased so much that the drawing department was eliminated and apprentices were expected to focus on decorative techniques more suited to the demands of mass-production, directly on the factory floor.

=== Regnault's studio and the Prix de Rome ===
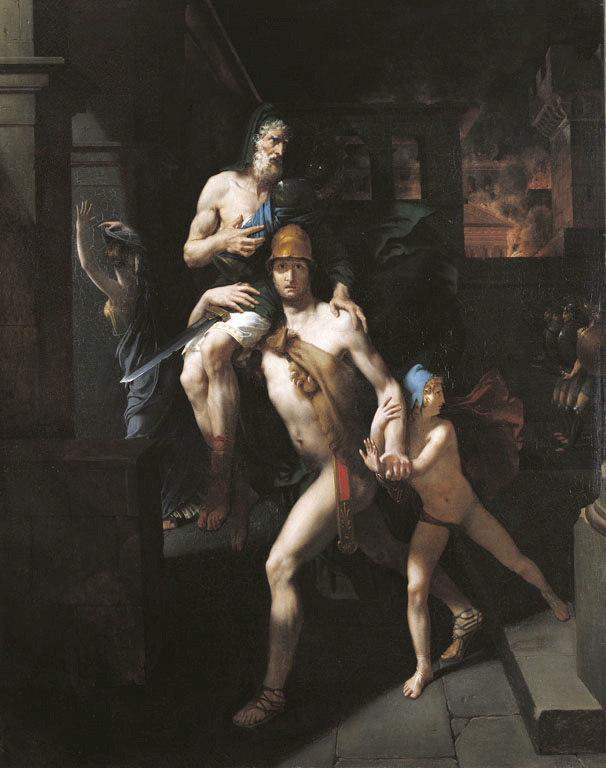
Aeneas rescuing his father from Troy, oil on canvas, 1803

In 1801, once again, Blondel convinced his father to break his apprenticeship contract as his drawing talent secured him a place in the studio of Baron Jean-Baptiste Regnault. Within a year, Blondel had acquired the nickname Monsieur Cinq-Prix (Mr Five-prizes) among his peers at the studio, on account of the number of medals and prizes he had won for his drawing. Another year on and Blondel's entry to the 1803 salon, a painting depicting Aeneas rescuing his father from the burning city of Troy, won him the Grand Prix de Rome. However, due to a change in the system and the temporary suspension of scholarships, no students were sent to the French Academy in Rome that year and Blondel would have to wait until 1809 before he could take his place at the Villa Medici.

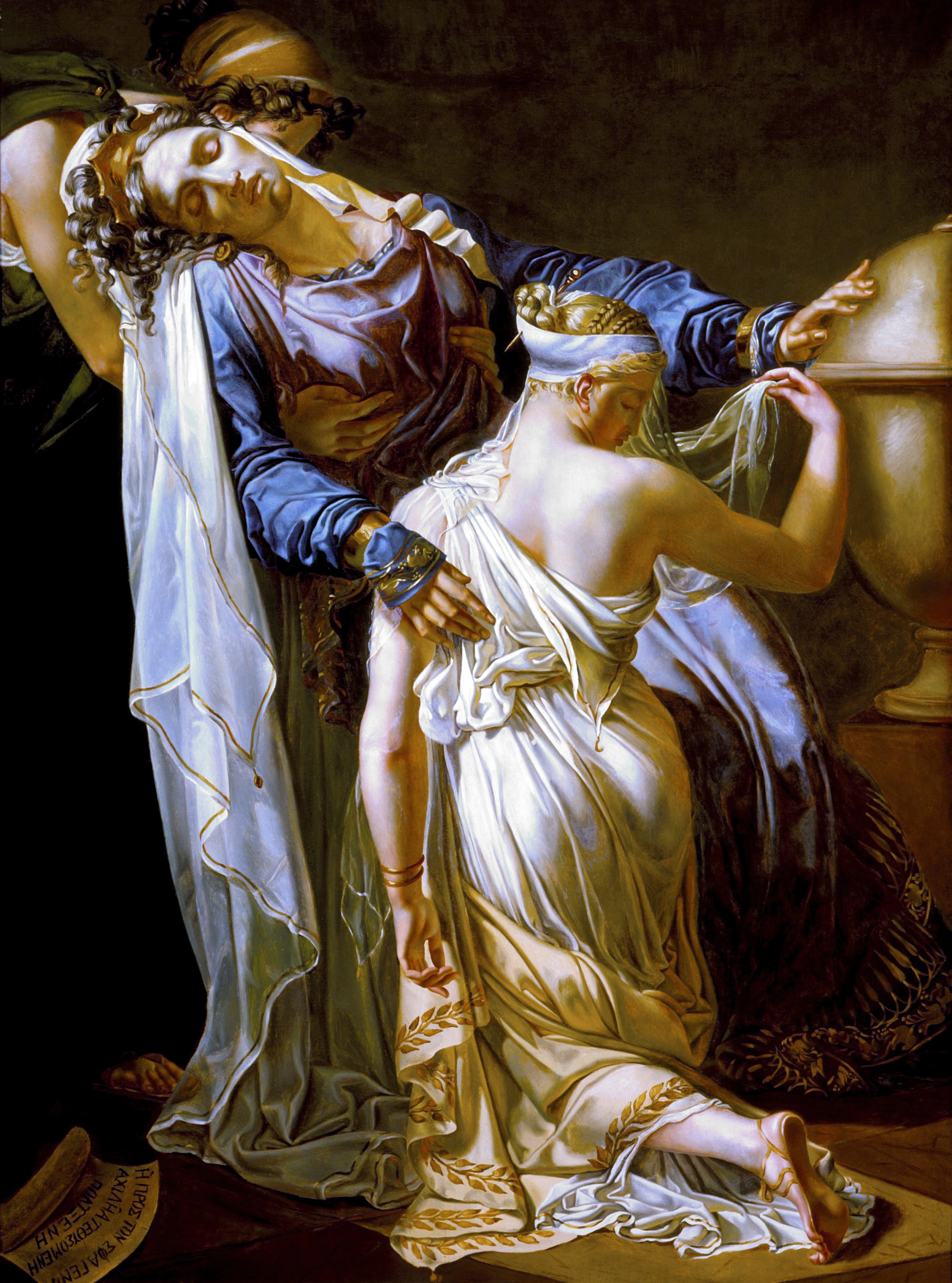
Hecuba and Polyxena, oil on canvas, after 1814

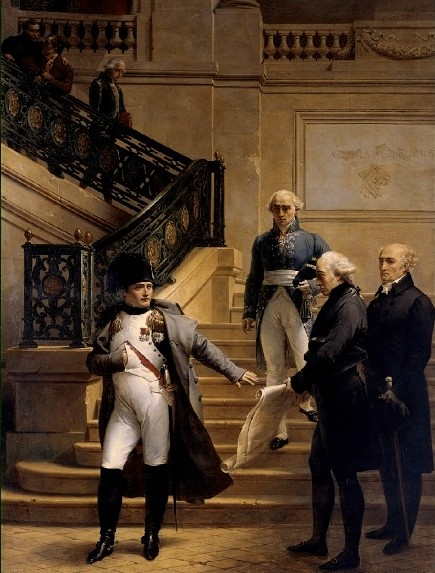
Napoleon visiting the Palais Royal for the opening of the Tribunat in 1807, oil on canvas

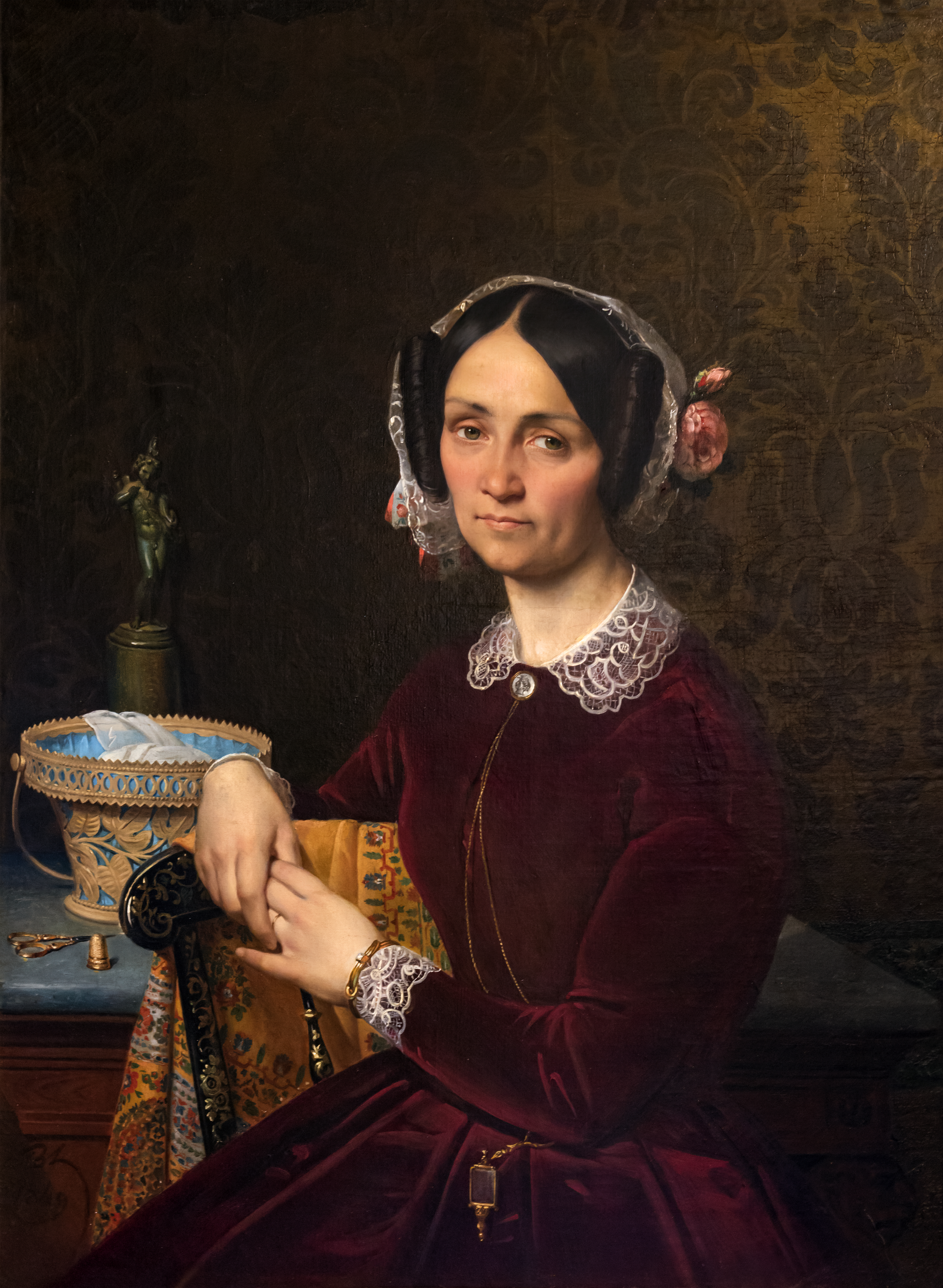
Portrait of Madame Blondel (1849), oil on canvas

=== Rome and Ingres ===
On arrival at the Villa Medici in Rome in 1809, Blondel struck up a friendship with fellow student Jean Auguste Dominique Ingres which, as correspondence between the two artists demonstrated, lasted for the rest of their lives. In 1835, Ingres returned as the director of the French Academy in Rome and Blondel appeared to be the favourite to succeed him in 1840. Together with his second wife, Louise Emilie Delafontaine, Blondel stayed at the Villa Medici as a guest of Ingres for four months in 1839, during which time the three of them undertook a lengthy sketching tour of the Marches and Umbria. When Blondel was unexpectedly overlooked for the position of director of the academy in 1840, Ingres sent him a "lengthy and heartfelt" letter of condolence.

=== Further awards ===
After three years in Rome, Blondel returned to Paris and became a regular exhibitor at the Louvre salon exhibitions. At the salon of 1817, Blondel won a gold medal for his painting depicting the Death of Louis XII. After the Salon of 1824, the rank of Chevalier (Knight) in the order of the Legion d'Honneur, was bestowed upon both Blondel and Ingres by the French King, Charles X.

=== Académie and École ===
In 1824, the year of his knighthood, Blondel was awarded a professorship at the École nationale supérieure des Beaux-Arts, a position which he occupied until his death in 1853. In that same year, Blondel also competed for a vacant seat at the Académie des beaux-arts but lost out to Ingres. He was eventually elected to a seat at the Académie in 1832.

== Public commissions ==
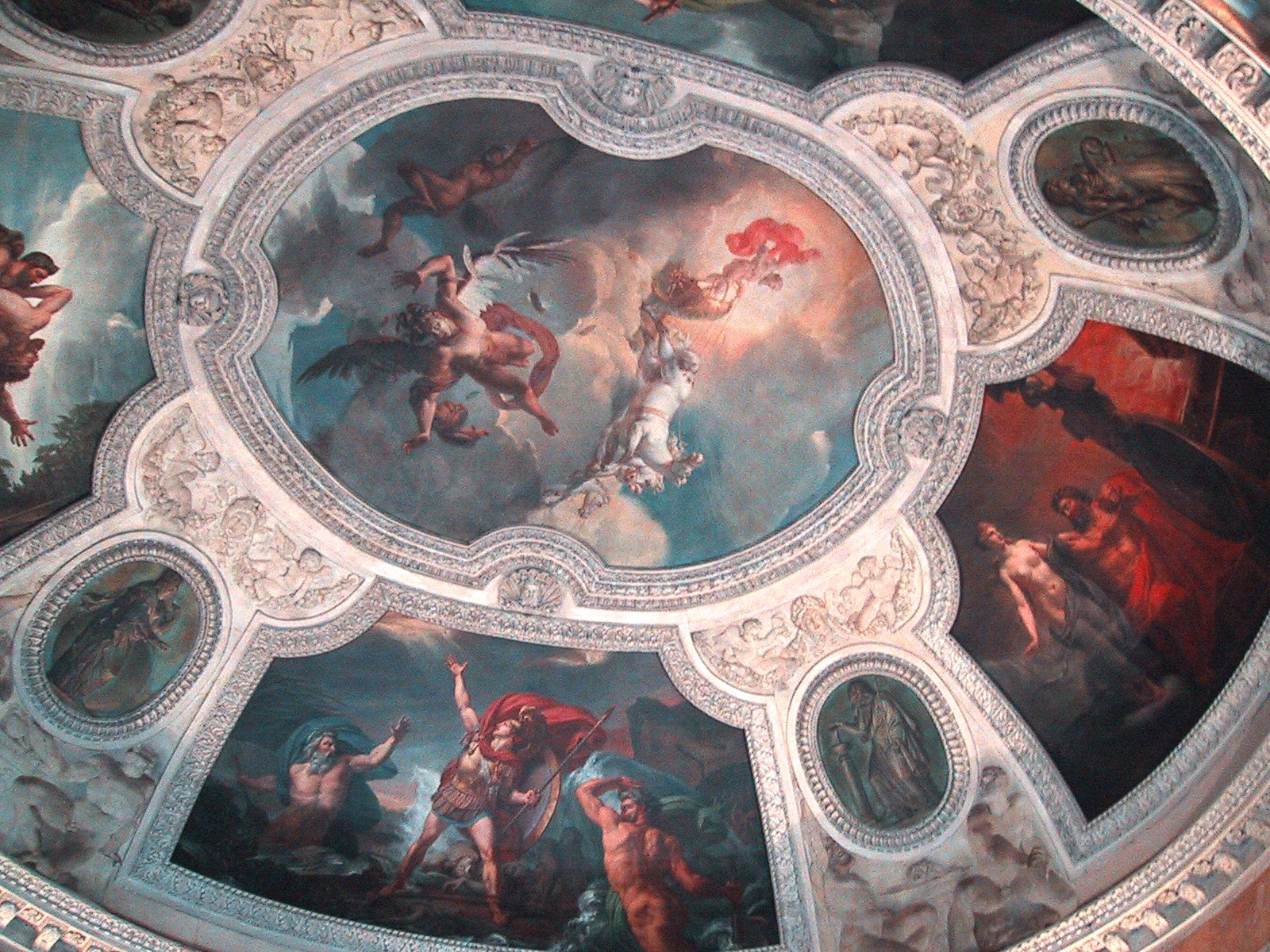
The fall of Icarus, ceiling fresco, Palais du Louvre

By the mid-1820s, his many notable achievements had firmly established Blondel as a history painter of great renown and he was accordingly rewarded with many public commissions for paintings and frescoes in important buildings, including museums, palaces and churches. Most notable among these commissions were:

- at the palace of Fontainebleau - Salon and Gallery of Diana, a fresco series of 21 paintings of scenes related to the goddess Diana.
- the Palace of Versailles - a series of full sized portraits depicting all the known kings and queens of France.

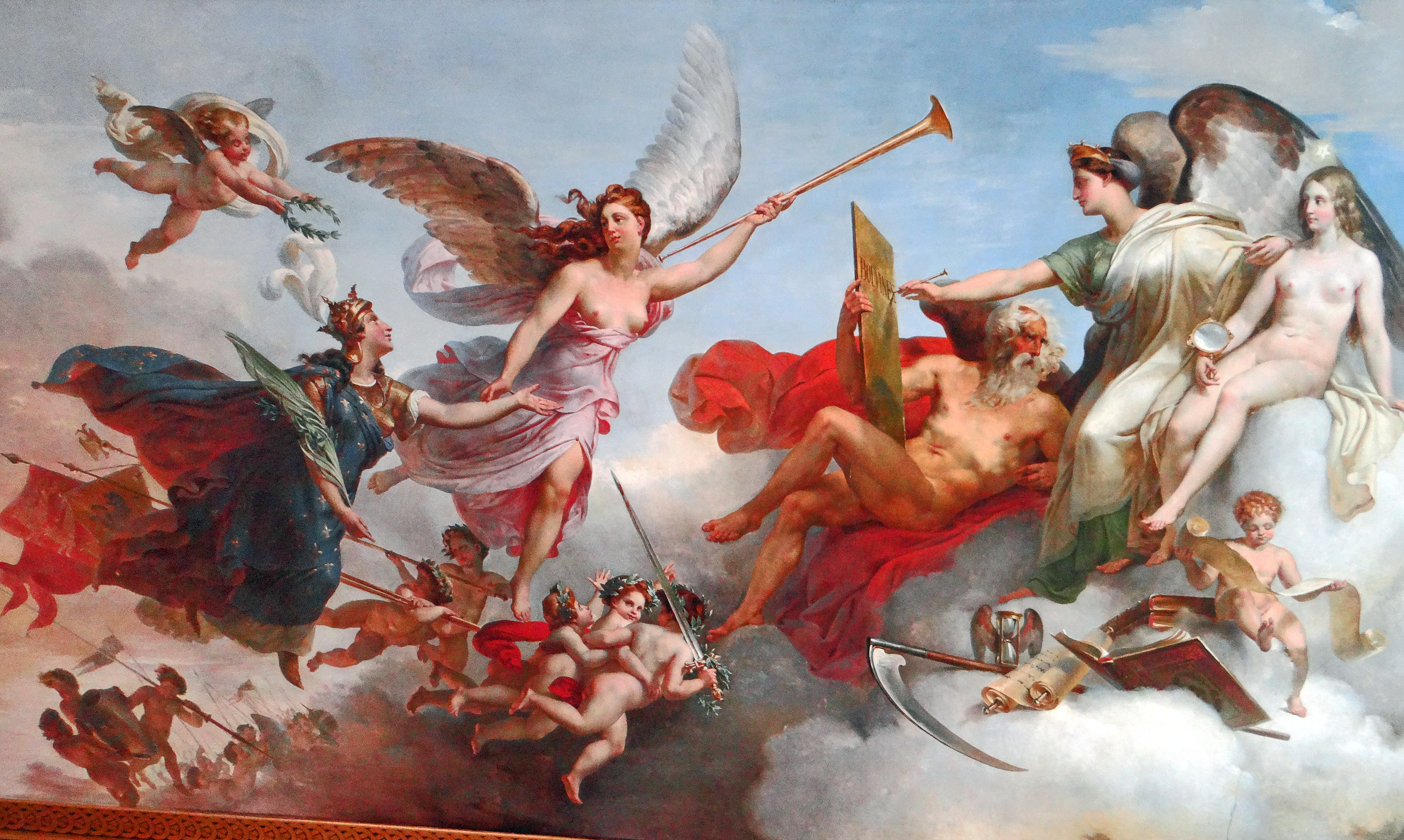
La France victorious at Bouvines, Palais du Louvre

- the Louvre Museum - frescoes in the Grand staircase (Personification of France receiving the constitutional charter), the Salle Henri II (scene depicting Minerva and Neptune), Rooms of the state counsel (La France victorieuse à Bouvines to commemorate the victory at the Battle of Bouvines).
- the Brongniart Palace (also known as the Bourse de Paris) - Ceiling painting and several cameos.
- the Luxembourg Palace - ceiling fresco in the Salle des Séances.
- the church of Notre-Dame-de-Lorette.
- the church of St.Thomas Aquinas - fresco cycle.

Blondel was working on his fresco cycle at the church of St. Thomas Aquinas, in the 7e arrondissement when he fell ill and died in 1853.

== La Circassienne au Bain ==
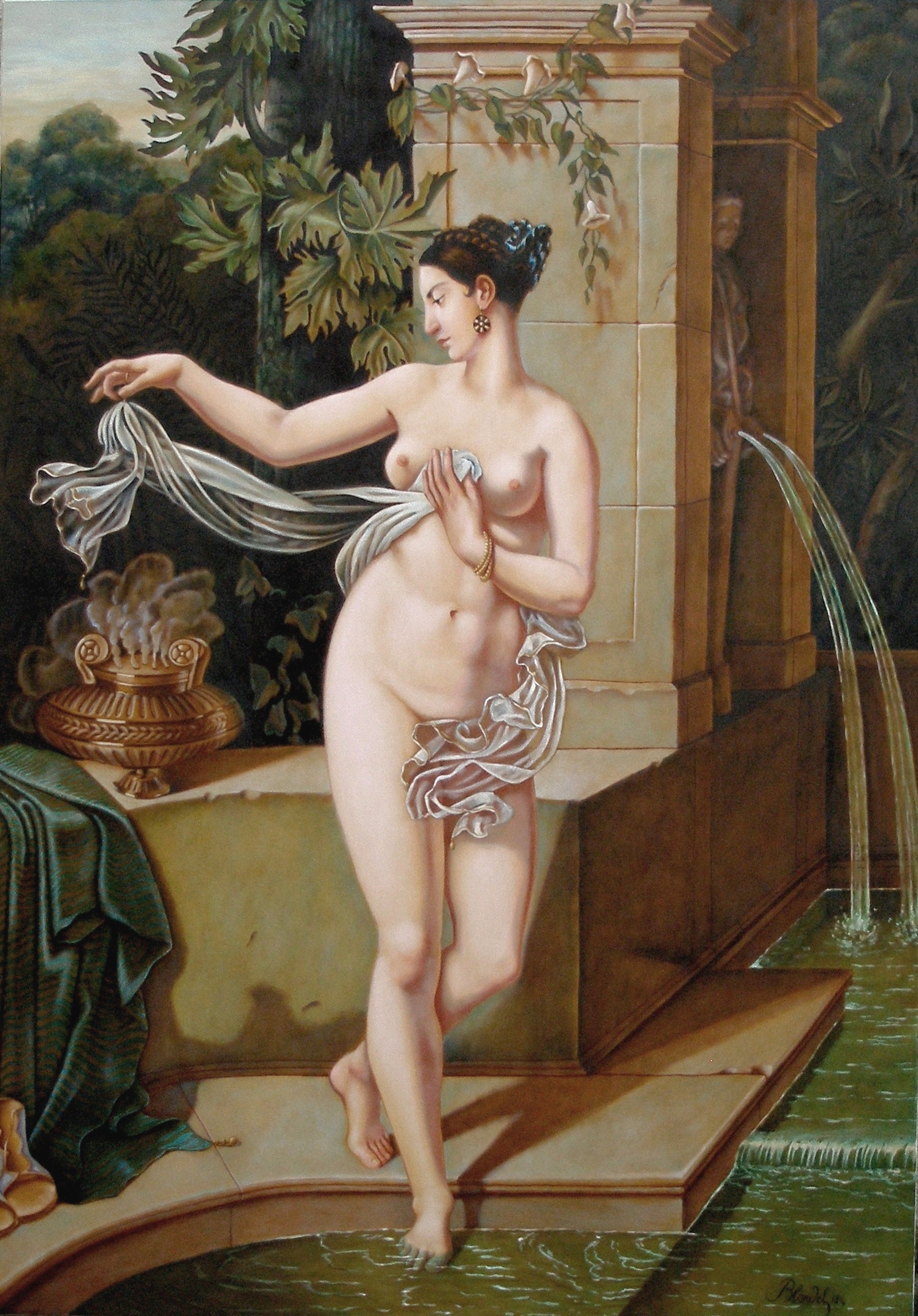
Copy after Blondel of painting lost on the RMS Titanic in 1912

=== Louvre exhibition ===
Blondel's entry for the salon exhibition in November 1814 was a full-sized figure painting, in oil on canvas, depicting a standing female figure, bathing in an idealised setting from classical antiquity. In typically simplistic fashion, the exhibition catalogue described the painting as painting no.108, Une Baigneuse (a bather). Critical references to the painting would later confirm Blondel's given title for the picture as La Circassienne au Bain.

=== Loss on the RMS Titanic ===
In January 1913, a claim was filed in New York against the White Star Line, by RMS Titanic survivor Mauritz Håkan Björnström-Steffansson, for financial compensation resulting from the loss of the painting. The amount of the claim was $100,000 ($2.4 million equivalent in 2014); a valuation which reflected Blondel's significant artistic status at that time and making it by far the most highly valued single item of luggage or cargo lost as a result of the sinking.

== Gallery ==
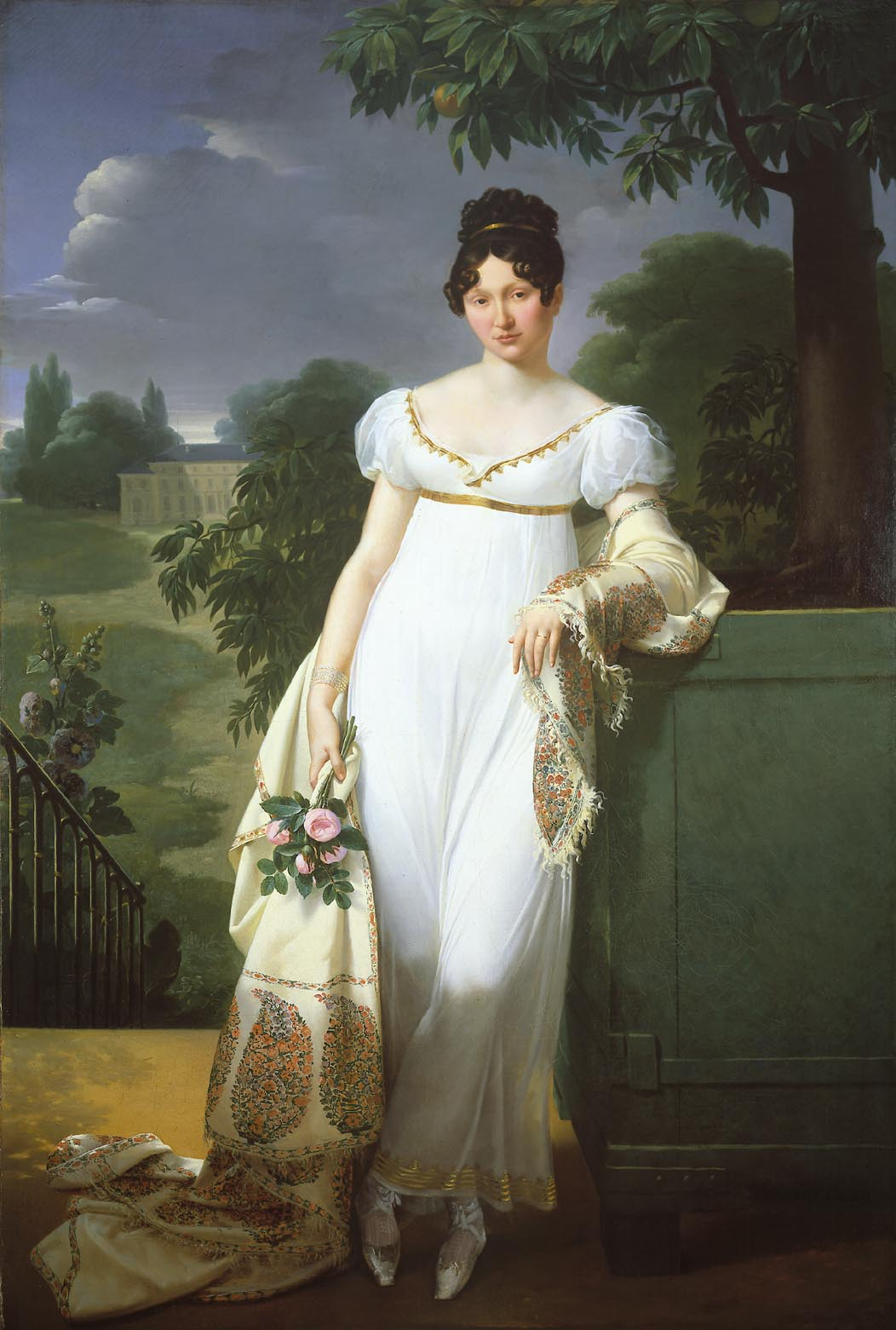
Félicité de Constance, 1808

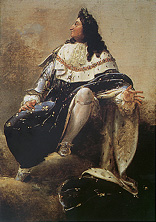
Louis XIV, 1827

Richard Coeur de Lion, 1841

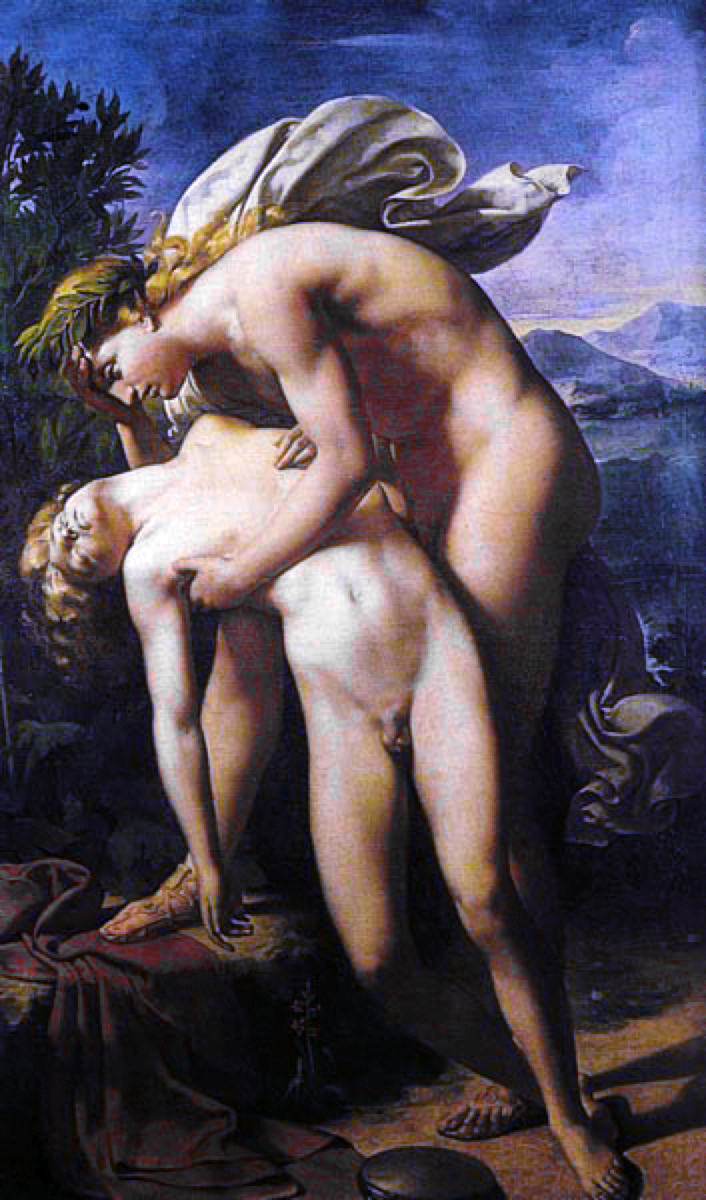
The death of Hyacinthus, (date unknown)

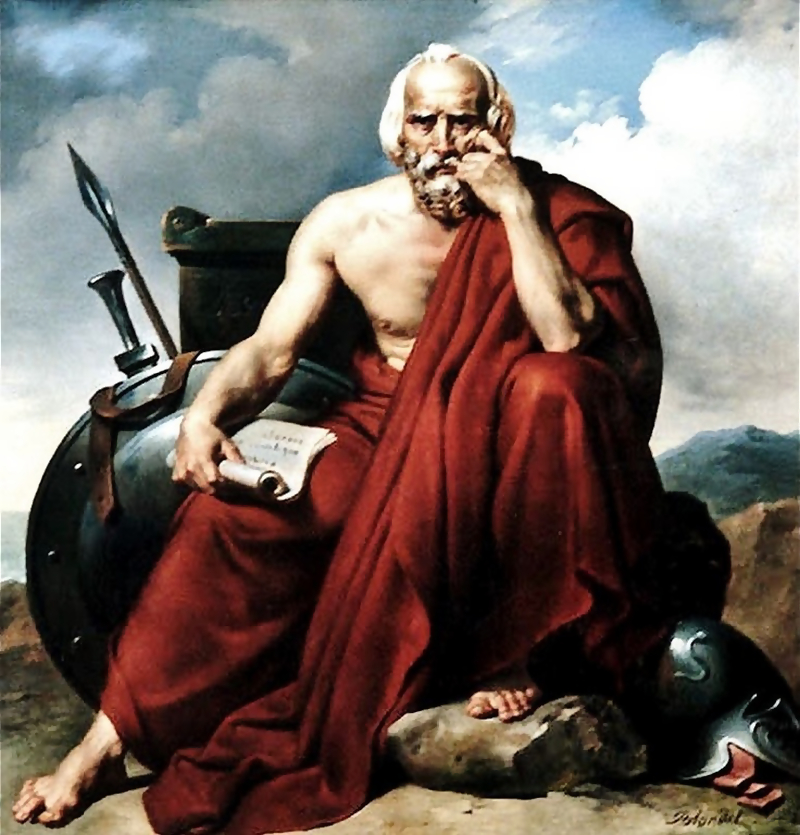
Lycurgus of Sparta, 1828

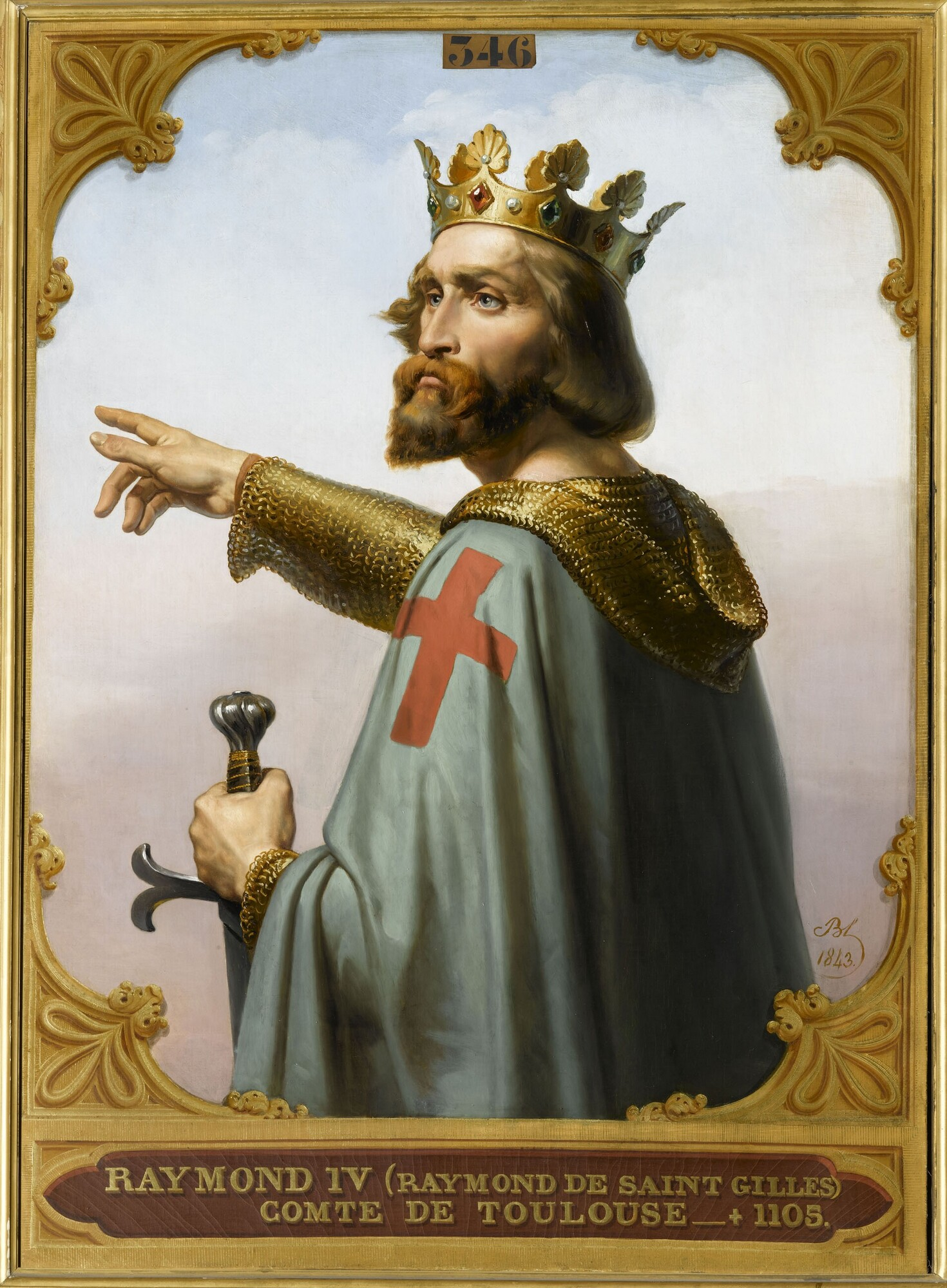
Raymond IV, Count of Toulouse, 1843

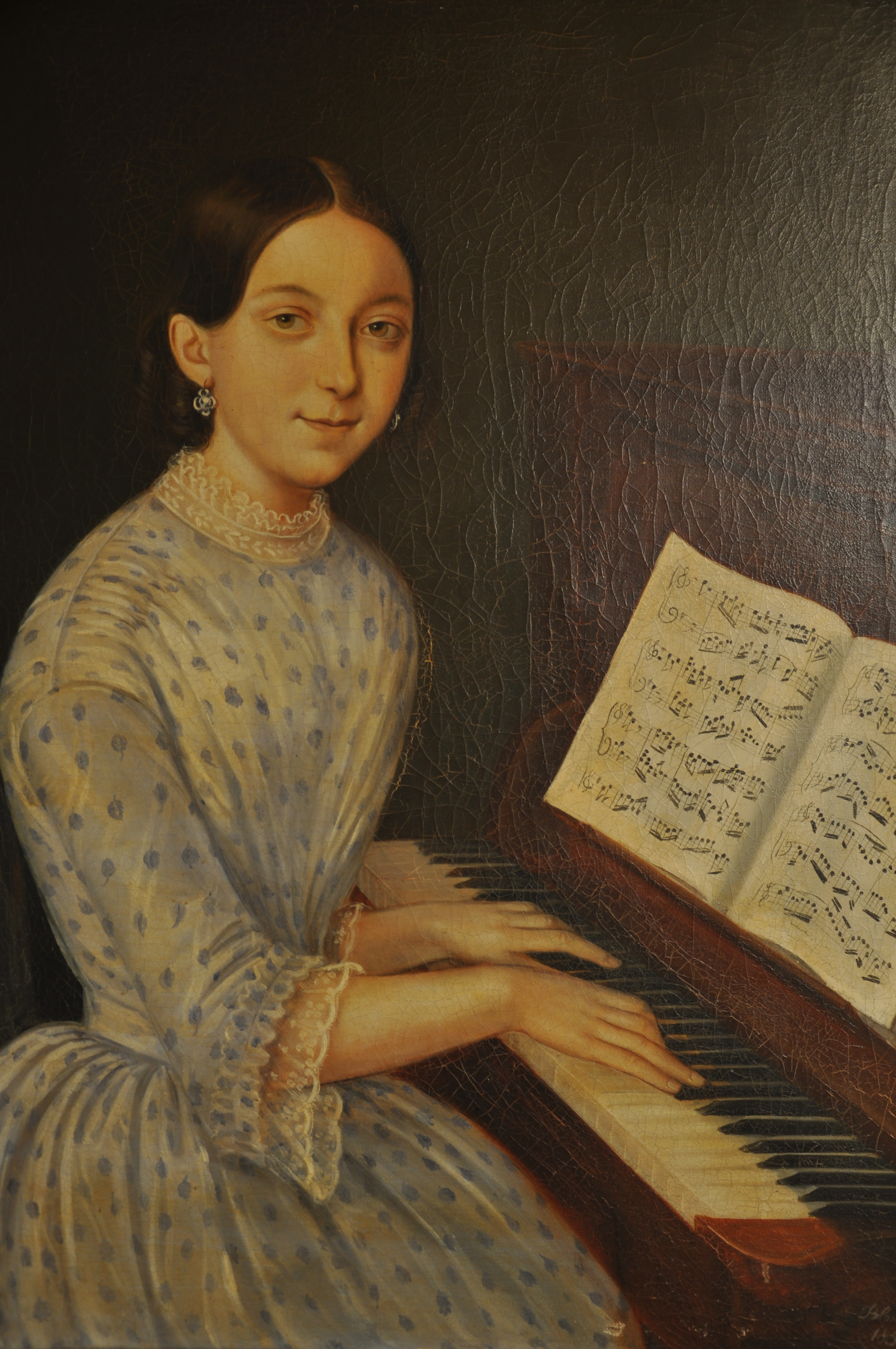
La Pianiste, 1851 (Private Collection)

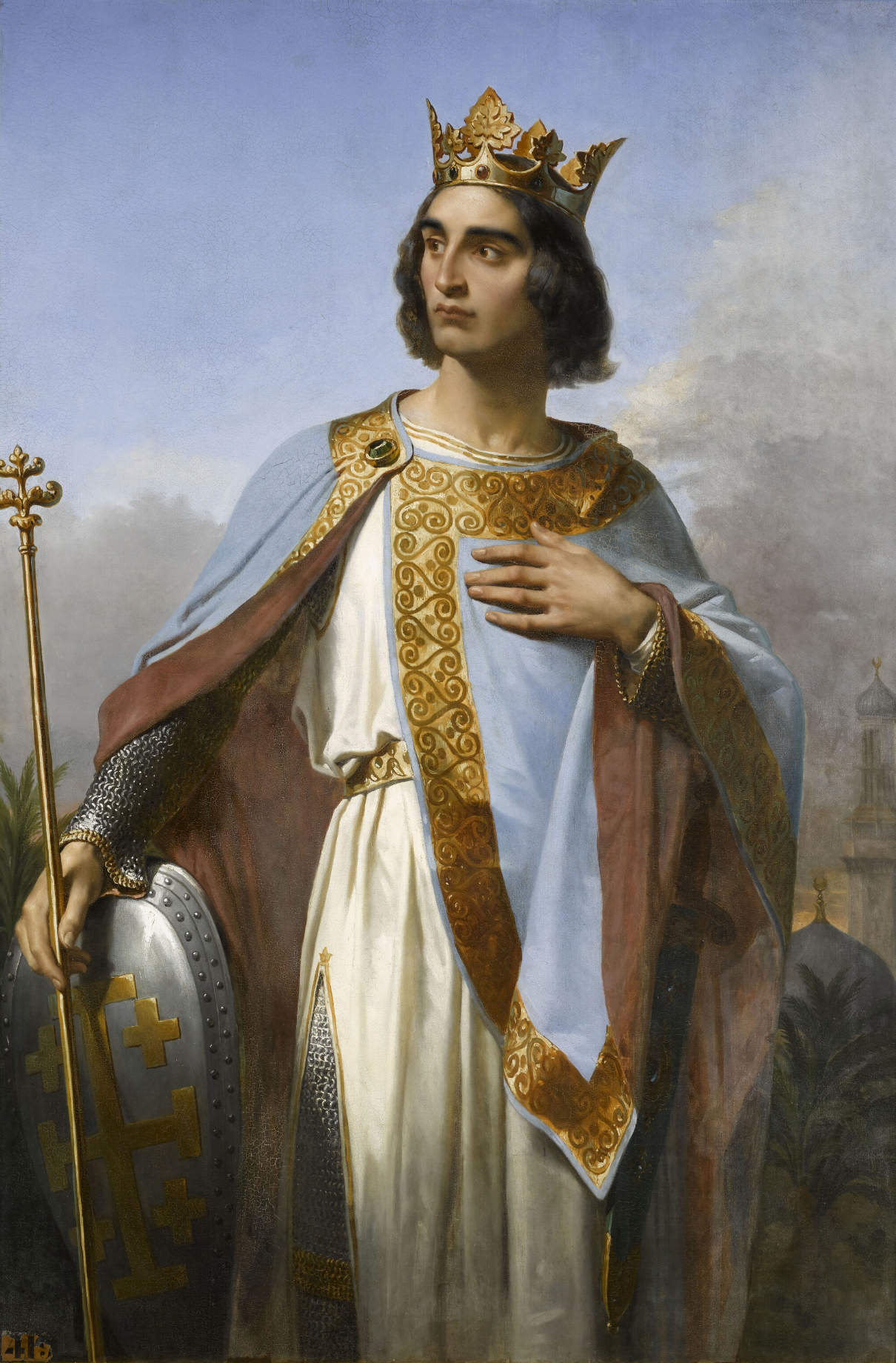
Baldwin I, King of Jerusalem, 1844

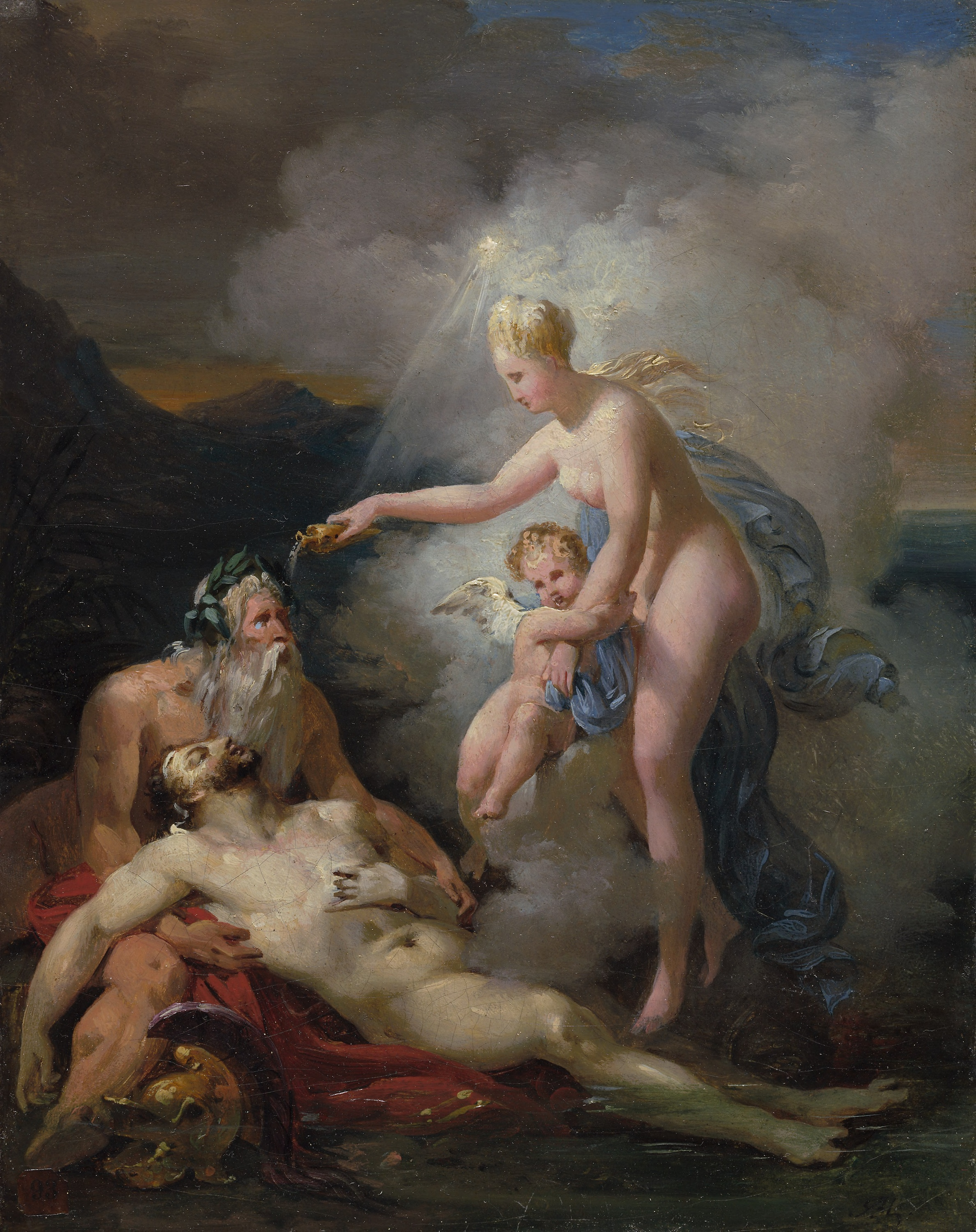
Venus healing Aeneas, 1820
