= The Origin of Sculpture =

Painting by Jean-Baptiste Regnault

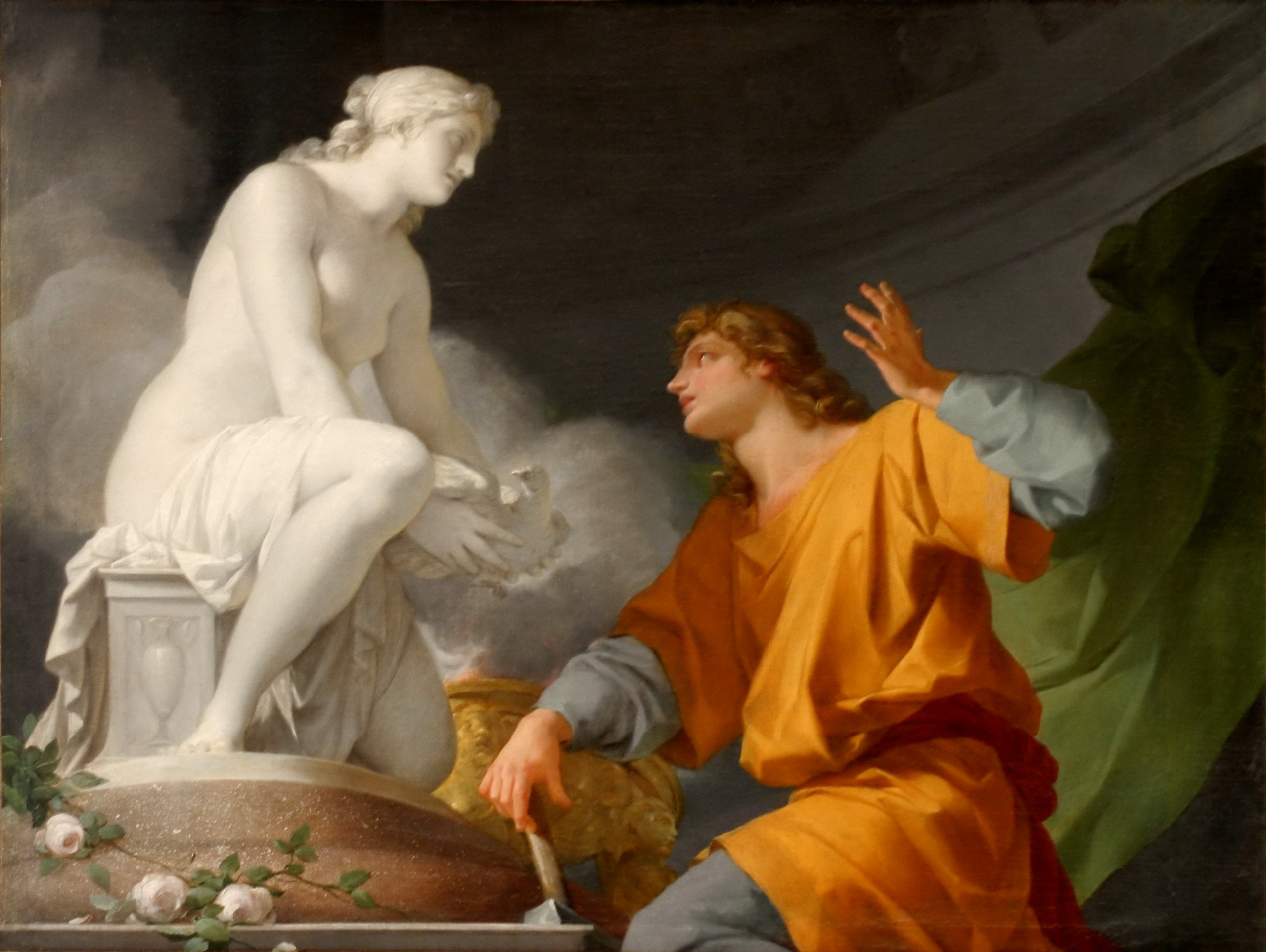
- Artist: Jean-Baptiste Regnault
- Year: 1786
- Type: Oil on canvas, history painting
- Dimensions: 120 cm × 140 cm (47 in × 55 in)
- Location: Palace of Versailles, Versailles

The Origin of Sculpture (French: L'Origine de la sculpture) is a 1786 history painting by the French artist Jean-Baptiste Regnault. It depicts the legend of Pygmalion from Greek Mythology. The work is also known by the alternative title Pygmalion Praying Venus to Animate His Statue. Reganult created a pendant painting The Origin of Painting.

Reganult had trained under the pioneering Neoclassical painter Joseph-Marie Vien and was of his most noted pupils along with François-André Vincent and Jacques-Louis David. The painting was commissioned by Louis XVI to hang in his wife Marie Antoinette's Salon des Nobles at the Palace of Versailles. It was displayed at the Salon of 1785 at the Louvre in Paris, possibly in an unfinished state as it wasn't formally completed until the following year. It was formally transferred to the Louvre in 1793 following the French Revolution. It was in the collection of Fontainebleau Palace for many years before returning to the Louvre in 1944. Today the painting is in the collection of the Museum of French History at the Palace of Versailles.

== Bibliography ==
- Crow, Thomas. Murder in the Rue Marat: A Case of Art in Revolution. Princeton University Press, 2005.
- Mansfield, Elizabeth C. The Perfect Foil: François-André Vincent and the Revolution in French Painting. University of Minnesota Press, 2011.
