= Andromeda's Return =

1782 painting by Jean-Baptiste Regnault

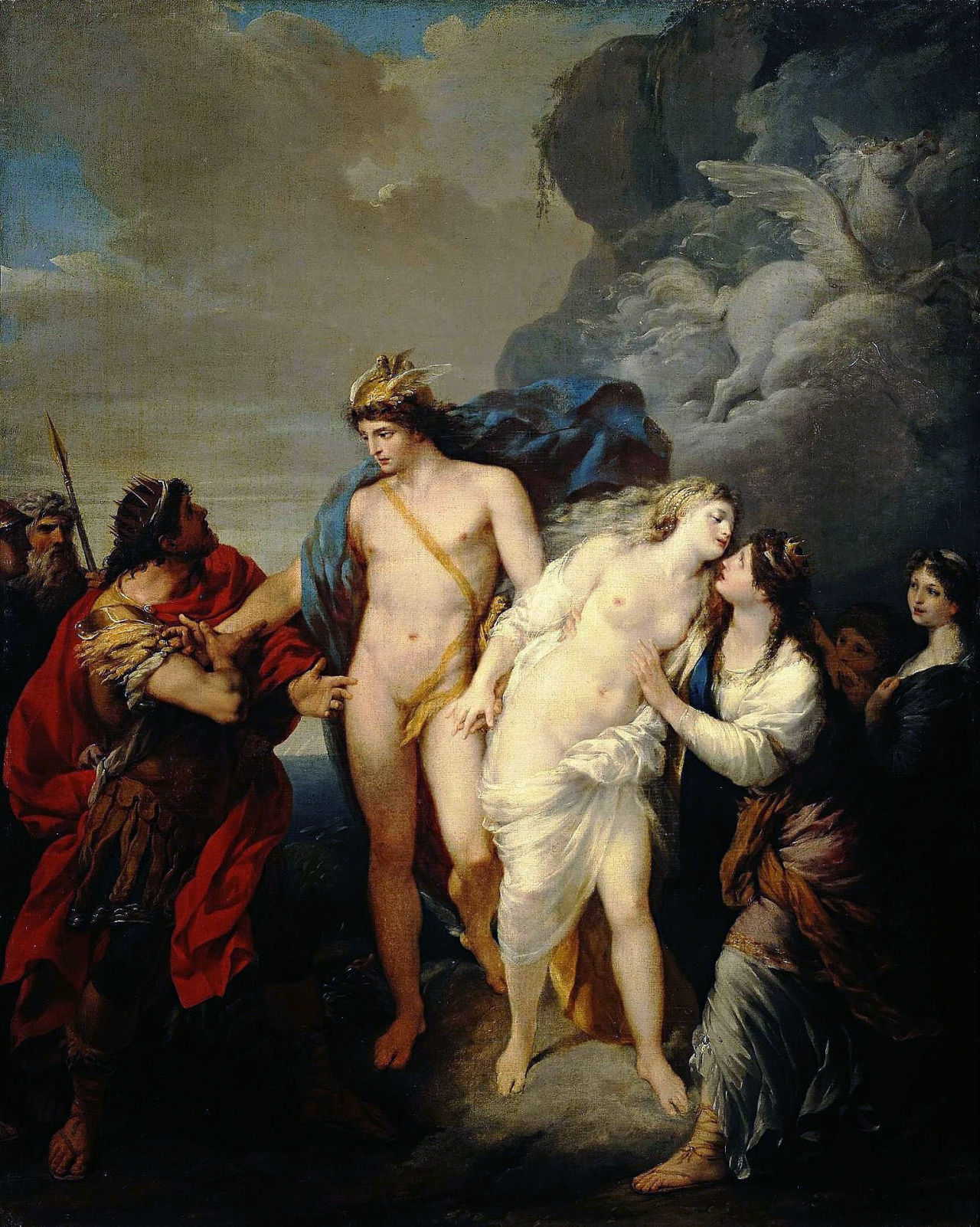
- Artist: Jean-Baptiste Regnault
- Year: 1782
- Type: Oil on canvas, history painting
- Dimensions: 90 cm × 72 cm (35 in × 28 in)
- Location: Hermitage Museum, Saint Petersburg

Andromeda's Return (French: Persée et Andromède) is an oil on canvas history painting by the French artist Jean-Baptiste Regnault, from 1782.

== History and description ==
It depicts a scene from Greek Mythology. Escorted by Perseus, Andromeda is returned to her parents, Cepheus and Cassiopeia. It follows on from the well-known scene when he rescues her while she is chained to a rock and threatened by the sea monster Cetus. Distinctly Neoclassical in style, the entwined fingers of the couple suggest that they will soon marry.

Regnault had been a pupil of Joseph-Marie Vien and a contemporary and rival of Jacques-Louis David and François-André Vincent. He was awarded the Prix de Rome in 1776. After returned from Italy he began work on this large work. He submitted this and another Neoclassical work, The Education of Achilles, to the Salon of 1783 held at the Louvre, in Paris. While the original was later destroyed, a smaller replica produced at the same time is now in the collection of the Hermitage Museum, in Saint Petersburg. It was acquired in 1919 following the Russian Revolution via the art collector A.K. Rudanovsky.

The Hermitage also holds a sequel painting The Marriage of Perseus and Andromeda, which also feature at the 1783 Salon.

== Bibliography ==
- Gaze, Delia. Dictionary of Women Artists: Volume 1. Fitzroy Dearborn Publishers, 1997.
- Locquin, Jean. La peinture d'histoire en France de 1747 à 1785. H. Laurens, 1912.
- Mansfield, Elizabeth C. The Perfect Foil: François-André Vincent and the Revolution in French Painting. University of Minnesota Press, 2011.
