= Anne Nicole Voullemier =

French painter (1796–1886)

Anne Nicole Voullemier, also called Mademoiselle Voullemier (1796–1886) was a French painter and lithographer. She signed her name Mlle Voullemier.

== Biography ==
Anne Nicole Voullemier was born in Châtillon-sur-Seine. She was a student of Jean-Baptiste Regnault for oil painting, and of Louis-François Aubry for miniature painting.

She exhibited her miniature portraits at the Salon from 1817 to 1835.

In 1817, she exhibited Une soubrette écoutant à une porte (A maid listening at a door), miniature bought by the Duchess of Berry and La sœur de charité. In 1819, she exhibited Portrait of M. Collin, grand vicar, in 1822, Sisters of Charity visiting a sick person and The Curious. In 1824, she presented The confessional. The productions of Mlle. Voullemier often appeared at the exhibitions of Douai, Lille and Cambrai. She made lithographs of several of her paintings, among them The Sister of Charity, The Clergyman Consoling a Prisoner, and The Fortune Tellers.

She gave lessons in oil painting and miniature painting.

She won the 3rd class medal at the 1835 Salon, worth 250 gold francs, and the 2nd class medal at the Salon of 1845, worth 500 gold francs.

== Works ==
Works of this artist can be seen in the Musée des Beaux-Arts de Caen, the Musée d'Art et d'Histoire de Saint-Brieuc and the Musée Barrois in Bar-le-Duc.

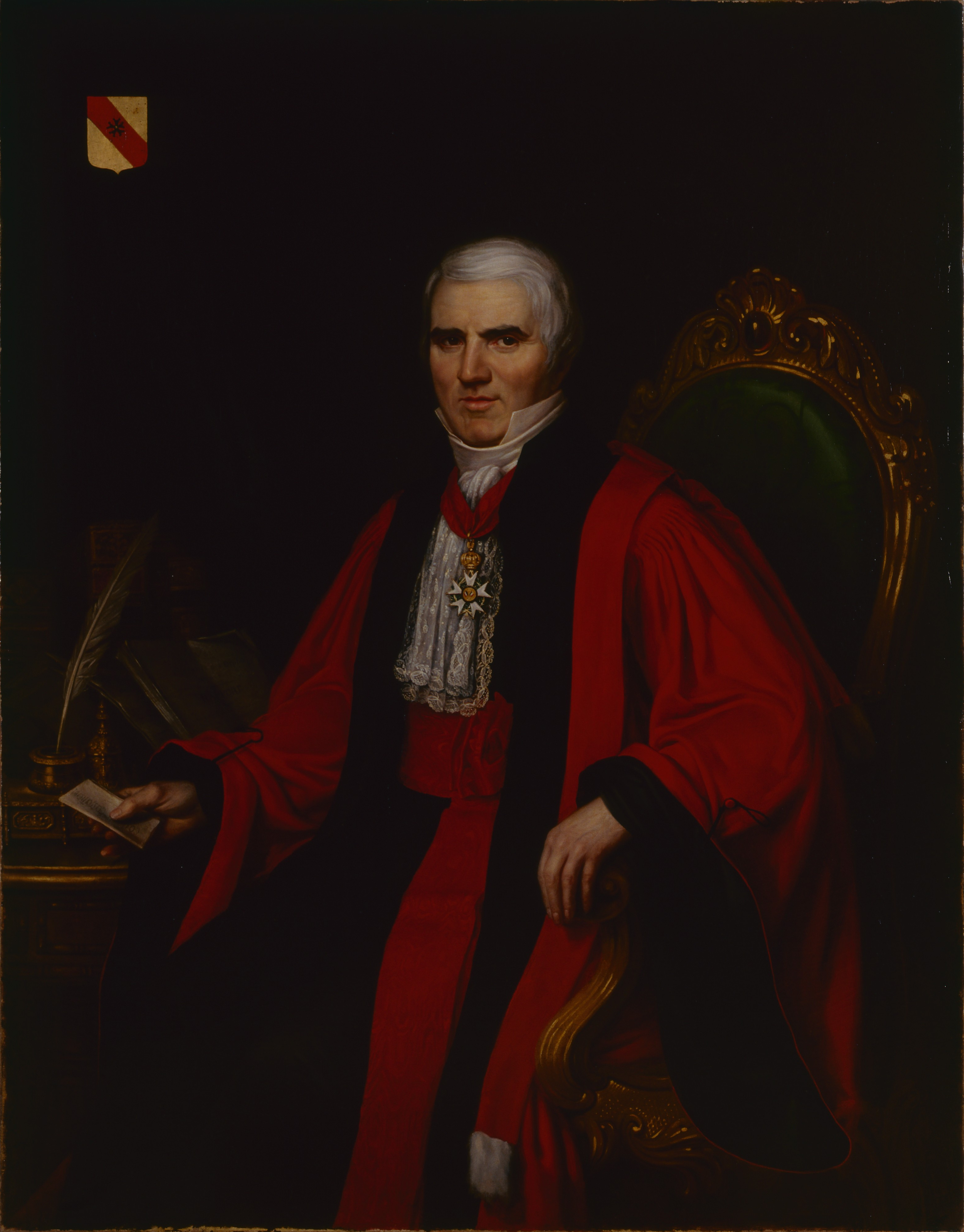
Portrait of Olivier Rupérou, 1844, Musée d'art et d'histoire de Saint-Brieuc.
