= Louis-François Aubry =

French painter

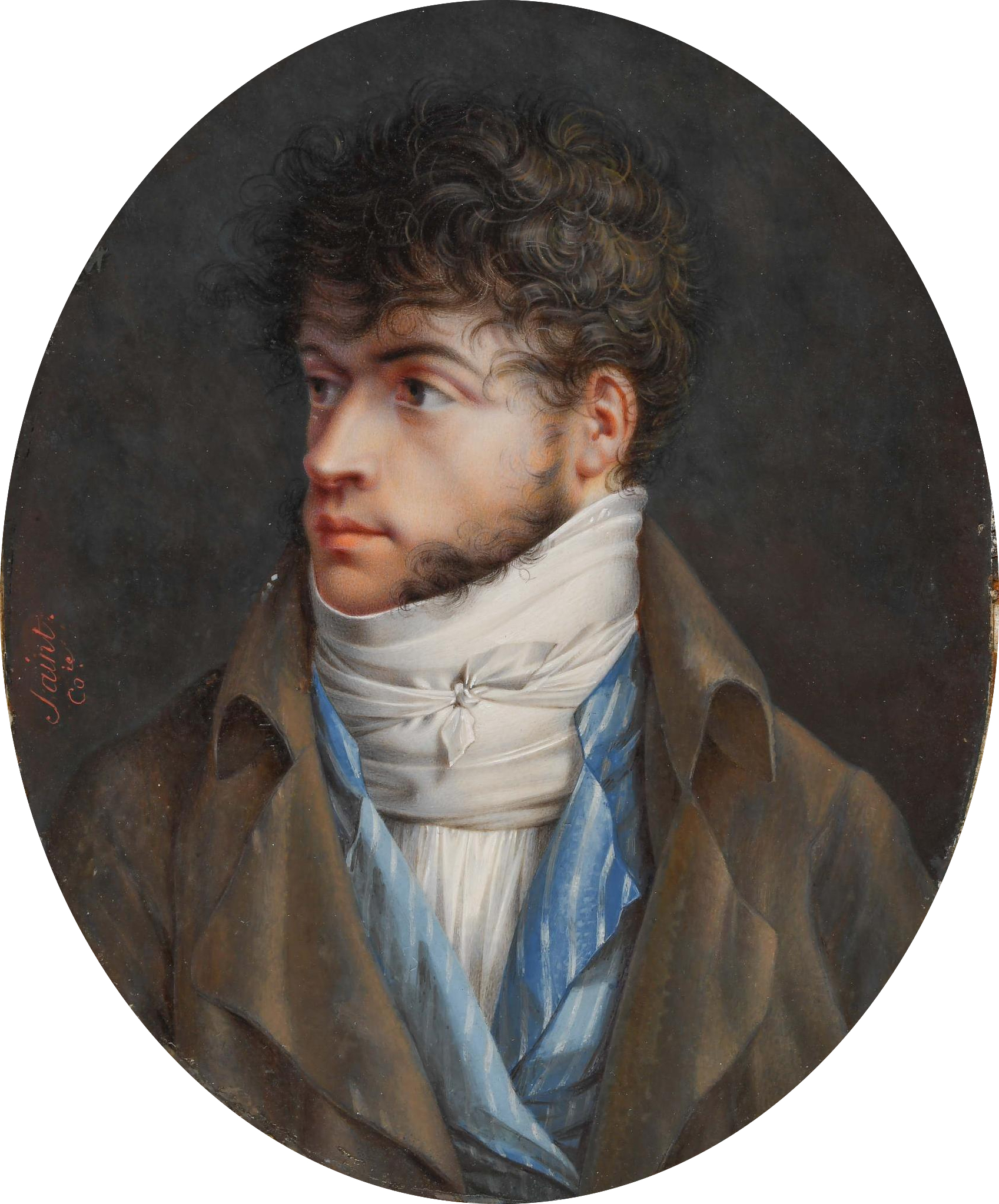
Self-portrait (copy by Daniel Saint)

Louis-François Aubry (French pronunciation: [lwi fʁɑ̃swa obʁi]; 1770 – ca. 1850) was a French painter. He was born in Paris, studied under Vincent and Isabey, and became celebrated as a portrait painter. He exhibited at the Salon of 1810 portraits of the King and Queen of Westphalia, which were praised for their colouring.

One of his students was Anne Nicole Voullemier.
