= Jean-Baptiste Regnault =

French painter (1754–1829)

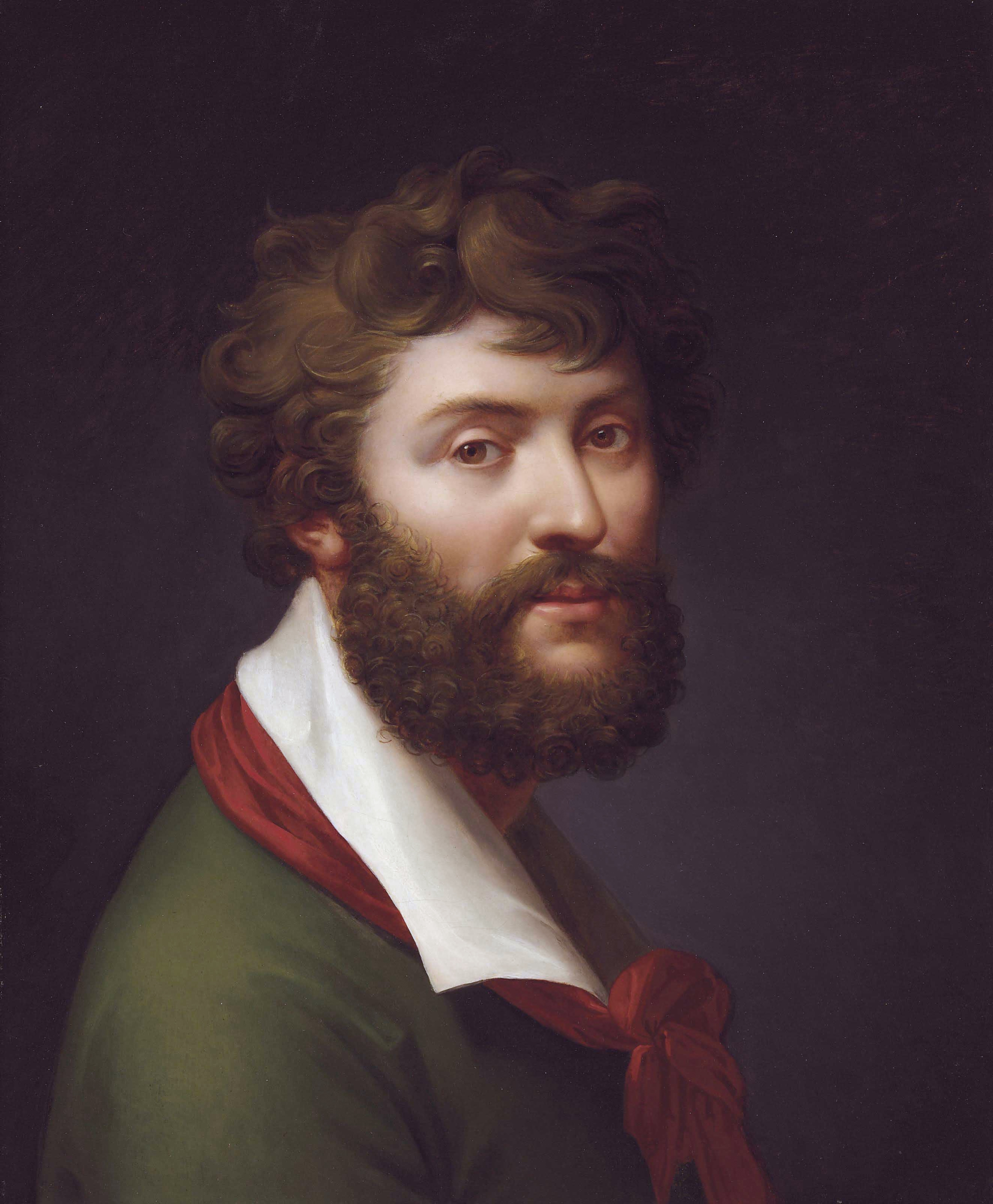
Self-Portrait, c. 1793–1794, sold at Christie's in June 2011

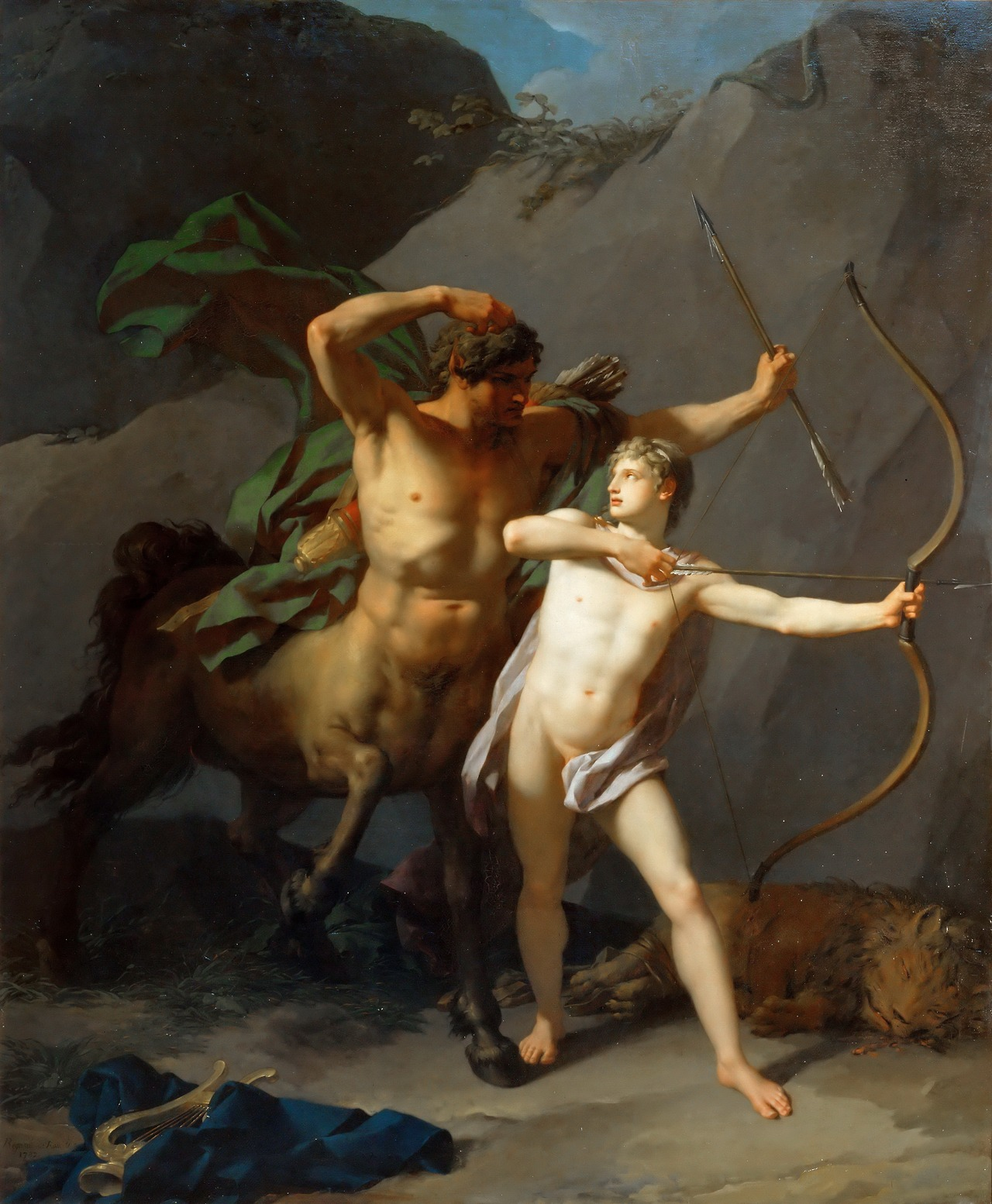
The Education of Achilles by Chiron the Centaur, 1782, Louvre, Paris

Jean-Baptiste Regnault (French pronunciation: [ʒɑ̃ batist ʁəɲo]; 9 October 1754 – 12 November 1829) was a French painter.

== Biography ==
Regnault was born in Paris, and began life at sea in a merchant vessel. At the age of fifteen his talent attracted attention, and he was sent to Italy by M. de Monval under the care of Jean Bardin. After his return to Paris in 1776, Regnault won the Prix de Rome for his painting Alexandre and Diogène and in 1783 he was elected to the French Académie des Beaux-Arts. His diploma picture, The Education of Achilles by Chiron the Centaur is now in the Louvre, as also are his Trois Grâces, Le Déluge, Descente de croix (Christ taken down from the Cross, originally executed for the royal chapel at Fontainebleau) and Socrate arrachant Alcibiade du sein de la Volupté. His L'origine de la peinture and L'origine de la sculpture, ou Pygmalion amoureux de sa statue are now at the Palace of Versailles.

He was the author of many large historical paintings, especially of allegorical subjects. His school, which reckoned amongst its attendants Pierre-Narcisse Guérin, Louis-Philippe Crépin, Louis Lafitte, Merry-Joseph Blondel, Robert Lefèvre, Henriette Lorimier and Alexandre Menjaud, was for a long while the rival in influence of that of David. Besides Blondel, Guérin, Lefèvre and Lorimier, Regnault's students included Godefroy Engelmann, Louis Hersent, Charles Paul Landon, Hippolyte Lecomte, Jacques Réattu, Jean-Hilaire Belloc and Anne Nicole Voullemier.

Regnault was married first to Sophie Meyer, then Sophie Félicité Beaucourt. He died in Paris. He is buried in Père-Lachaise Cemetery.

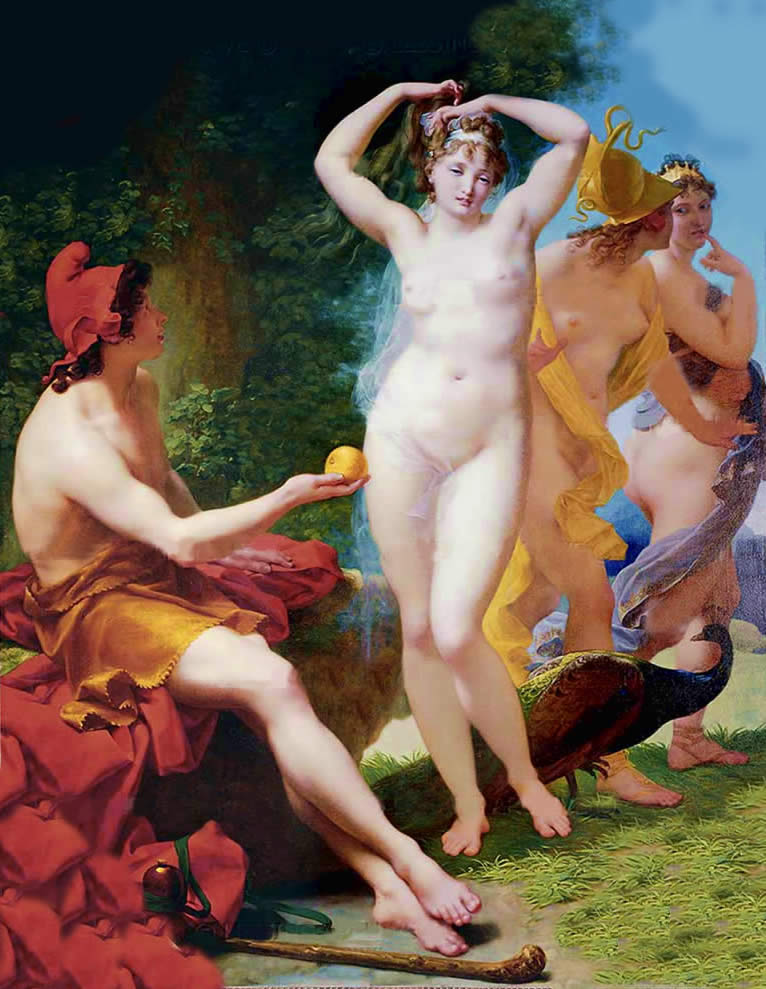
The Judgement of Paris (Staatsgalerie)

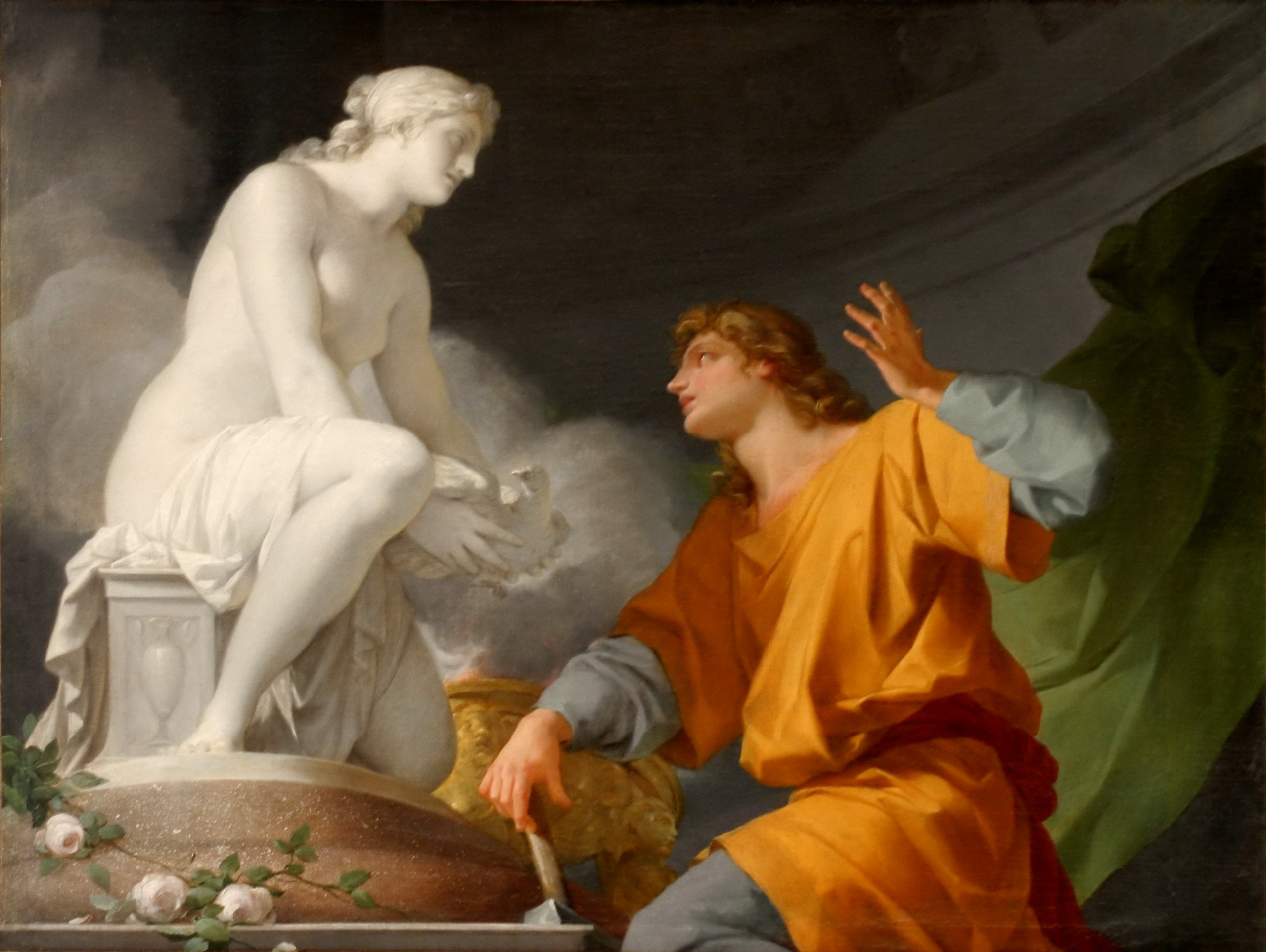
The Origin of Sculpture, 1786, Palace of Versailles

== Selected works ==
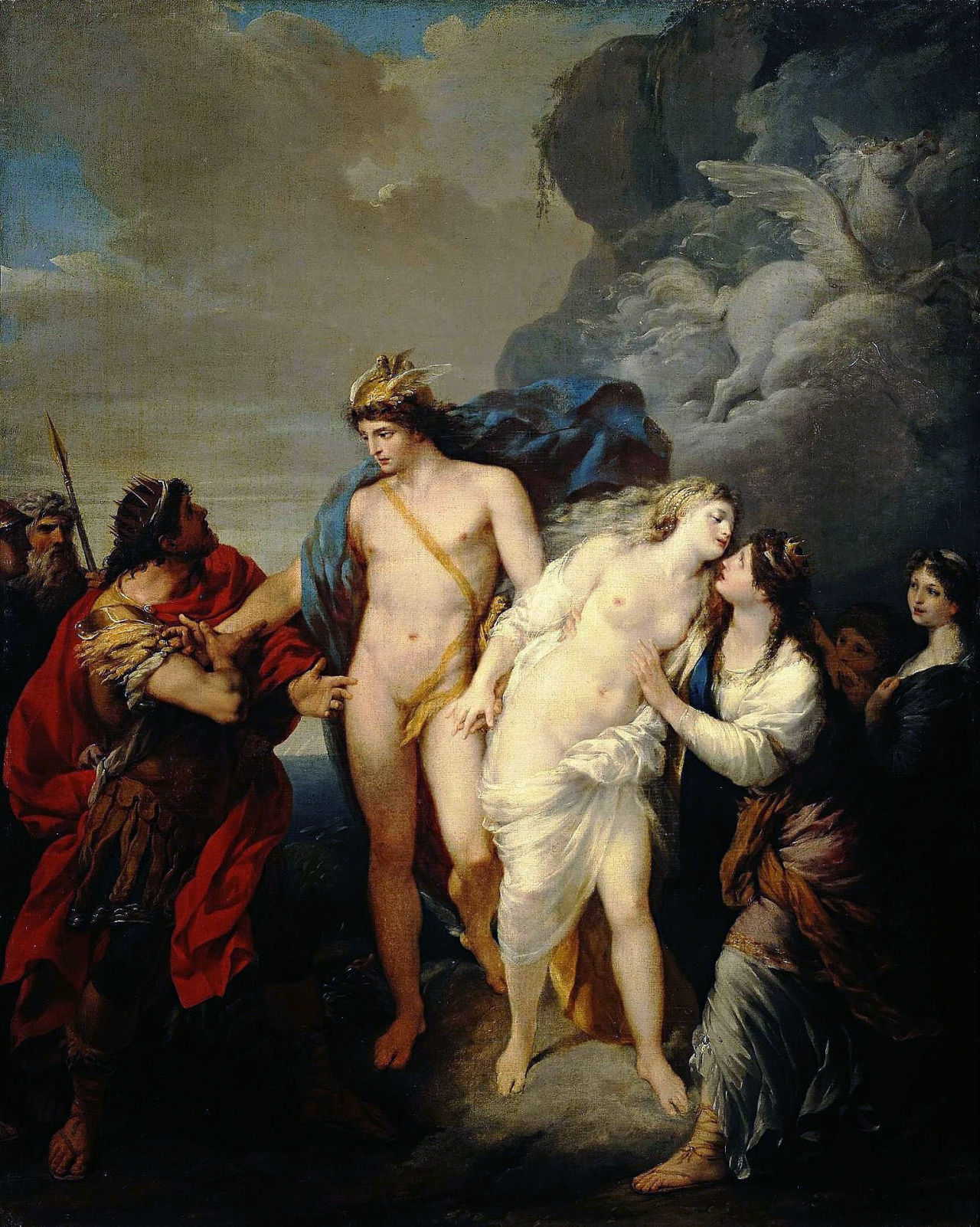
Andromeda's Return, 1782

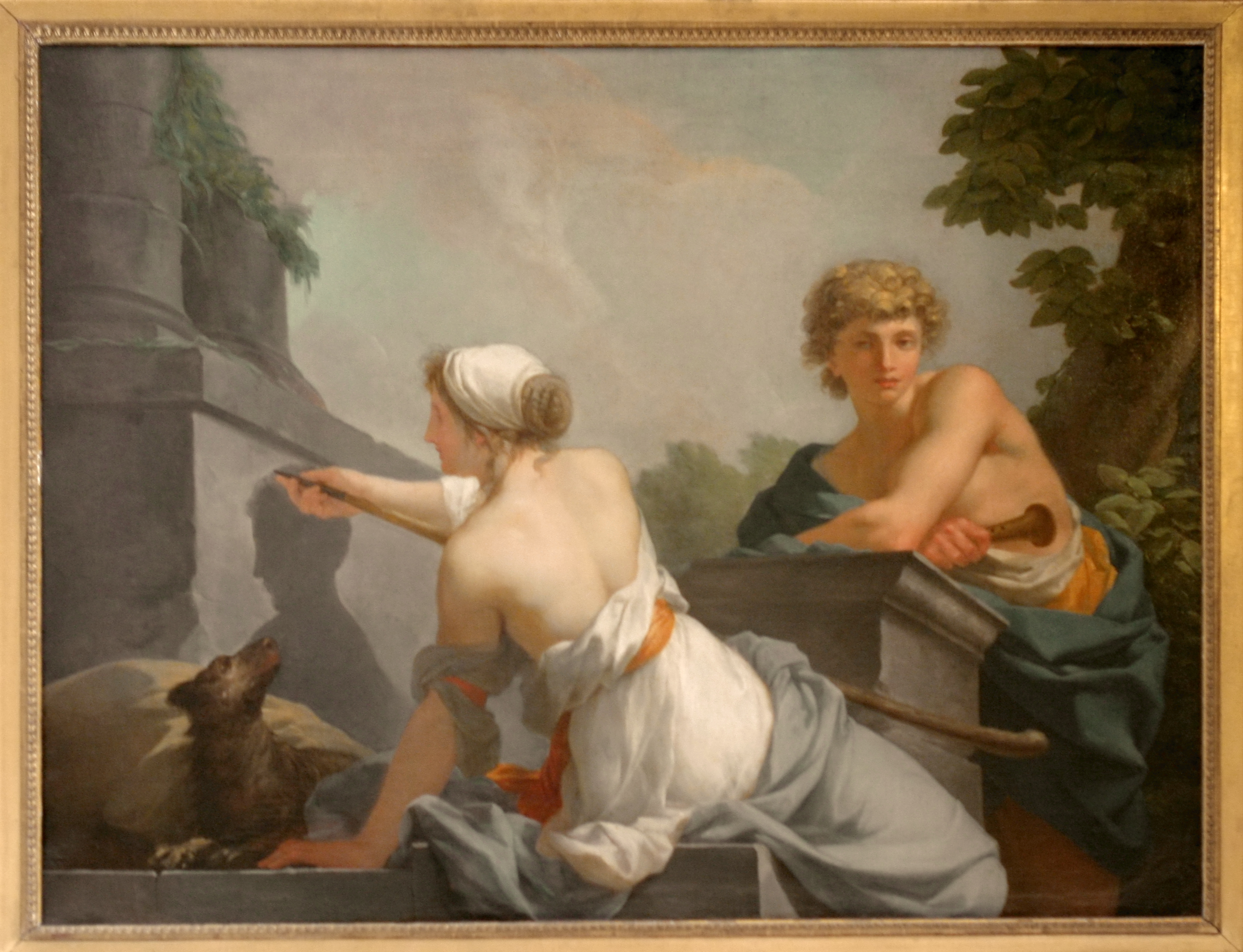
The Origin of Painting, 1785

- Alexandre et Diogène, ou Diogéne Visité par Alexandre (1776)
- L'Éducation d'Achille par le centaure Chiron (1782), Musée du Louvre
- L'origine de la peinture (1786), Palace of Versailles
- The Origin of Sculpture (1786), Palace of Versailles
- Oreste et Iphigénie en Tauride (1787)
- Déscente de Croix (1789), Musée du Louvre
- Le Déluge (1789/91), Musée du Louvre
- Socrate arrachant Alcibiade des bras de la Volupté (1791), Musée du Louvre
- La Liberté ou la Mort (1795), Kunsthalle Hamburg
- Les Trois Grâces (1799), Musée du Louvre
- Desaix recevant la mort à la bataille de Marengo (1801)
- Napoléon au camp de Boulogne (1804), Museo Napoleónico (Havana)
- La Marche triomphale de Napoléon Ier vers le temple de l'immortalité (1804)
- Mariage du prince Jérôme et de la princesse de Wurtemberg (1810)
- The Judgement of Paris (1812), Detroit Institute of Art, donation from Cristina and Henry Ford II
- La Toilette de Vénus (1815), National Gallery of Victoria
- L'Amour et l'Hymen buvant dans la coupe de l'Amitié (1820), Meaux, Musée Bossuet, gift of Professeur Changeux
- Jupiter et Io (1827), Musée des Beaux-Arts de Brest
- Cupidon et Psyché (1828)
