= Benjamin West =

American-born British painter (1738–1820)

Benjamin West PRA
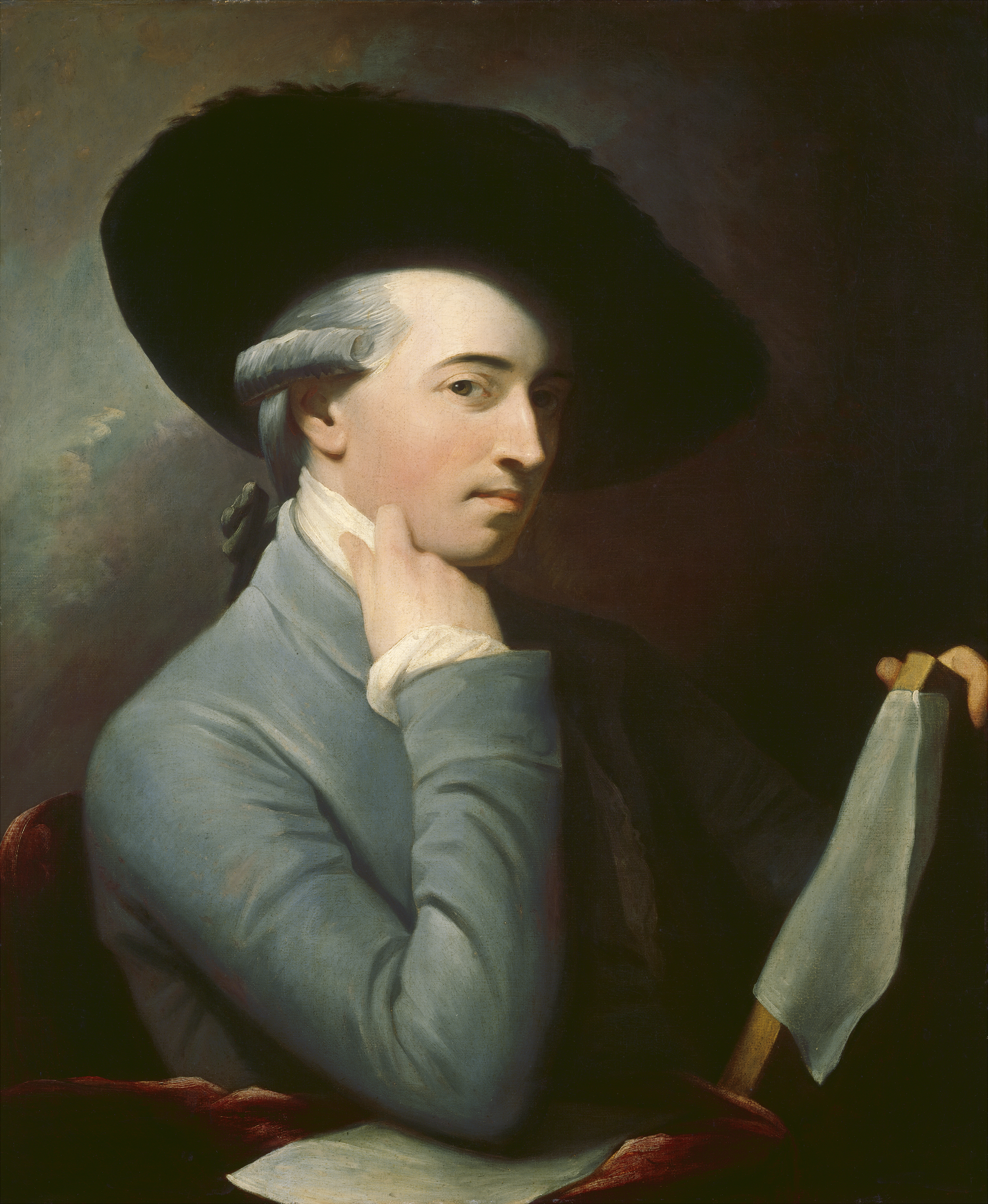
- Self-portrait, c. 1763
- Born: 10 October 1738; Springfield, Pennsylvania, British America
- Died: 11 March 1820 (aged 81); London, England
- Known for: History painting
- Patrons: William Henry; George III

Benjamin West PRA (10 October 1738 – 11 March 1820) was an American-born British painter who specialised in history painting, creating such works as The Death of Nelson, The Death of General Wolfe, the Treaty of Paris, and Benjamin Franklin Drawing Electricity from the Sky.

Entirely self-taught, West soon gained valuable patronage and toured Europe, eventually settling in London. He impressed King George III and was largely responsible for the launch of the Royal Academy, of which he became the second president (after Sir Joshua Reynolds). He was appointed historical painter to the court and Surveyor of the King's Pictures.

West also painted religious subjects, as in his huge work The Preservation of St Paul after a Shipwreck at Malta, at the Chapel of St Peter and St Paul at the Old Royal Naval College in Greenwich, and Christ Healing the Sick, presented to the National Gallery.

== Early life and education ==
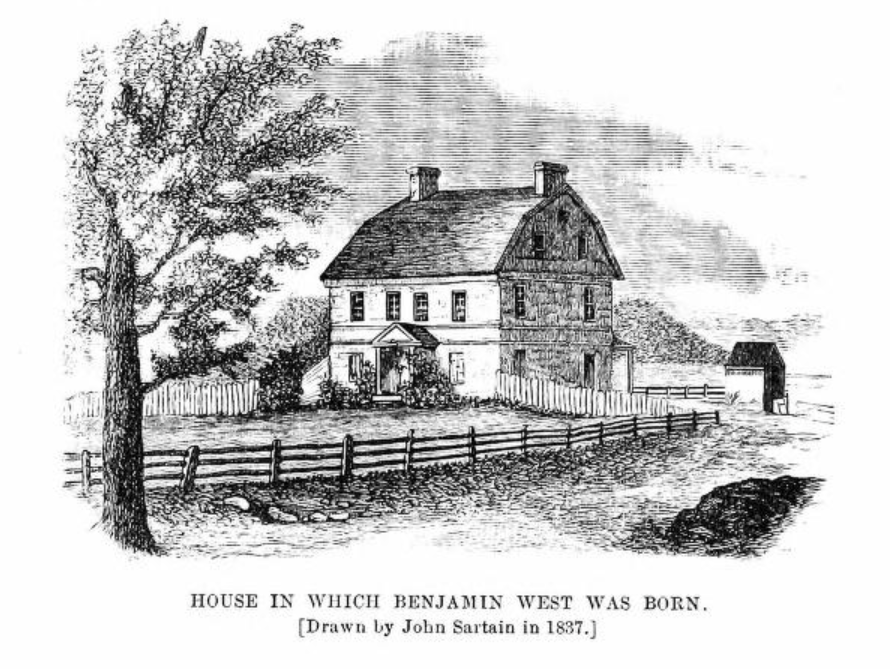
The house in which West was born in Springfield, Pennsylvania, drawn by John Sartain in 1837

External videos
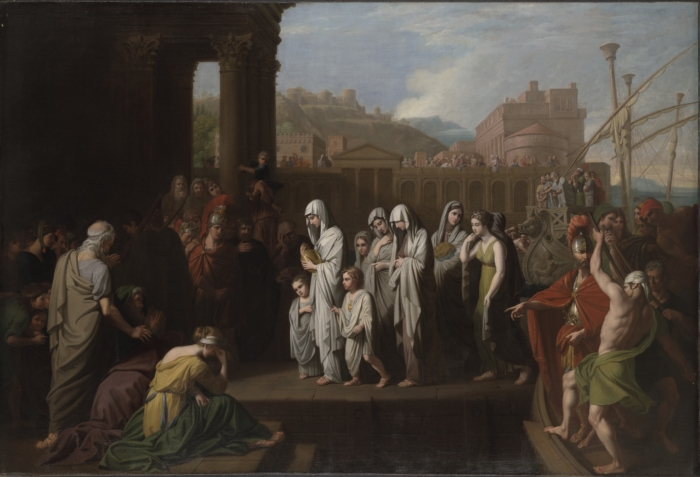
- Introducing Benjamin West, Royal Academy of Art
- Lecture 7. Benjamin West's Agrippina Landing at Brundisium with the Ashes of Germanicus, 57:08, Yale University

West was born in Springfield, Pennsylvania, in a house, now located in Swarthmore on the campus of Swarthmore College. He was the tenth child of an innkeeper, John West (1690–1776), and his wife, Sarah Pearson (1697–1756).

The family later moved to Newtown Square, Pennsylvania, where his father was the proprietor of the Square Tavern, still standing in that town.

West told the novelist John Galt, with whom, late in his life, he collaborated on a memoir, The Life and Studies of Benjamin West (1816, 1820), that, when he was a child, Native Americans showed him how to make paint by mixing some clay from the river bank with bear grease in a pot. West was an autodidact; while excelling at the arts, "he had little [formal] education and, even when president of the Royal Academy, could scarcely spell". One day, his mother left him alone with his little sister Sally. Benjamin discovered some bottles of ink and began to paint Sally's portrait. When his mother came home, she noticed the painting, picked it up and said, "Why, it's Sally!", and kissed him. Later, he noted, "My mother's kiss made me a painter". He received further art training from the artisan painter William Williams.

== Career ==
From 1746 to 1759, West worked in Pennsylvania, mostly painting portraits. While West was in Lancaster in 1756, his patron, a gunsmith named William Henry, encouraged him to paint a Death of Socrates based on an engraving in Charles Rollin's Ancient History. His resulting composition, which significantly differs from the source, has been called "the most ambitious and interesting painting produced in colonial America". William Smith, then the provost of the College of Philadelphia, saw the painting in Henry's house and decided to become West's patron, offering him education and, more importantly, connections with wealthy and politically connected Pennsylvanians. During this time, West met John Wollaston, a famous painter who had emigrated from London. West learned Wollaston's techniques for painting the shimmer of silk and satin, and also adopted some of "his mannerisms, the most prominent of which was to give all his subjects large almond-shaped eyes, which clients thought very chic".

West was a close friend of Benjamin Franklin, whose portrait he painted. Franklin was the godfather of West's second son, Benjamin.

=== Italian tour ===
Sponsored by Smith and William Allen, then reputed to be the wealthiest man in Philadelphia, West travelled to Italy in 1760 in the company of the Scot William Patoun, a painter who later became an art collector. In common with many artists, architects, and lovers of the fine arts at that time he conducted a Grand Tour. West expanded his repertoire by copying works of Italian painters such as Titian and Raphael direct from the originals.

In Rome, he met a number of international neo-classical artists including German-born Anton Rafael Mengs, Scottish Gavin Hamilton, and Austrian Angelica Kauffman.

=== England ===
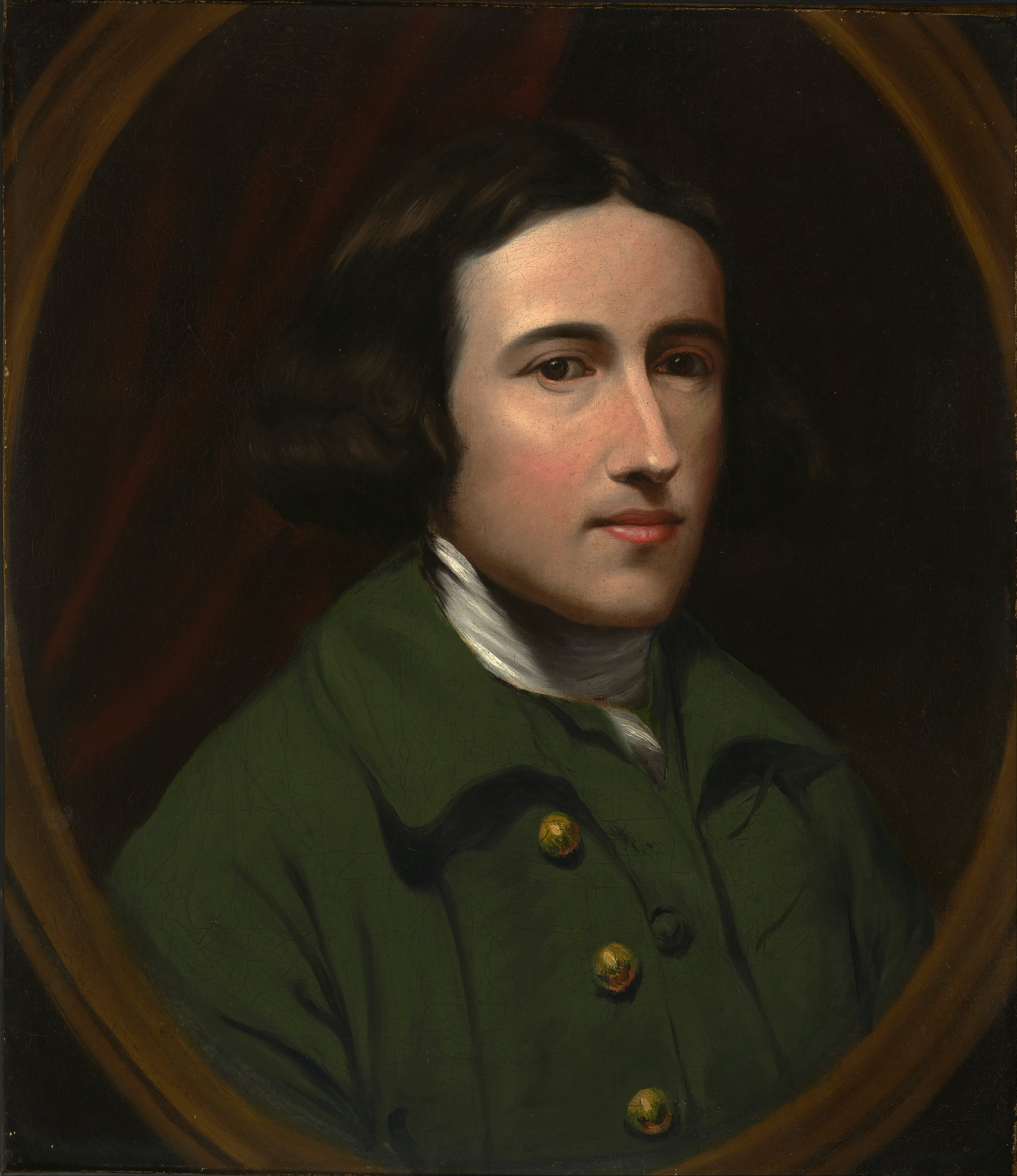
Portrait of West from 1770, now housed in the National Portrait Gallery in Washington, D.C.

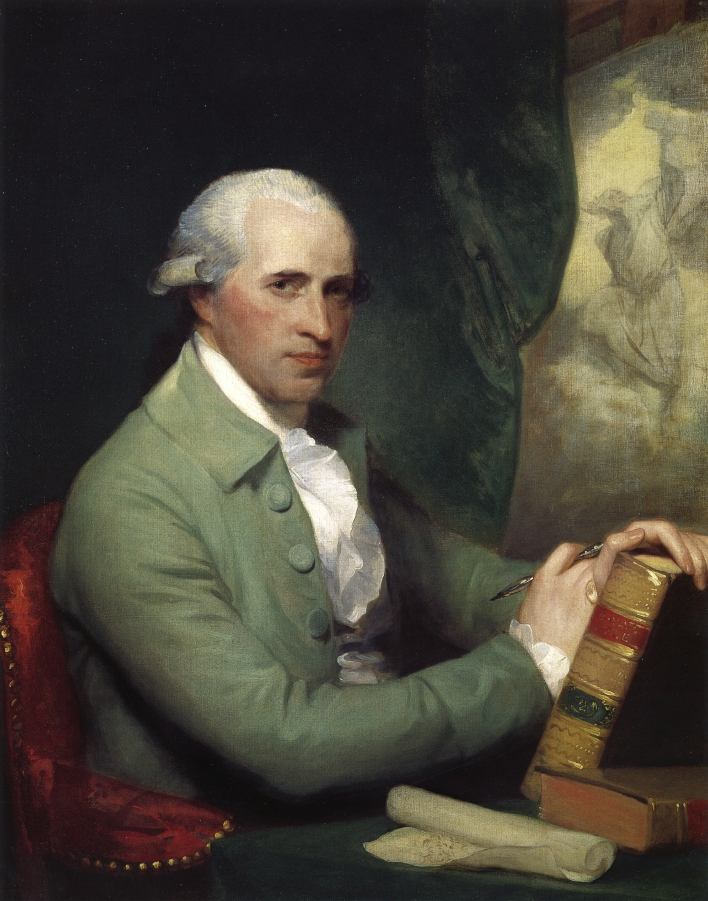
Portrait of Benjamin West by Gilbert Stuart, 1785

In August 1763, West arrived in England, on what he initially intended as a visit on his way back to America. In fact, he never returned to America. He stayed for a month at Bath with William Allen, who was also in the country, and visited his half-brother Thomas West at Reading at the urging of his father. In London he was introduced to Richard Wilson and his student Joshua Reynolds. He moved into a house in Bedford Street, Covent Garden. The first picture he painted in England, Angelica and Medora, along with the Portrait of Robert Monckton, and his Cymon and Iphigenia, painted in Rome, were shown at the exhibition Society of Artists in Spring Gardens in 1764.

In 1765, he married Elizabeth Shewell, an American he knew from Philadelphia, at St Martin-in-the-Fields.

William Markham, then headmaster of Westminster School, introduced West to Samuel Johnson, Edmund Burke, Thomas Newton, Bishop of Bristol, James Johnson, Bishop of Worcester, and Robert Hay Drummond, Archbishop of York. All three prelates commissioned work from him. In 1766 West proposed a scheme to decorate St Paul's Cathedral with paintings. It was rejected by Richard Terrick, the Bishop of London, but his idea of painting an altarpiece for St Stephen Walbrook was accepted. At around this time he also received acclaim for his classical subjects, such as Pylades and Orestes and The Continence of Scipio.

West was known in England as the "American Raphael". His Raphaelesque painting of Archangel Michael Binding the Devil is in the collection of Trinity College, Cambridge. He said that "Art is the representation of human beauty, ideally perfect in design, graceful and noble in attitude."

==== Royal patronage ====
Drummond tried to raise subscriptions to fund an annuity for West, so that he could give up portraiture and devote himself entirely to more ambitious compositions. Having failed in this, he tried—with greater success—to convince King George III to patronise West. West was soon on good terms with the king, and the two men conducted long discussions on the state of art in England, including the idea of the establishment of a Royal Academy. The academy came into being in 1768, with West one of the primary leaders of an opposition group formed out of the existing Society of Artists of Great Britain; Joshua Reynolds was its first president. In the same year, he was elected to membership of the American Philosophical Society. In a story related by Henry Angelo I (1756–1835) in his book of reminiscences, the actor David Garrick, who was a friend of Angelo's father, the Italian sword master Domenico Angelo, memorably sketched for the teenaged Henry the following exchange: one day the painter Francesco Zuccarelli, on one of his visits to Domenico, got into a dispute with his fellow royal academician Johan Zoffany about the merit of West's 1769 painting The Departure of Regulus, his first commission for the king. Zuccarelli exclaimed, "Here is a painter who promises to rival Nicolas Poussin", while Zoffany tauntingly replied, "A figo for Poussin, West has already beaten him out of the field."

In 1772, King George appointed him historical painter to the court at an annual fee of £1,000. He painted a series of eight large canvases showing episodes from the life of Edward III for St George's Hall at Windsor Castle, and proposed a cycle of 36 works on the theme of "the progress of revealed religion" for a chapel at the castle, of which 28 were eventually executed. The largest group of paintings (seven) from the series is currently in Greenville, South Carolina (Bob Jones University Museum & Gallery). He also painted nine portraits of members of the royal family, including two of the king himself. He was Surveyor of the King's Pictures from 1791 until his death.

=== The Death of General Wolfe ===
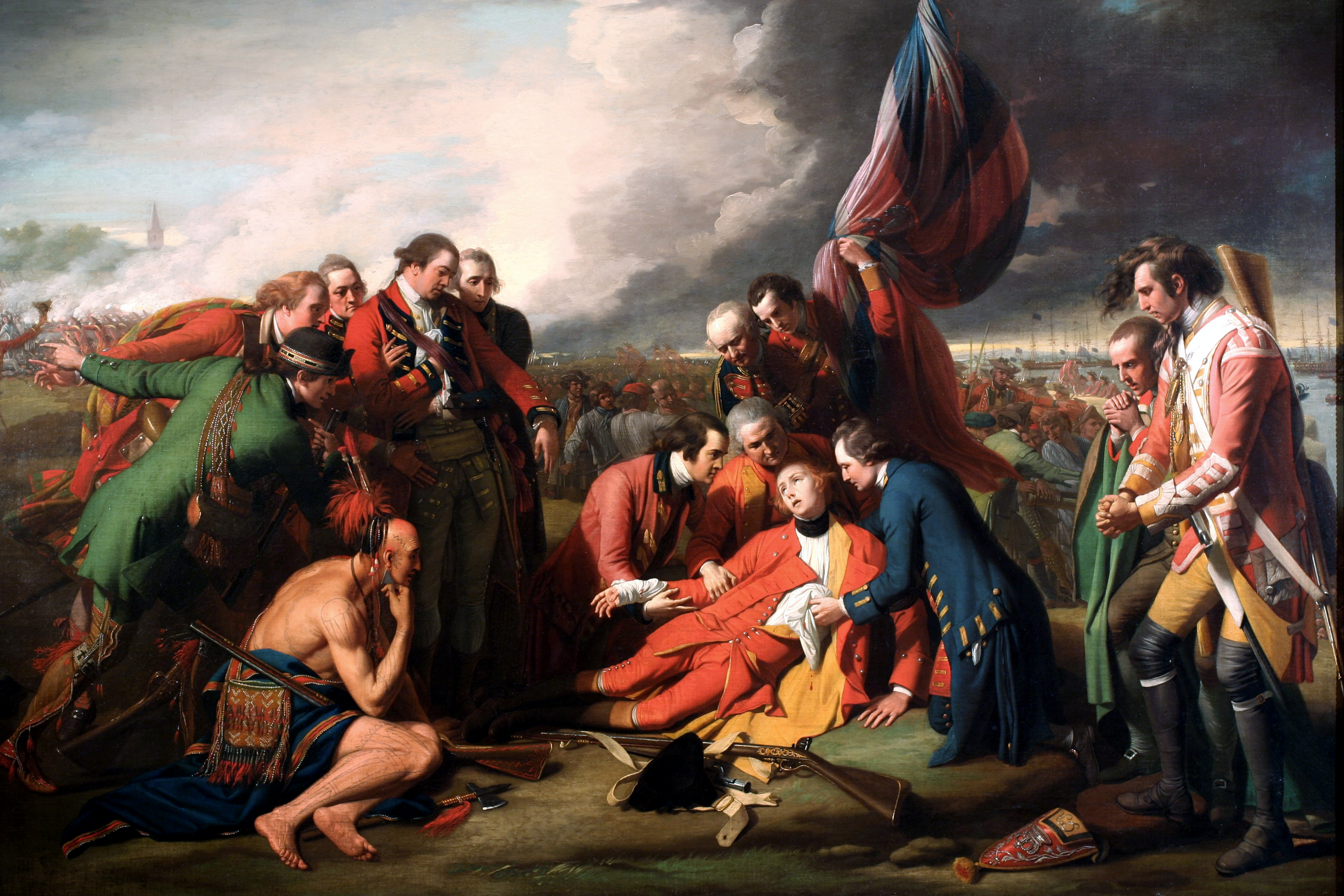
The Death of General Wolfe, 1770

West painted his most famous, and possibly most influential painting, The Death of General Wolfe, in 1770 and it was exhibited at the Royal Academy in 1771. The painting became one of the most frequently reproduced images of the period. It returned to the French and Indian War setting of his General Johnson Saving a Wounded French Officer from the Tomahawk of a North American Indian of 1768. When the American Revolution broke out in 1775 he remained ambivalent, and neither spoke out for nor against the Revolutionary War in his land of birth.

West became known for his large-scale history paintings, which use expressive figures, colours and compositional schemes to help the spectator to identify with the scene represented. West called this "epic representation". His 1778 work The Battle of the Boyne portrayed William of Orange's victory at the Battle of the Boyne in 1690, and strongly influenced subsequent images of William. In 1806, he produced The Death of Nelson, to commemorate Horatio Nelson's death at the Battle of Trafalgar.

=== Later religious painting ===
St Paul's Church, in the Jewellery Quarter, in Birmingham, has an important enamelled stained glass east window made in 1791 by Francis Eginton, modelled on an altarpiece painted c. 1786 by West, now in the Dallas Museum of Art. It shows the Conversion of Paul. He was elected a Foreign Honorary Member of the American Academy of Arts and Sciences in 1791.

West is also well known for his huge work in the Chapel of St Peter and St Paul, which now forms part of the Old Royal Naval College, in Greenwich, London. His work, The Preservation of St Paul after a Shipwreck at Malta, measures 25 by 14 ft (7.6 by 4.3 m) and illustrates the Acts of the Apostles: 27 & 28. West also provided the designs for the other paintings executed by Biagio Rebecca in the chapel.

Following a loss of royal patronage at the beginning of the 19th century, West began a series of large-scale religious works. The first, Christ Healing the Sick, was originally intended as a gift to Pennsylvania Hospital in Philadelphia; instead he sold it to the British Institution for £3,000, which in turn presented it to the National Gallery. West then made a copy to send to Philadelphia. The success of the picture led him to paint a series of even larger works, including his Death on the Pale Horse, exhibited in 1817.

=== Royal Academy ===
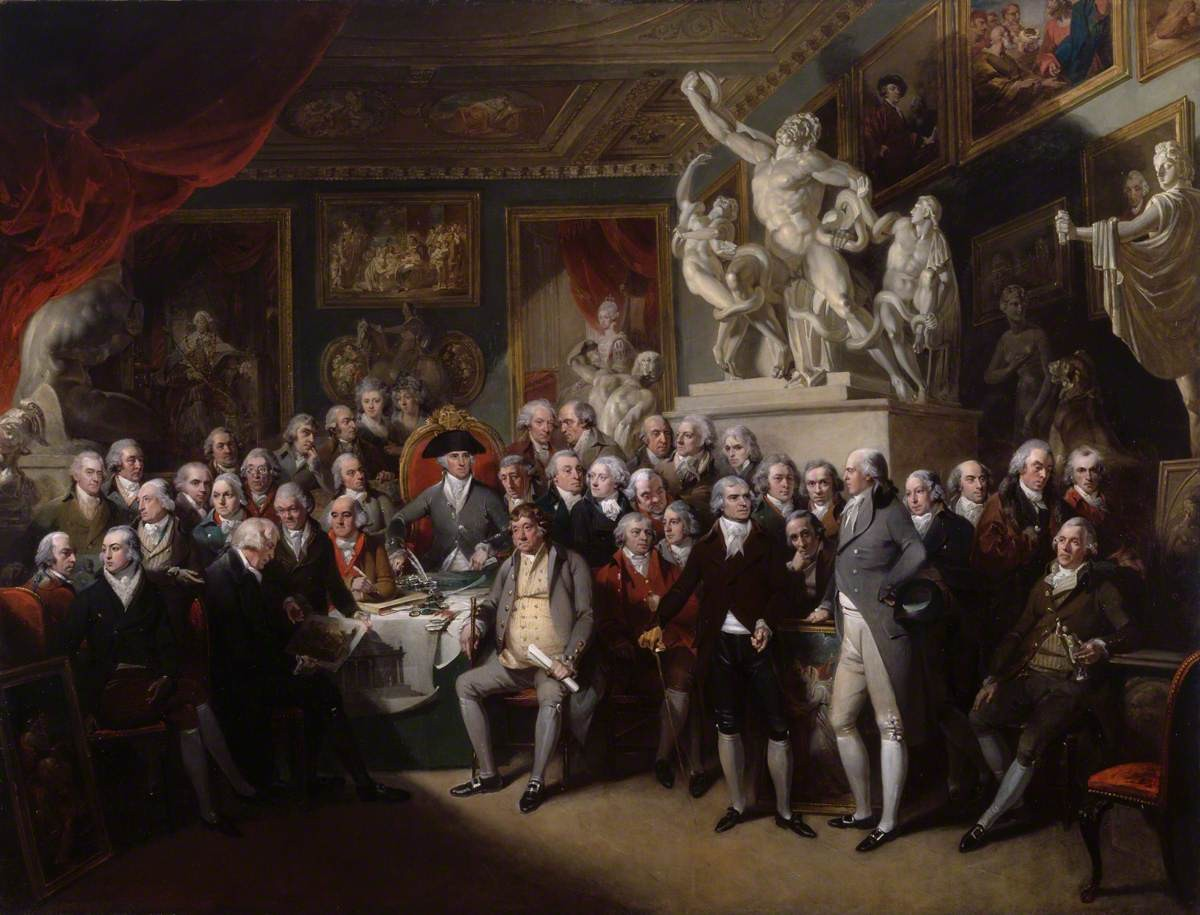
The Royal Academicians in General Assembly by Henry Singleton, 1795. West, as president, is seated in the centre surrounded by his colleagues.

Though initially snubbed by Sir Joshua Reynolds, founding President of the Royal Academy, and by some other Academicians who felt he was over-ambitious, West was elected President of the Royal Academy on the death of Reynolds in 1792. During his time as president, he fell victim to the Venetian secret, a scandal involving a supposedly secret set of materials and techniques used by Renaissance painters in Venice. He resigned in 1805, to be replaced by a fierce rival, the architect James Wyatt. However, West was again elected president the following year, and served until his death. In 1810 West was painted by his future successor Thomas Lawrence as president of the Royal Academy and the Portrait of Benjamin West was exhibited at the 1811 Summer Exhibition.

=== Pupils ===
Many American artists studied under him in London, including Ralph Earl and later his son, Ralph Eleaser Whiteside Earl, Samuel Morse, Robert Fulton, Charles Willson Peale, Rembrandt Peale, Matthew Pratt, Gilbert Stuart, John Trumbull, Samuel Lovett Waldo, Washington Allston, Thomas Sully, John Green, and Abraham Delanoy.

== Death ==
West died at his house in Newman Street in London, on 11 March 1820, and was buried in St Paul's Cathedral. He had been offered a knighthood by the British Crown, but declined it, believing that he should instead be made a peer.

== Gallery ==
The Cricketers, 1763

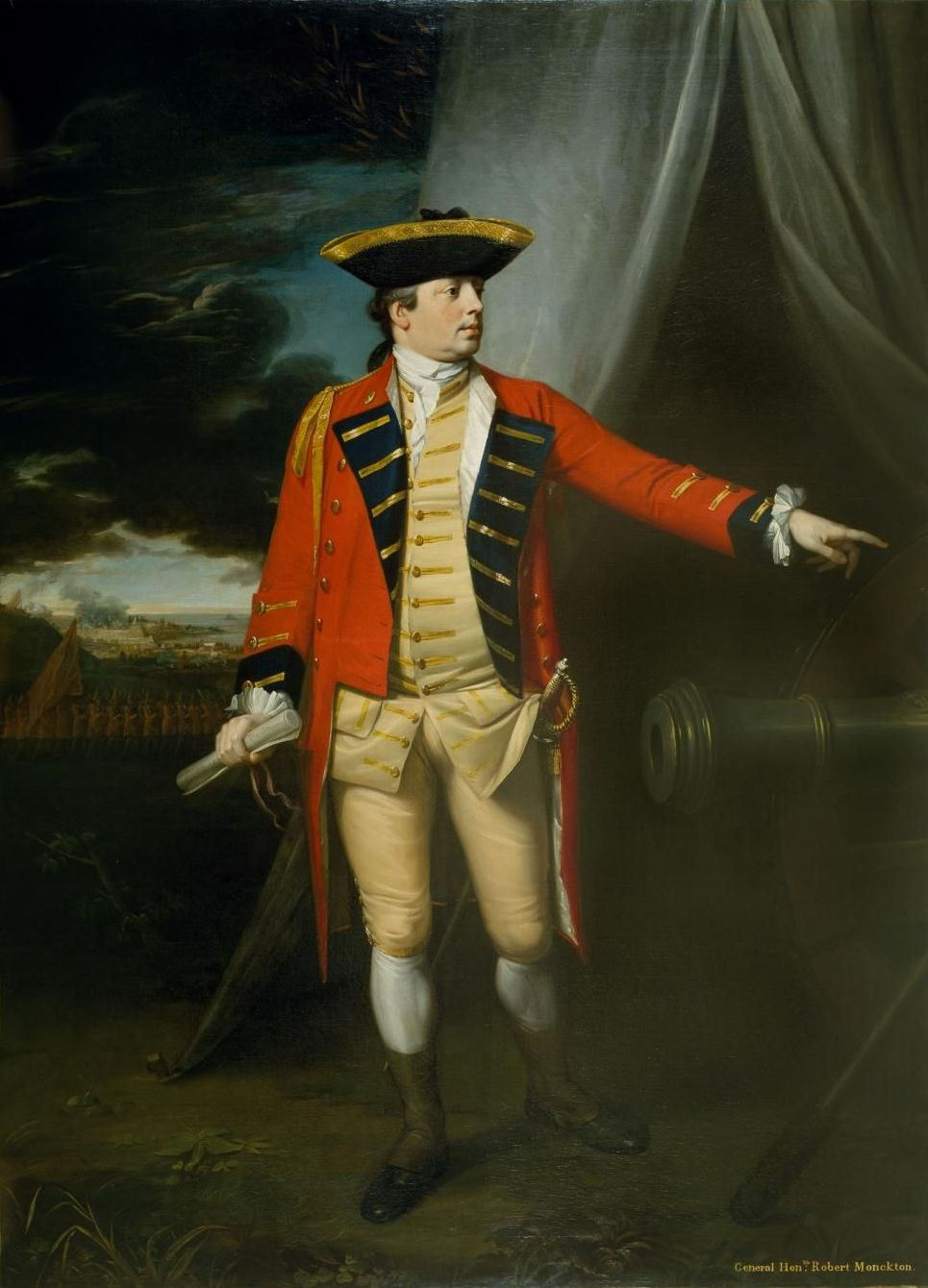
Portrait of Robert Monckton, 1763

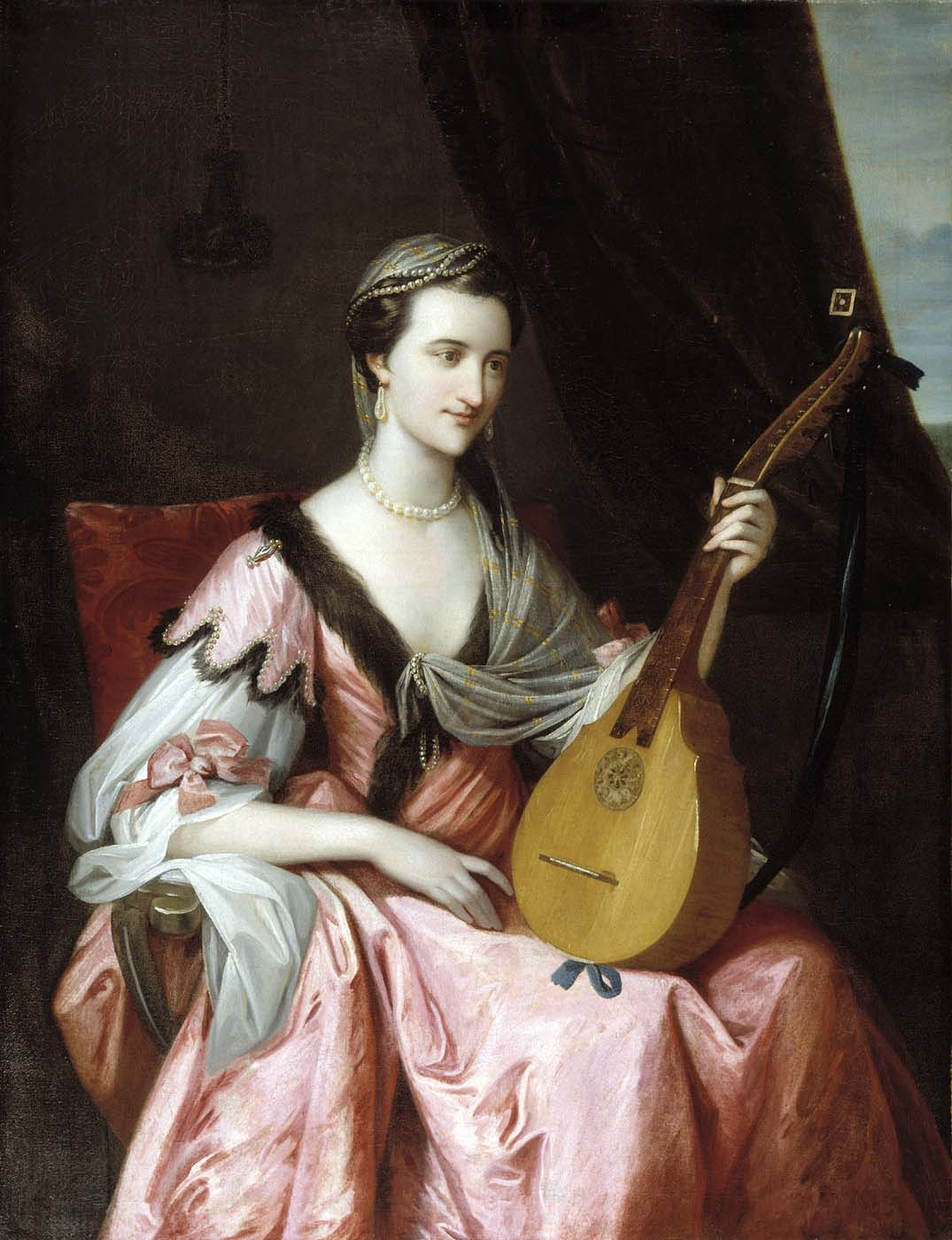
Mrs Mary (Hopkinson) Morgan, 1764

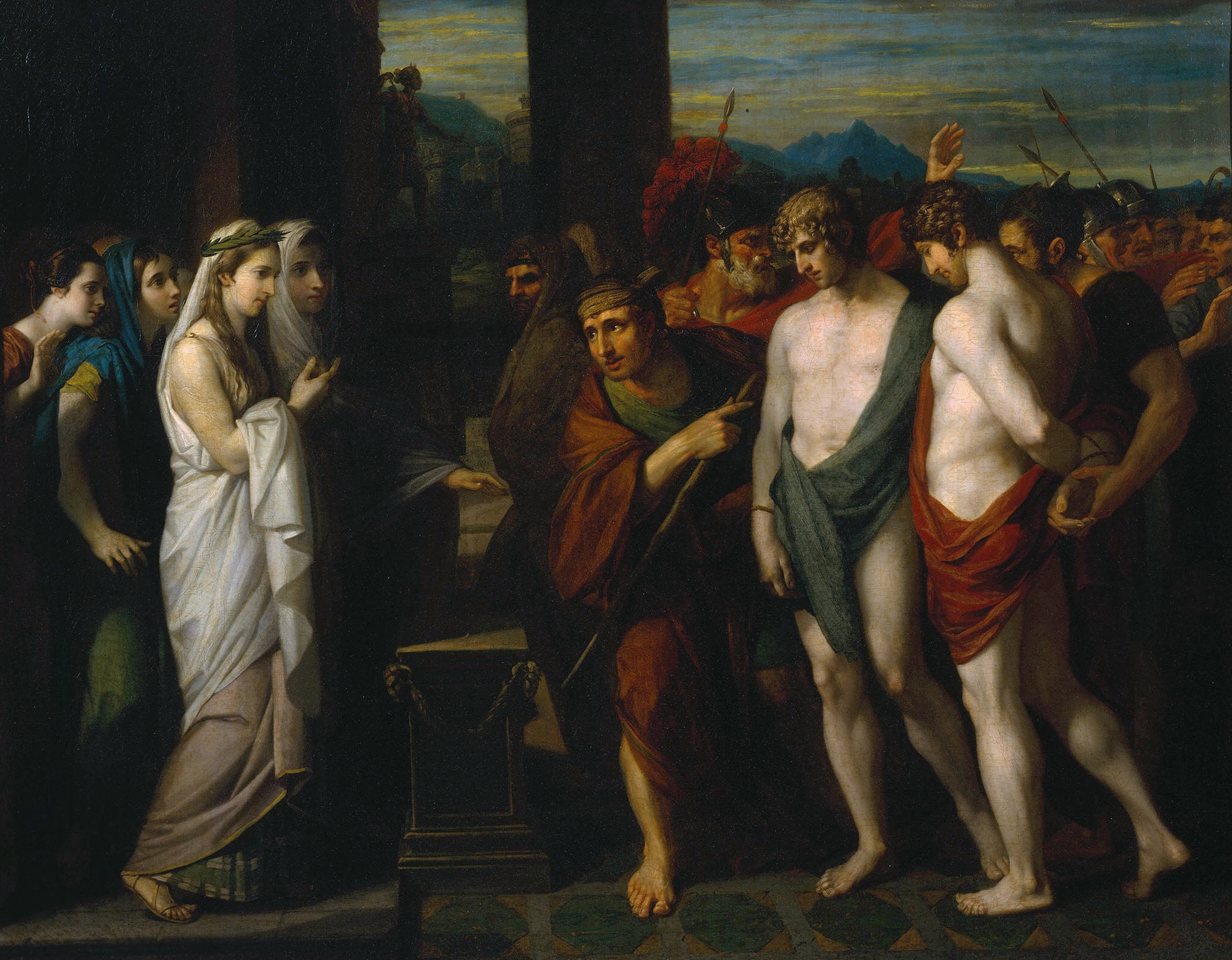
Pylades and Orestes Brought as Victims before Iphigenia, 1766

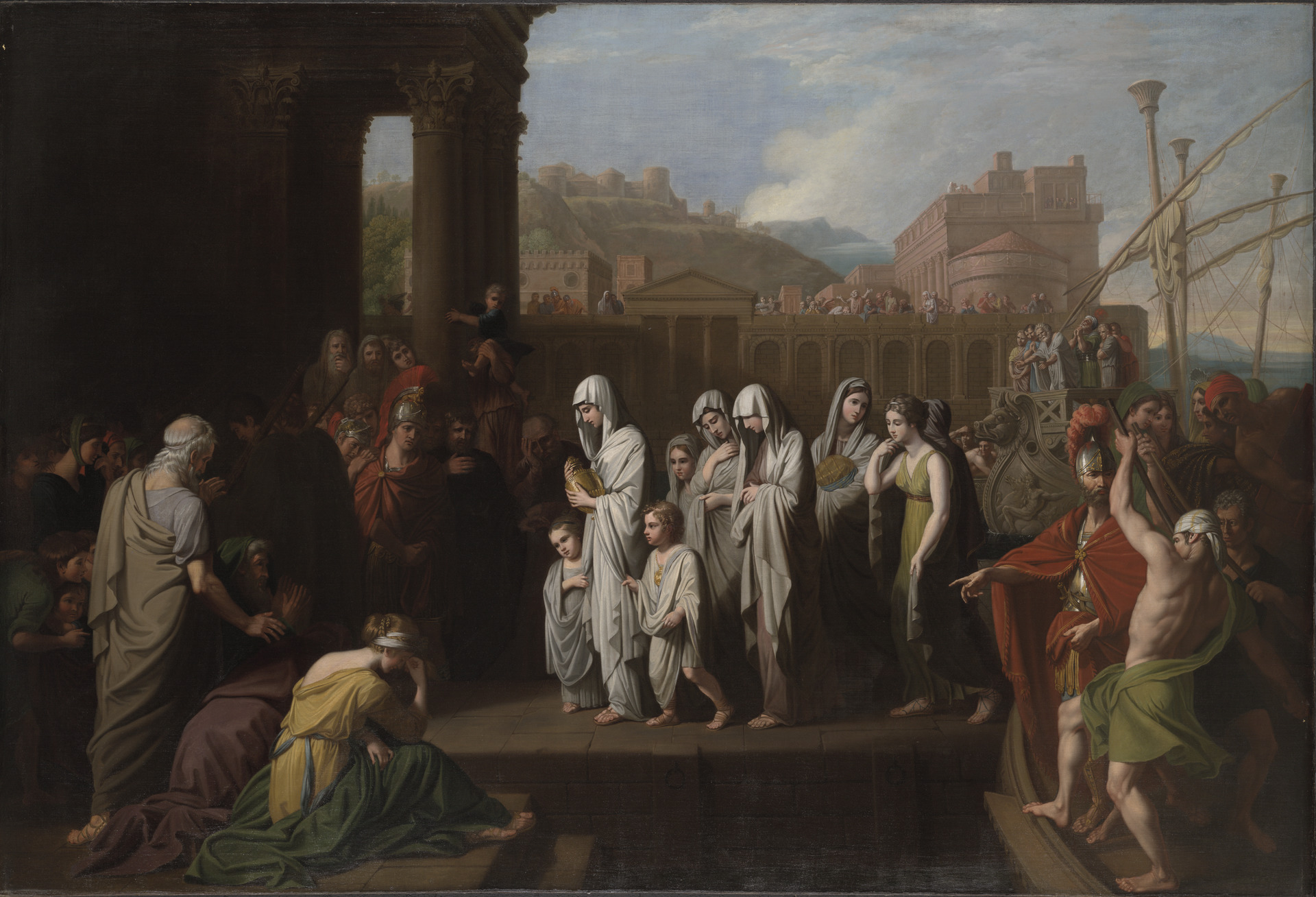
Agrippina Landing at Brundisium with the Ashes of Germanicus, 1768

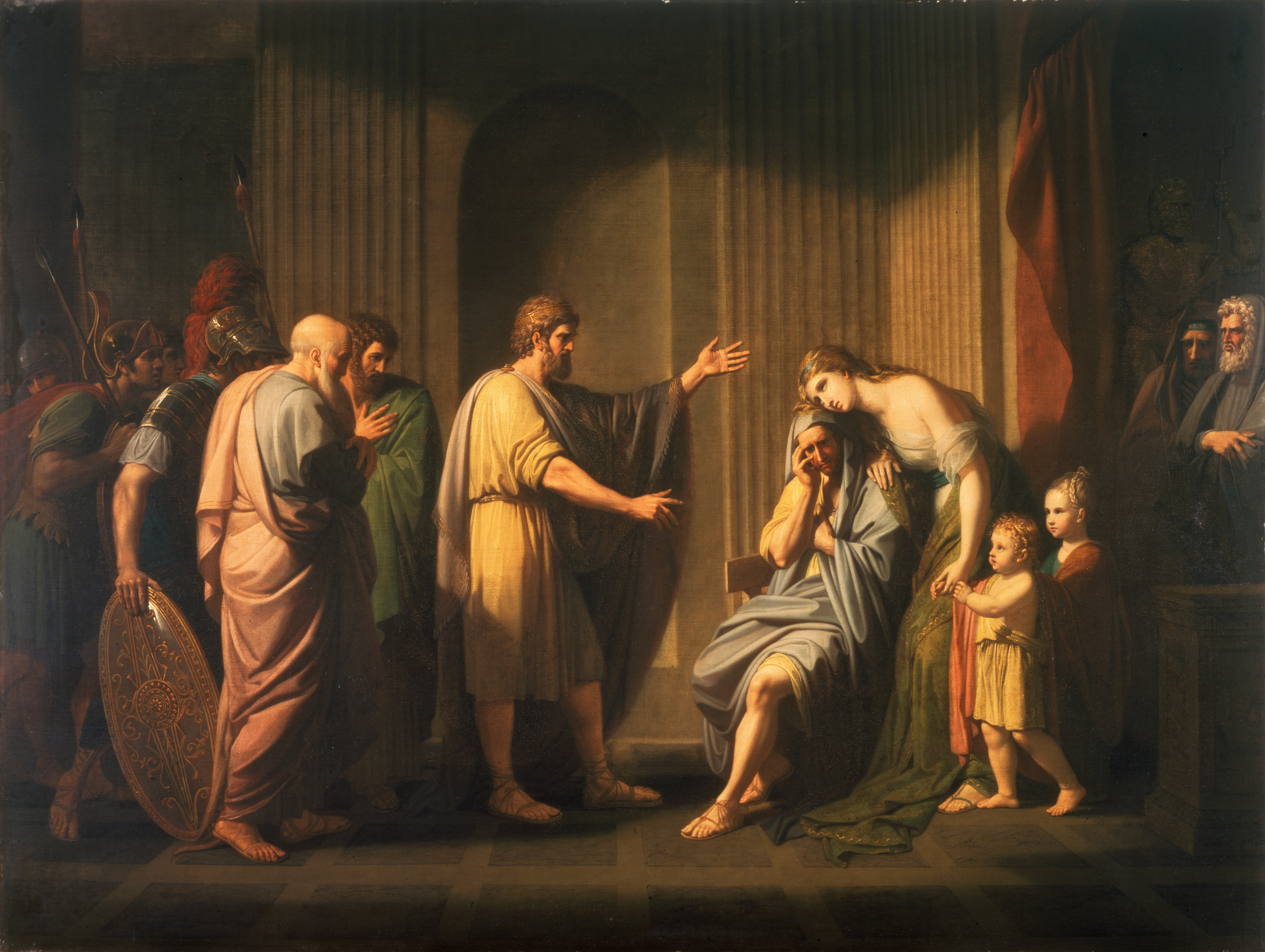
Cleombrotus Ordered into Banishment by Leonidas II, King of Sparta, 1768

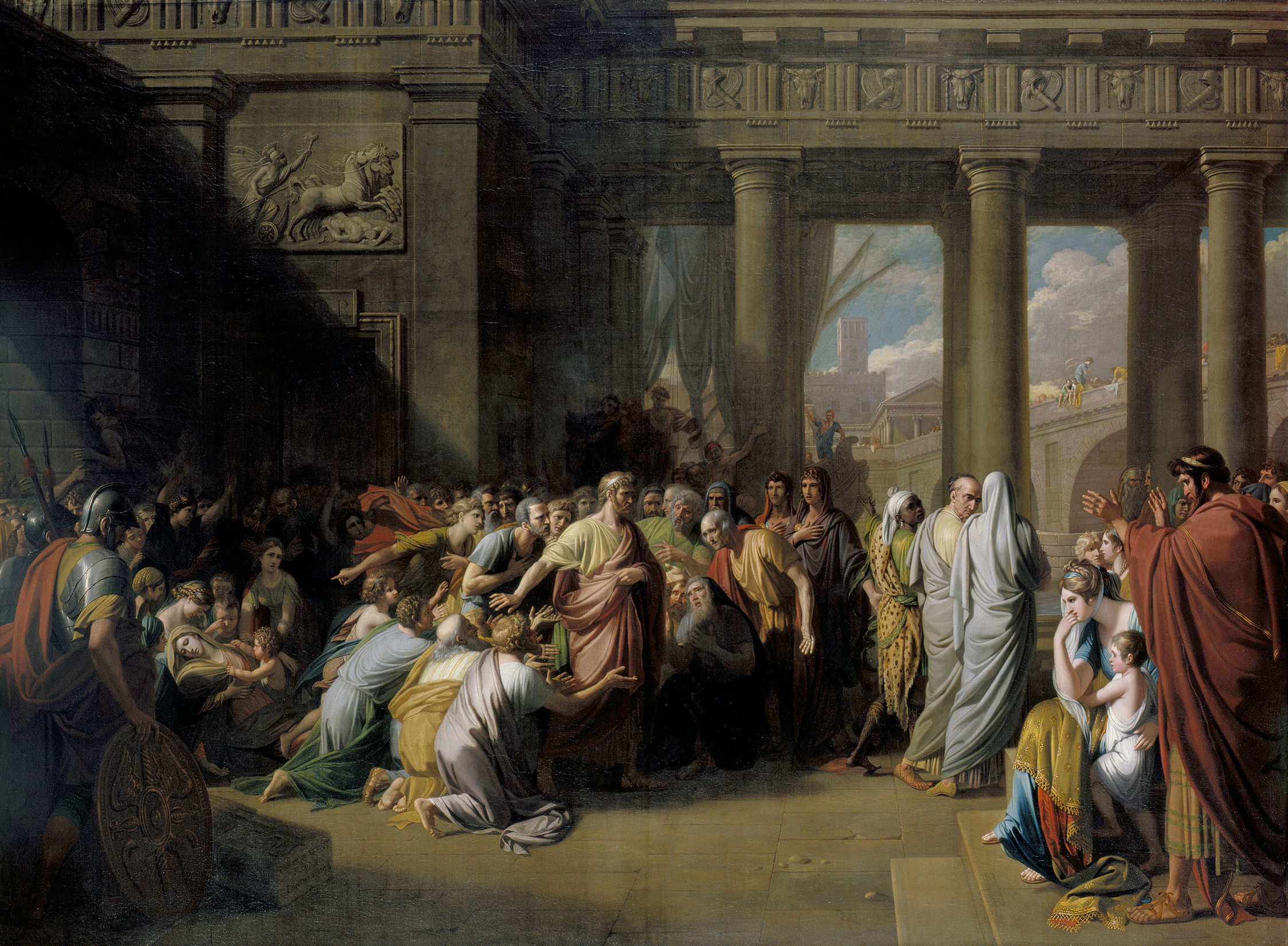
The Departure of Regulus, 1769

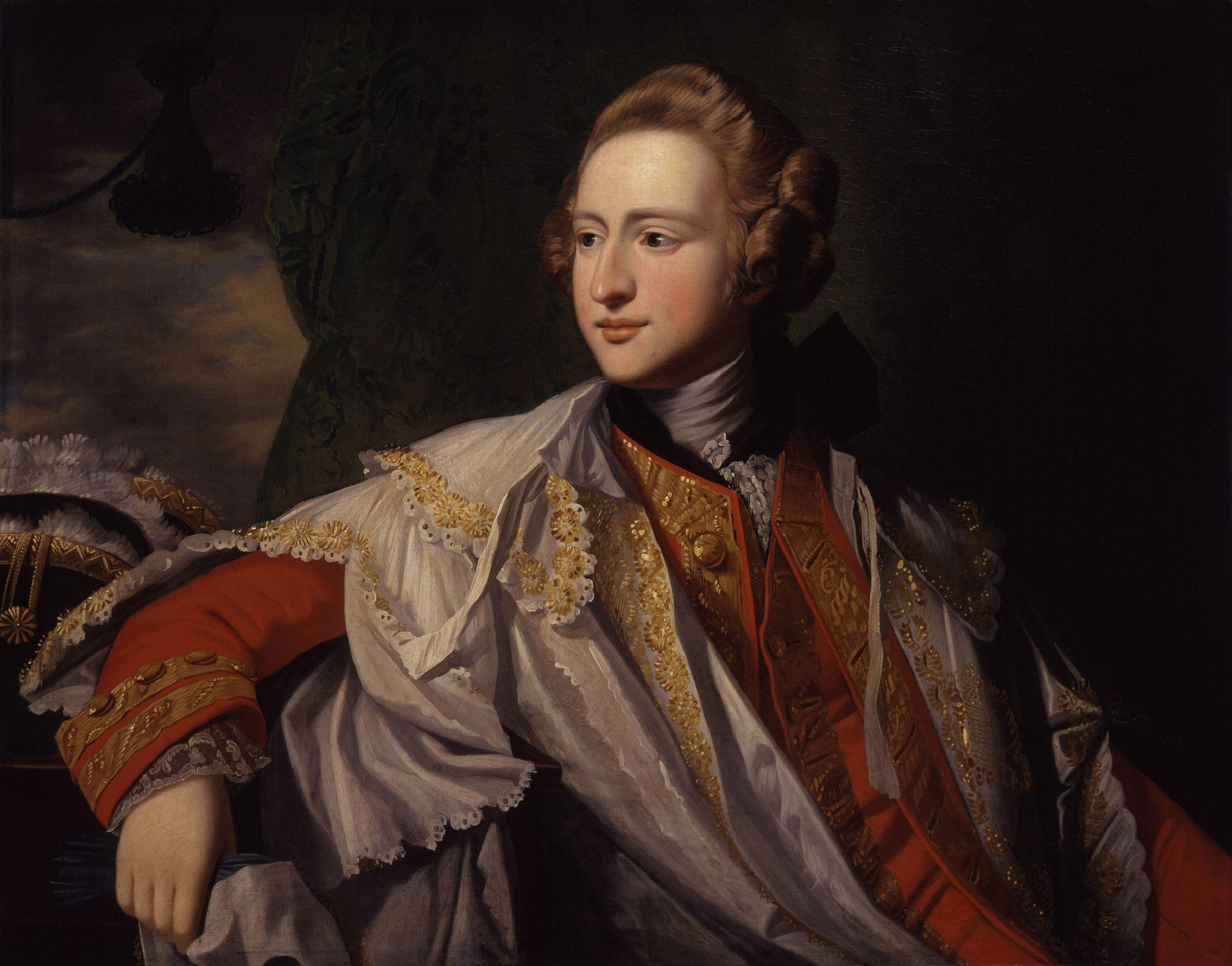
Portrait of the Duke of Leeds, 1769

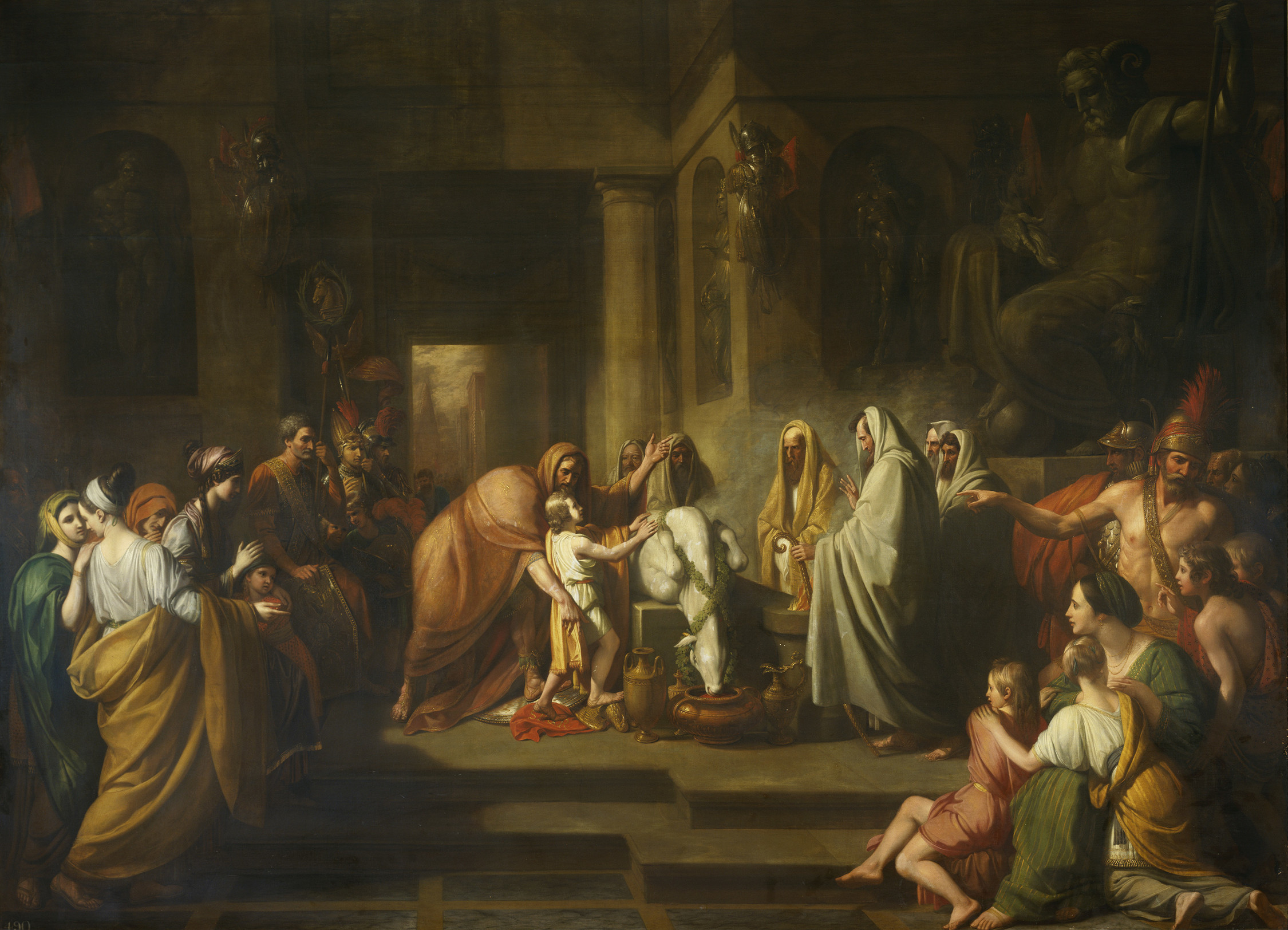
The Oath of Hannibal, 1770

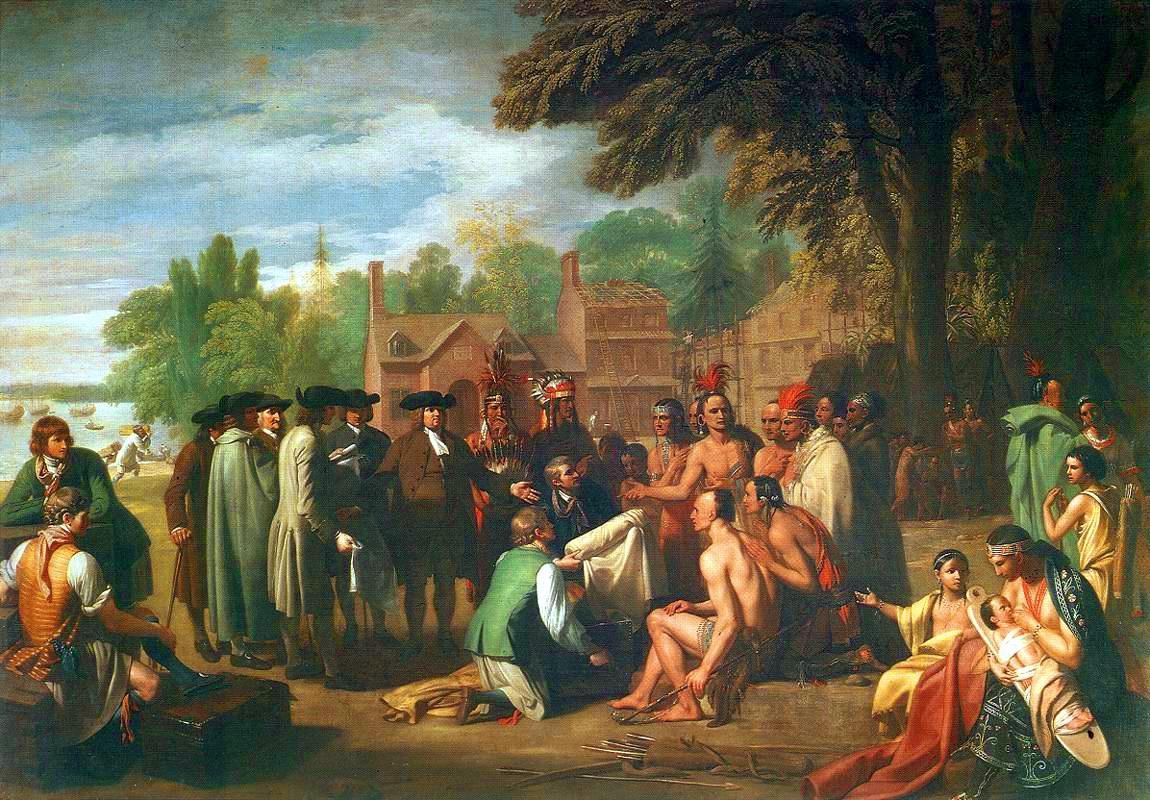
Penn's Treaty with the Indians, 1772

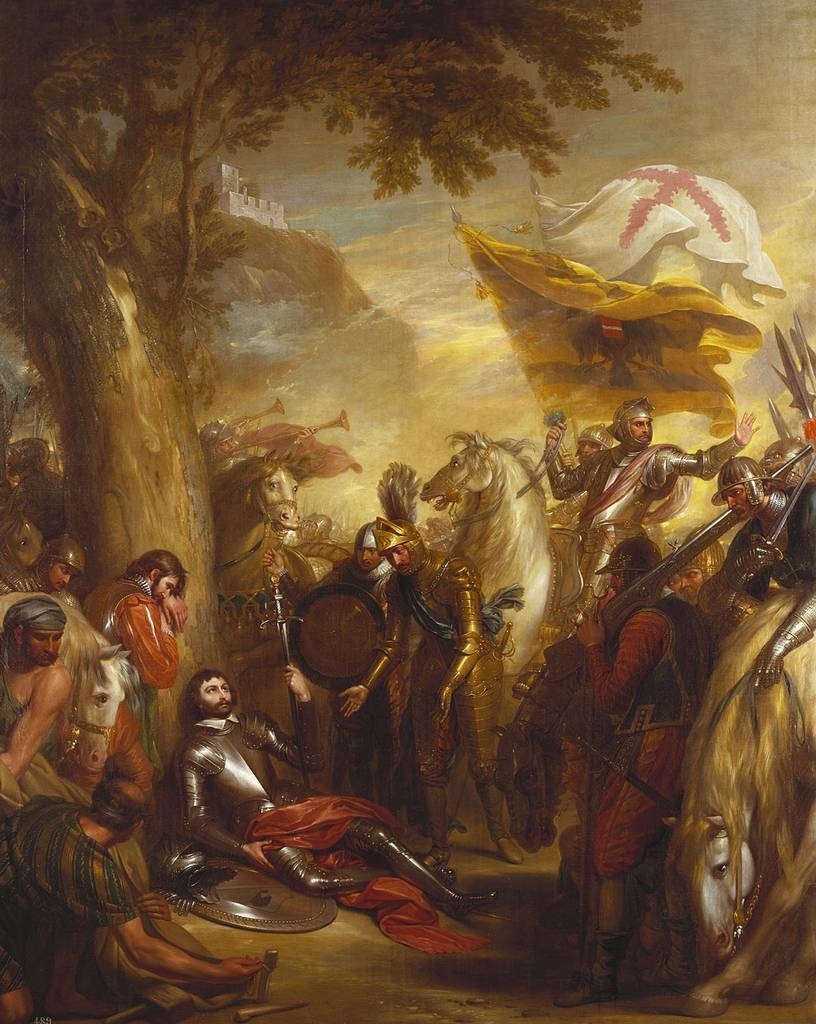
The Death of Chevalier Bayard, 1772

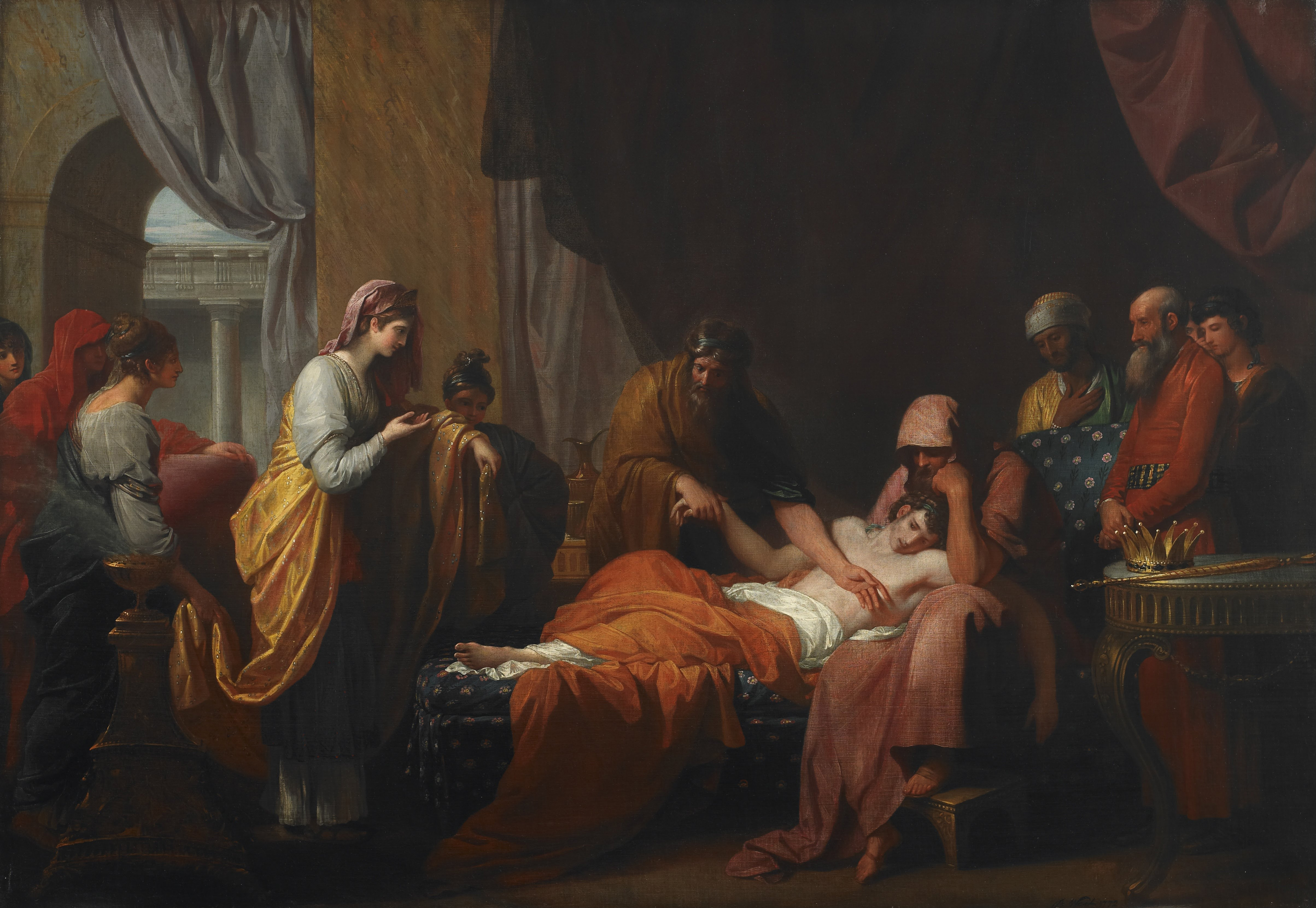
Erasistratus the Physician Discovers the Love of Antiochus for Stratonice, 1772

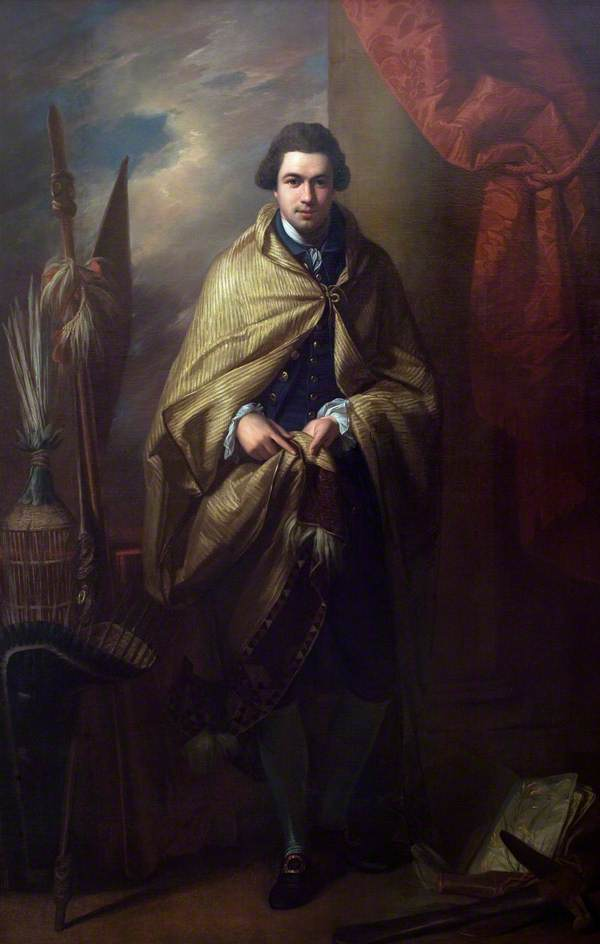
Portrait of Joseph Banks, 1772

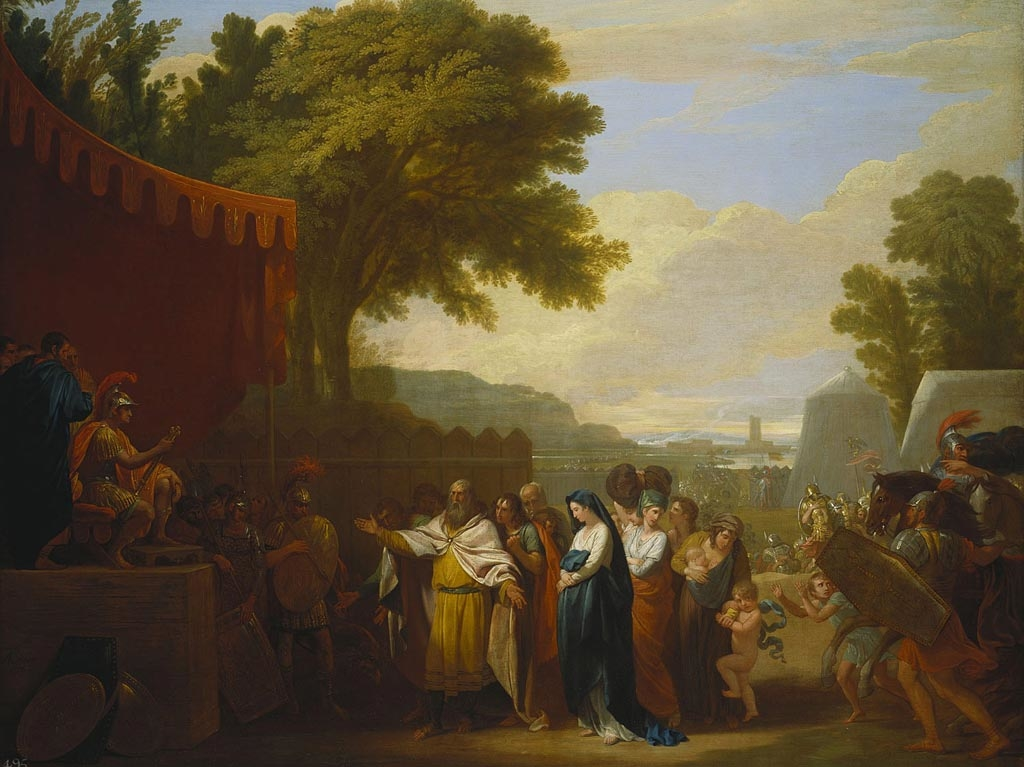
The Wife of Arminius Brought Captive to Germanicus, 1773

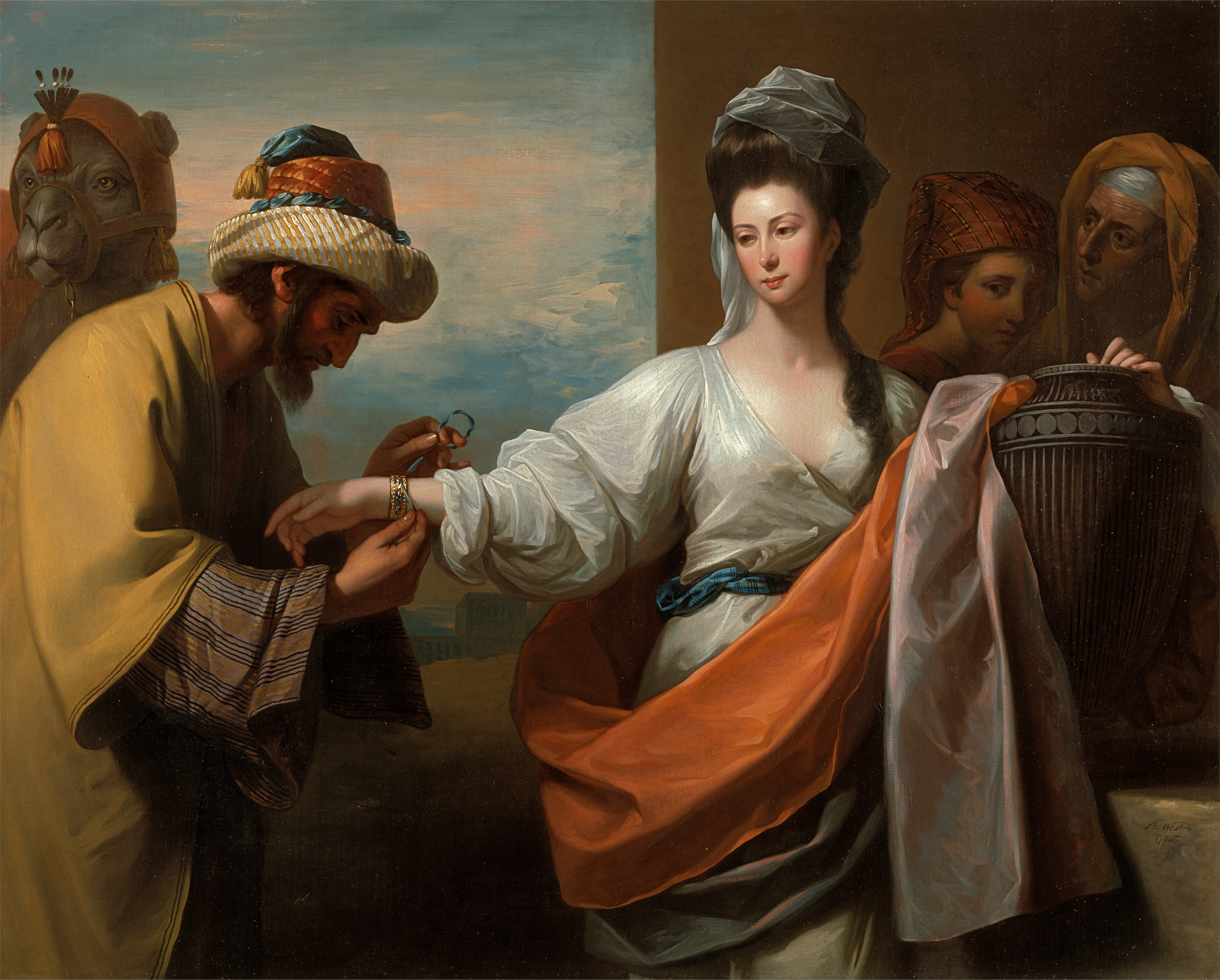
Isaac's Servant Tying the Bracelet on Rebecca's Arm, 1775

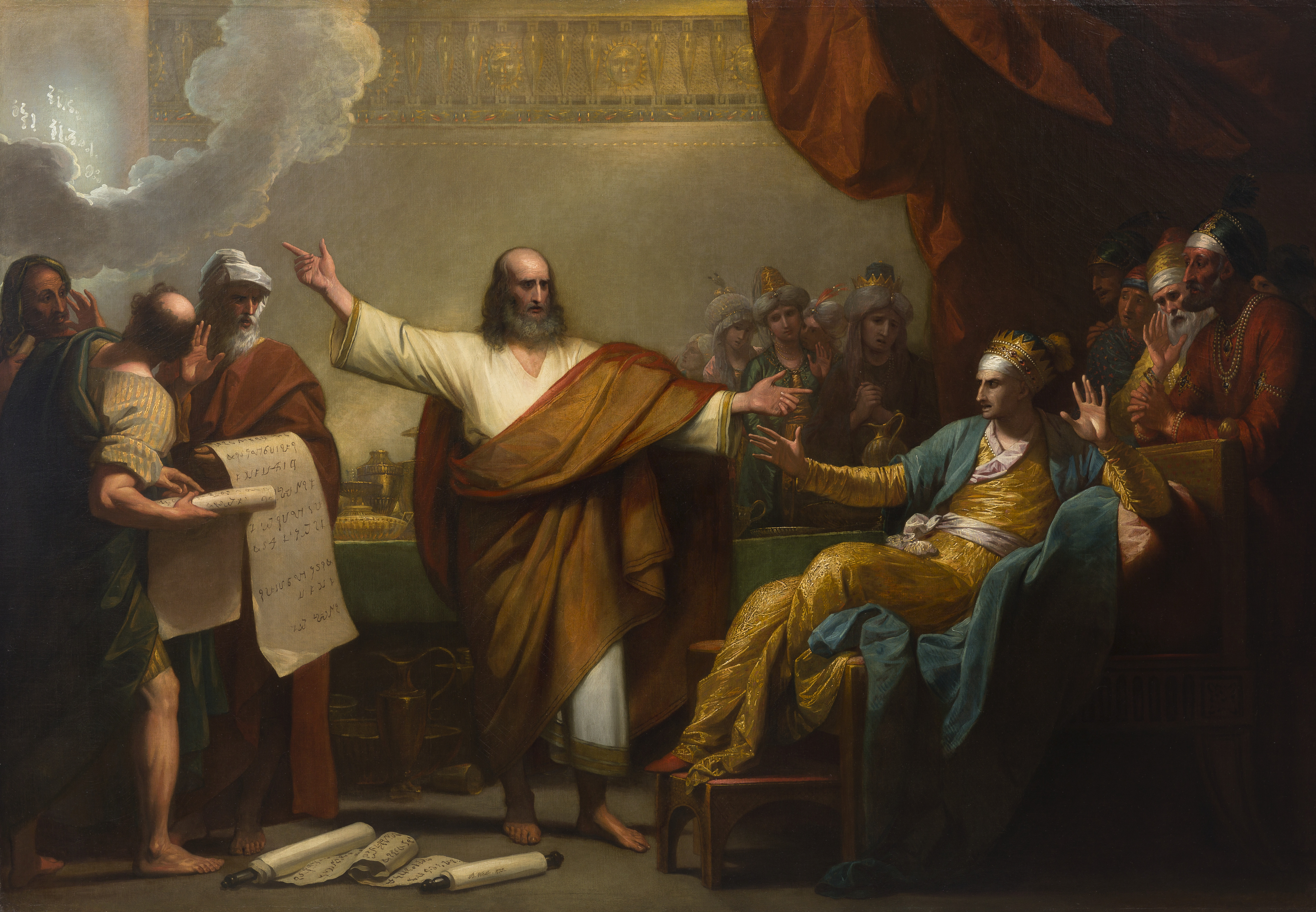
Daniel Interpreting to Belshazzar the Writing on the Wall, 1775

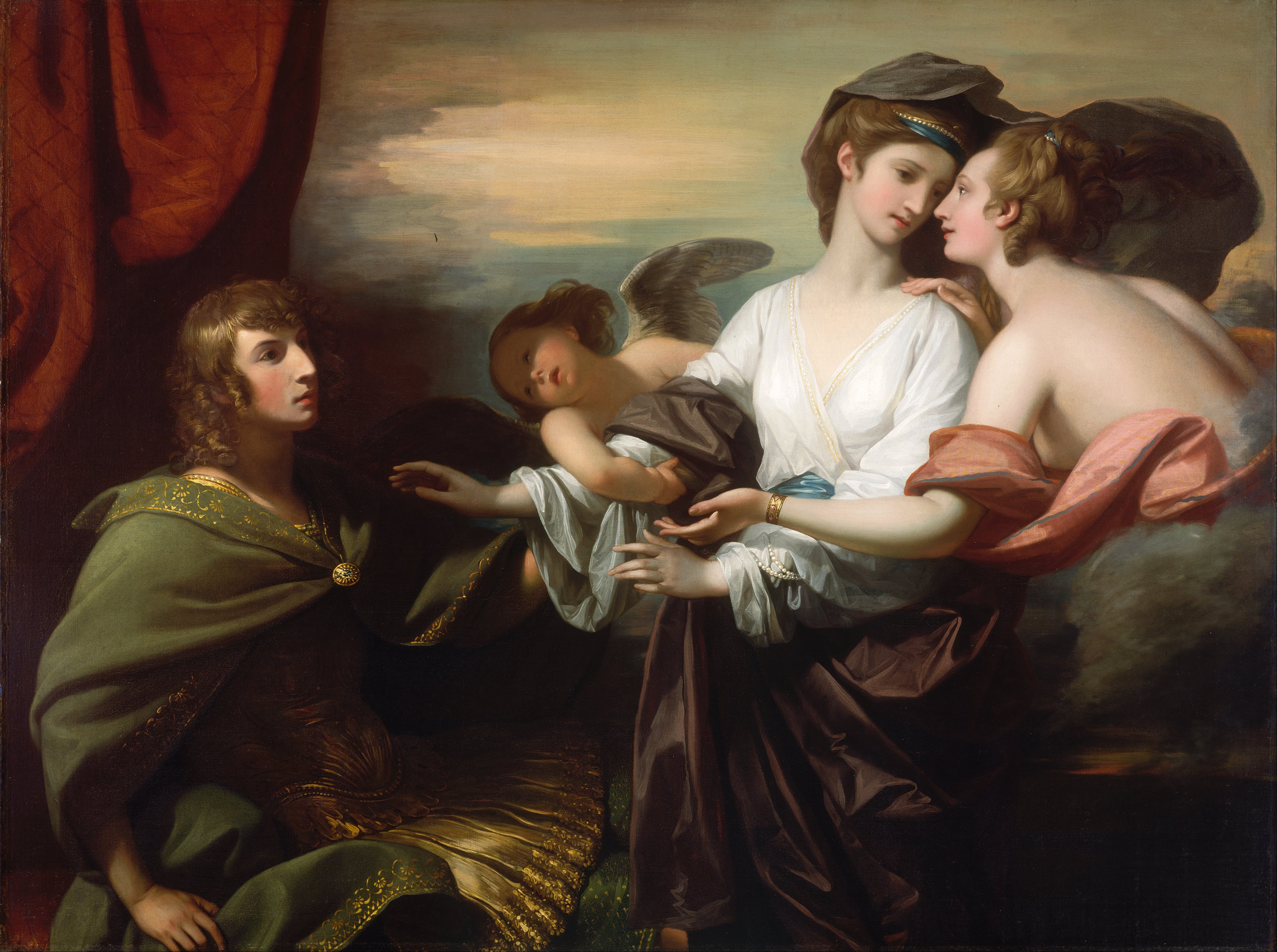
Helen Brought to Paris, 1776

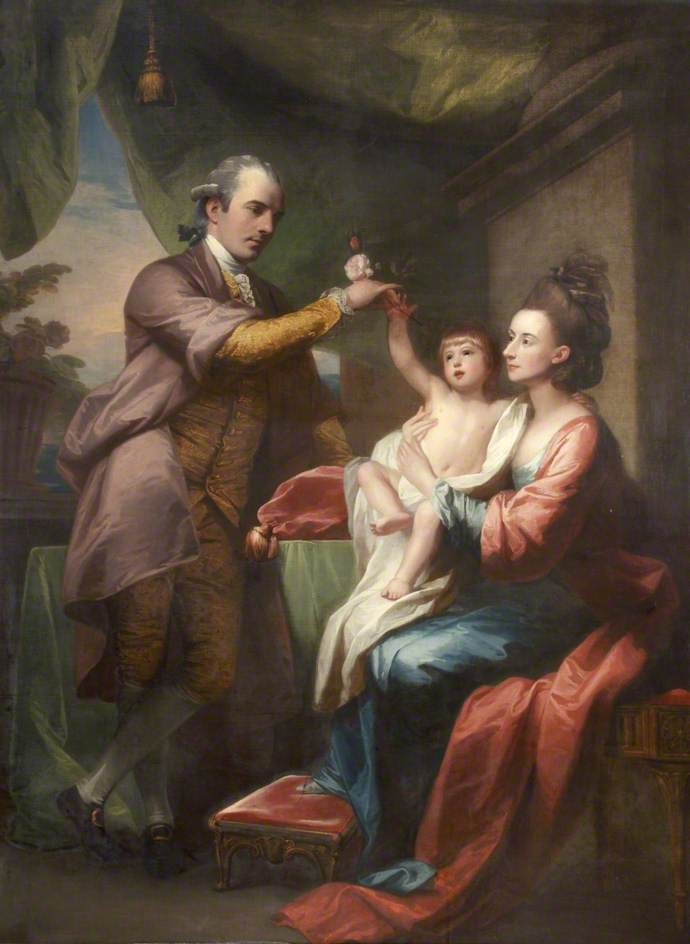
The Sheridan Family, 1776

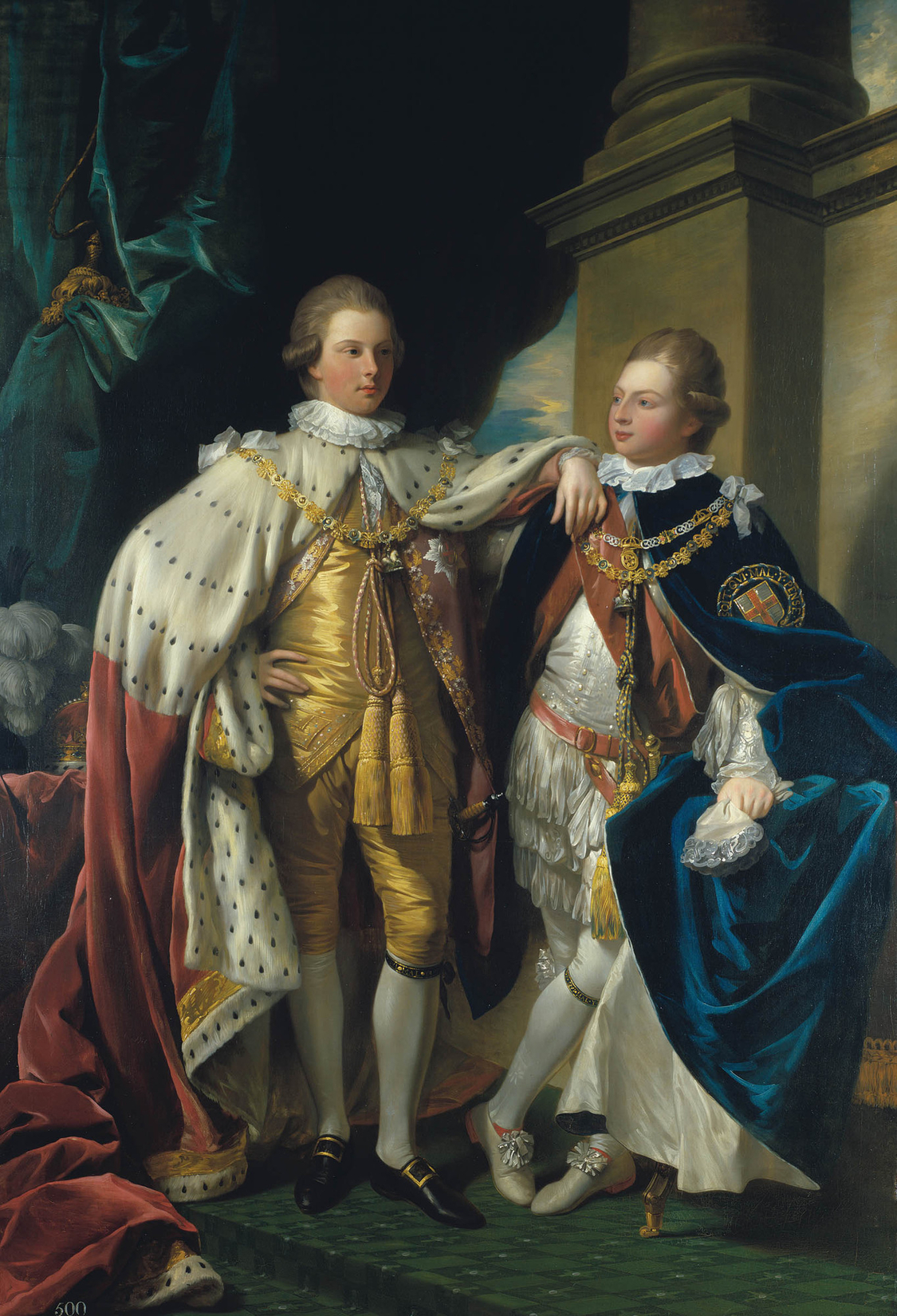
The Prince of Wales and Duke of York, 1777

Portrait of Sir Thomas Beauchamp-Proctor, 1777

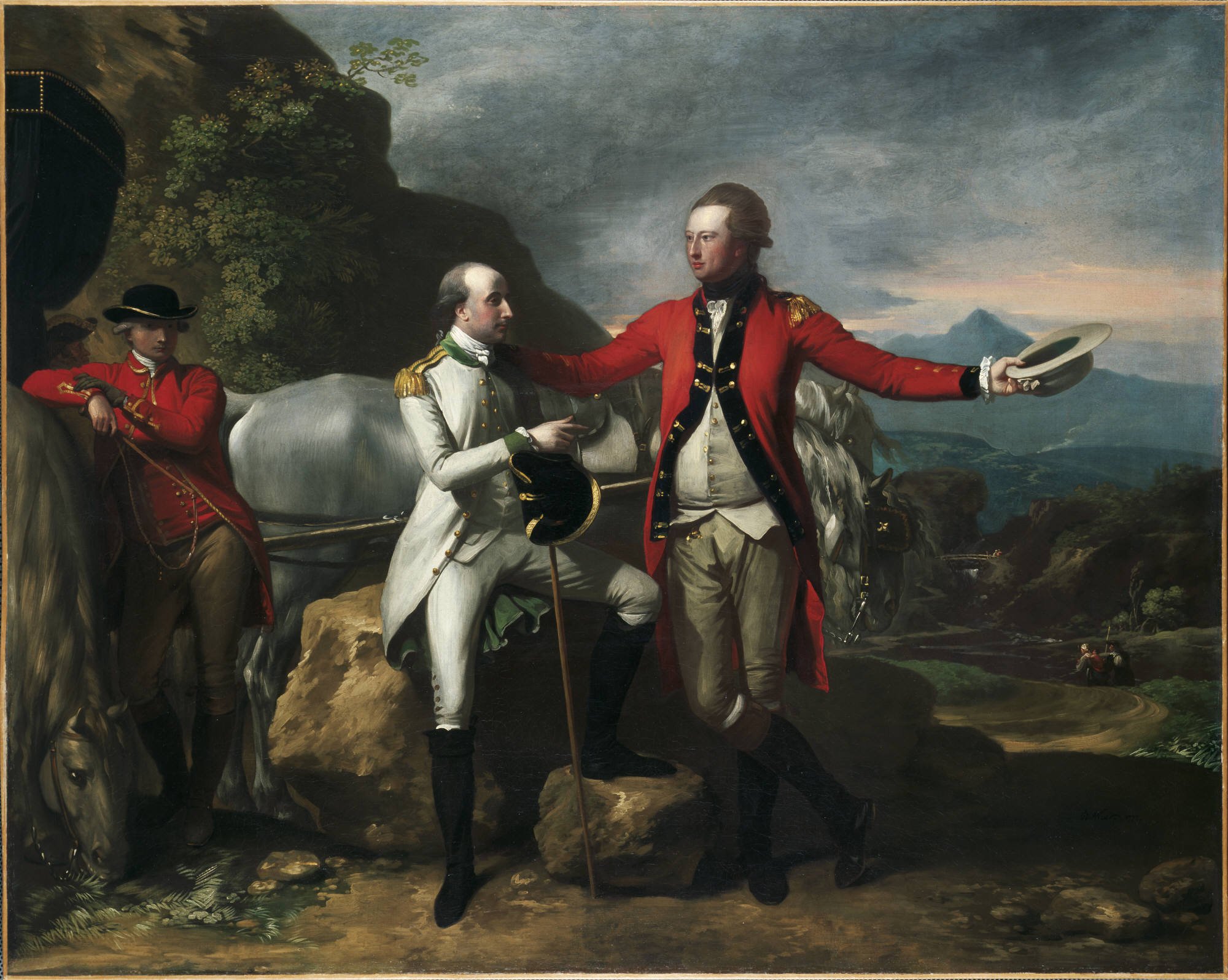
Two Officers and a Groom in a Landscape, 1777, Princeton University Art Museum

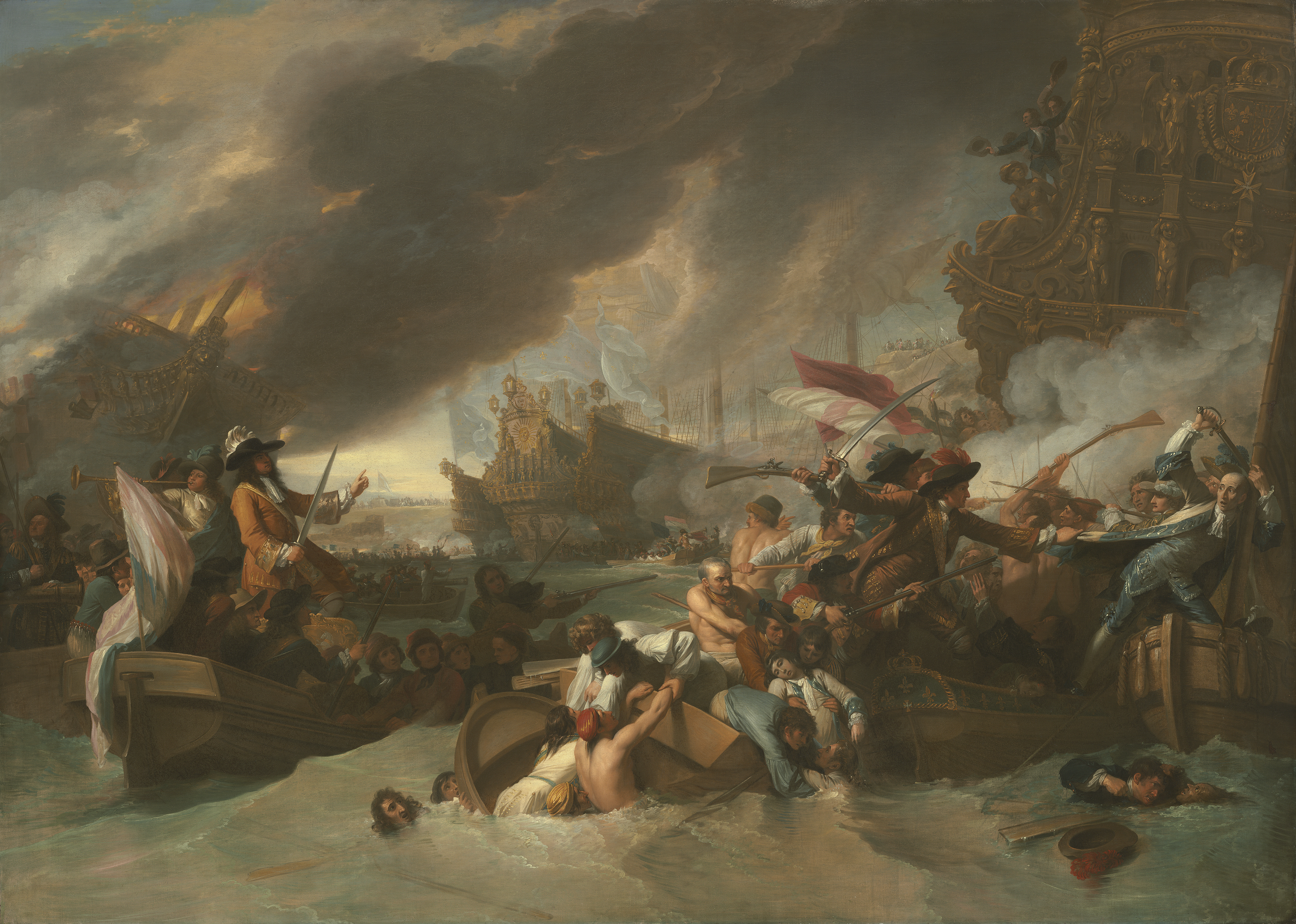
The Battle of La Hogue, c. 1778, National Gallery of Art

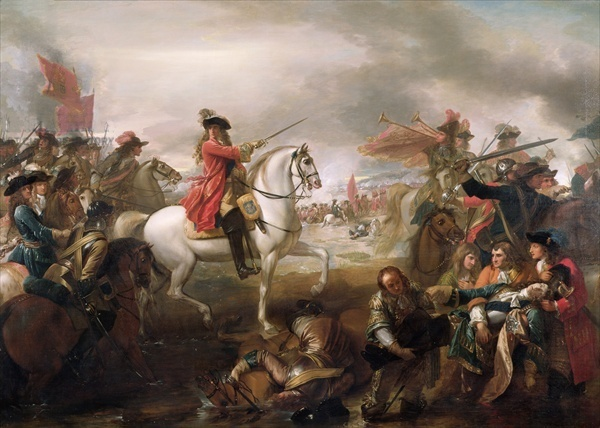
The Battle of the Boyne, 1778

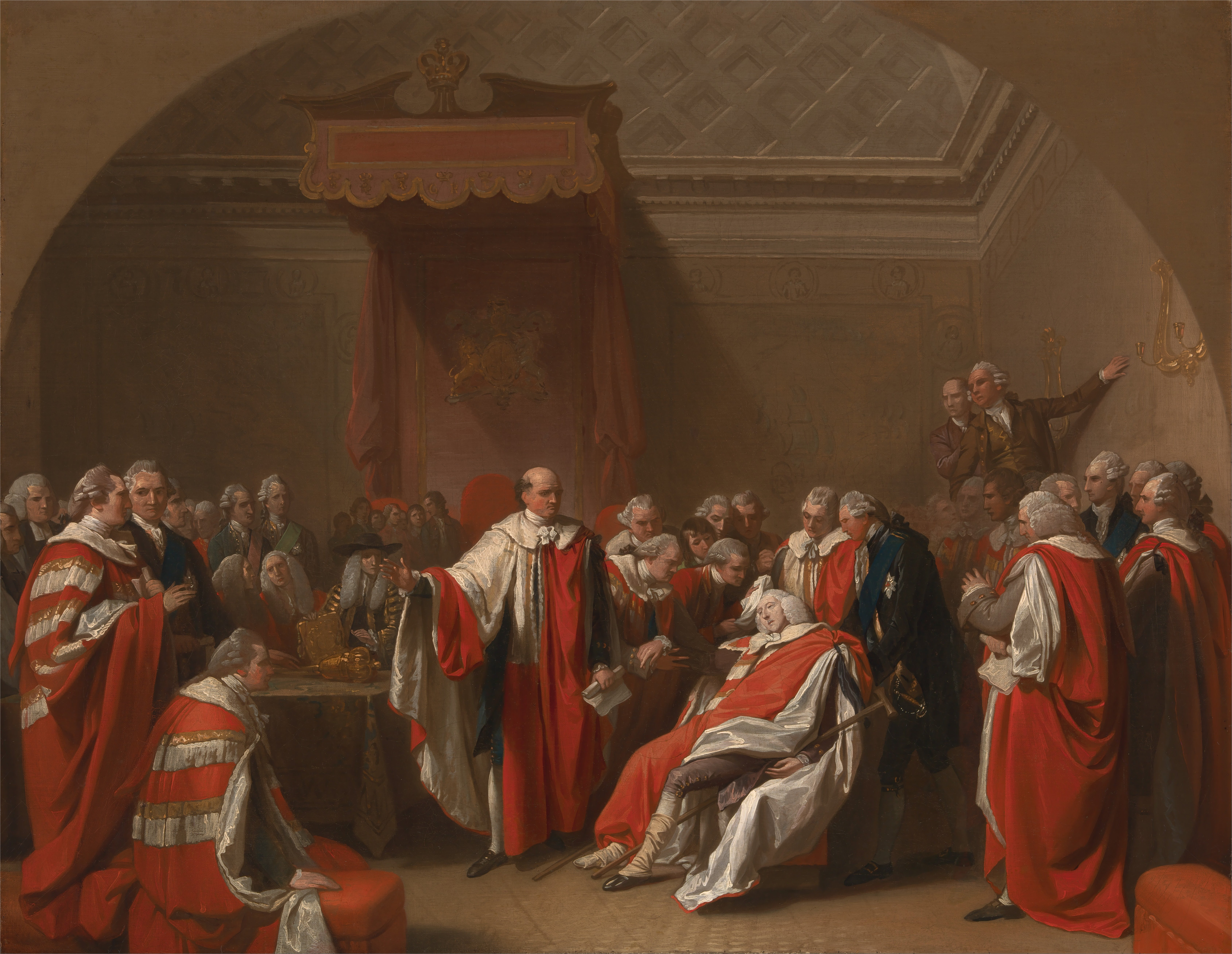
The Death of Chatham, 1778

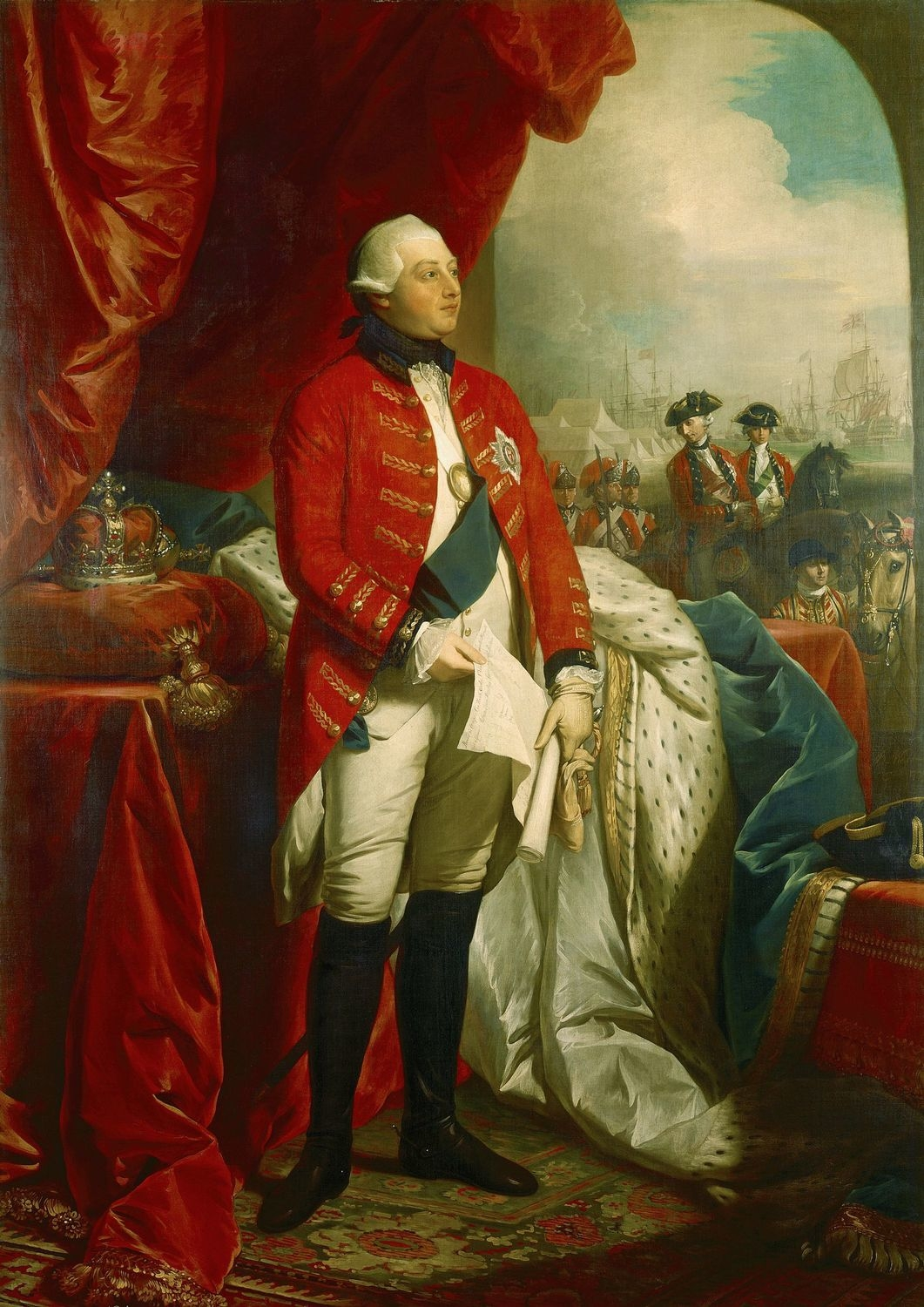
Portrait of George III, 1779

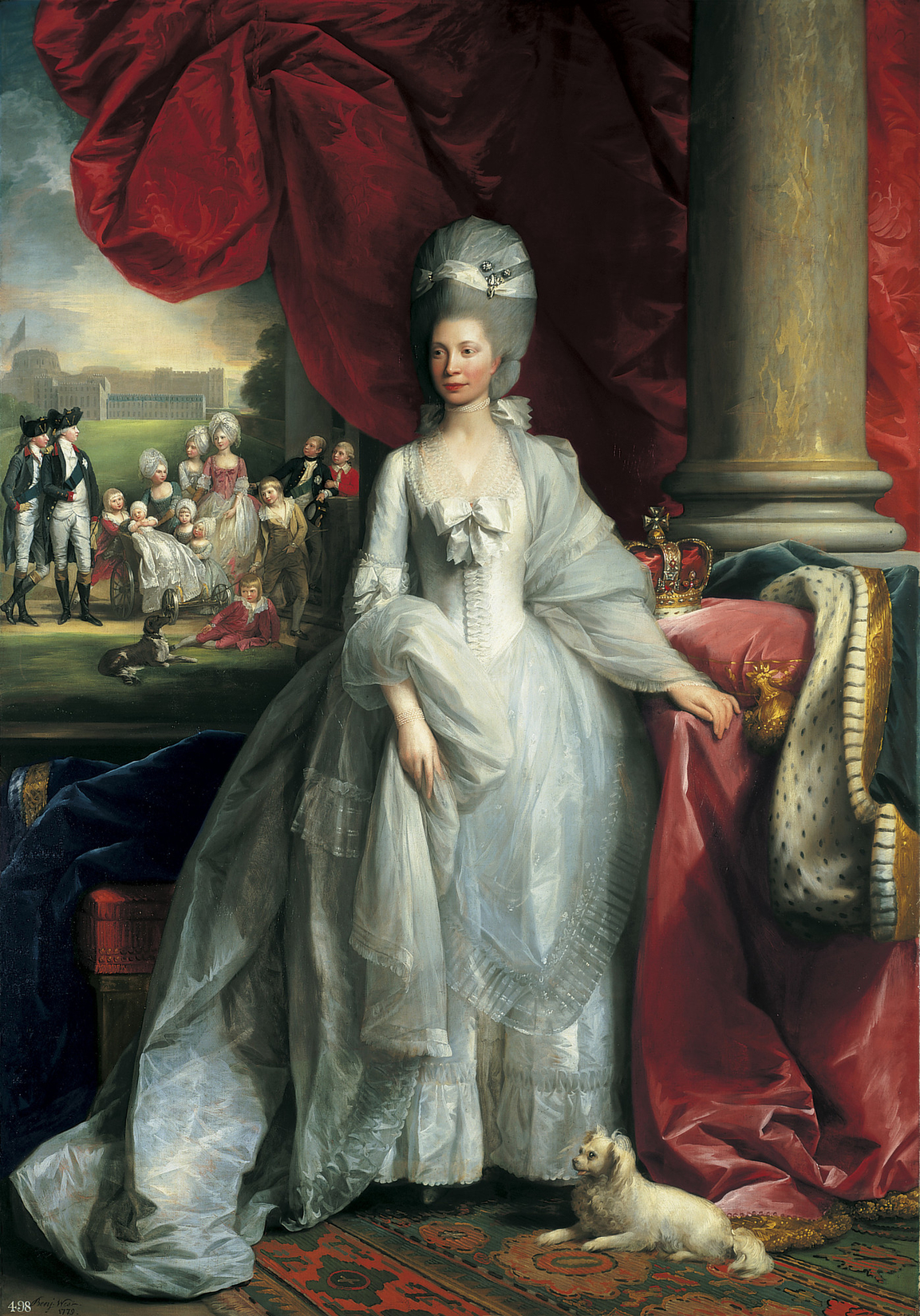
Portrait of Queen Charlotte, 1779

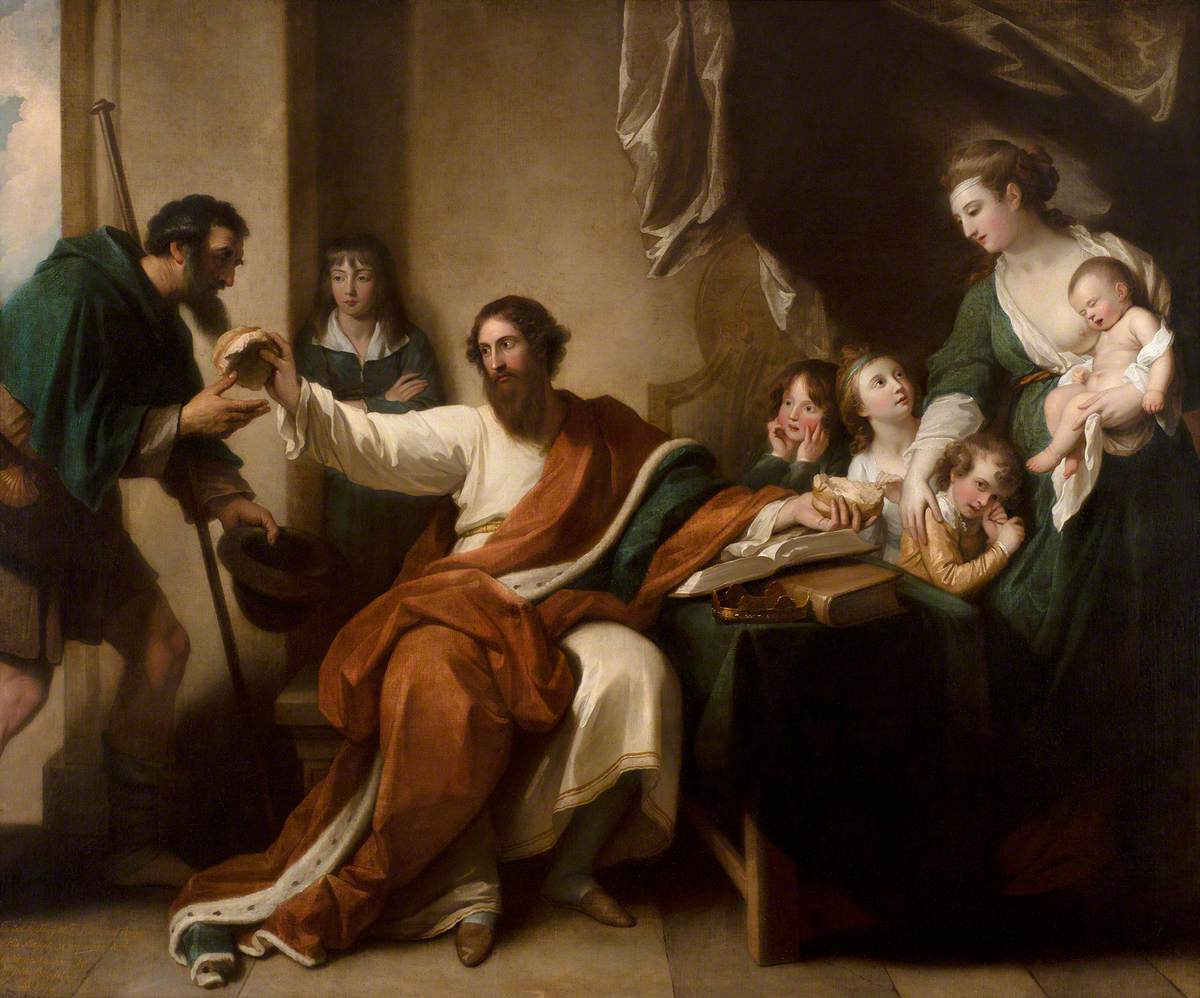
Alfred the Great Dividing His Loaf with a Pilgrim, 1779

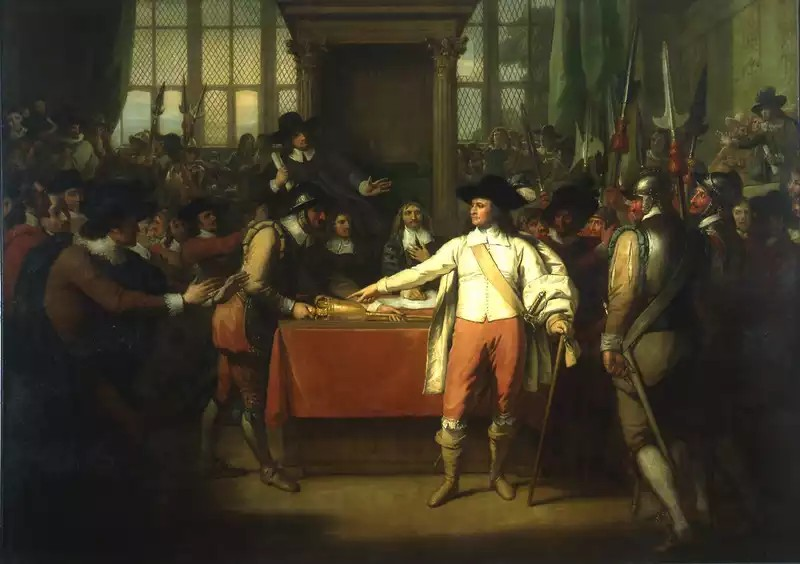
Oliver Cromwell Dissolving the Long Parliament, 1782

General Monck Receiving Charles II on the Beaches of Dover, 1782

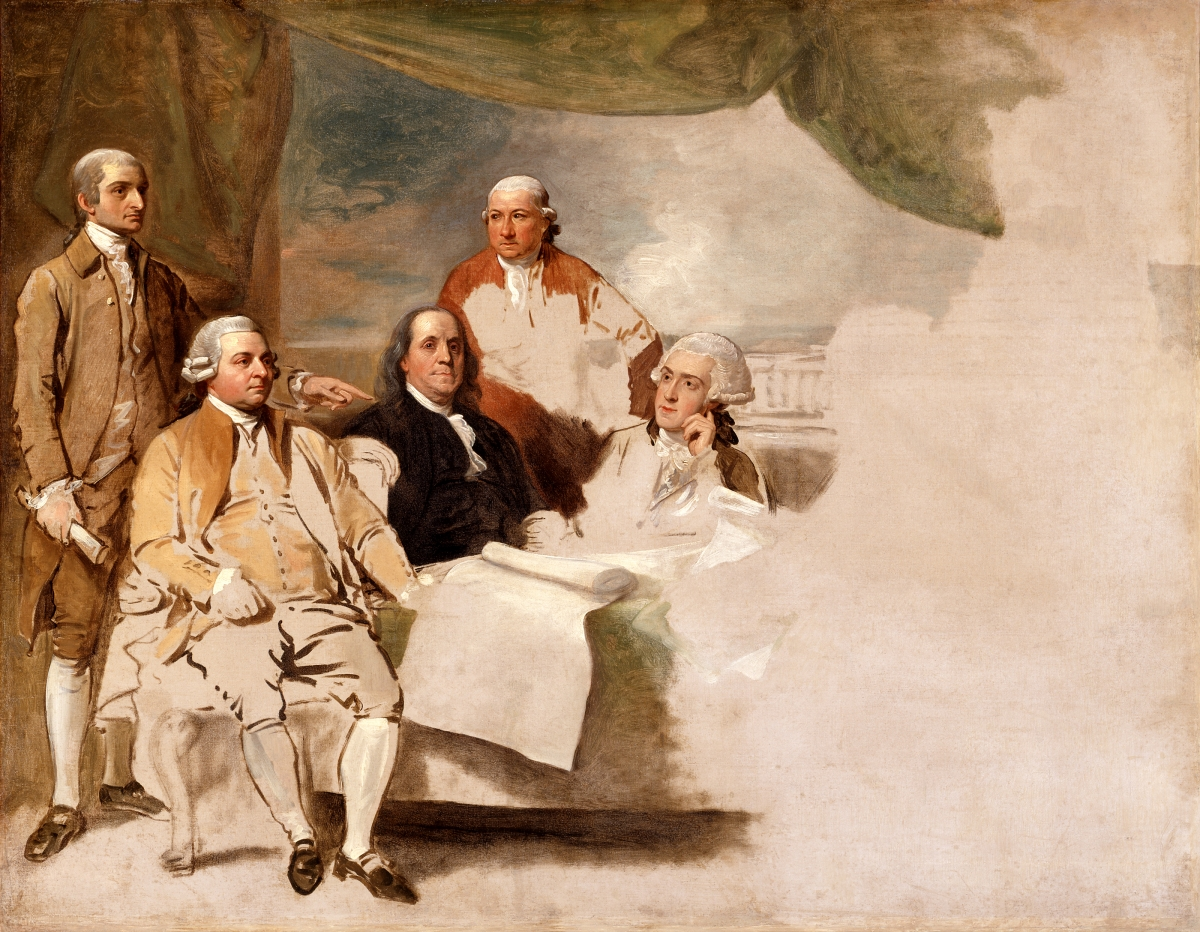
Treaty of Paris depicts the American delegation at the 1783 Treaty of Paris. The British delegation refused to pose, and the painting was never completed, c. 1783–84.

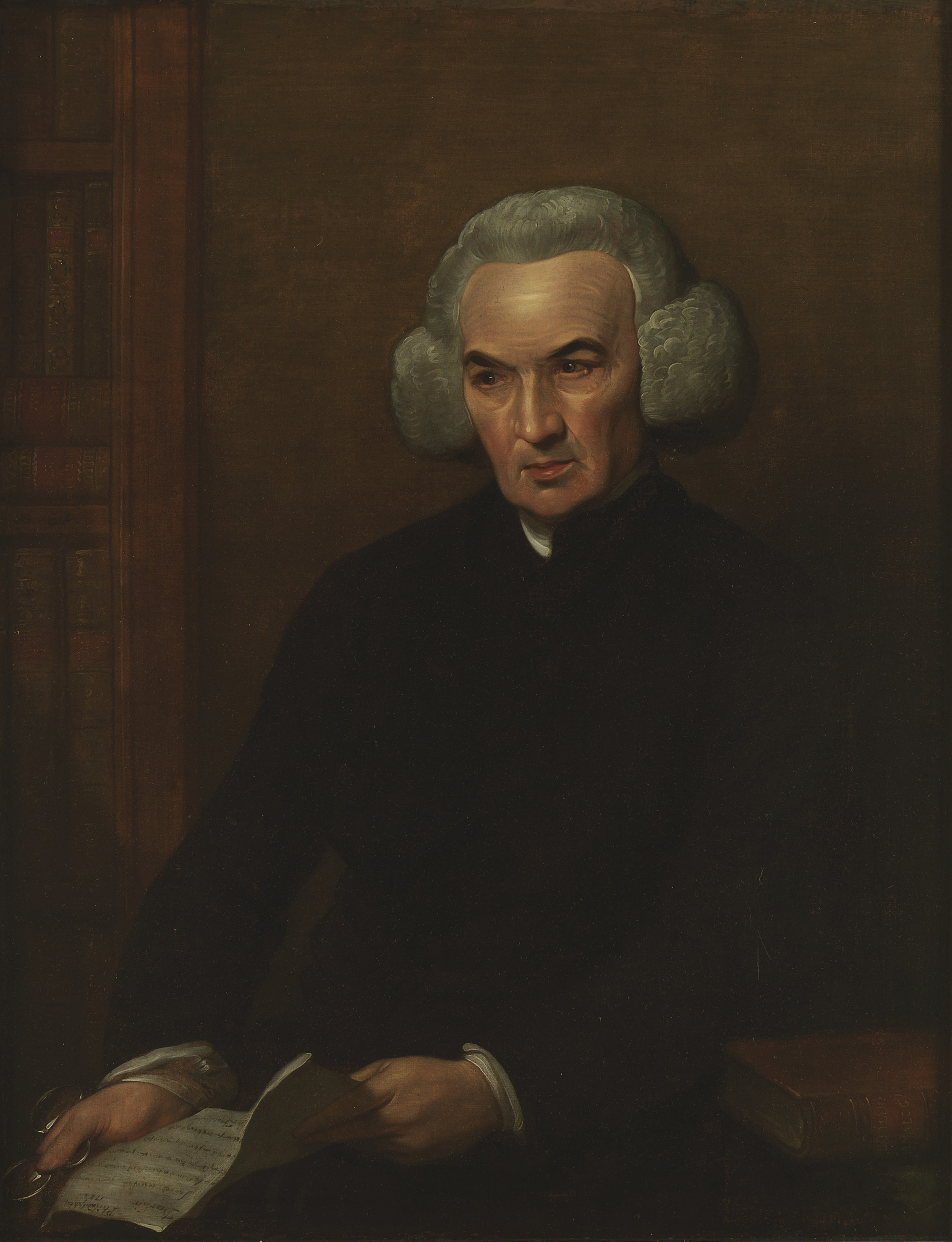
Welsh moral philosopher Richard Price, 1784

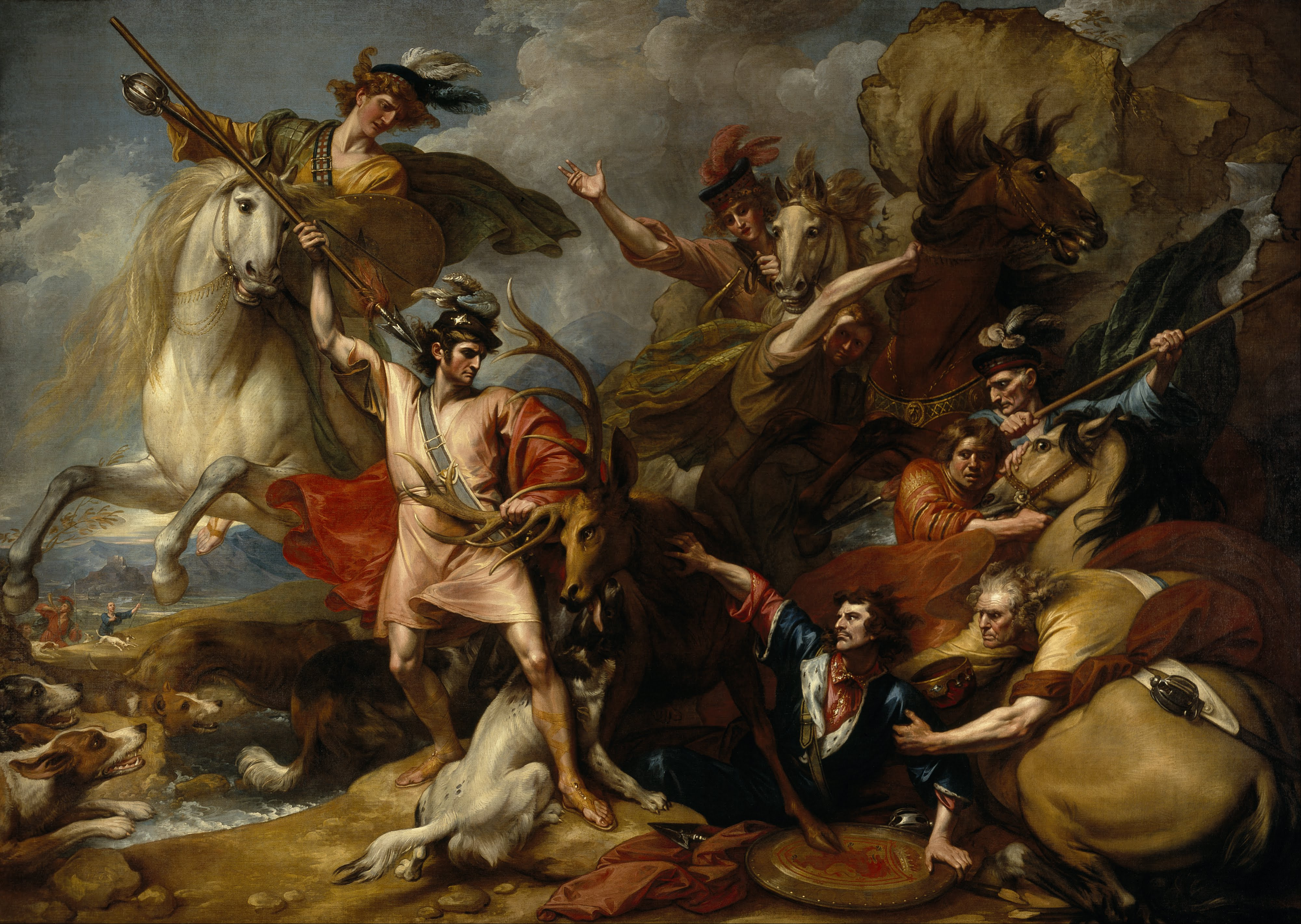
Alexander III of Scotland Rescued from the Fury of a Stag by the Intrepidity of Colin Fitzgerald, 1786

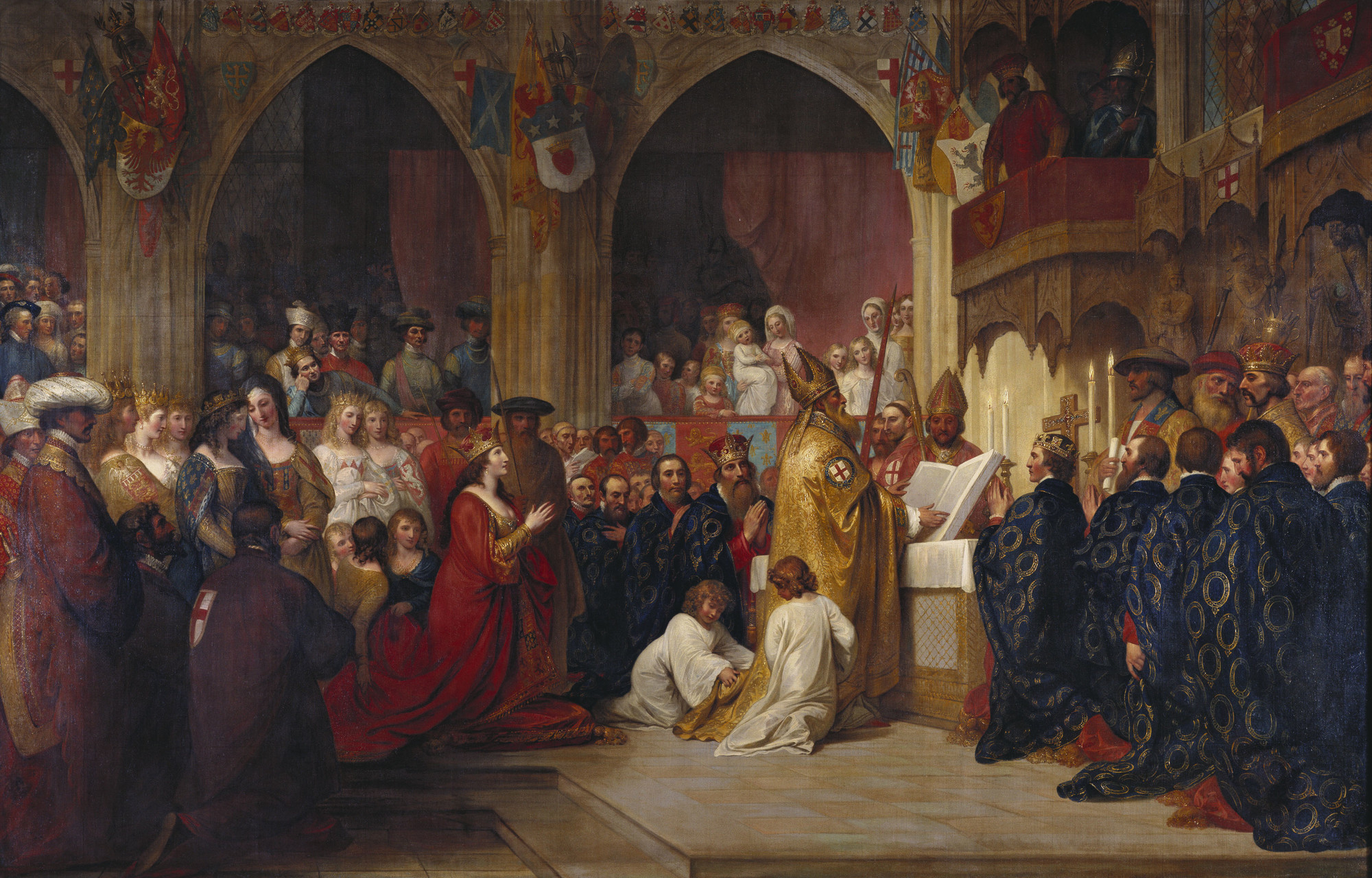
The Institution of the Order of the Garter, 1787

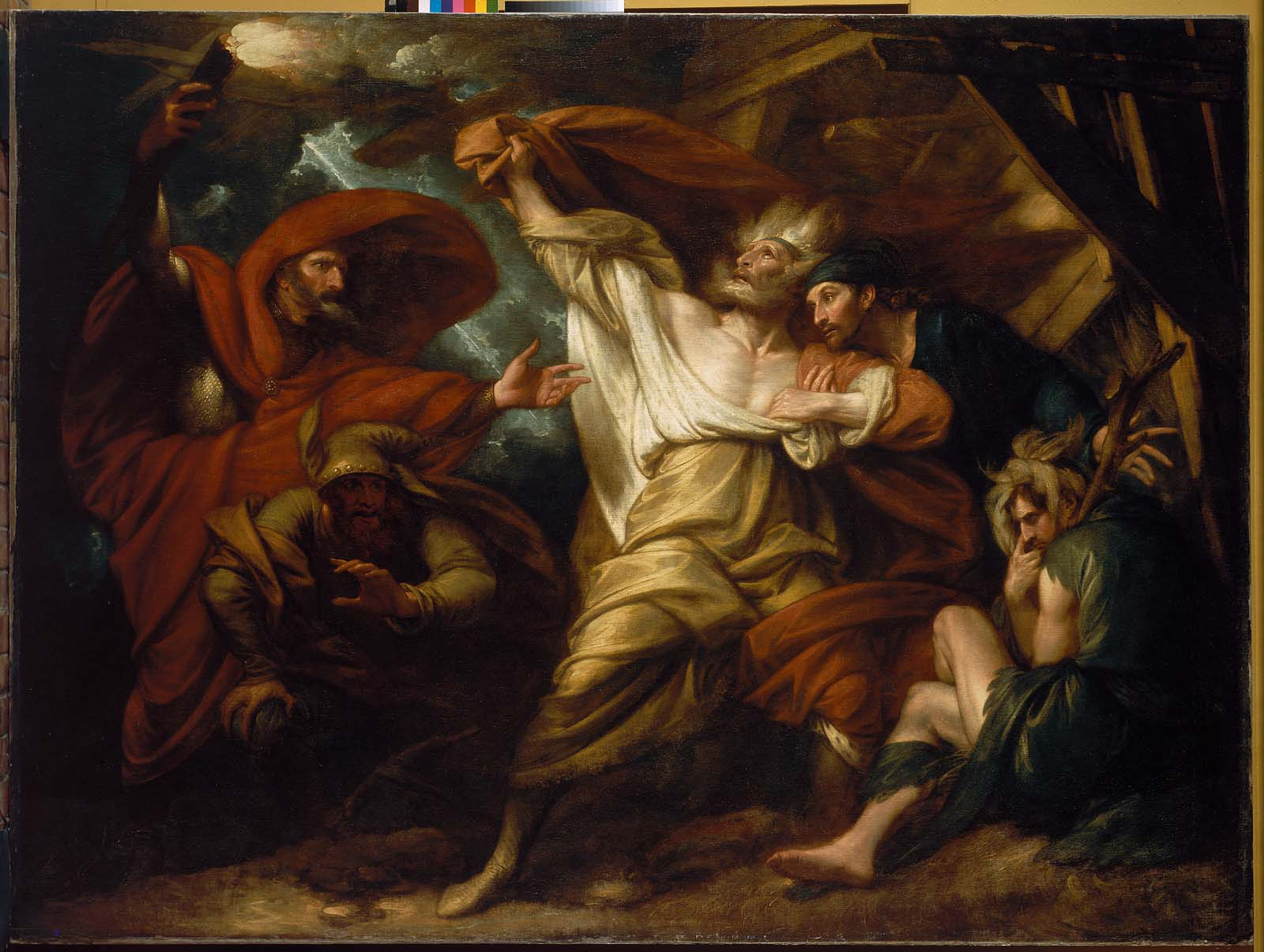
King Lear in the Storm, 1788

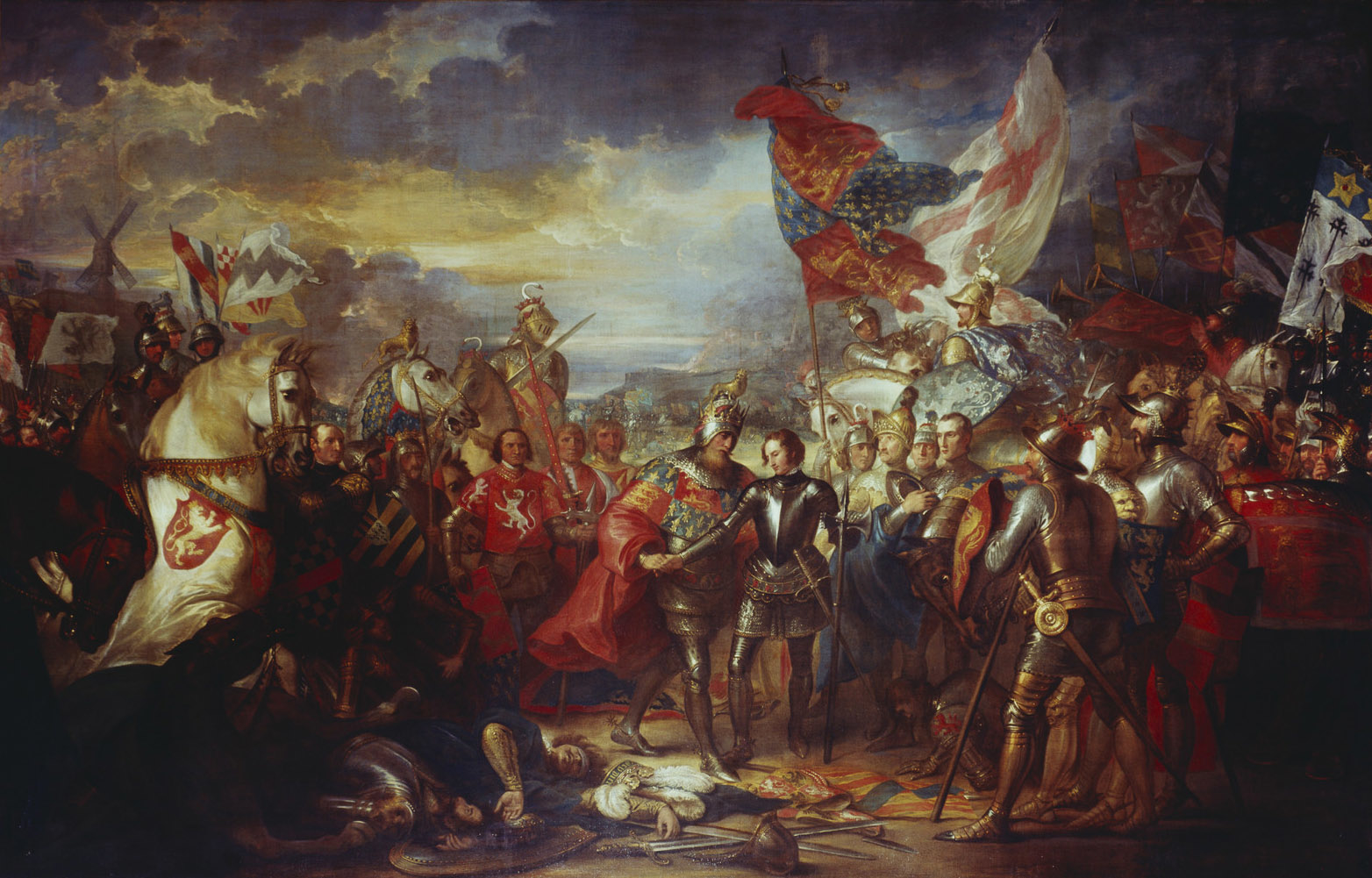
Edward III with the Black Prince after the Battle of Crécy, 1788

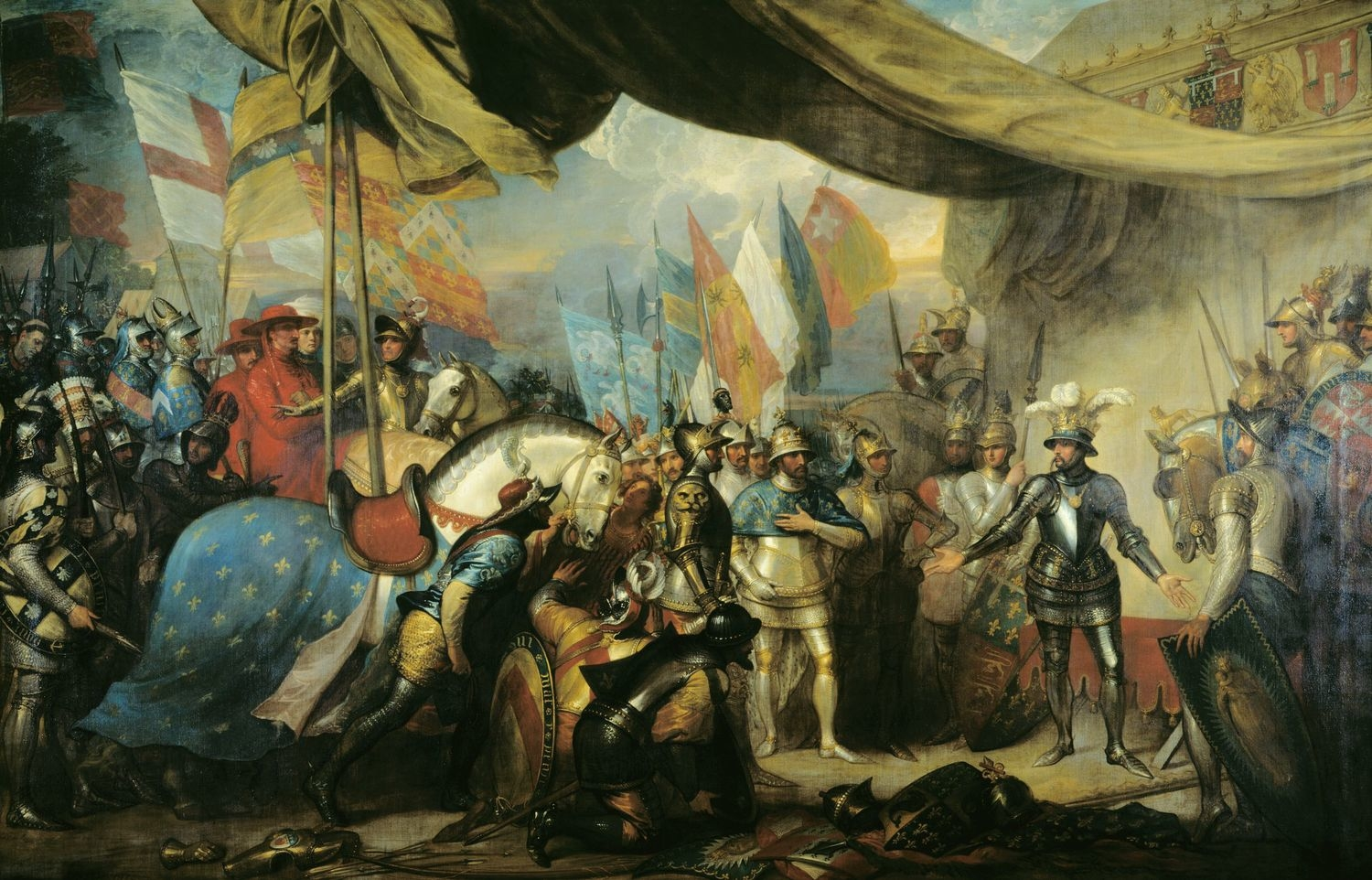
Edward, The Black Prince, receiving King John of France after the Battle of Poitiers, 1788

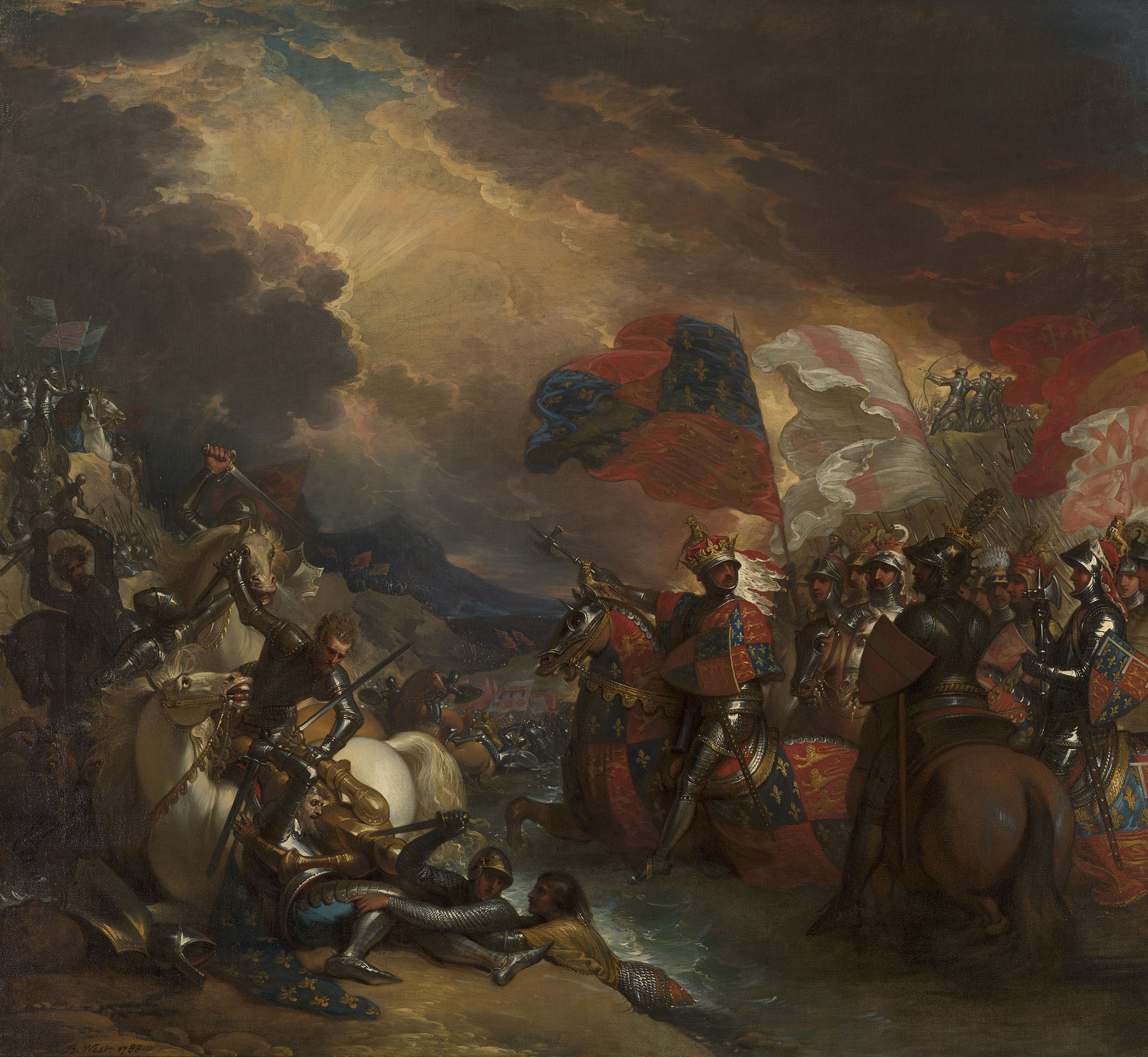
Edward III Crossing the Somme, 1788

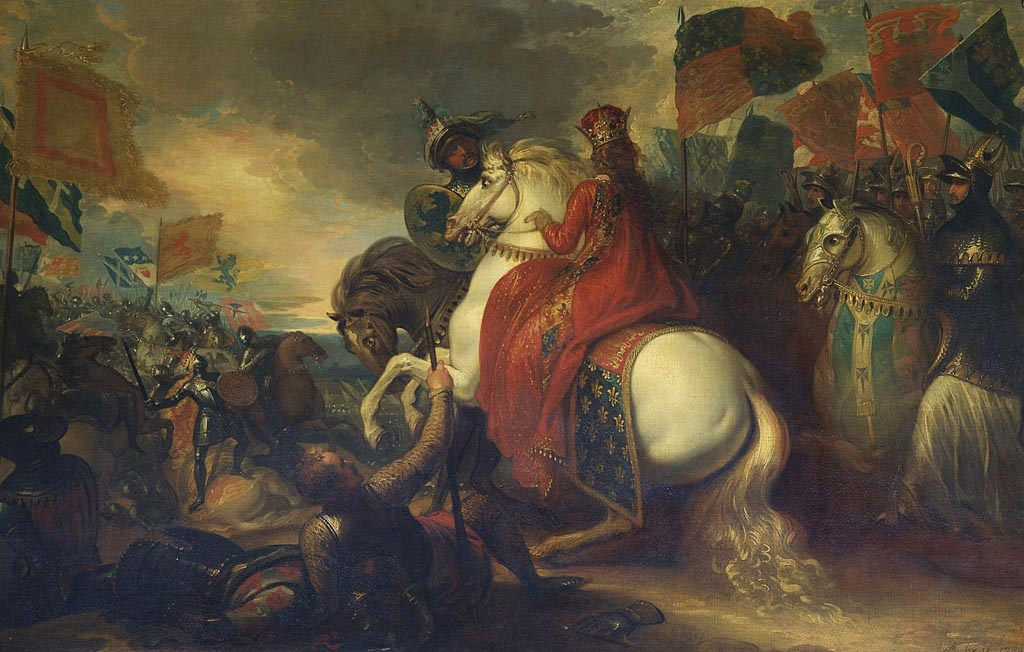
Queen Philippa at the Battle of Neville's Cross, 1789

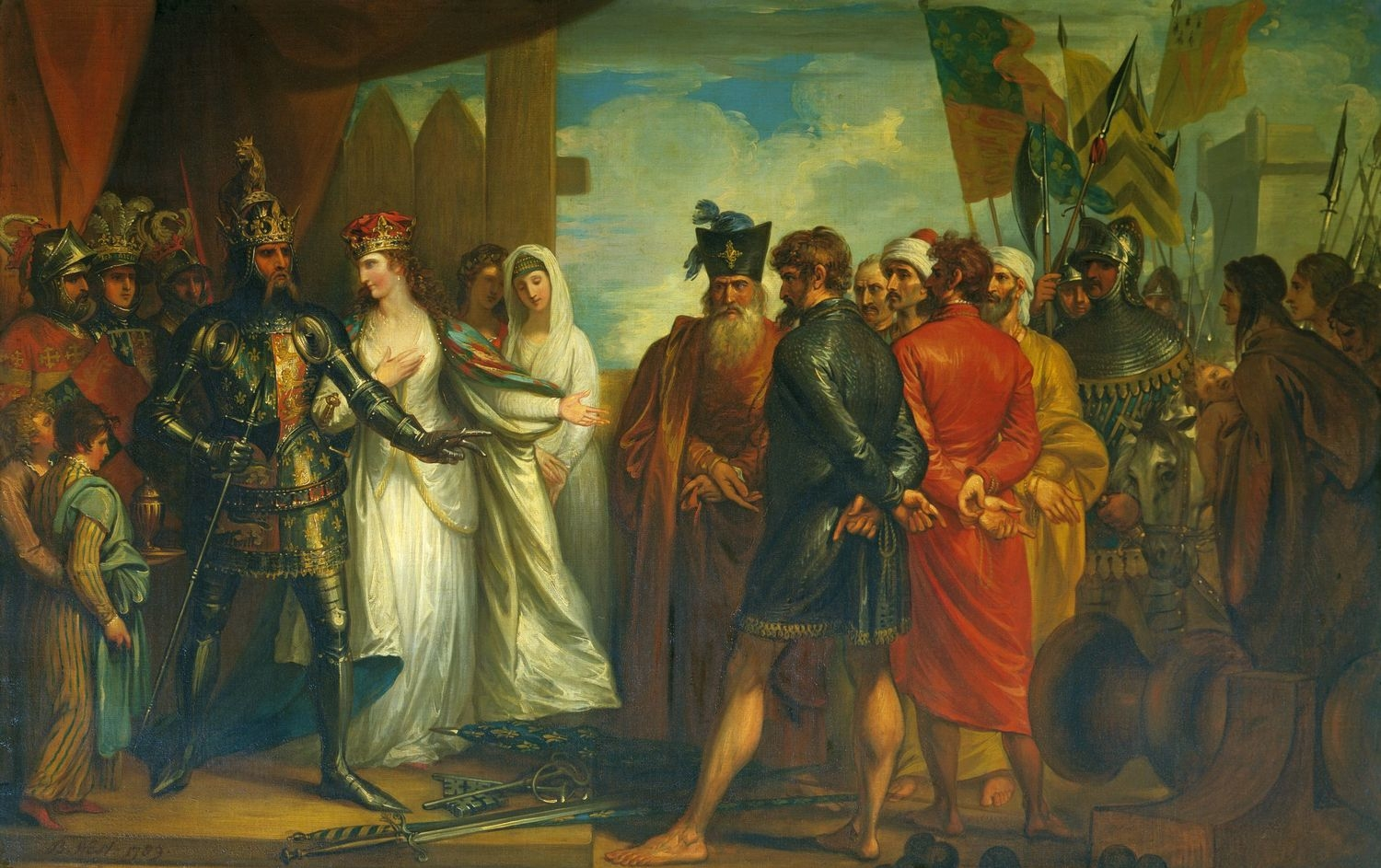
The Burghers of Calais, 1789

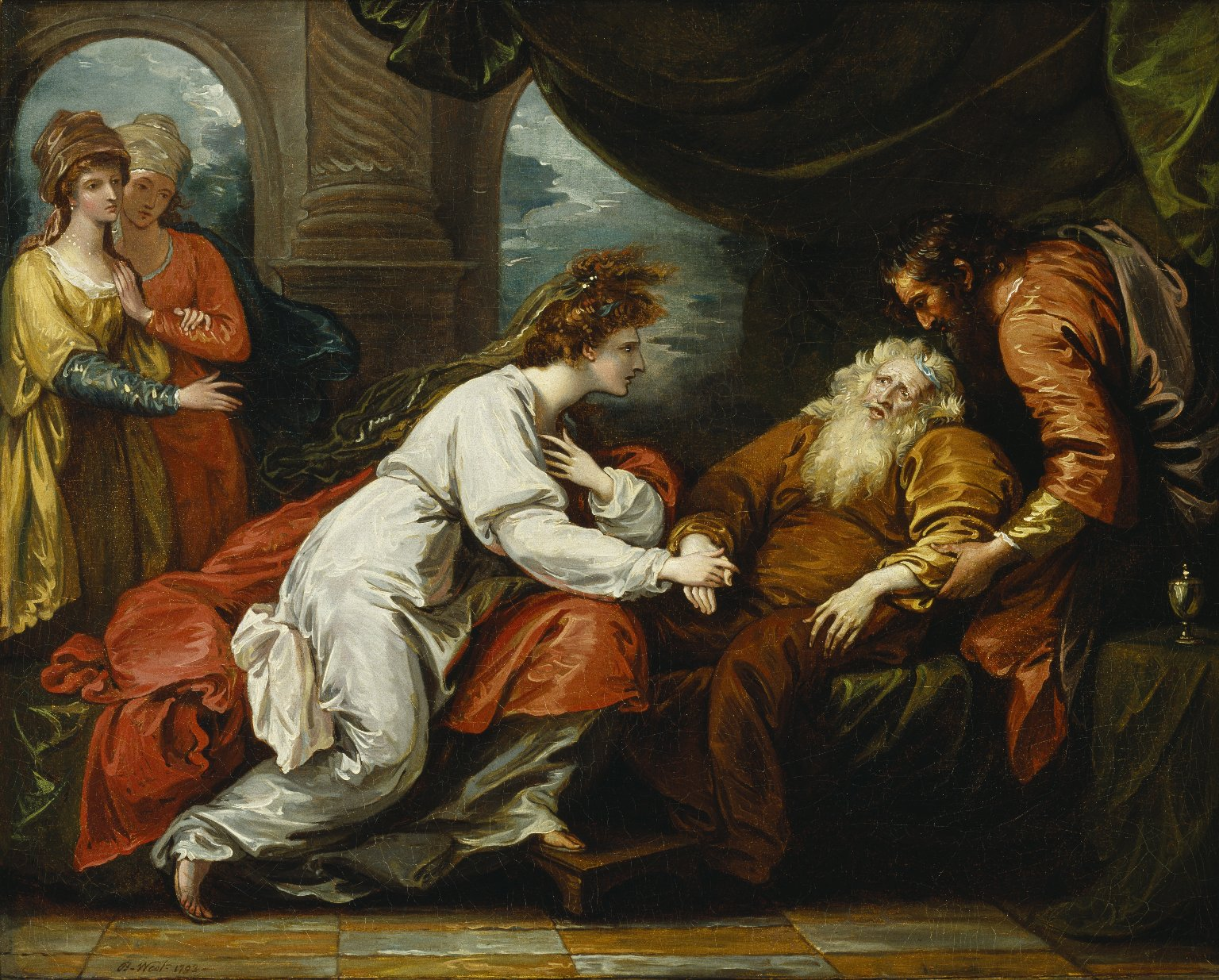
King Lear and Cordelia, 1793

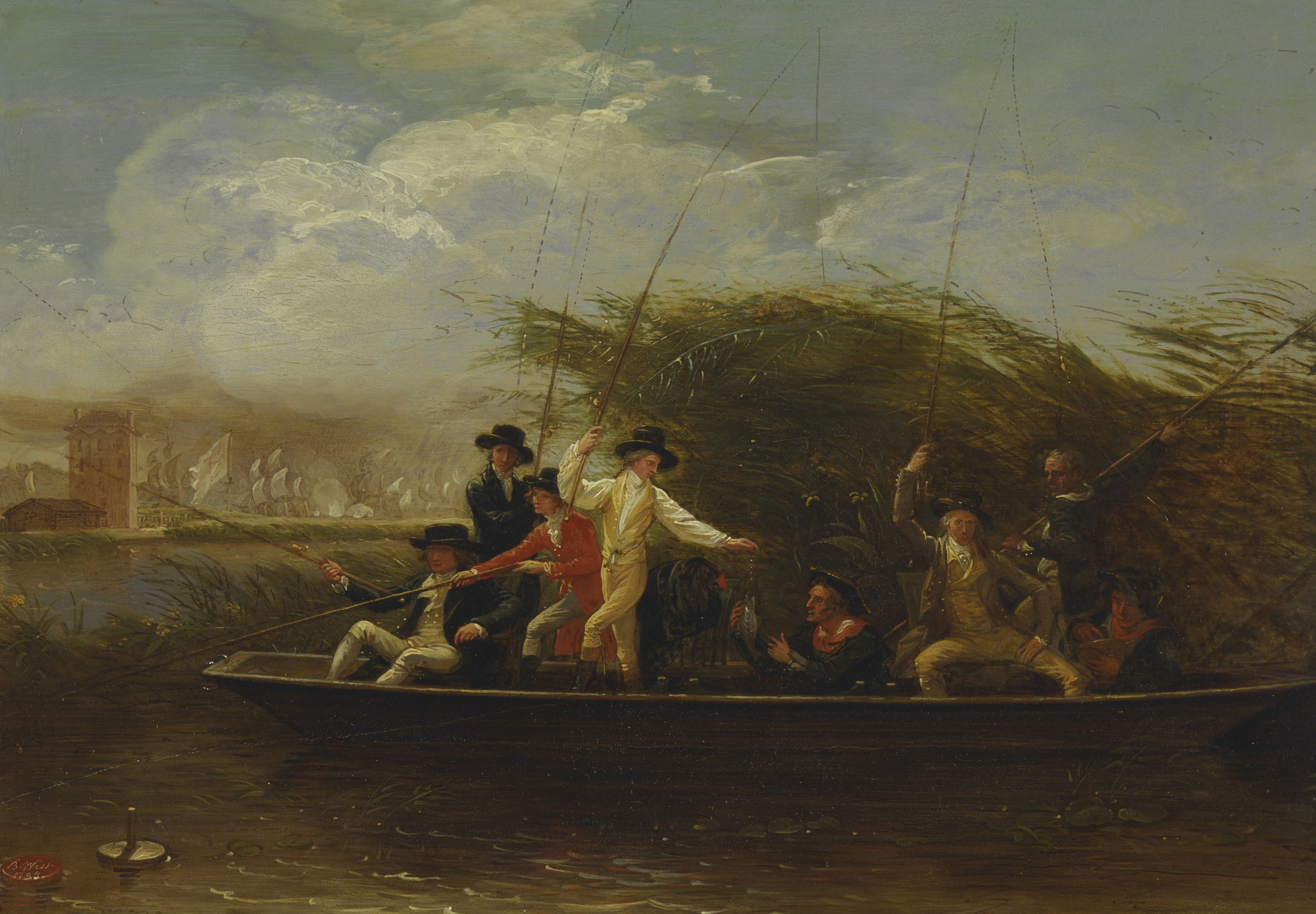
Gentlemen Fishing, 1794

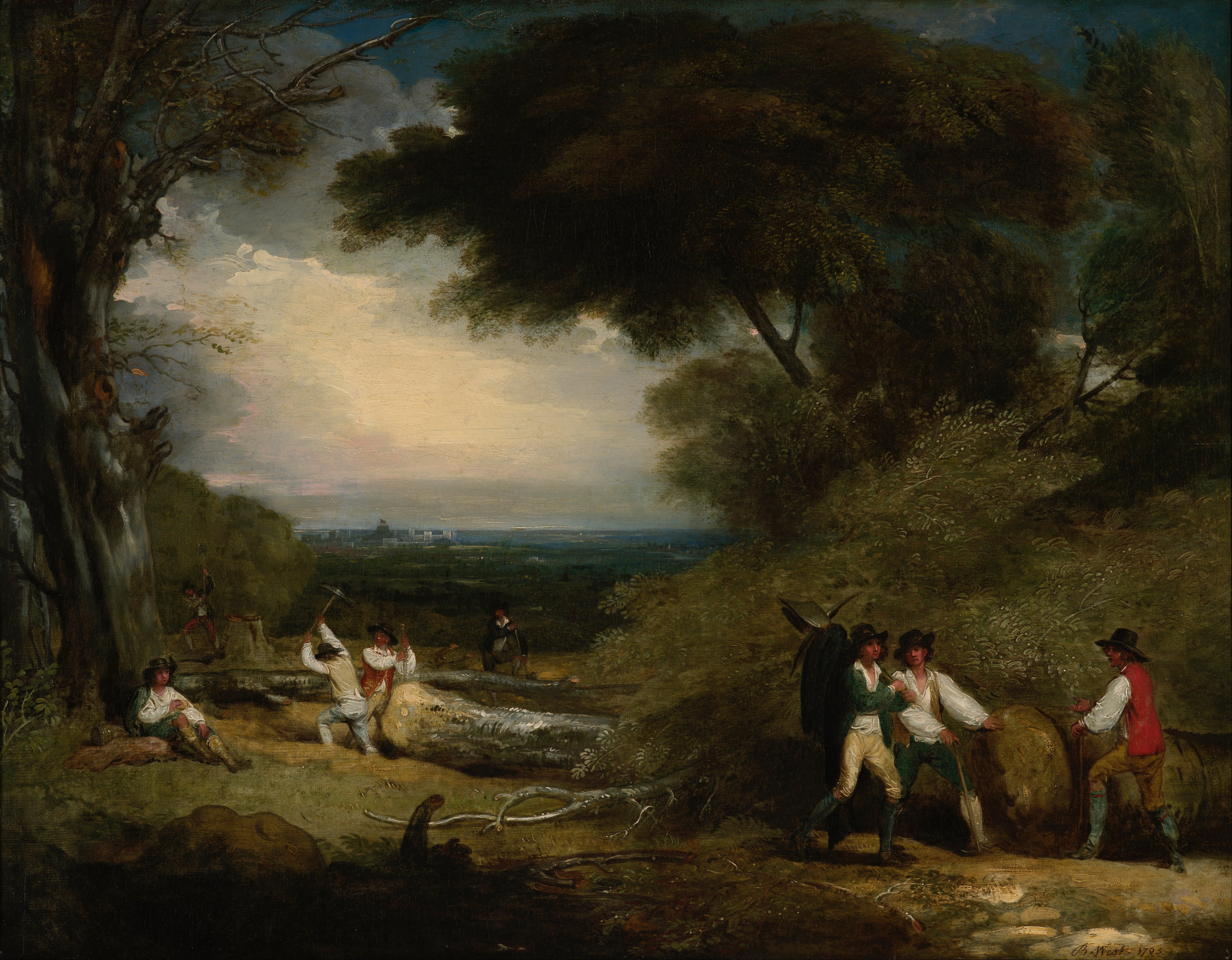
Woodcutters in Windsor Park, 1795

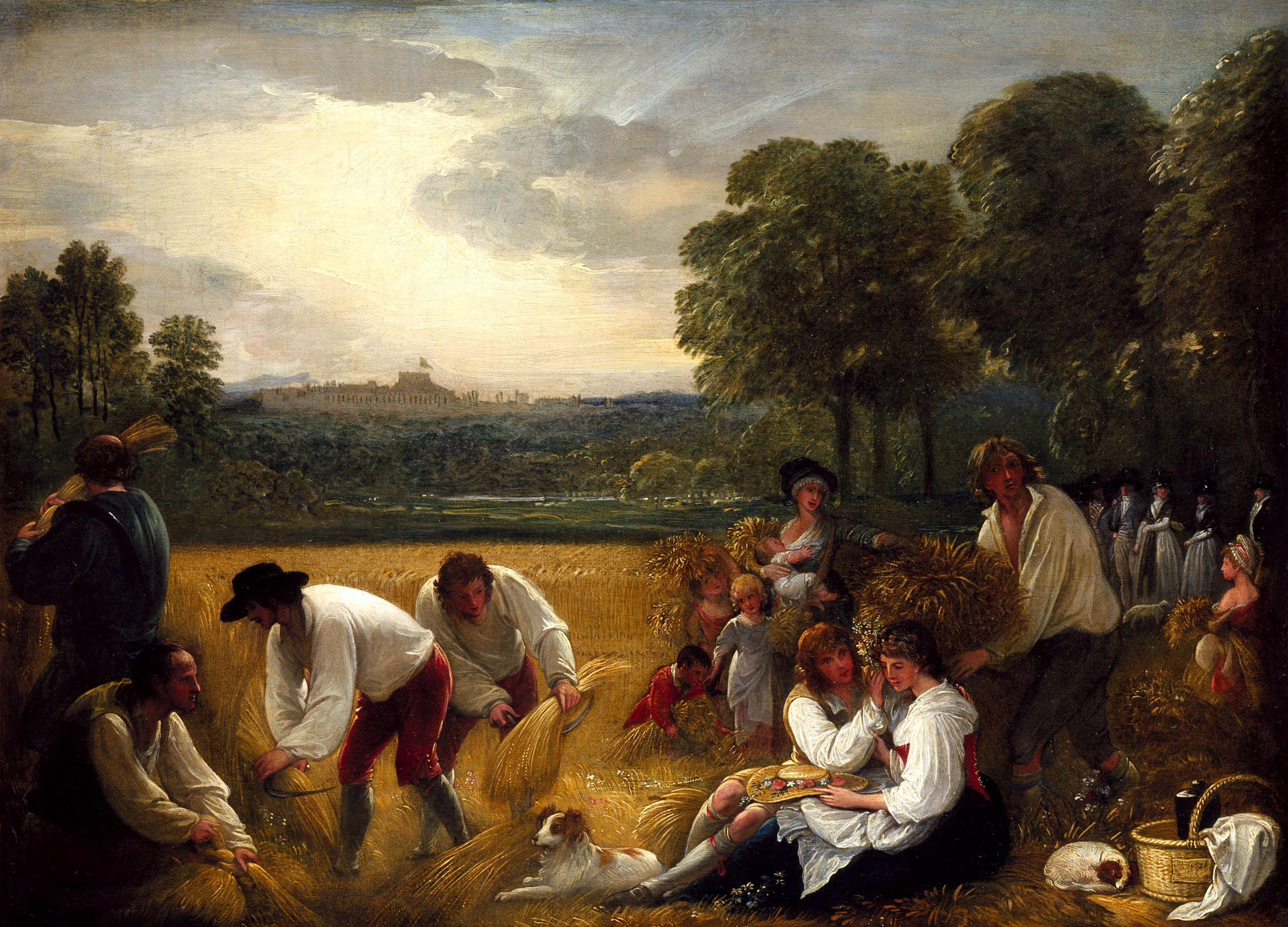
Harvesting at Windsor, 1795

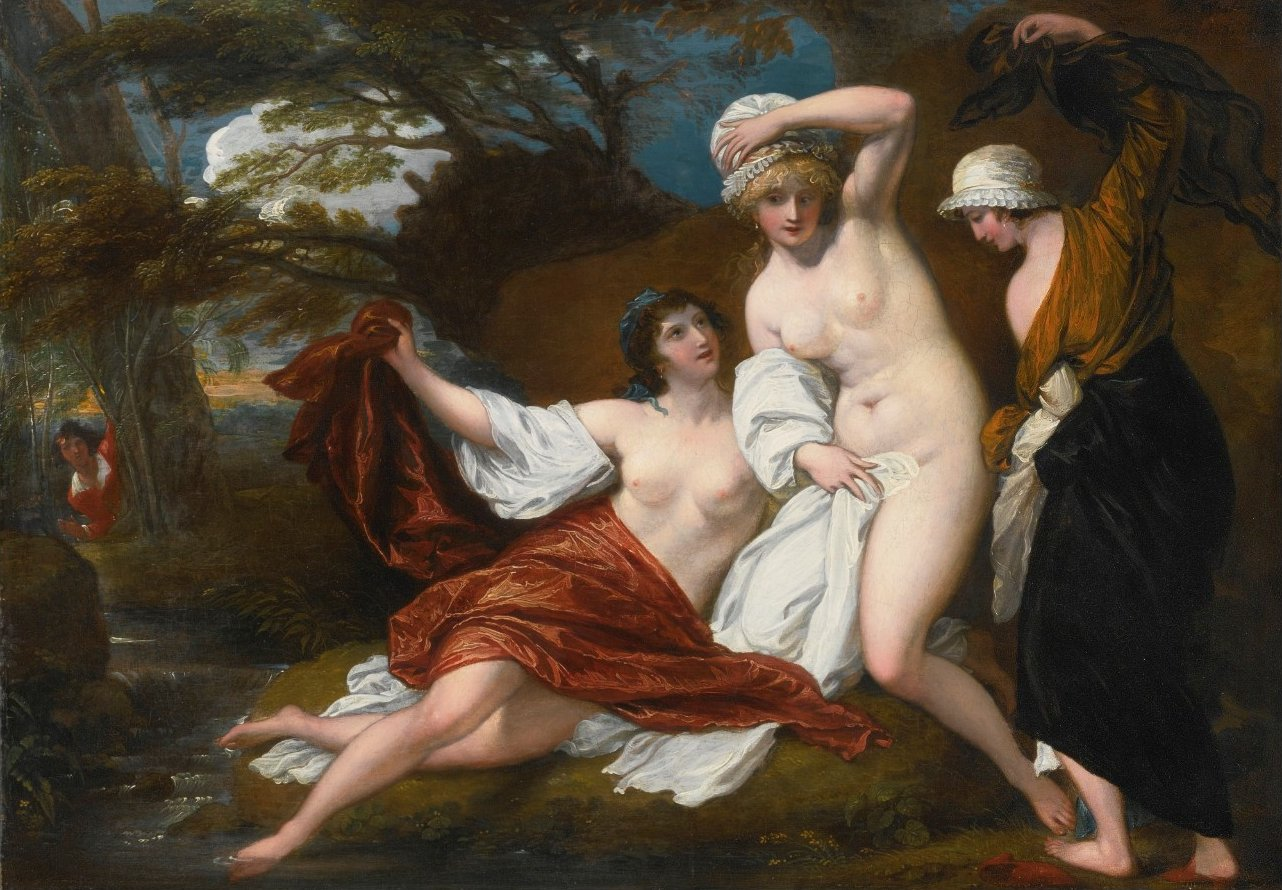
Musidora and Her Two Companions, 1795

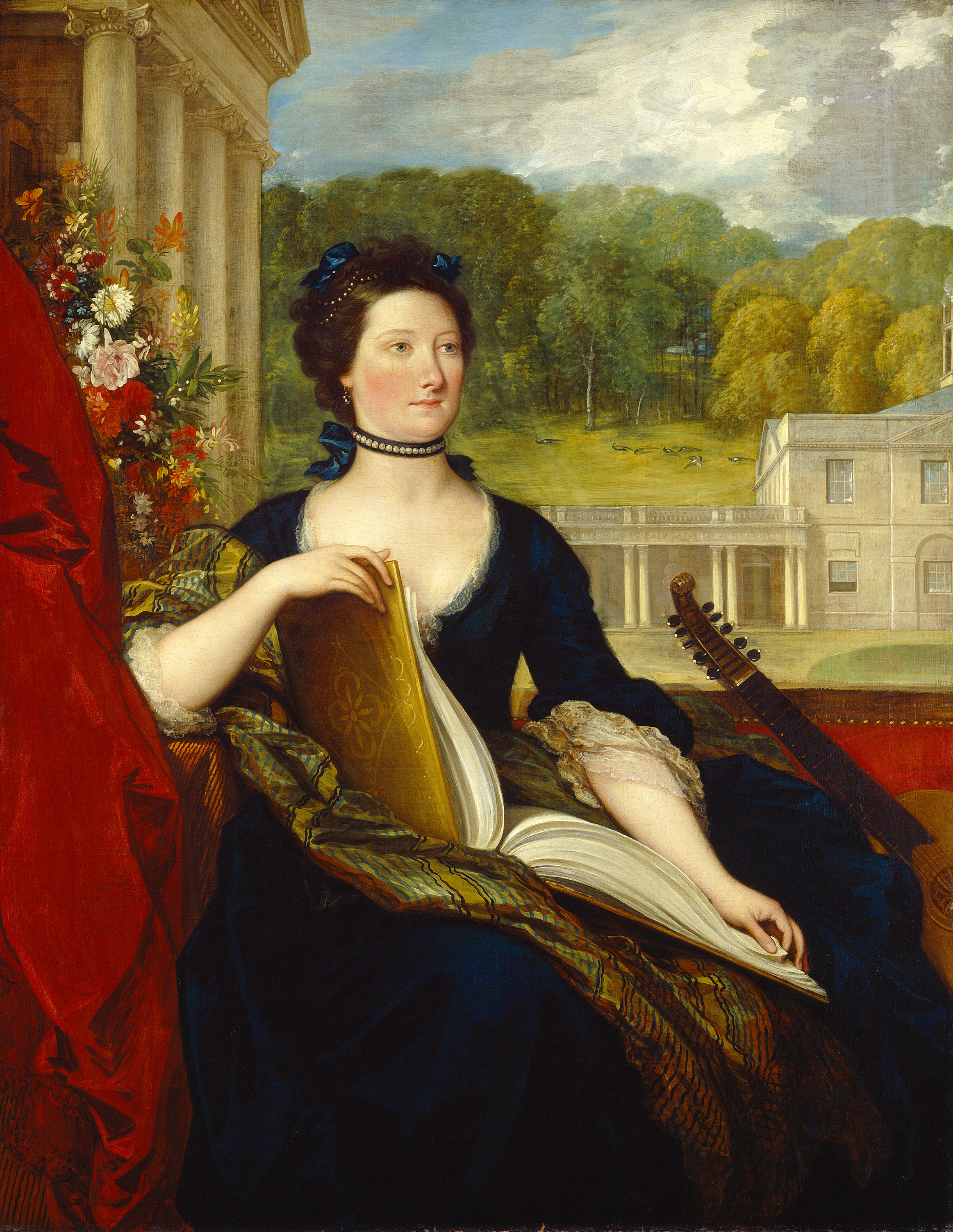
Portrait of Maria Beckford, 1799

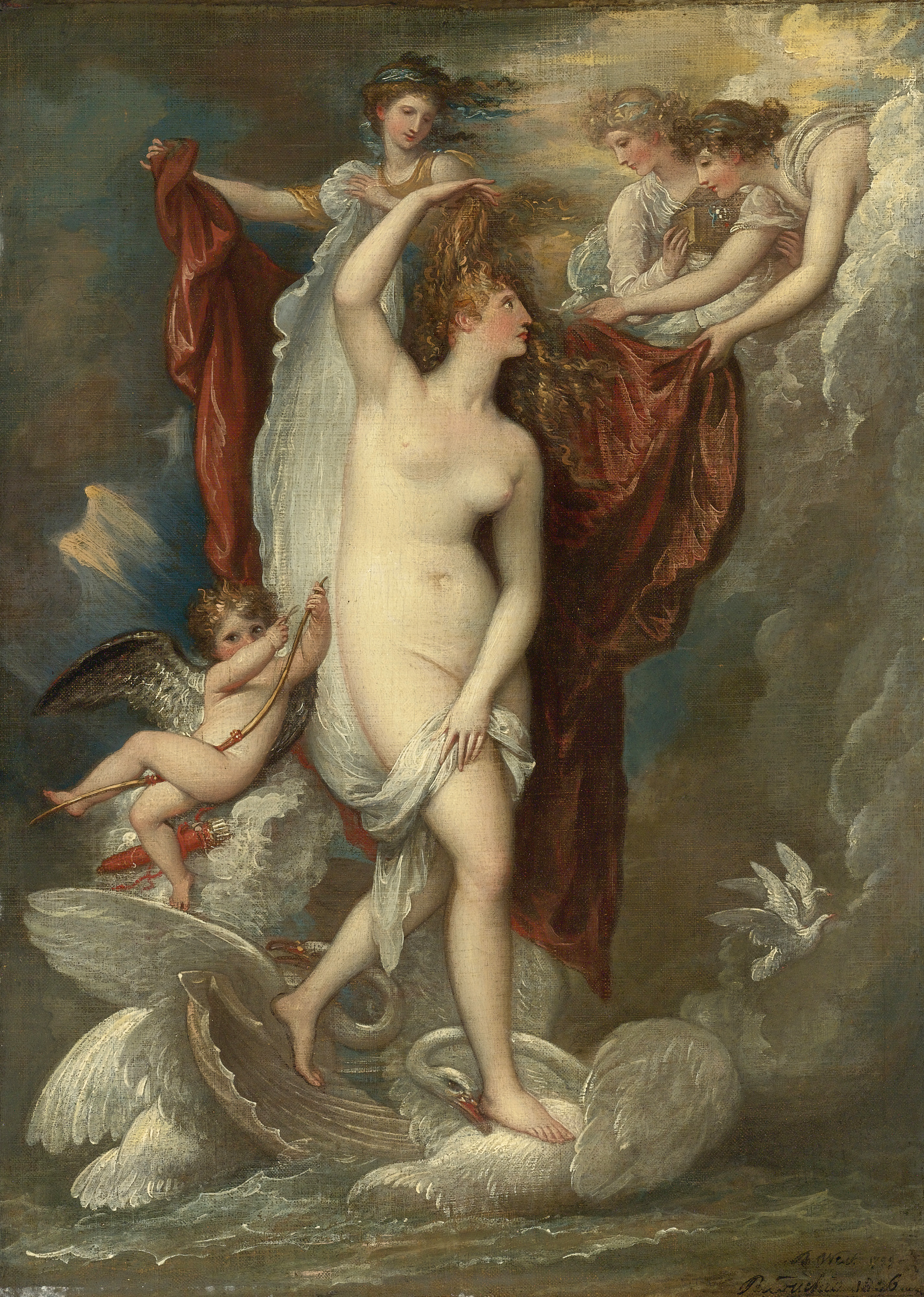
Venus At Her Birth Attired By The Three Graces, 1800

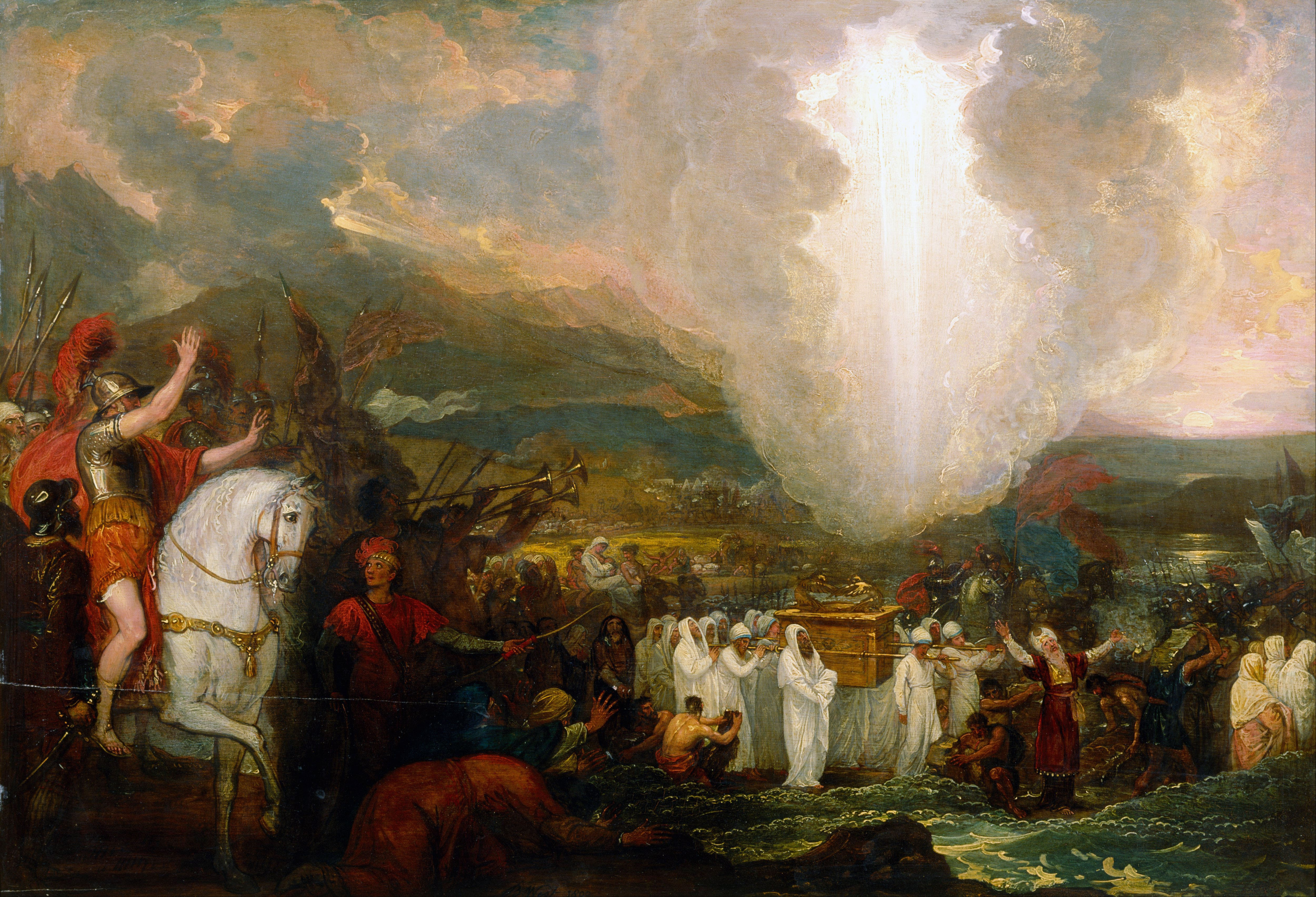
Joshua passing the River Jordan with the Ark of the Covenant, 1800

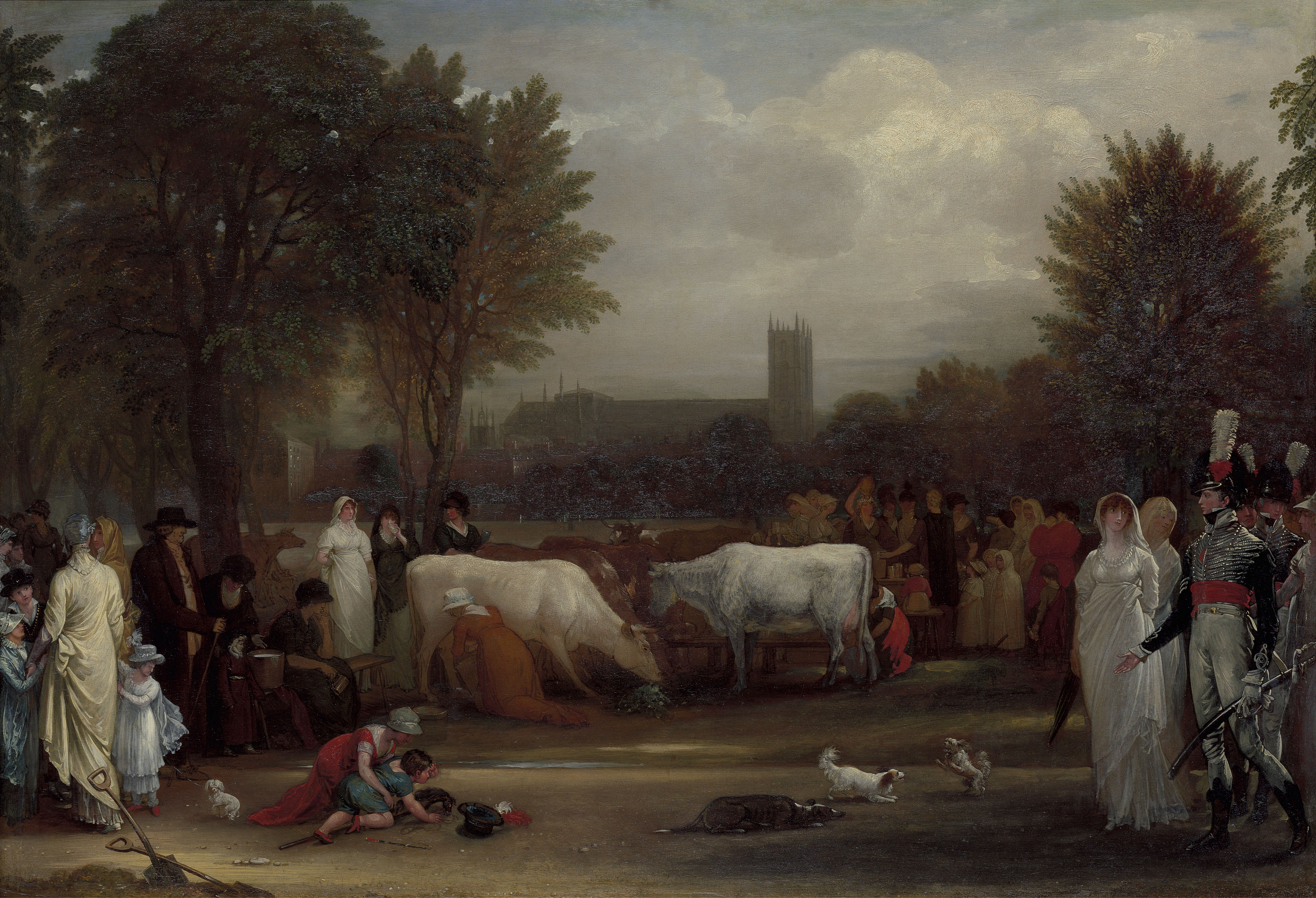
Milkmaids in St. James's Park, 1801

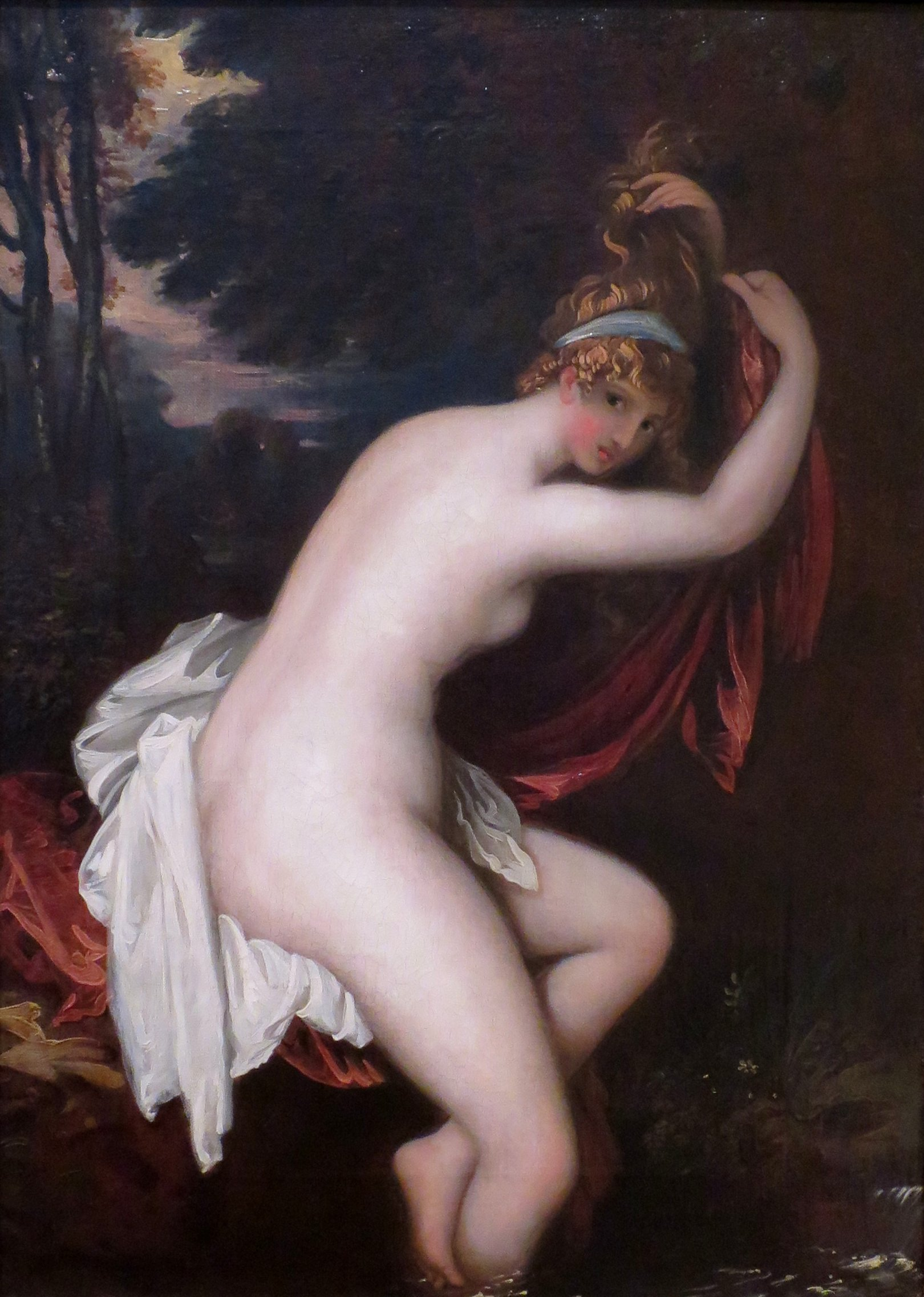
Arethusa, 1802

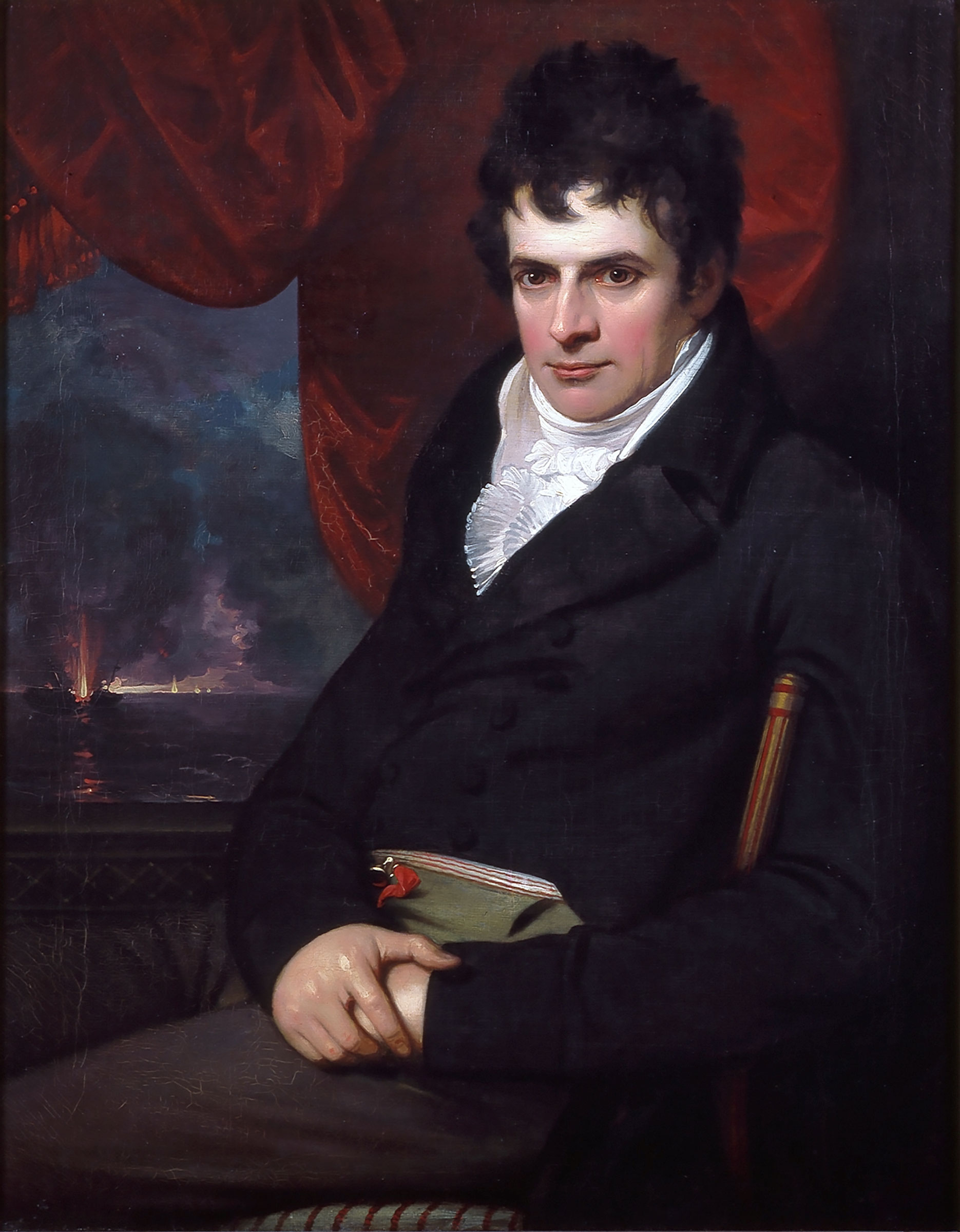
Portrait of Robert Fulton, 1806

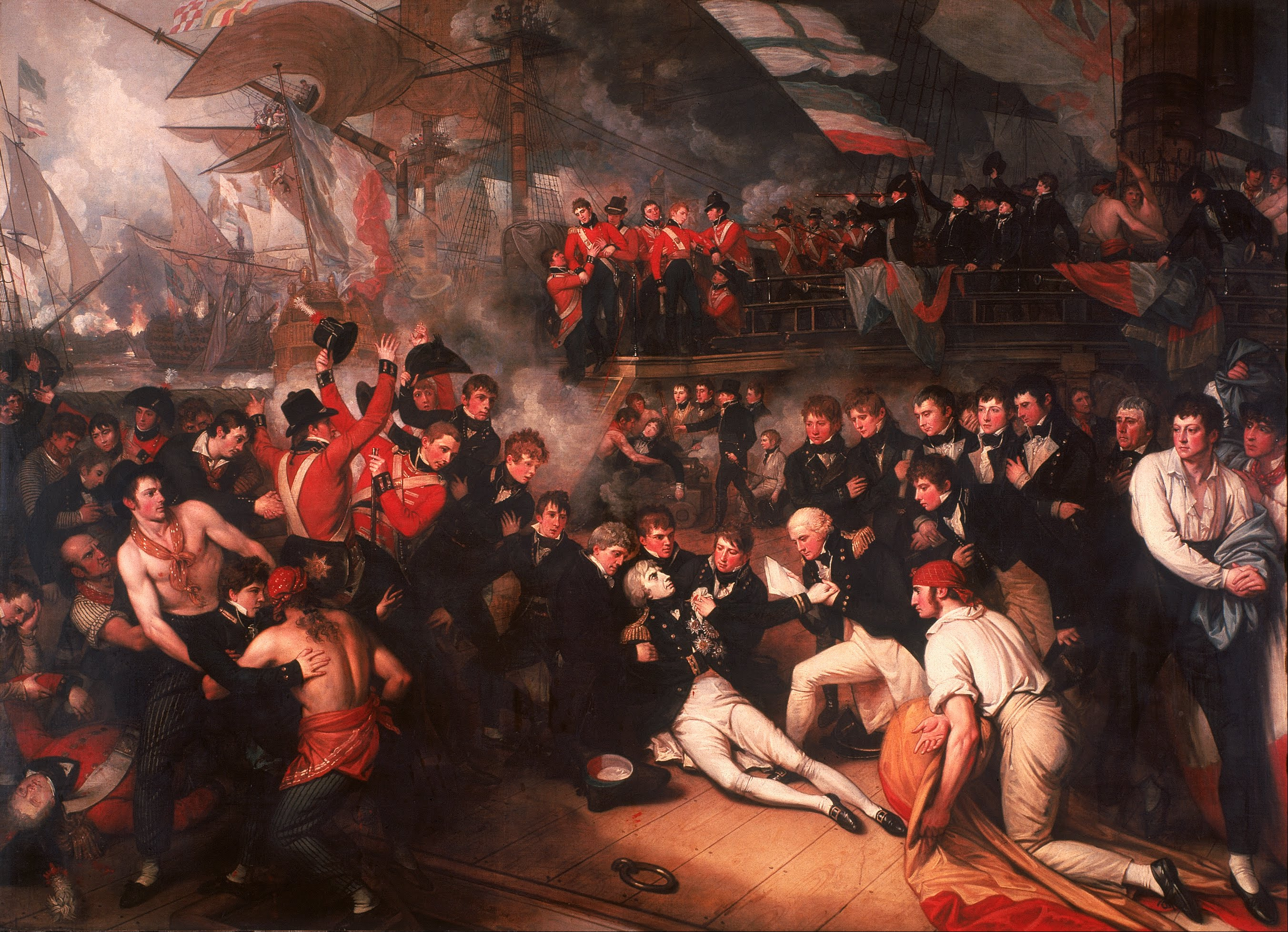
The Death of Nelson, 1806

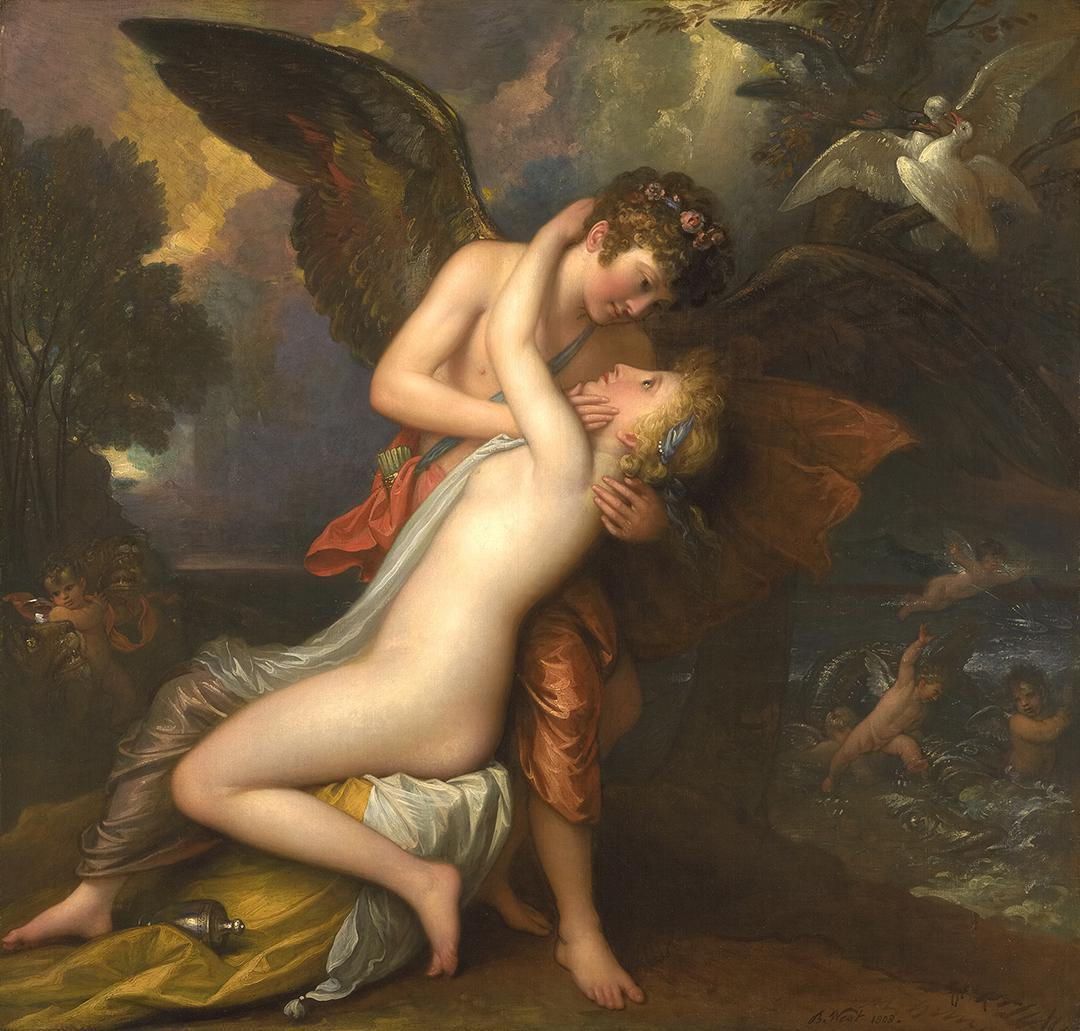
Cupid and Psyche, 1808

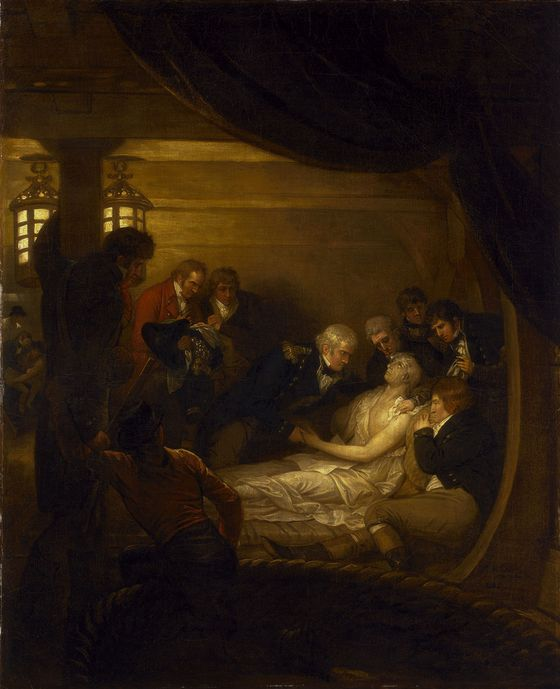
The Death of Lord Nelson in the Cockpit of the Victory, 1808

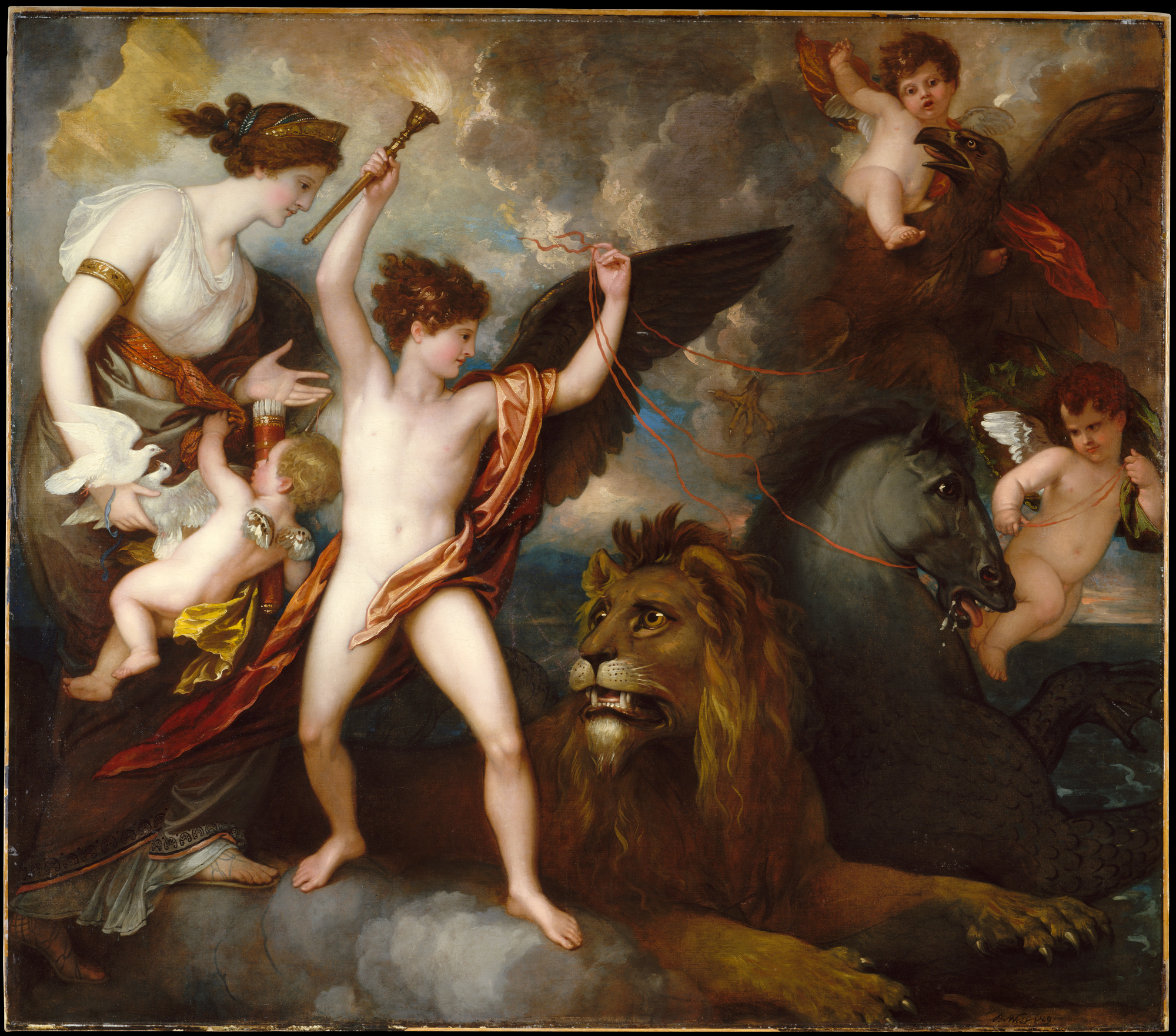
Omnia Vincit Amor, 1809

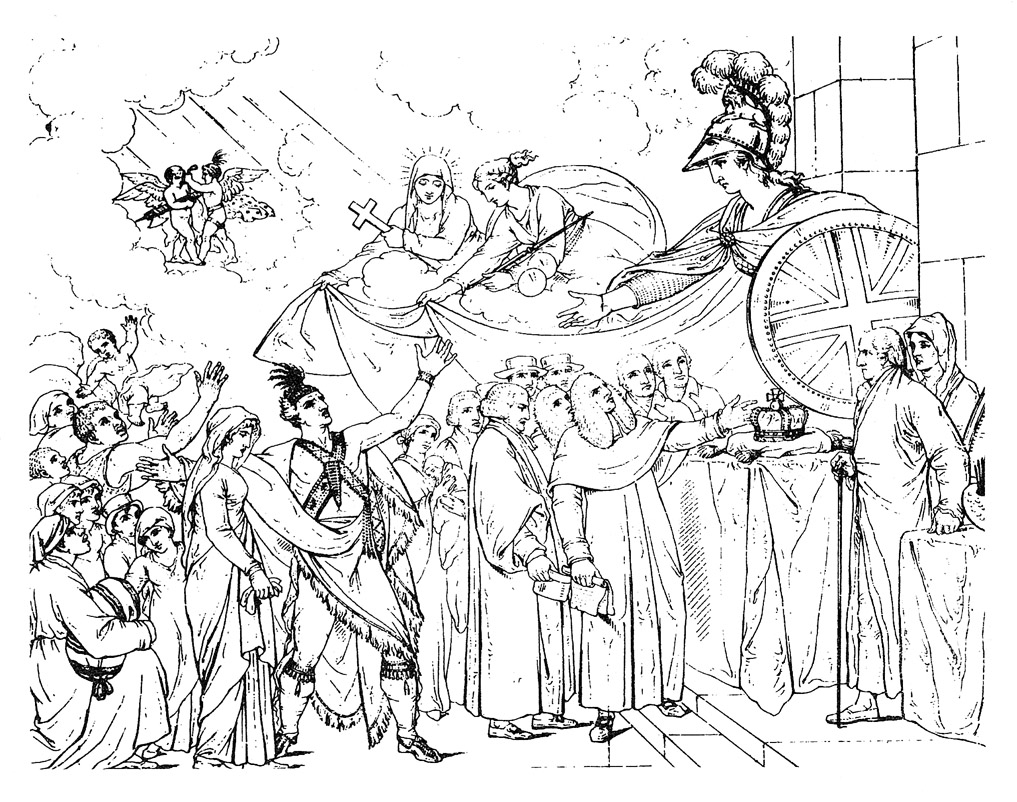
Reception of the American Loyalists by Great Britain in the Year 1783, 1812, engraving by Henry Moses

Christ Rejected, Study, 1811, Memorial Art Gallery, Rochester, NY

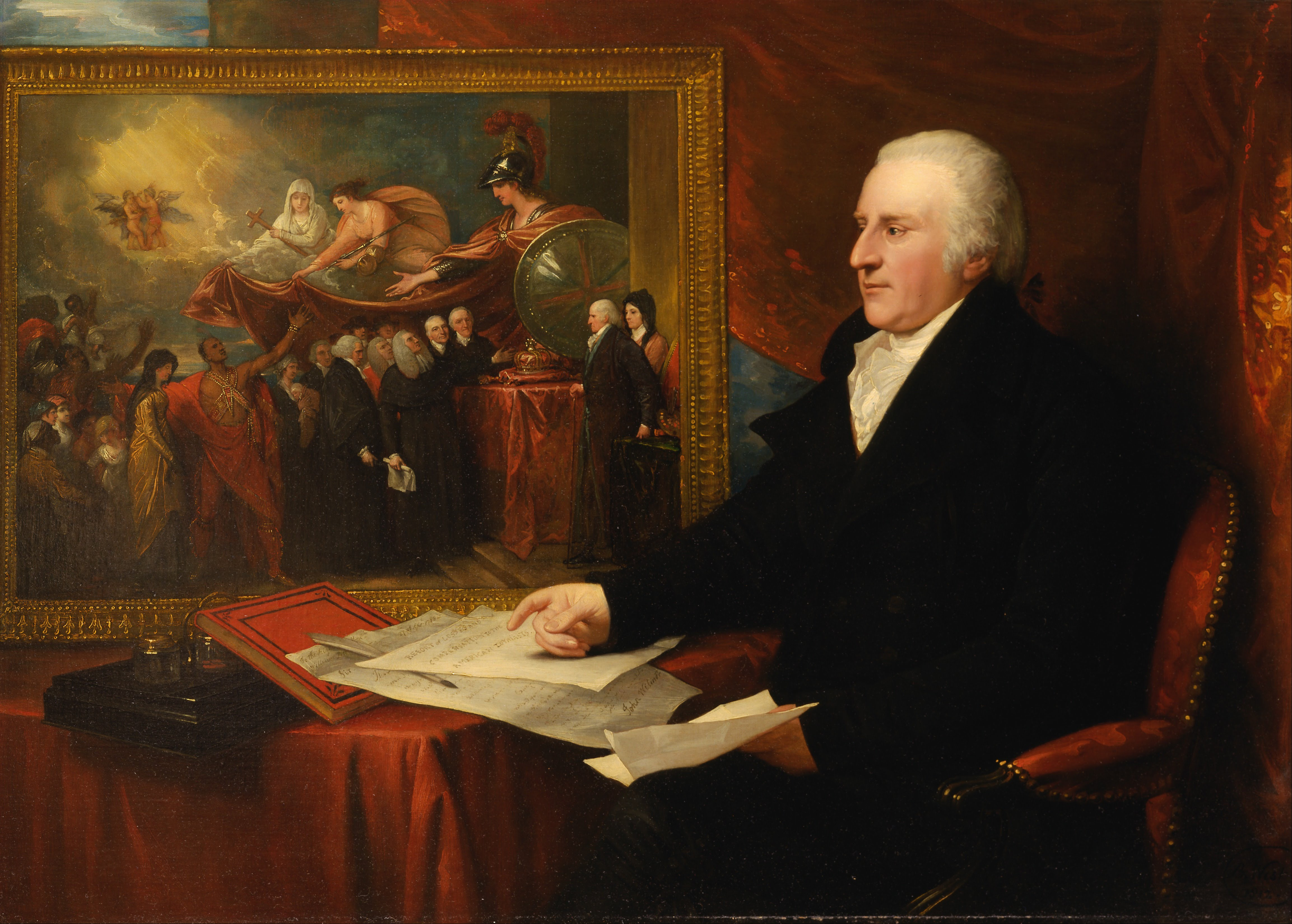
John Eardley Wilmot, 1812, with Reception of the American Loyalists in the background

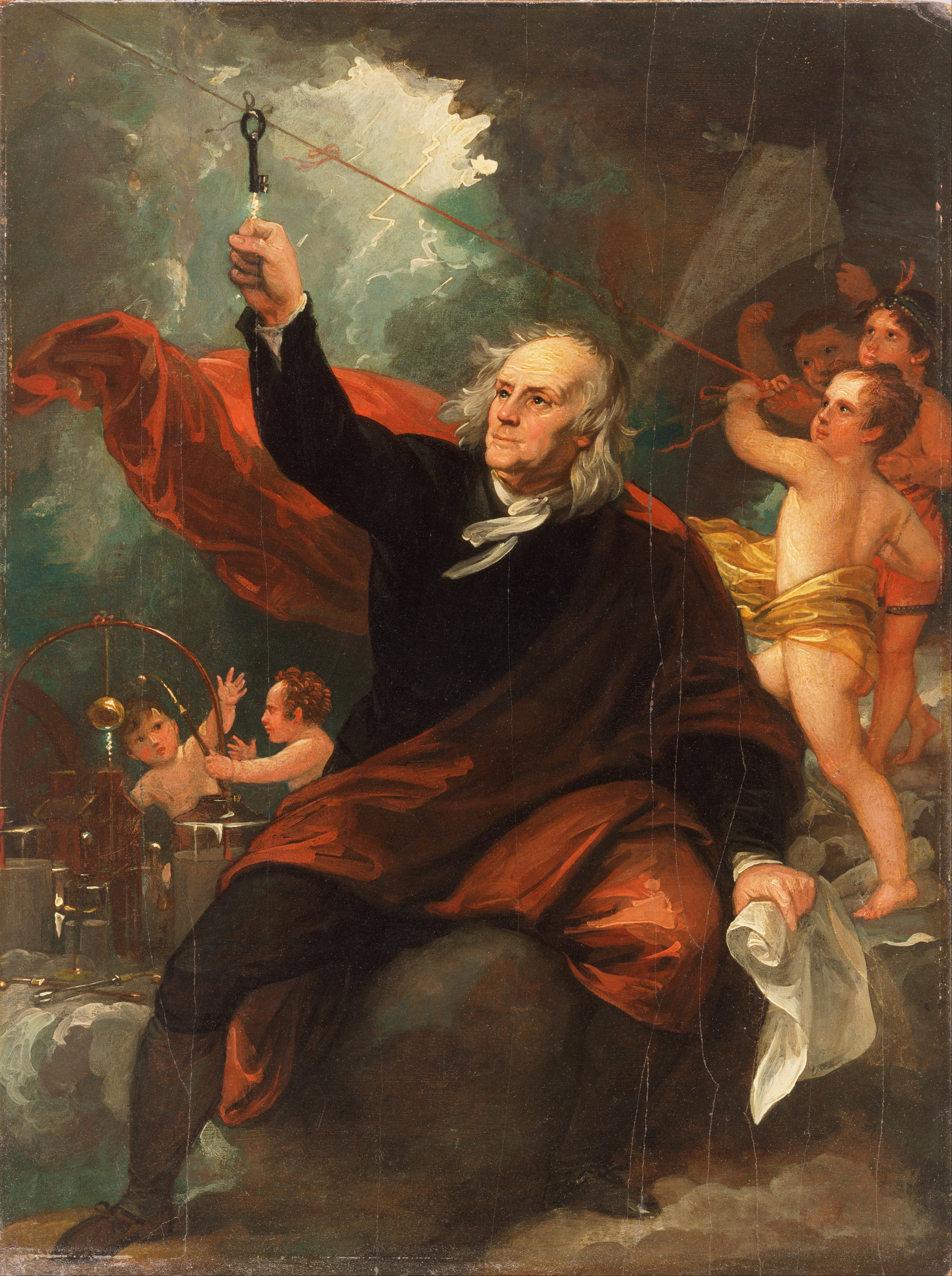
Benjamin Franklin Drawing Electricity from the Sky, 1816

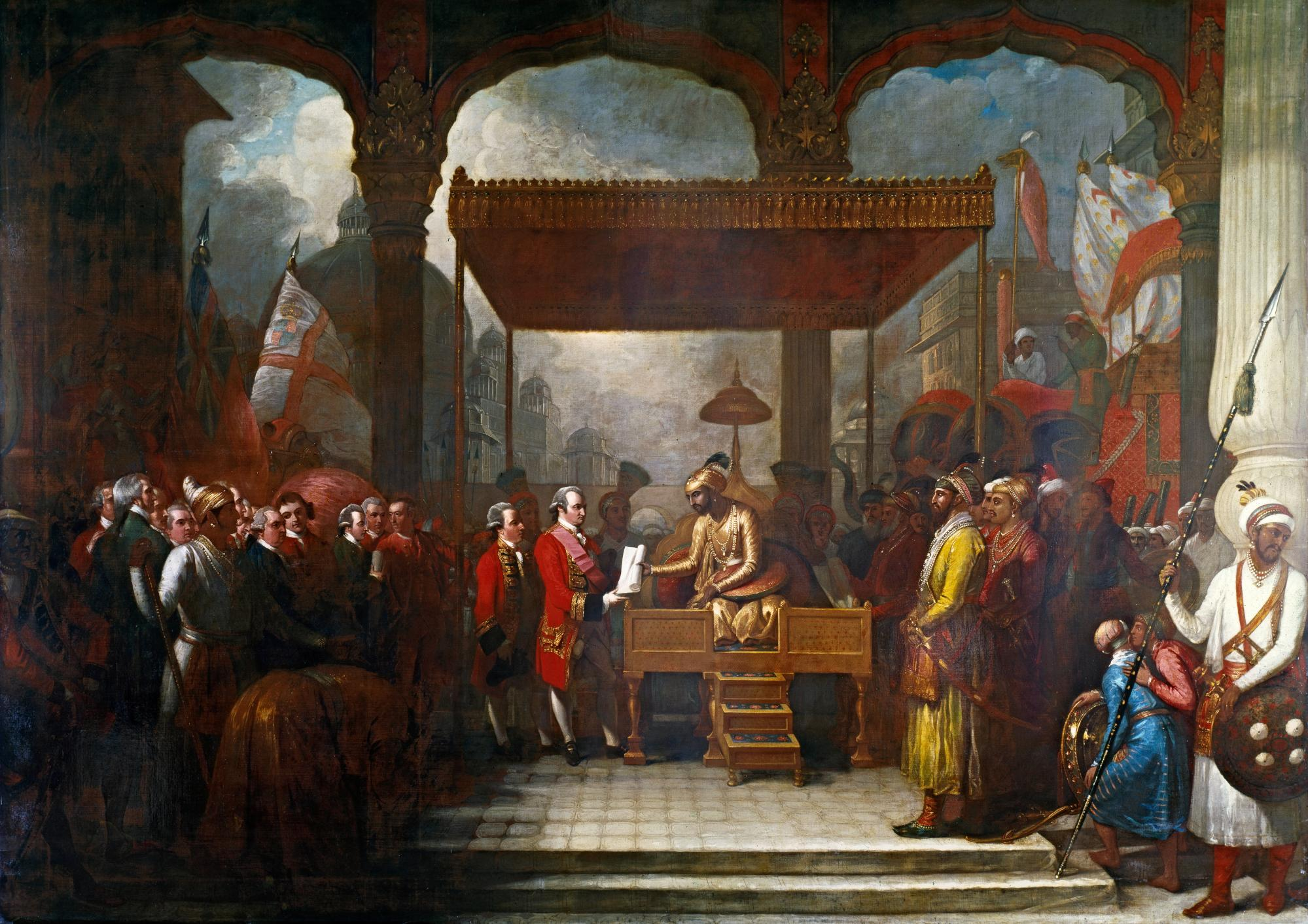
The signing of the Treaty of Allahabad, 1765, between the British Governor of Bengal Robert Clive and Mughal Emperor Shah Alam, 1818, British Museum

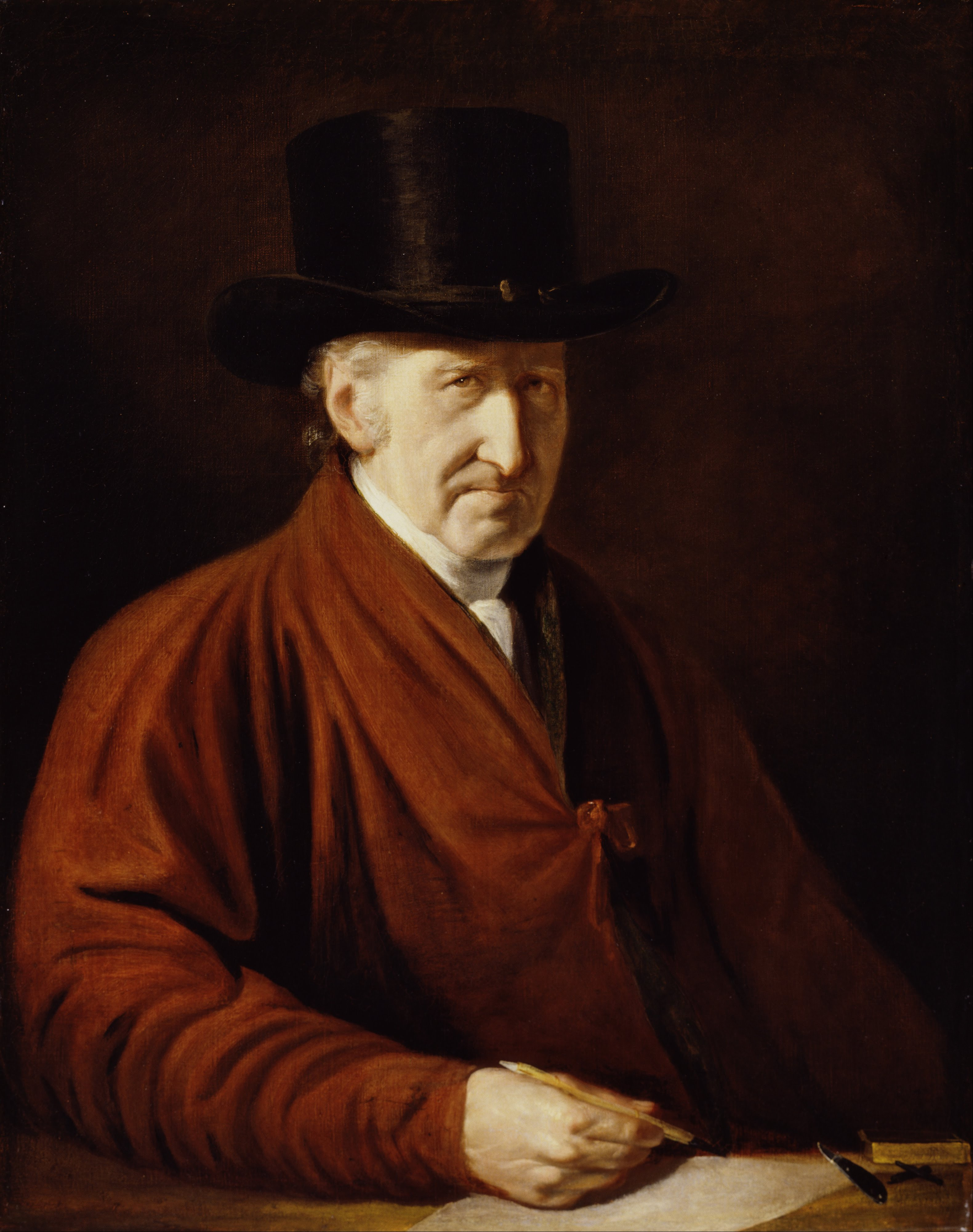
Self-portrait, 1819

== Works ==
- John Sedley, view
- Portrait of a Gentleman, view
- Presentation of the Queen of Sheba at the Court of King Solomon, view
- The Envoys Returning from the Promised Land, view

== Sources ==
- Angelo, Henry (1828). Reminiscences of Henry Angelo, with memoirs of his late father and friends, including numerous original anecdotes and curious traits of the most celebrated characters that have flourished during the last eighty years (Vol. 1). London: H. Colburn.
- Galt, John (1816). The life and studies of Benjamin West ... prior to his arrival in England. Philadelphia: Moses Thomas – via archive.org.
- Galt, John (1820). The Life, Studies, and Works of Benjamin West, Esq., President of the Royal Academy of London. T. Cadell and W. Davies – via archive.org.
- Galt, John (1832). The progress of genius : or authentic memoirs of the early life of Benjamin West. Boston: Abridged for the use of young persons. Leonard C. Bowles – via archive.org.
- von Erffa, Helmut; Staley, Allen (1986). The Paintings of Benjamin West. New Haven, Connecticut.
- Abrams, Ann Uhry (1985). The Valiant Hero: Benjamin West and Grand-Style History Painting. Washington.
- Flexner, James Thomas (1952). "Benjamin West's American Neo-Classicism". New-York Historical Society Quarterly. 36 (1): 5–41. Reprinted in America's Old Masters (New York, 1967), pp. 315–40.
- Rather, Susan (June 2004). "Benjamin West, John Galt, and the Biography of 1816". The Art Bulletin. 86 (2): 324–45. doi:10.2307/3177420. JSTOR 3177420. S2CID 162301706.
- Sherman, Frederic Fairchild (1919). Benjamin West. American Painters of Yesterday and Today. New York – via archive.org.

Cultural offices
Preceded by Joshua Reynolds	President of the Royal Academy; 1792–1805	Succeeded by James Wyatt
Preceded by James Wyatt	President of the Royal Academy; 1806–1820	Succeeded by Sir Thomas Lawrence
