= Regulus (Turner) =

1828 painting by J. M. W. Turner

- Regulus Leaving Rome to Return to Carthage
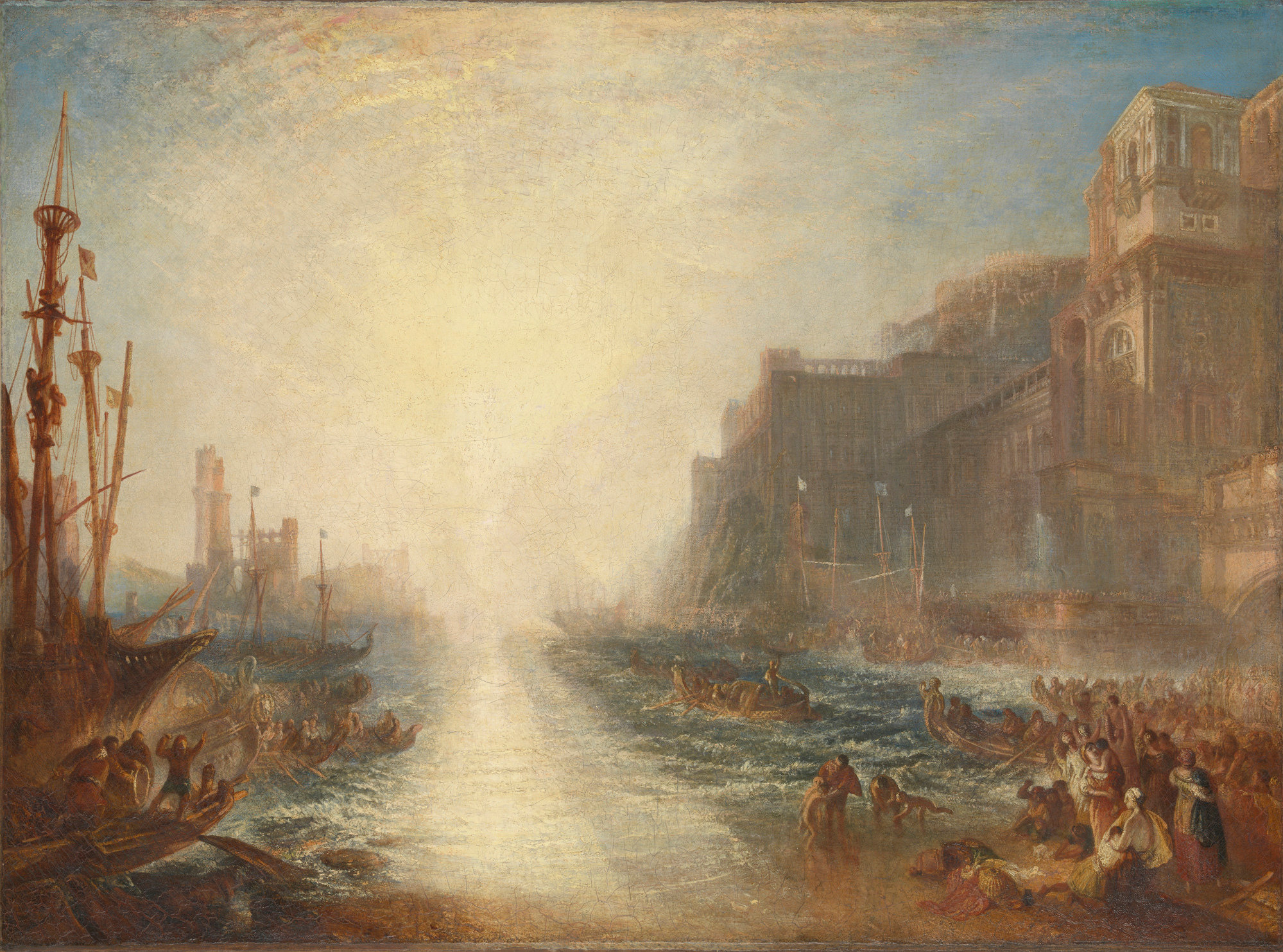
- Artist: J. M. W. Turner
- Year: 1828 (overpainted c.1829–1837, and 1837)
- Medium: Oil on canvas
- Dimensions: 89.5 cm × 123.8 cm (35.2 in × 48.7 in)
- Location: Tate Britain, London
- Website: www.tate.org.uk/...n00519

Regulus (Note: Also referred to as Regulus Leaving Rome to Return to Carthage, or simply Regulus Leaving Rome.) is an oil painting by the English artist J. M. W. Turner, currently housed in Tate Britain, London. It was initially painted in 1828 and overpainted twice, first between 1829 and 1837, and again in 1837. The painting is based on a legend about the Roman consul and general Marcus Atilius Regulus, in which he was captured by Carthaginian forces and executed after refusing a prisoner exchange. Many accounts add that he was tortured by being forced to stare at the sun, blinding him. The painting depicts a harbour in either Rome or Carthage, with ships and buildings surrounding the ocean. It is dominated by the large white sun in the centre.

Turner originally painted and exhibited Regulus in Rome during an 1828 visit, after which it was shipped to London, where he lived. At some point during or after shipping, the upper-left part of the canvas was torn, requiring repair and repainting. The work was kept in Turner's private gallery until 1837, when it was overpainted at the British Institution during a varnishing day, an event where artists would make final revisions and varnish their paintings in front of a private audience before an exhibition. It subsequently gained notoriety, inspiring two derivative paintings and two engravings. Regulus was a controversial work, criticised heavily during its exhibitions and by contemporaries such as Turner's supporter John Ruskin. In 1863, it was stabbed by a man displeased with Turner’s technique and the artist himself. The painting has also suffered from flaking paint.

Exactly what the painting depicts is debated by scholars. Some believe the painting depicts Regulus leaving Carthage for Rome, while others argue it shows his return. Another point of contention is whether Regulus is a figure in the painting, whether it is from his perspective as he was blinded, or whether it is meant to depict Regulus's life in its entirety, conveying both aspects. Scholars have supported their interpretations using evidence drawn from the titles of subsequent engravings, Turner's other paintings, and the sources on Regulus from which Turner drew.

== Background ==
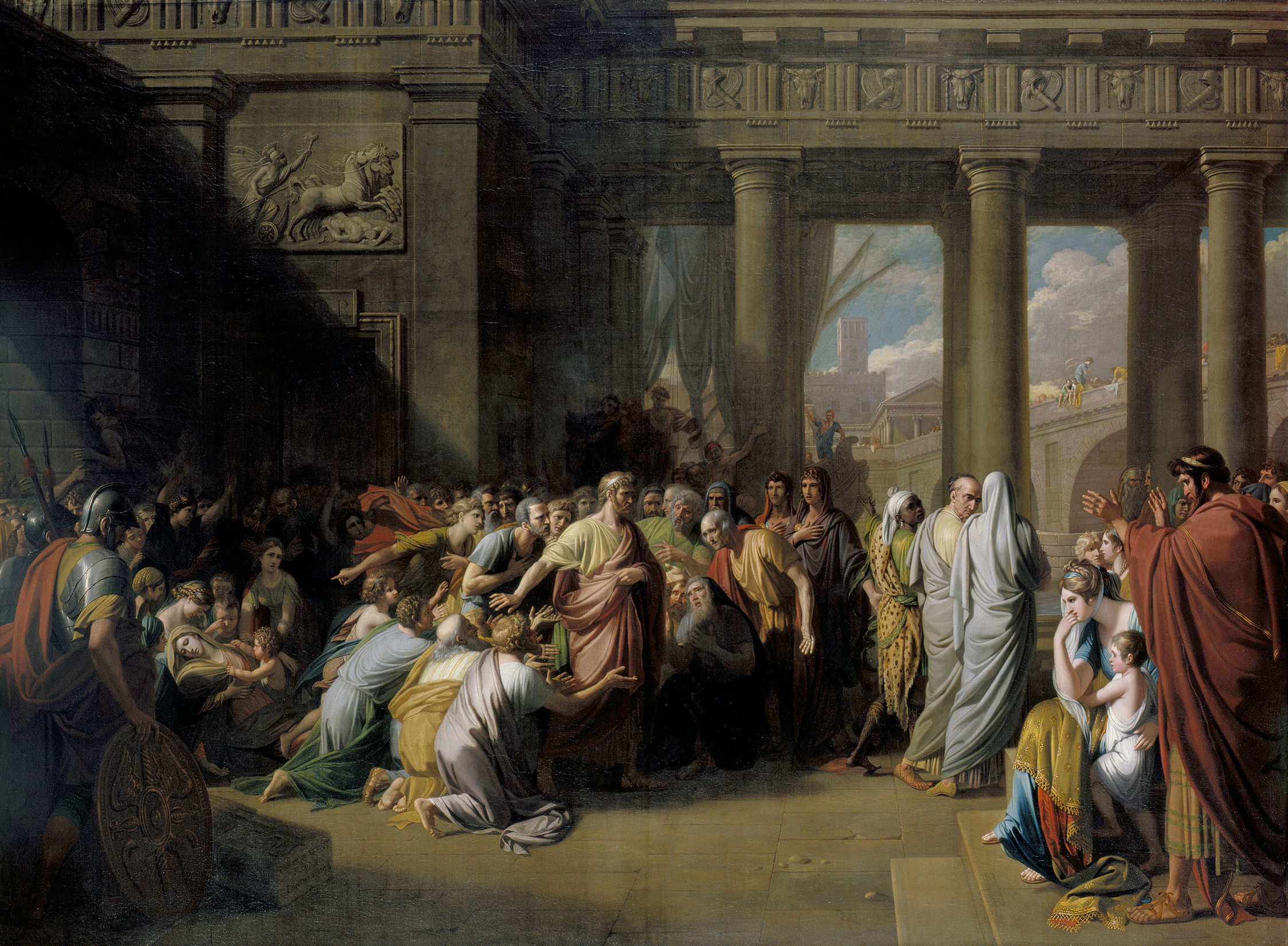
The Departure of Regulus (1769), Benjamin West

Regulus is an oil painting by the English artist J. M. W. Turner, measuring 89.5 by 123.8 centimetres (2 ft 11 in × 4 ft 1 in). The painting depicts a harbour, which frames the large white sun in the centre. The titular figure, Marcus Atilius Regulus, was a Roman consul and general who served in the First Punic War. He was captured by Carthaginian forces during the Battle of the Bagradas River in 255 BC and likely died of natural causes afterwards. Legends emerged, however, spread by Roman historians such as Gaius Sempronius Tuditanus, claiming that Regulus was instead tortured and executed by the Carthaginians.

According to these stories, Regulus's captors sent him back to Rome to negotiate a prisoner exchange, but upon his arrival he instructed the Romans to refuse, despite knowing he would be executed upon his return to Carthage. He chose not to break his parole and returned to the enemy city, after which stories tend to vary. In many accounts, Regulus was tortured by having his eyelids removed or sewn open before being forced to stare at the sun, leading to blindness. Some historians add details: Tuditanus claimed that Regulus died of sleep deprivation and Oliver Goldsmith stated that he was placed in a barrel of sharpened nails.

While not common, Regulus served as a recognisable subject for many painters during Turner's life. Paintings such as Salvator Rosa's Death of Regulus and Benjamin West's The Departure of Regulus were frequently exhibited in England during the early 1800s. These works, centred on Regulus's sacrifice, depict him as a brave, patriotic hero and promote ideas of aristocratic masculinity.

Oh! powerful beings, hail! whose stubborn soul
Even o'er itself to urge even (?) [sic] self-control.
Thus Regulus, whom every torture did await,
Denied himself admittance at the gate
Because a captive to proud Carthage power,
But his fierce (?) [sic] soul would not the Romans lower.
Not wife or children dear, or self, could hold
A moment's parley,—love made him bold,
Love of his country; for not aught beside
He loved,—but for that love he died.

— J. M. W. Turner's verse on Regulus

There were probably several sources from which Turner learned about Regulus. James Thomson, a poet who significantly influenced Turner's writing, alluded to Regulus in his poetry series The Seasons. The most descriptive source Turner likely had on Regulus was Oliver Goldsmith's Roman History, in which the torture of Regulus is vividly described. Inside the cover of his 1786 edition copy, Turner wrote the words "Regulus Return" among a list of potential subjects. (Note: Beaumont, citing Powell, quotes it as "Regulus Returns".) Turner also dedicated a verse to Regulus's patriotism in an 1811 poem he wrote to accompany George Cooke's Southern Coast engravings. (Note: While John Gage identifies this poem as "The Southern Coast", the same title as the accompanying engraving collection, the source he references only identifies the verses as extracts from an unnamed fragment of writing.) The focus on Regulus's virtue in the verse is similar to the Roman poet Horace's glorification of the general.

== History ==
=== In Rome ===
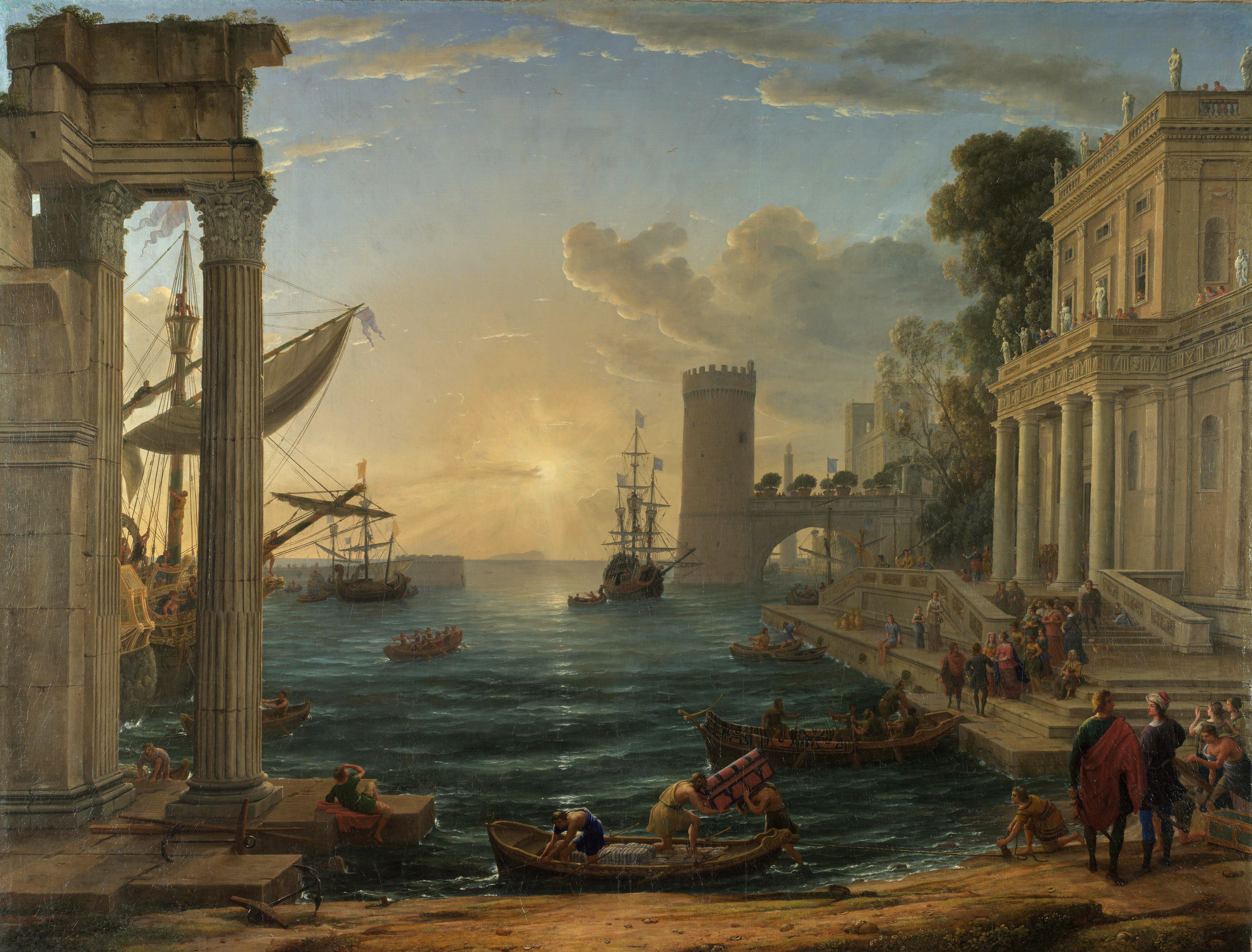
Claude Lorrain's The Embarkation of the Queen of Sheba. Regulus was compared by critics to the Lorrain's work.

Turner painted Regulus during his 1828 visit to Rome. He began work on about eight to ten paintings in total, but only four were completed: Regulus, View of Orvieto, Palestrina and Vision of Medea. Of these four, Regulus was probably the first to be finished. Turner stated that it was made to stop the "gabbling" of his peers interested in his activities. In late December 1828, Turner hosted a small exhibition in the Palazzo Trulli containing three of his finished paintings: Regulus, Orvieto, and Medea. Due to difficulties in sourcing frames for the paintings, they were displayed with yellow rope nailed around the edges of each canvas.

The exhibition received approximately 1,000 visitors, many of whom were French and German artists who disliked Turner's liberal application of paint. According to Charles Lock Eastlake, a friend of Turner who was present at the exhibition, the visitors were critical of the paintings, finding various defects and excessive resemblance to works by Claude Lorrain (known mononymously as Claude). One saying used by critics during the exhibition was the old Latin phrase "Caccatum non est pictum" ('It's shit; it's not painting!').

=== In England ===
In January 1829, Turner returned to London, opting to ship his paintings back separately, insured for 500 guineas. He hoped they would arrive early enough to be shown in the 1829 exhibition of the Royal Academy of Arts, but they only arrived on 20 July, three months after it opened. At some point before 1837, Regulus's canvas was severely damaged. While Turner stated in a letter to the artist William Linton that all of his paintings had arrived safely, it is possible that Regulus was damaged on the return trip, and Turner had not inspected it thoroughly enough to notice the tear. This theory is supported by the fact that Regulus was not shown for several years after its move to London, while the other Italian paintings such as Orvieto and Palestrina were exhibited soon after their arrival. It is also possible Regulus was damaged in London in any number of ways, such as falling onto furniture. The damage constituted a large tear in the upper left corner of the painting, which covered much of the sky. It was mended through stitching and a relining – possibly performed by William Redmore Bigg – where additional fabric was added to the back of the painting. A quarter of the canvas, containing mostly sky, was completely repainted to hide the damage. An additional tear is found running vertically just right of the painting's centre, directly in the middle of the sun. This tear was also stitched shut and hidden with paint.

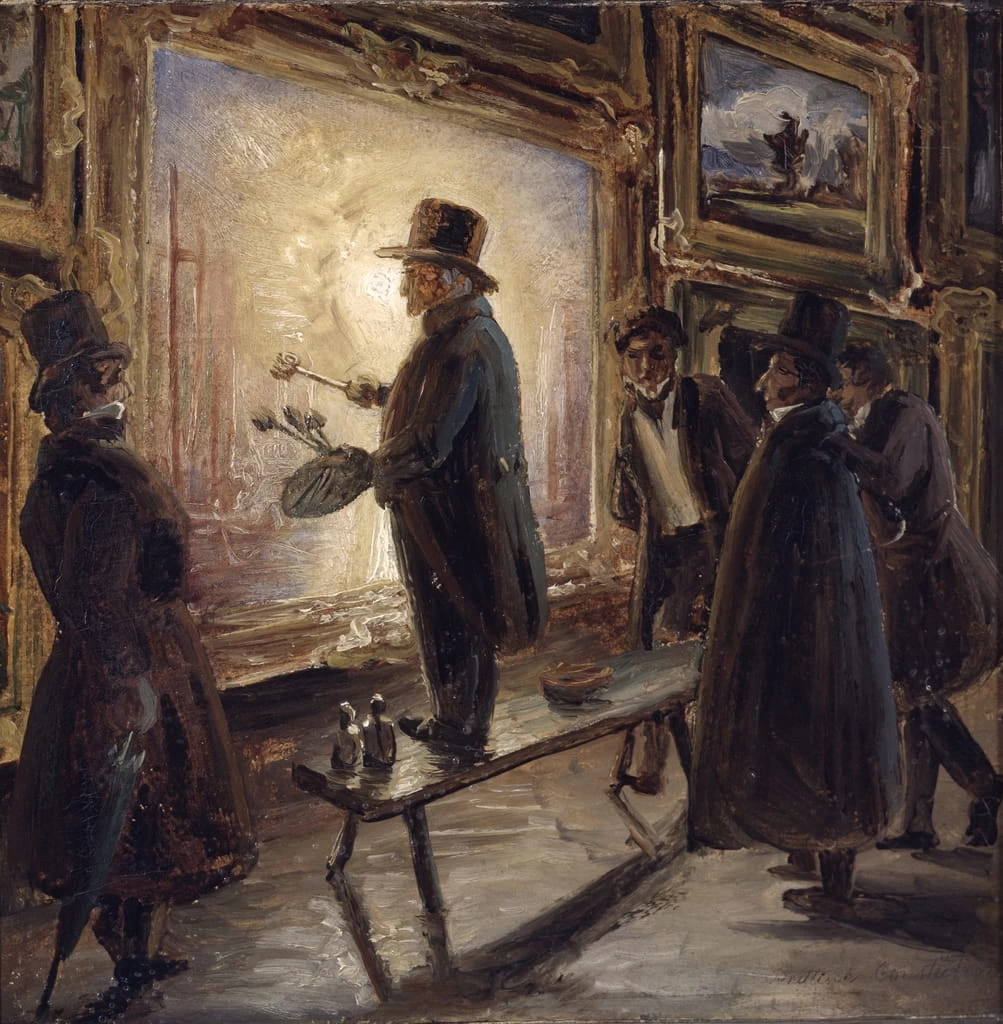
Fearnley's (left) and Cope's (right) depictions of Turner repainting Regulus during the 1837 varnishing day

On 28 January 1837, the British Institution hosted its annual varnishing day, an event where artists varnished and made final revisions to their paintings in front of private audiences before their exhibition opened. Turner had submitted Regulus for the exhibition, an unusual choice considering his view of the British Institution as a place to sell unwanted paintings, given the significant effort he had already dedicated to repairing the canvas. It is possible that he wanted to display the painting to demonstrate how the principles of Claude could be modernised. It is also likely that since the premises of the Royal Academy of Arts had been moved from Somerset House to Trafalgar Square, he hoped to use larger paintings there to attract more attention. Regulus, which was relatively small compared to the other paintings shown at the exhibition, would be unsuited for this goal.

During the varnishing day of 1839, Turner made significant modifications to Regulus. While he was known for often making these late changes to his paintings, the overpainting of Regulus is the only case where we have both written and visual descriptions. The English artist John Gilbert observed the event, which he described 45 years later in a letter to George Scharf, the director of the National Portrait Gallery. The letter was then published by Scharf's successor, Lionel Cust, in the 1895 edition of The Magazine of Art. Gilbert claimed that Turner used several large hog bristle brushes to drive flake-white paint into the centre of the canvas in order to create a misty effect, following ruled lines he had drawn to mark the rays of the sun. He also notes that, at an angle, the sun seemed to bulge out due to the amount of paint which had been added to the area. Analysis performed in 2012 has called many of these details into question. No material evidence can be found that guiding lines were drawn for the rays, and the amount of material around the sun was insufficient to have ever produced a protruding effect. The flake-white paint Gilbert described was probably megilp, which would have produced the dramatic change in atmosphere that he observed.

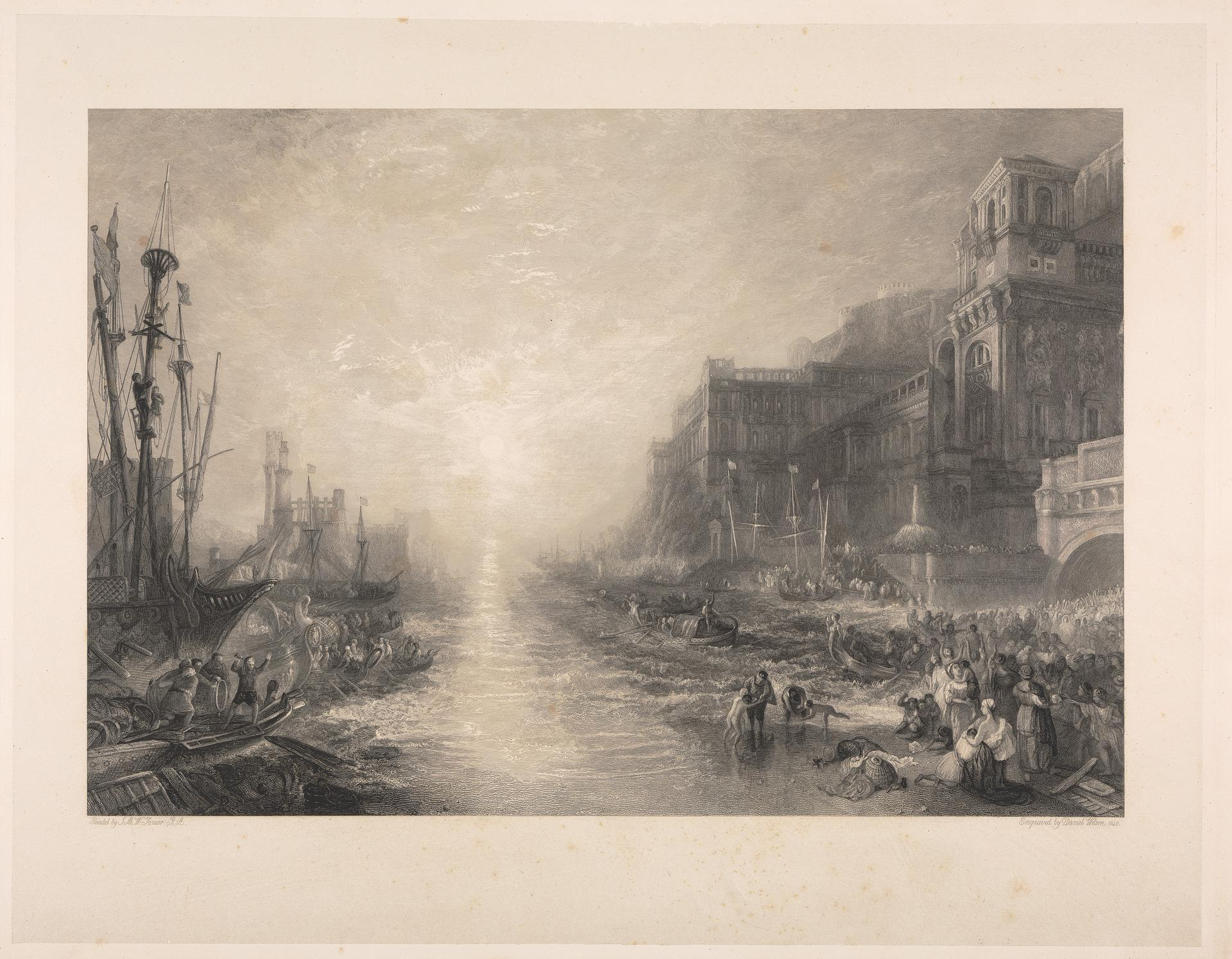
Ancient Carthage – the Embarcation of Regulus (1840), Daniel Wilson

Two other surviving depictions of the event exist in paintings created during the varnishing day. The Norwegian artist Thomas Fearnley and the English artist Charles West Cope both created paintings of the repainting, possibly as a lighthearted competition. The paintings depict Turner standing on a bench to paint, surrounded by materials and holding a fistful of brushes, while emphasising the brightness of Regulus compared to the surrounding scene. In Fearnley's painting, Regulus literally serves as a light source which casts shadows through the painting.

Several years later, (Note: Finley states the engraving was created in 1840, while Beaumont places the date at 1838.) the Scottish artist Daniel Wilson was tasked with engraving Regulus after being invited to Turner's house and shown to the "Inaccessible gallery" where the painting was held. The task was difficult for the novice engraver, given the amount and intensity of light in the scene. The copper plate used was just under half the size of the canvas, and had a slightly different aspect ratio from the original painting. To remedy this, Wilson omitted the immediate top and bottom of the painting, and extended the scene by adding additional masts on the left side.

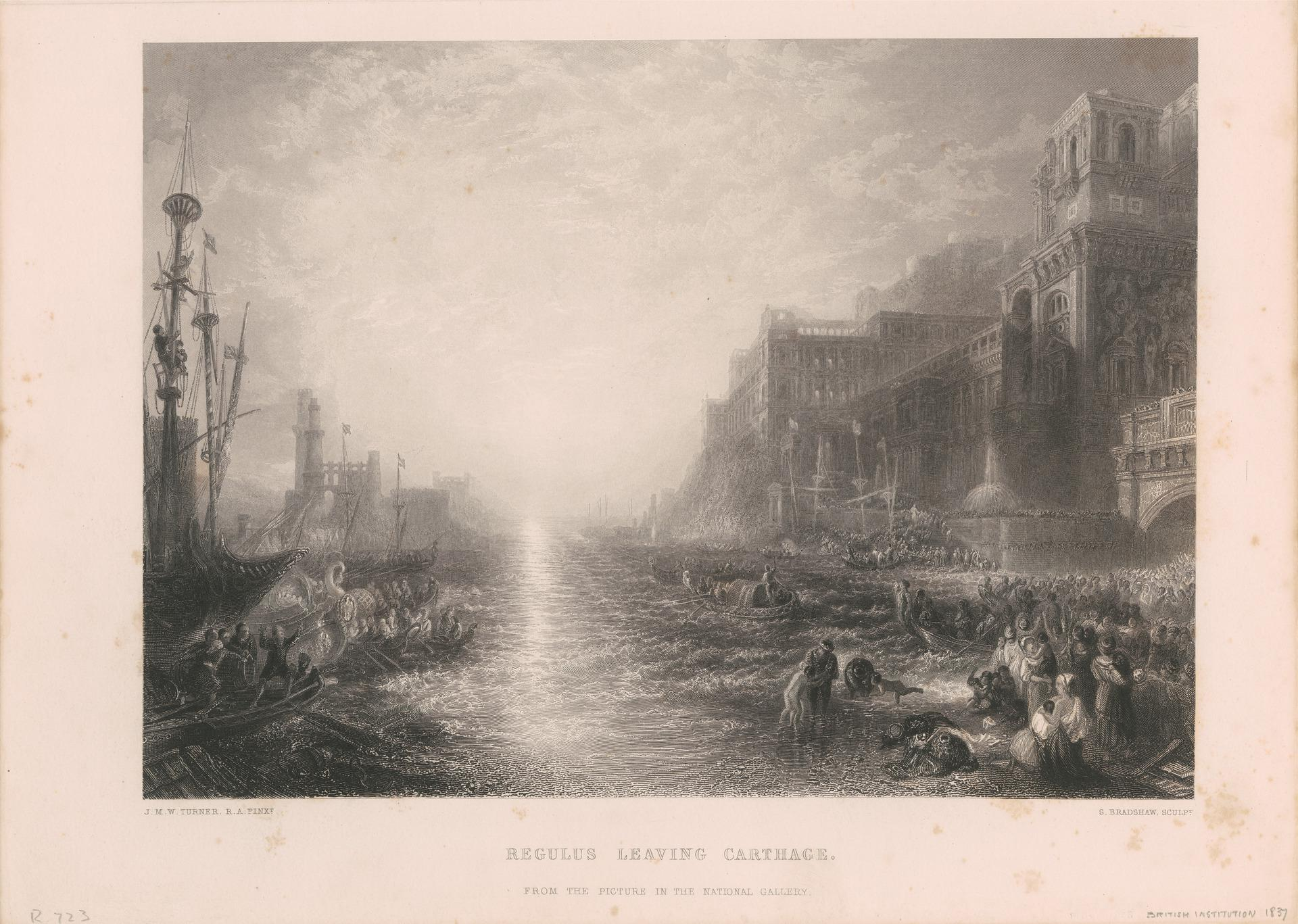
Regulus leaving Carthage (c. 1860s), Samuel Bradshaw

Regulus remained in Turner's personal gallery until his death in 1851. The repaintings and repairs made it particularly susceptible to the poor environmental conditions of the gallery, which included dust, roaming cats, and moisture. In 1856, the legal proceedings of the Turner Bequest were settled, and Regulus became one of the first 100 paintings moved to the National Gallery in London. On 24 November 1856, it was moved to the ground floor of Marlborough House, then used as an overflow space, and six months later was relocated upstairs. In October 1859, the Keeper of the National Gallery Ralph Nicholson Wornum moved Regulus to the South Kensington Museum, where a small engraving was made by Samuel Bradshaw. (Note: The copper plate Bradshaw engraved on was approximately a quarter the size of Wilson's plate, which itself was half the size of the original canvas.) In October 1861, Regulus was moved to the Turner Room in the National Gallery to comply with the terms of the Turner Bequest.

=== Stabbing and other damage ===
Just before 2:00 pm, on 16 December 1863, Walter Stephenson entered the Turner Room of the National Gallery. Stephenson may have worked as an accountant, an author, a clerk or a lithographic writer; he was known to be homeless and without family or friends. The curator Edmund Paine noticed that Stephenson was acting erratically around Regulus, and reported him to Eleazer Dennin, the inspector of police for the National Gallery. Stephenson realised he was being watched and stayed still for two hours. Paine reentered the gallery shortly before 4:00 pm, after which Stephenson produced a penknife and stabbed the painting nine times, piercing the canvas four times and creating a gash about 32 millimetres (1.25 in) long. Stephenson was apprehended on the spot, and willingly handed over his knife with paint still on the blade. Stephenson seems to have been in part motivated by a hostility towards Turner, as Dennin claimed that he said during interrogation, "I was very much excited. The misty state of the picture and the dislike I had for the man made me do it."

Stephenson was taken into custody and charged with "wilful damage to one of Turner's pictures in the National Gallery". He was tried on 4 January 1864, in Clerkenwell, where he pleaded guilty. On 18 January, he was sentenced to six months of hard labour. The painting restorer George Morrill was hired on 28 January to reline Regulus, a task which he completed by 9 February. On 19 February, Charles Buttery was hired to make further repairs to the painting for eight guineas. He completed this work quickly, and by 1 April, only four months after the attack, Regulus was returned to the National Gallery.

Since 1960, Regulus has had to be retouched four times due to flaking and cracking paint. In 1984, a visitor poked the centre of Regulus's canvas, causing several flakes of paint to fall off. They were retrieved from the floor and reattached.

=== At Tate Britain ===
Regulus was transferred to the National Gallery of British Art, now Tate Britain, in 1929, where it remains as part of the display "JMW Turner: Travels in Europe". Since the transfer, Regulus has been exhibited at several other galleries, including on a tour by the Arts Council of Great Britain, and at the Royal Academy of Arts. In 2017, it was exhibited at the Frick Collection in New York City as part of the show "Turner's Modern and Ancient Ports: Passages through Time".

== Reception and criticism ==
Regulus was extremely controversial during Turner's life, drawing significant criticism during its exhibitions. Nevertheless, the painting had its supporters. Charles Lock Eastlake described the work as "more Italian than Italy itself", and the writer Herman Melville bought an engraving of Bradshaw's Regulus Leaving Carthage that had first been published in the 1859 collection The Turner Gallery. During the painting's 1837 exhibition, a writer for The Spectator compared it to the works of Claude and commented on the intensity of the sun, stating that "it is with Turner's gorgeous effects—we wish the sun were out of the picture". Modern commentators have focused on the minor position of Regulus in the painting compared to the sun. The art critic Karen Rosenberg stated that the sun "upstages" Regulus, and the academic Peter Conrad said that the location of Regulus "doesn’t matter", as the focus of the painting is instead the sunlight.

John Ruskin, one of Turner's most prominent supporters, despised Regulus. He considered it a "wicked relapse into the old rivalry with Claude", believing it both imitated and challenged the works of Claude. He proposed that the painting be displayed in a condemned cell as an object of mockery and an example of Turner's sins. This intense dislike for Regulus persisted for Ruskin's entire life, as he frequently commented on its flaws in various letters, notes, and books.

== Analysis ==
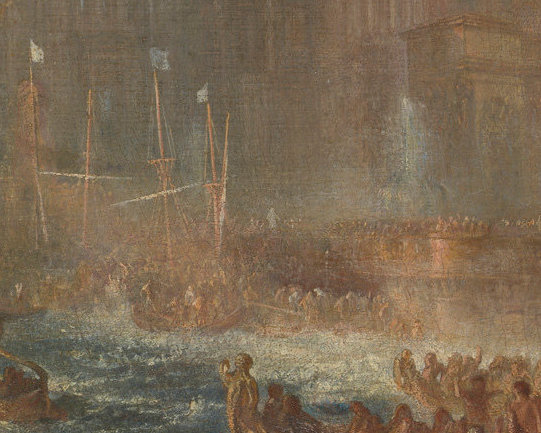
Detail of the figure thought to be Regulus (centre)

Several key elements of the painting, including the setting and figures, have been subject to debate. During the trial of the vandal Walter Stephenson, the painting was referred to by court officials and curators as Regulus Leaving Rome, implying the setting to be Rome. This is supported by the fact that Turner's main source on Regulus, Oliver Goldsmith's Roman History, focuses on Regulus's final departure from Rome. However, the titles of Wilson's and Bradshaw's engravings, the latter overseen by Turner himself, seem to imply that the scene takes place in Carthage, before Regulus leaves for Rome.

The location of Regulus himself has been subject to multiple interpretations. Regulus is sometimes identified as a small white figure to the right descending a staircase, though the extremely small size of the figure has left many commentators unable to identify the subject. The Turner scholar John Gage suggested that Regulus was not literally in the painting; instead, according to Gage, the painting shows Regulus's perspective as he was being blinded. This is supported by Turner's tendency to place the spectator as the protagonist in his other artwork of the sublime. However, this analysis is disputed. The art historian Andrew Wilton believed this framing would have been extremely unorthodox for the time, and notes that the literal titles of the engravings imply that Turner intended a more traditional perspective. The literary scholar Matthew Beaumont proposed a third possibility for both the painting's setting and location of Regulus. He argued that the geographic and temporal vagueness of Regulus implies the painting does not depict a single moment but rather represents Regulus's entire life, Turner consciously painting it to be of both views simultaneously.

=== Artistic influences ===
Regulus may have been influenced by several other paintings, and may have been drawn on in Turner's later work. During an 1820 trip, Turner studied and sketched Claude's Seaport with the Villa Medici while working in Florence's Uffizi Gallery. The two paintings have very similar qualities, both mixing ships and buildings around a port. Turner may have also drawn on Dido Directing the Equipment of the Fleet, one of his own earlier landscapes set in the ancient Mediterranean. A similar theory by J. Hillis Miller proposed that the oil sketch Claudian Harbour Scene, commonly believed to be a preliminary sketch for Dido Directing the Equipment of the Fleet, may actually have been preparation for Regulus. He speculated that the hooded figure in Claudian Harbour Scene may be Regulus. The art historian Gerald Finley compared Regulus to Turner's 1833 painting Fontainebleau, which depicts Napoleon Bonaparte standing atop a staircase set far back in the painting. This closely resembles the figure of Regulus in the traditional understanding of Regulus's perspective. This is supported by Turner's outlook on the two subjects, as he understood both men to be "tragic heroes".

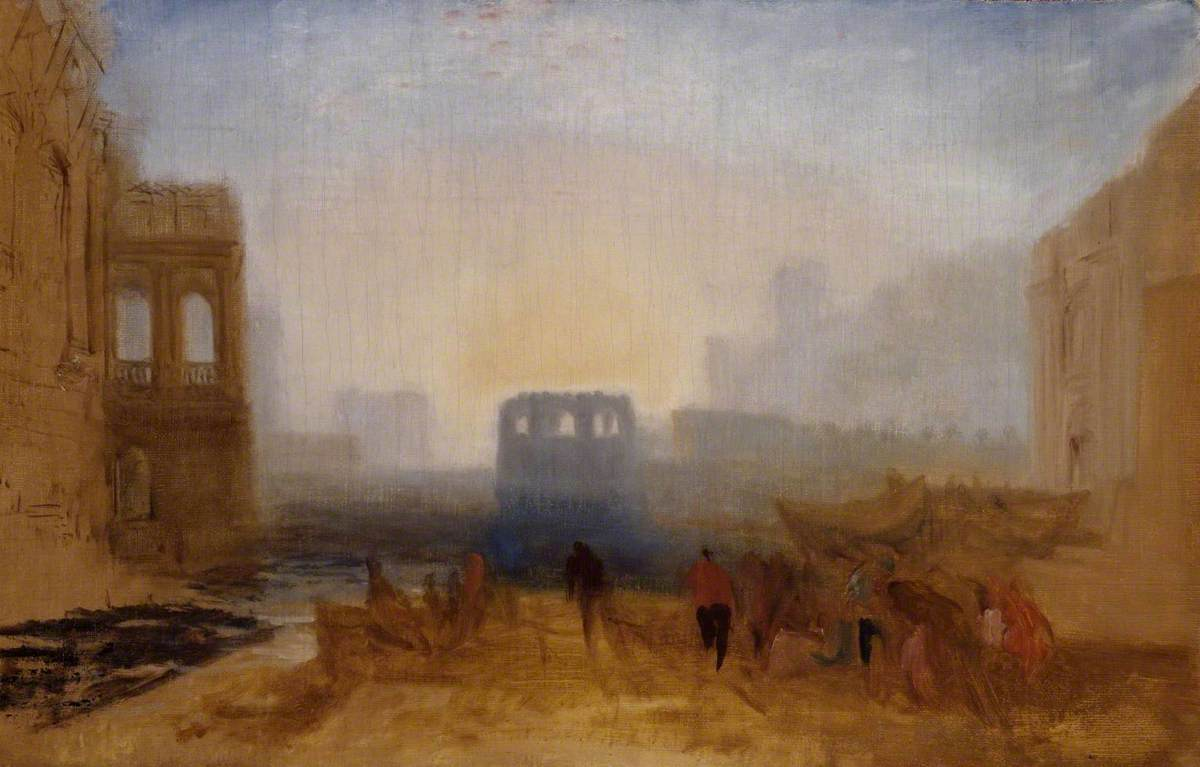
Claudian Harbour Scene (c. 1827–1828), J. M. W. Turner

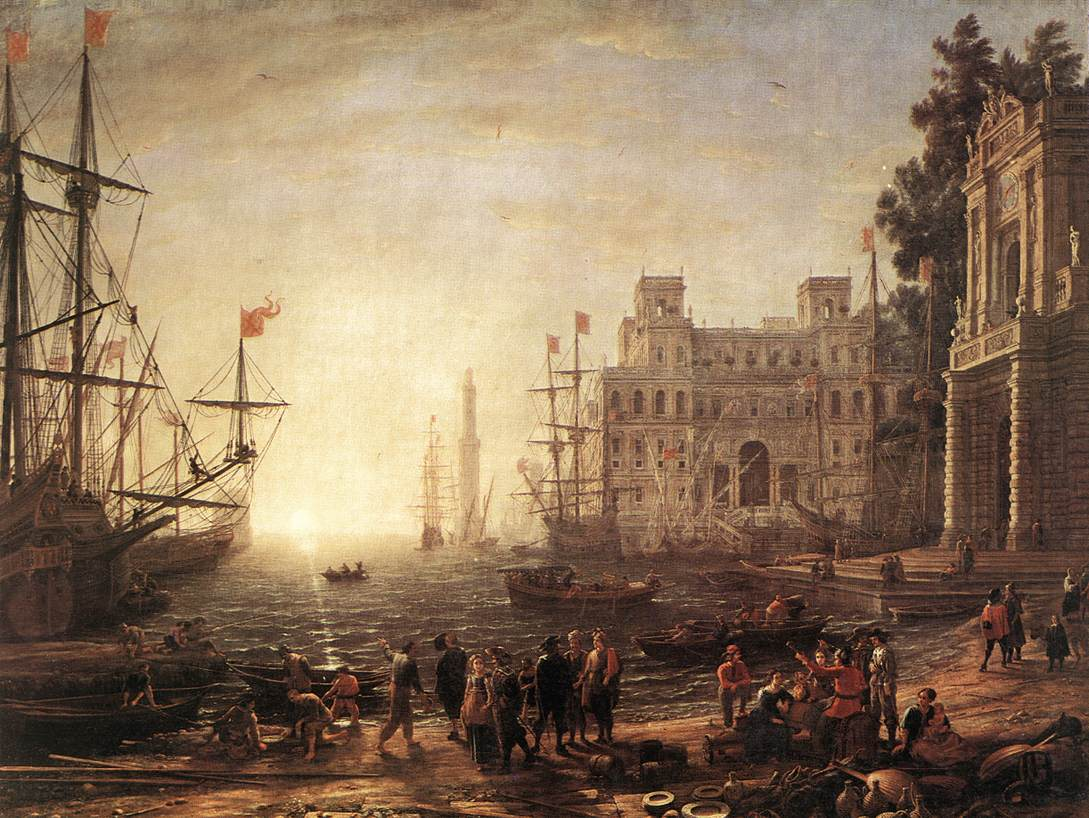
Seaport with the Villa Medici (1637), Claude Lorrain

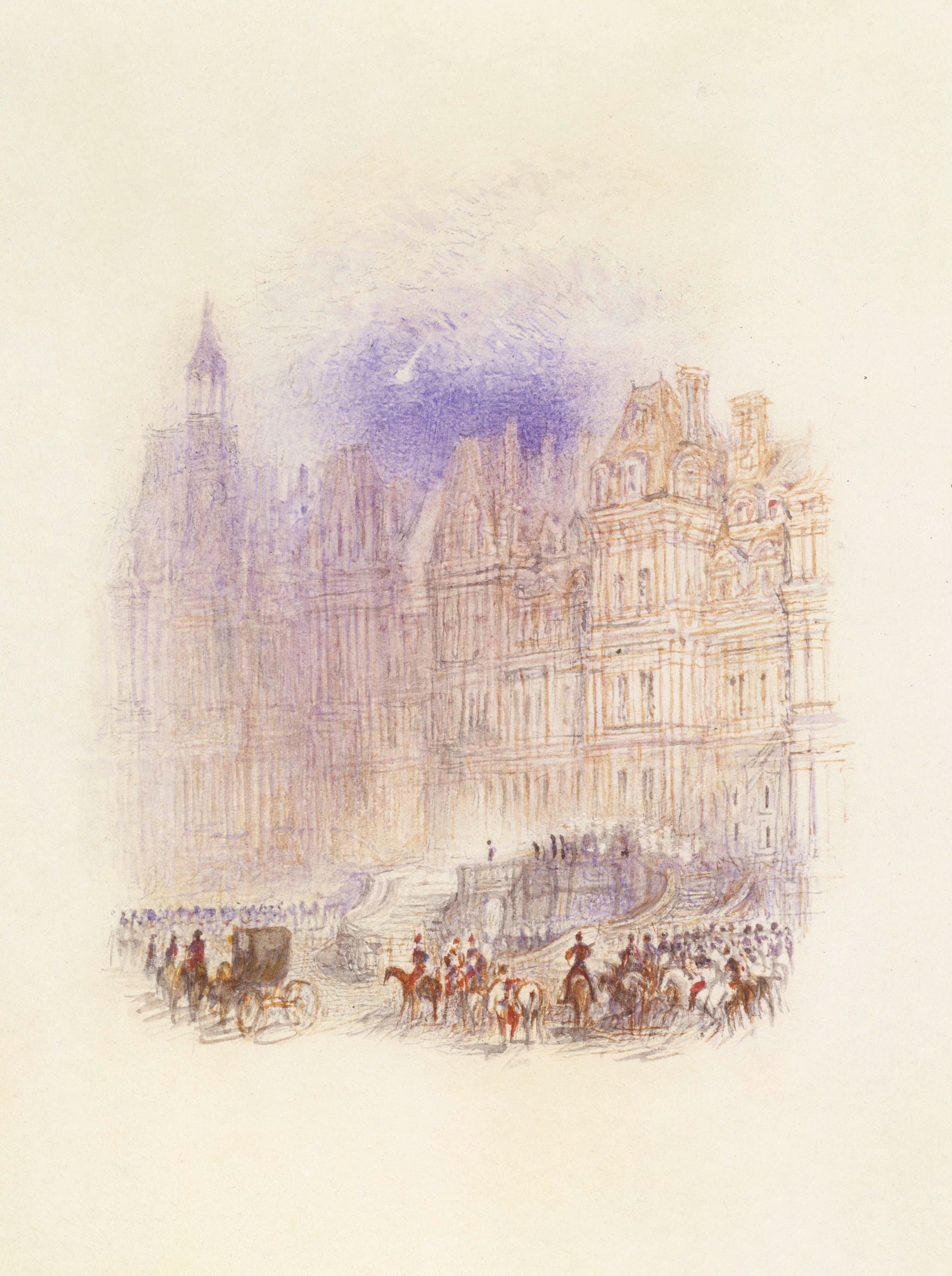
Fontainebleau (1833), J. M. W. Turner

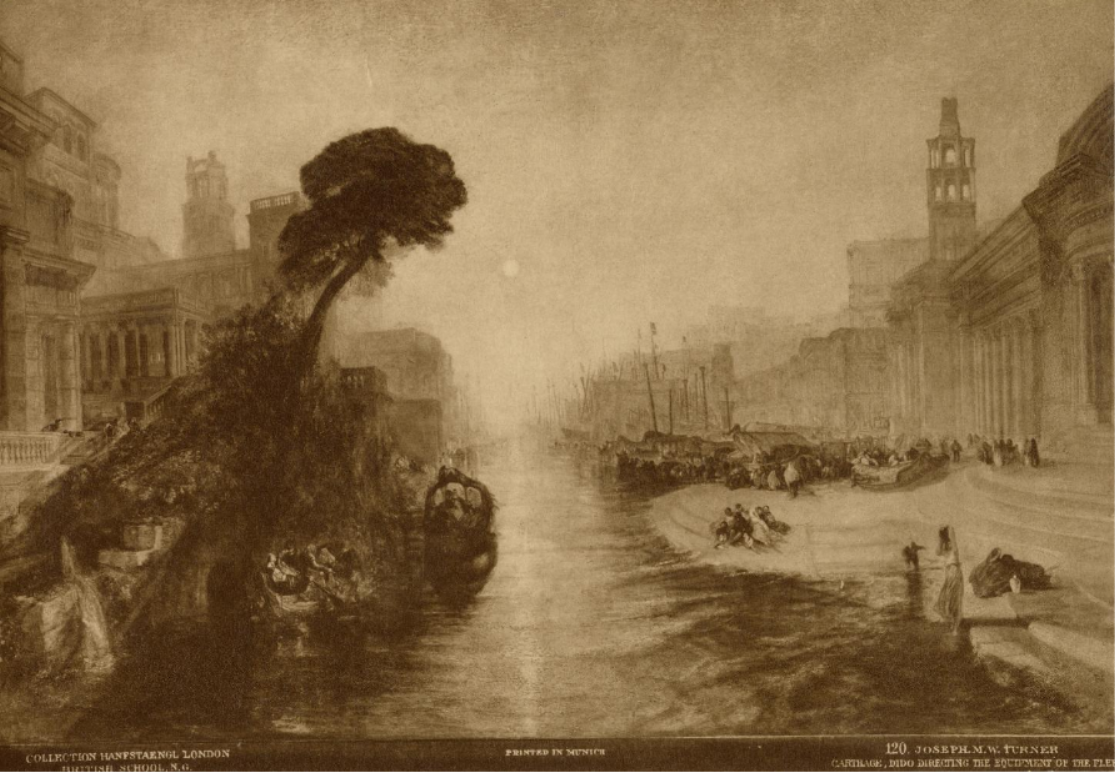
Dido Directing the Equipment of the Fleet (1828), J. M. W. Turner
