= The Oath of Hannibal =

Painting by Benjamin West

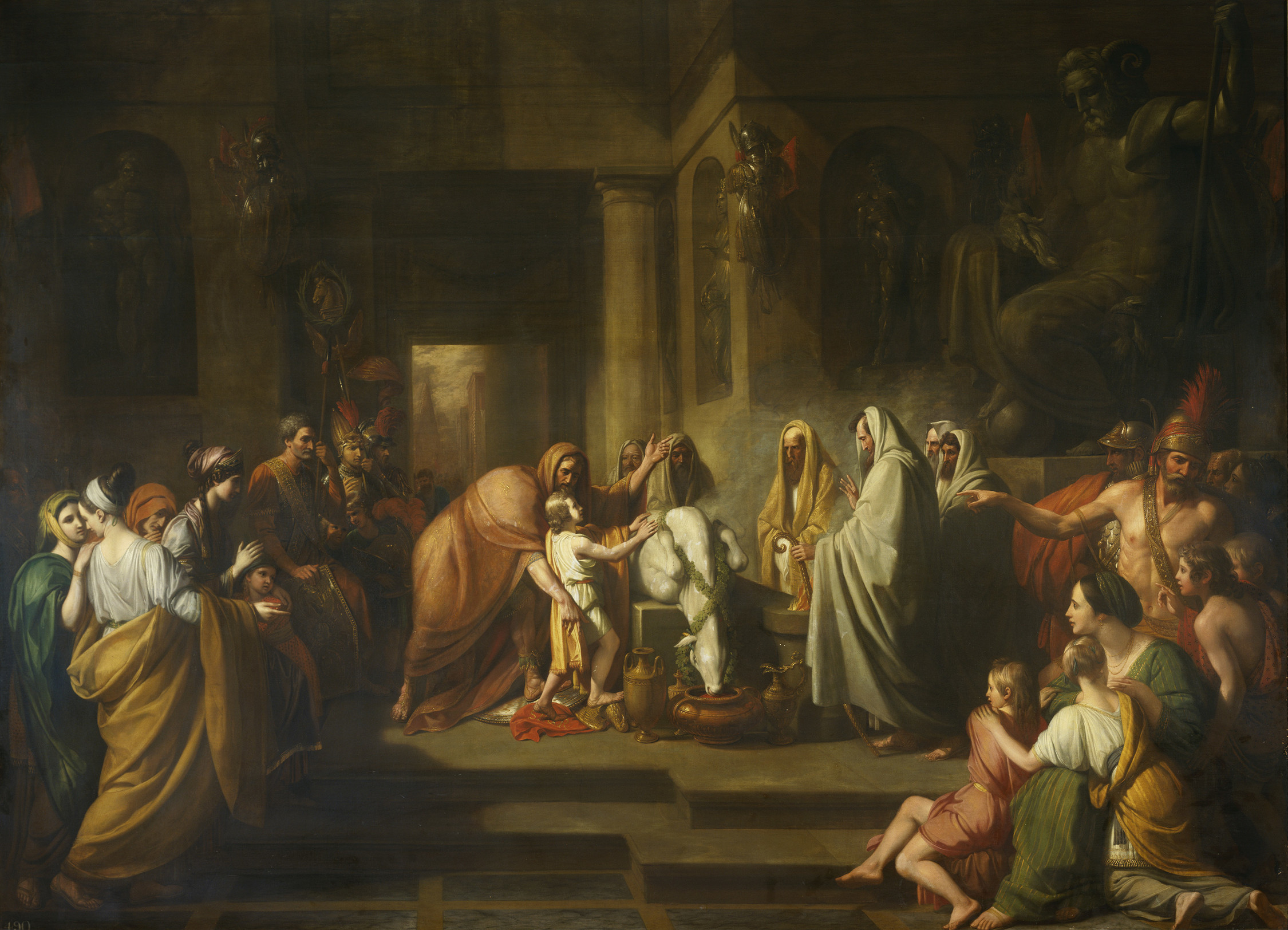
- Artist: Benjamin West
- Year: 1770
- Type: Oil on canvas, history painting
- Dimensions: 224.9 cm × 307.7 cm (88.5 in × 121.1 in)
- Location: Royal Collection; London

The Oath of Hannibal is a 1770 history painting by the Anglo-American artist Benjamin West. It depicts the moment when the nine-year-old Hannibal is taken to a temple by his father Hamilcar Barca to swear an oath of eternal enmity to the Roman Republic.

West, later President of the Royal Academy, was known for history paintings featuring classical scenes as well as more modern works such as The Death of General Wolfe.

This and a companion piece The Departure of Regulus, also featuring a scene from the Punic Wars, were commissioned by George III to hang in Buckingham Palace. Painted at a cost of 400 guineas, it was exhibited at the Royal Academy Exhibition of 1771 in Pall Mall. Along with his depictions of James Wolfe, it was one of the hits of the exhibition and led to further commissions from the king.

== Bibliography ==
- Grossman, Lloyd. Benjamin West and the Struggle to be Modern. Merrell Publishers, 2015.
- Staiti, Paul. Of Arms and Artists: The American Revolution through Painters' Eyes. Bloomsbury Publishing USA, 2016.
