= The Departure of Regulus =

Painting by Benjamin West

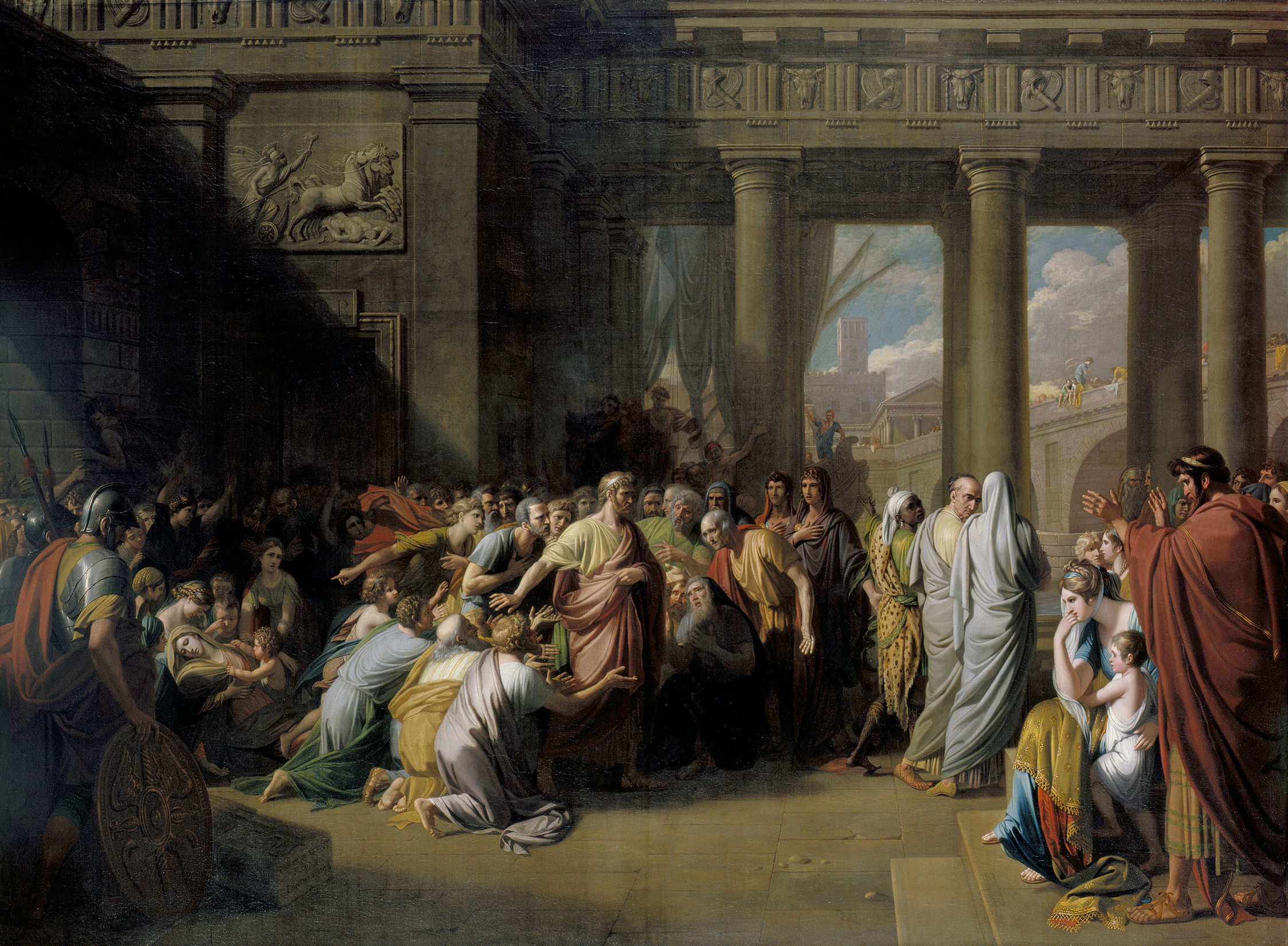
- Artist: Benjamin West
- Year: 1769
- Medium: Oil on canvas
- Dimensions: 225.4 cm × 307.2 cm (88.7 in × 120.9 in)
- Location: Royal Collection; London
- Accession: RCIN 405416
- Website: www.rct.uk/collection/405416/the-departure-of-regulus

The Departure of Regulus is 1769 history painting by the Anglo-American artist Benjamin West. It was one of a number of classical scenes painted by West alongside his better-known depictions of more recent history.

The scene depicts the departure from Rome of Regulus a consul and general of the Roman Republic. Taken prisoner by Carthage during the First Punic War he was released on parole during the negotiations for peace. Realising that Rome intended to violate the peace terms, he chose as a matter of honour to return to Carthage to face a certain, violent death. Regulus and his stoic acceptance of his fate was a popular theme in eighteenth century Britain. The composition was likely influenced by the Raphael Cartoons which West admired.

West arrived in England in 1763 and enjoyed success for his historical scenes. The painting was commissioned by George III who became a regular patron of West. Another work commissioned by the King at the same time The Oath of Hannibal shares a similar theme of the Carthaginian Wars. Both works remain in the Royal Collection.

It was depicted at the Royal Academy's 1769 Summer Exhibition, the first ever exhibition of the academy. The following year West produced his best-known work The Death of General Wolfe. In 1792 he became President of the Royal Academy.

== Bibliography ==
- Goodwin, Elliot H. The New Cambridge Modern History: Volume 8, The American and French Revolutions, 1763–93. CUP Archive, 1965.
- Hoock, Holger. The King's Artists : The Royal Academy of Arts and the Politics of British Culture 1760–1840: The Royal Academy of Arts and the Politics of British Culture 1760–1840. Clarendon Press, 2003.
- Staiti, Paul. Of Arms and Artists: The American Revolution through Painters' Eyes. Bloomsbury Publishing USA, 2016.
