= Royal Academy Exhibition of 1771 =

1771 art exhibition in London

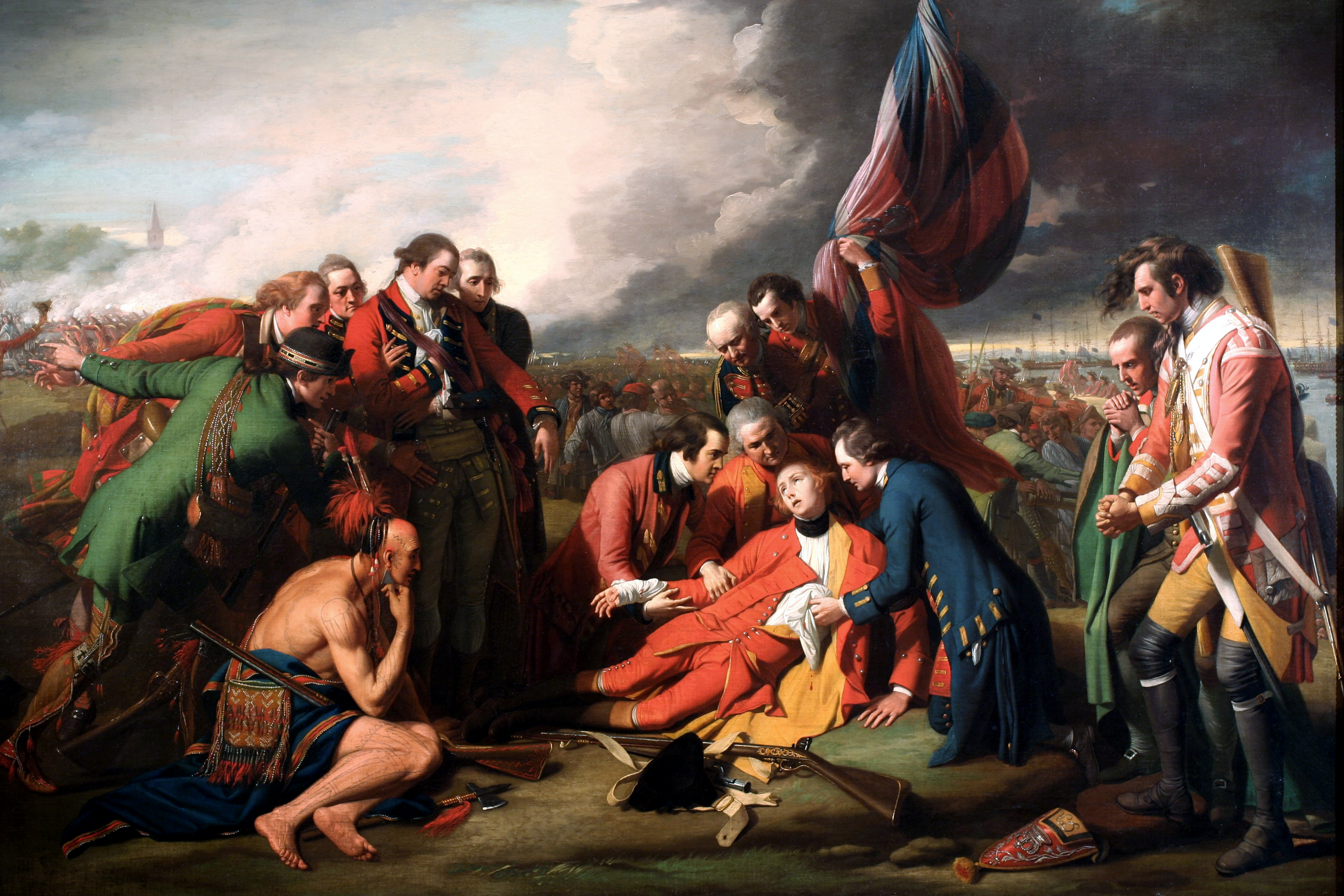
The Death of General Wolfe by Benjamin West

The Royal Academy Exhibition of 1771 was an art exhibition staged at Pall Mall between 24 April and 28 May 1771. It was the third annual exhibition to be organised by the Royal Academy of Arts. The exhibition attracted more than twenty thousand visitors and featured 276 works from painting, sculpture, architecture and prints. Today it is best remembered for Benjamin West's history painting The Death of General Wolfe.

== Exhibition ==
Joshua Reynolds, President of the Royal Academy submitted his usual portraits as well as a couple of history paintings. Nathaniel Dance exhibited David Garrick as Richard III at Bosworth, a portrait of the celebrated actor in one of his Shakespearian roles. The German-born artist Johann Zoffany exhibited his Portrait of George III. Thomas Gainsborough featured two landscapes along with several portraits, the latter including full-length pictures of Lord Ligonier and his wife as well as William Wade, the Master of Ceremonies at the fashionable Assembly Rooms in Bath where he was at that time based.

Benjamin West submitted nine works including The Death of General Wolfe, a modern history painting depicting the death in battle of James Wolfe during the taking of Quebec in 1759. Another neoclassical history painting The Oath of Hannibal featuring a scene from the Punic Wars also received acclaim. Angelica Kauffman showed several neoclassical history paintings including Interview of Edgar and Elfrida drawn from British history. The painter Richard Wilson submitted three landscape paintings two of which View near Wynnstay and Dinas Bran from Llangollen portrayed scenes in his native Wales and a third depicting Houghton House in Bedfordshire. William Pars exhibited eight watercolours he had produced after accompanying Viscount Palmerston on a Grand Tour.

The exhibition is portrayed in a mezzotint by Richard Earlom based on a watercolour by Michel Vincent Brandoin It was followed by the Royal Academy Exhibition of 1772. The rival Society of Artists of Great Britain, from which the Royal Academy had split in 1768, held their own exhibition at Spring Gardens from 26 April to 8 June 1771.

== Gallery ==
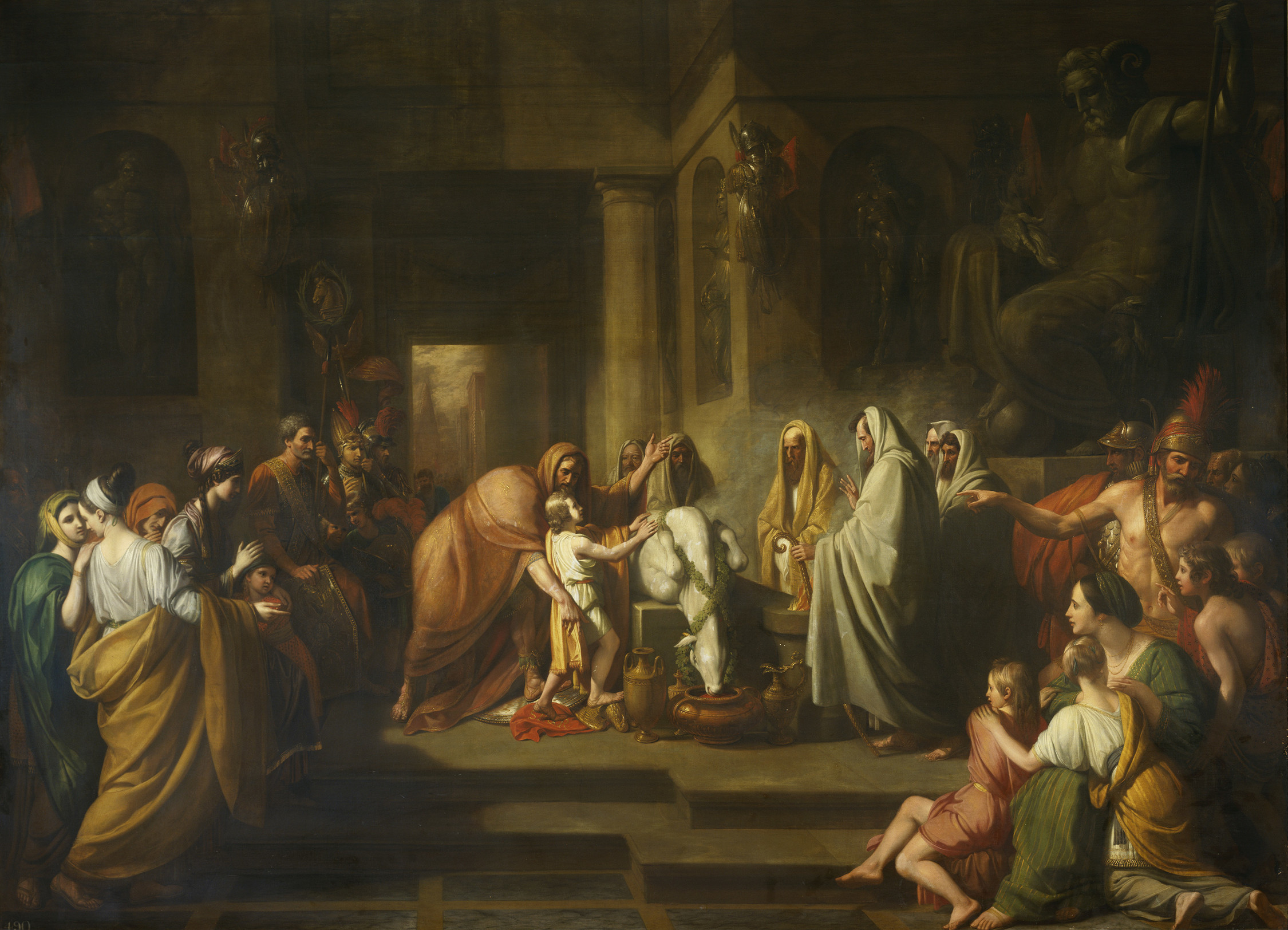
The Oath of Hannibal by Benjamin West

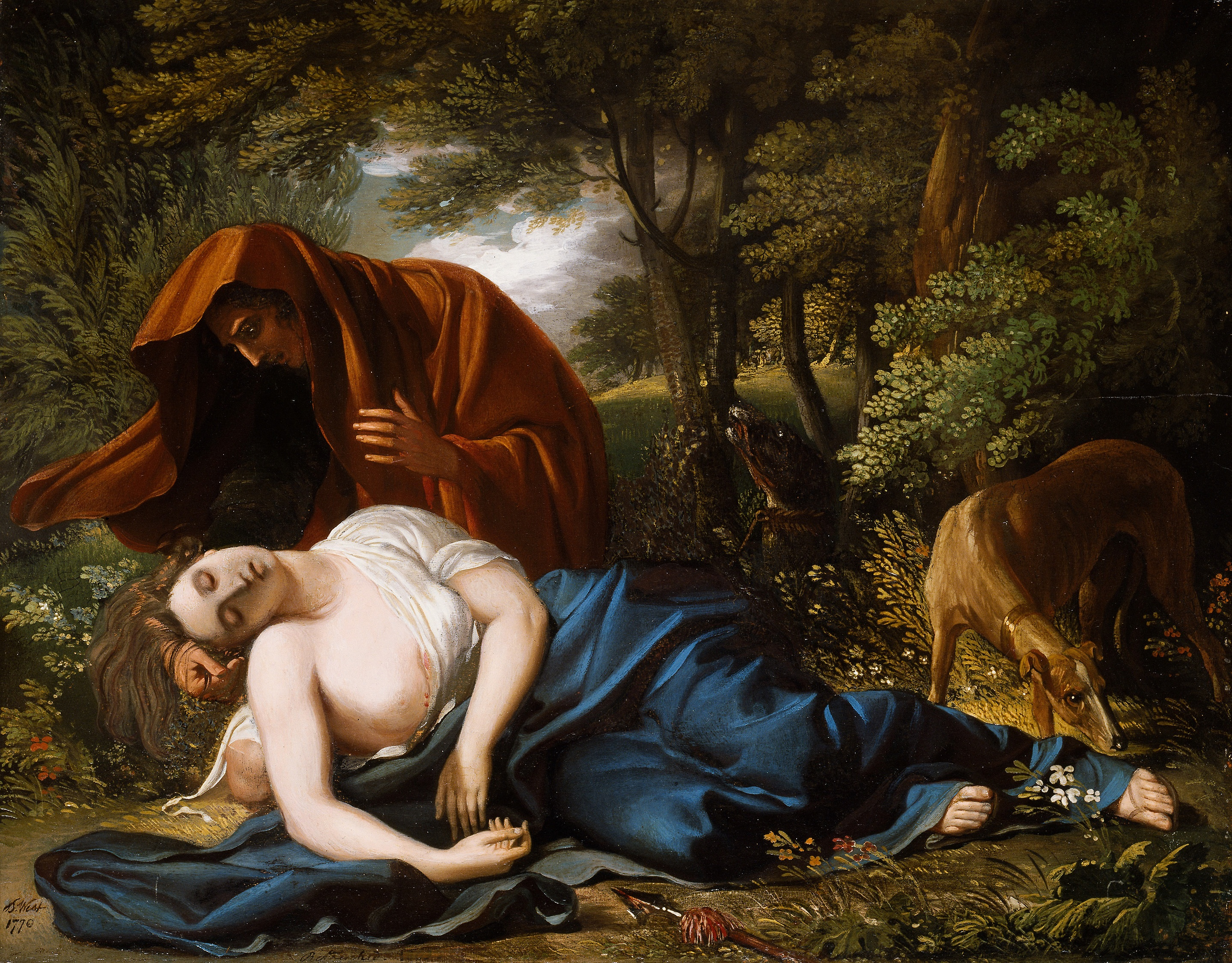
The Death of Procris by Benjamin West

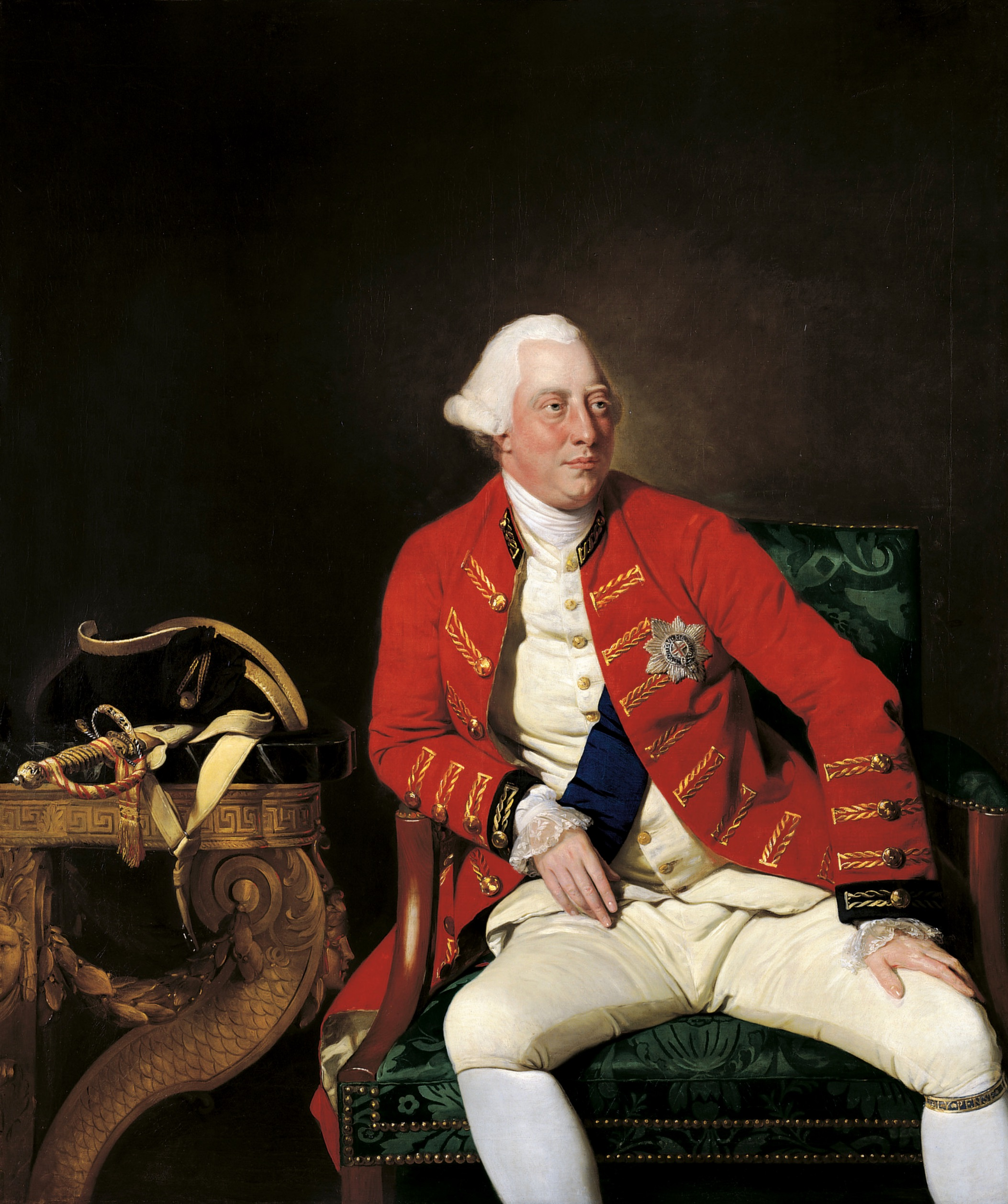
Portrait of George III by Johann Zoffany

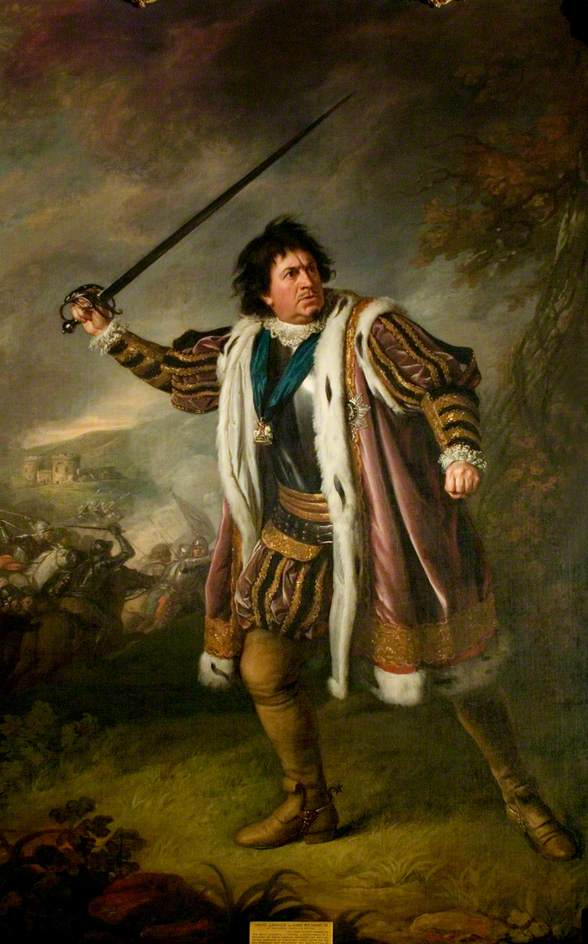
David Garrick as Richard III at Bosworth by Nathaniel Dance

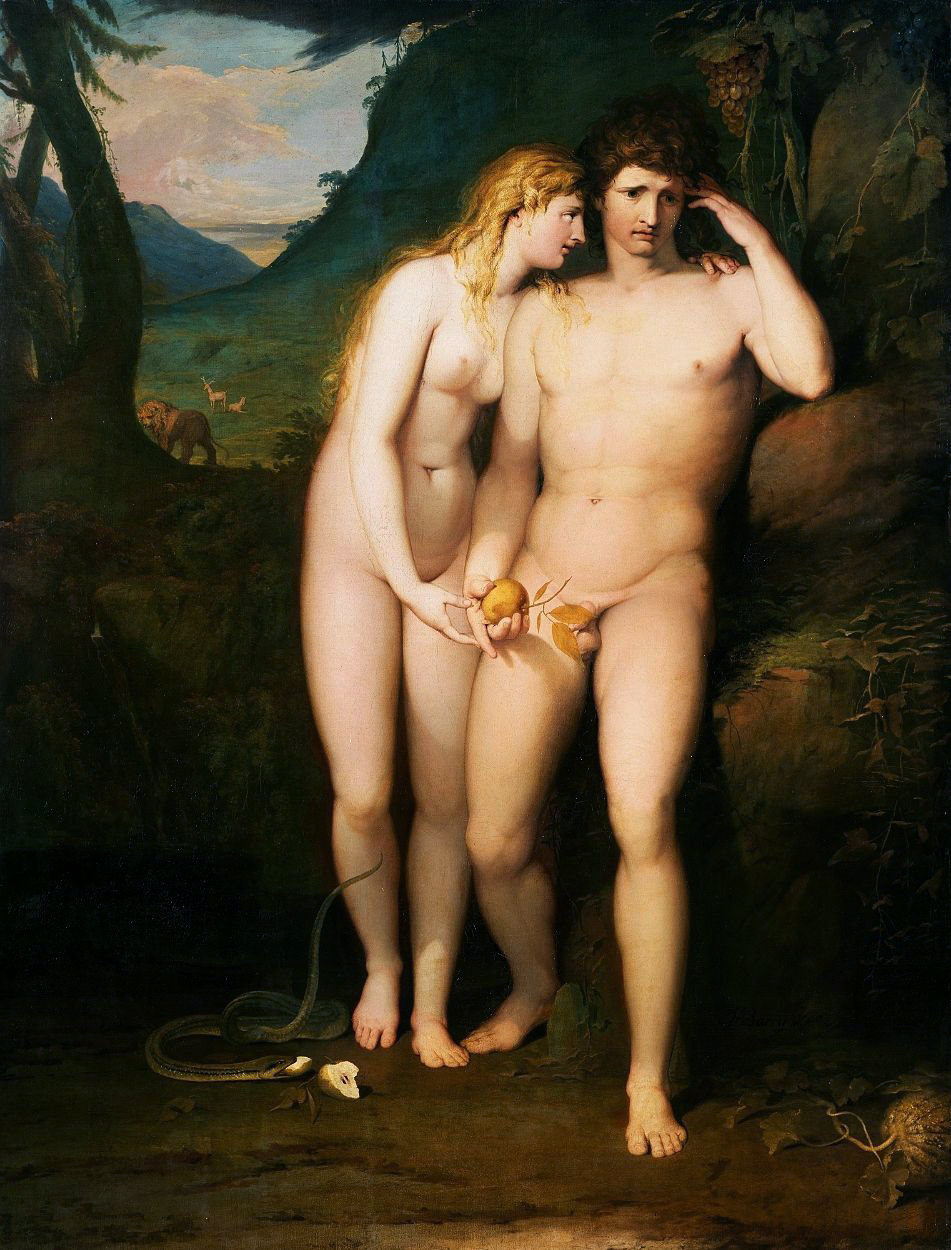
The Temptation of Adam by Eve by James Barry

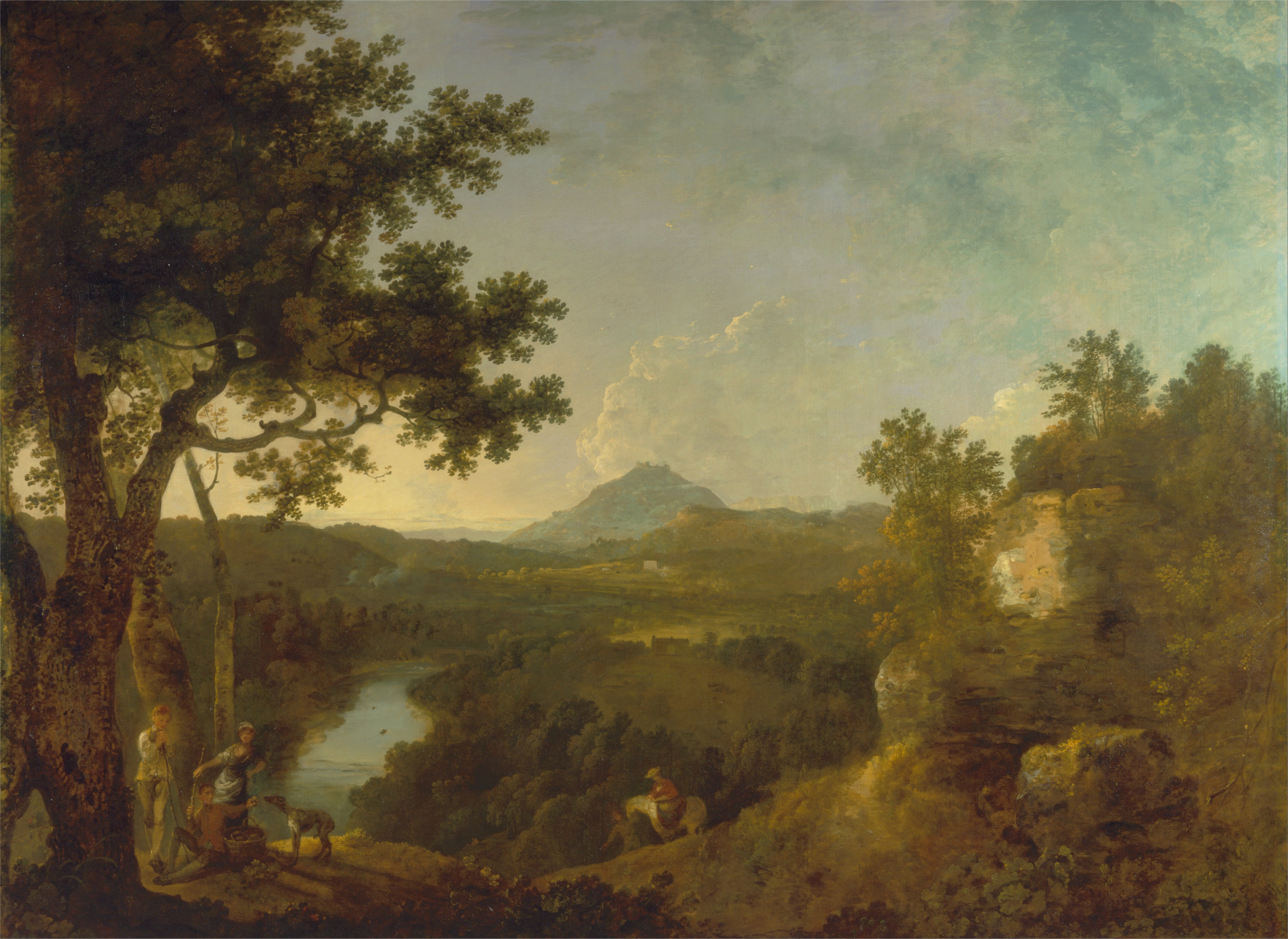
View near Wynnstay by Richard Wilson

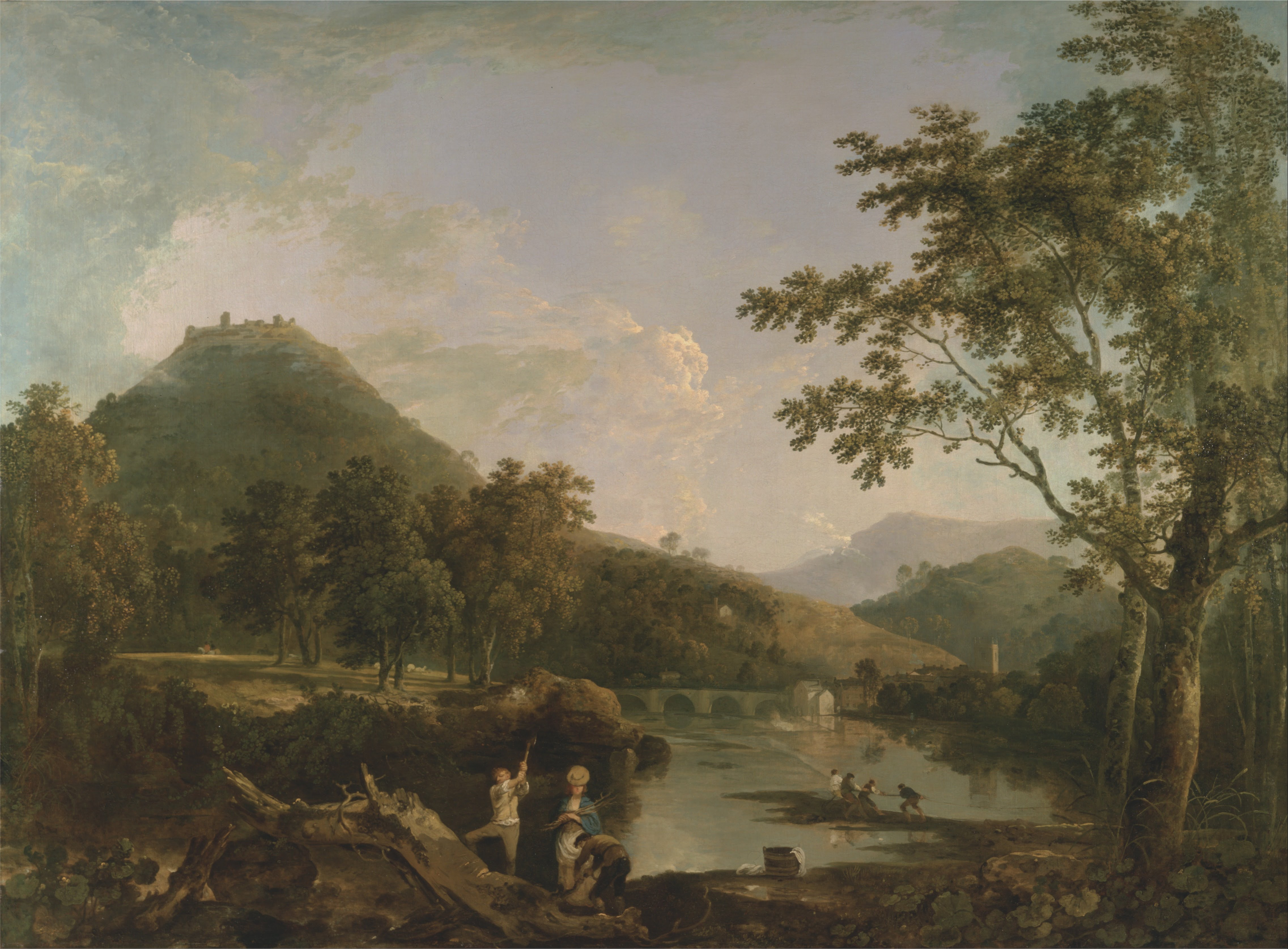
Dinas Bran from Llangollen by Richard Wilson

View of Houghton by Richard Wilson

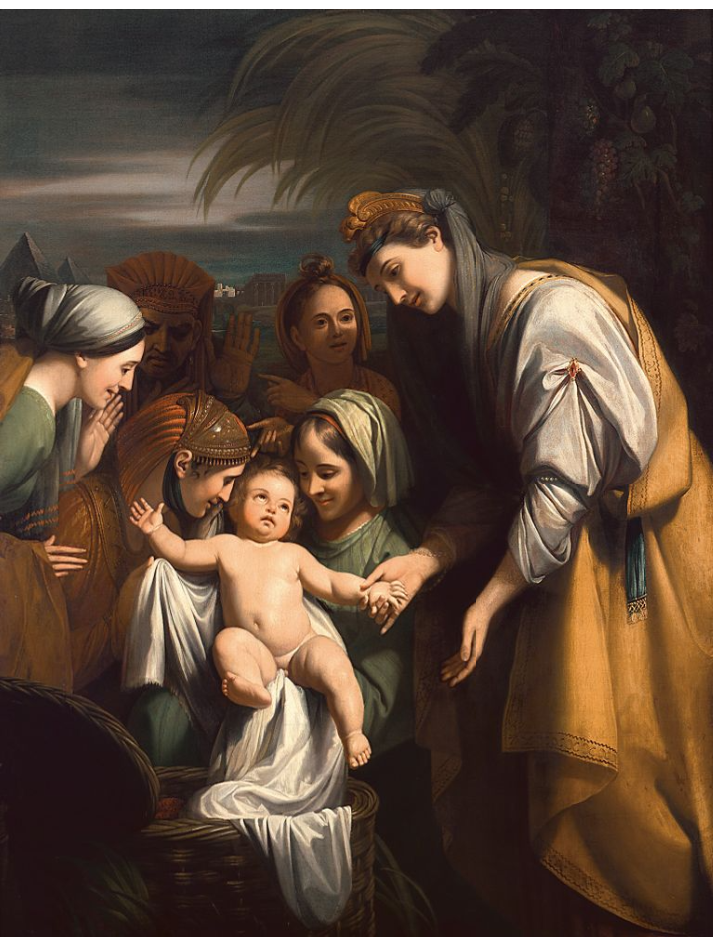
The Compassion of Pharaoh's Daughter for the Infant Moses by Benjamin West

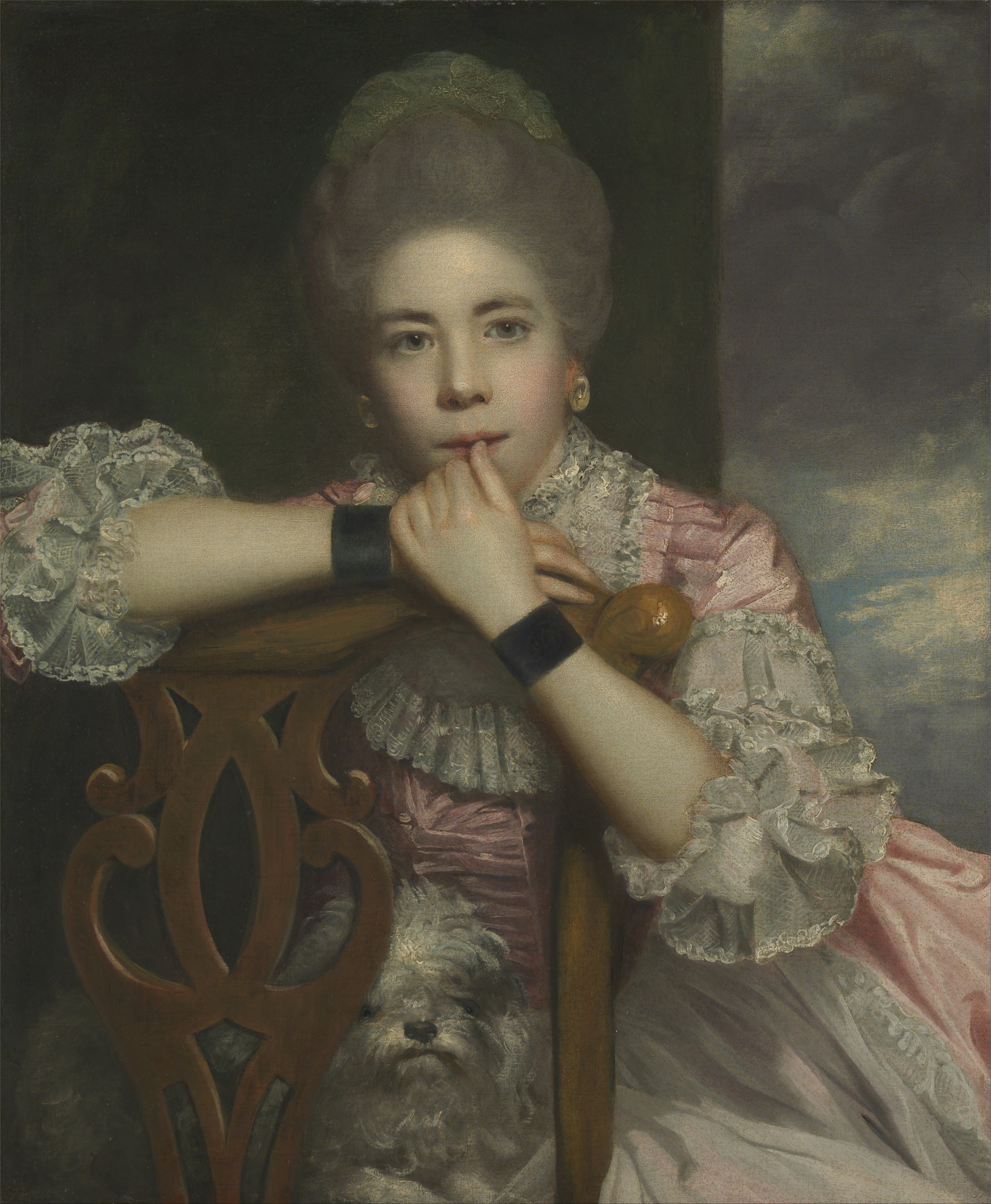
Frances Abington in Love for Love by Joshua Reynolds

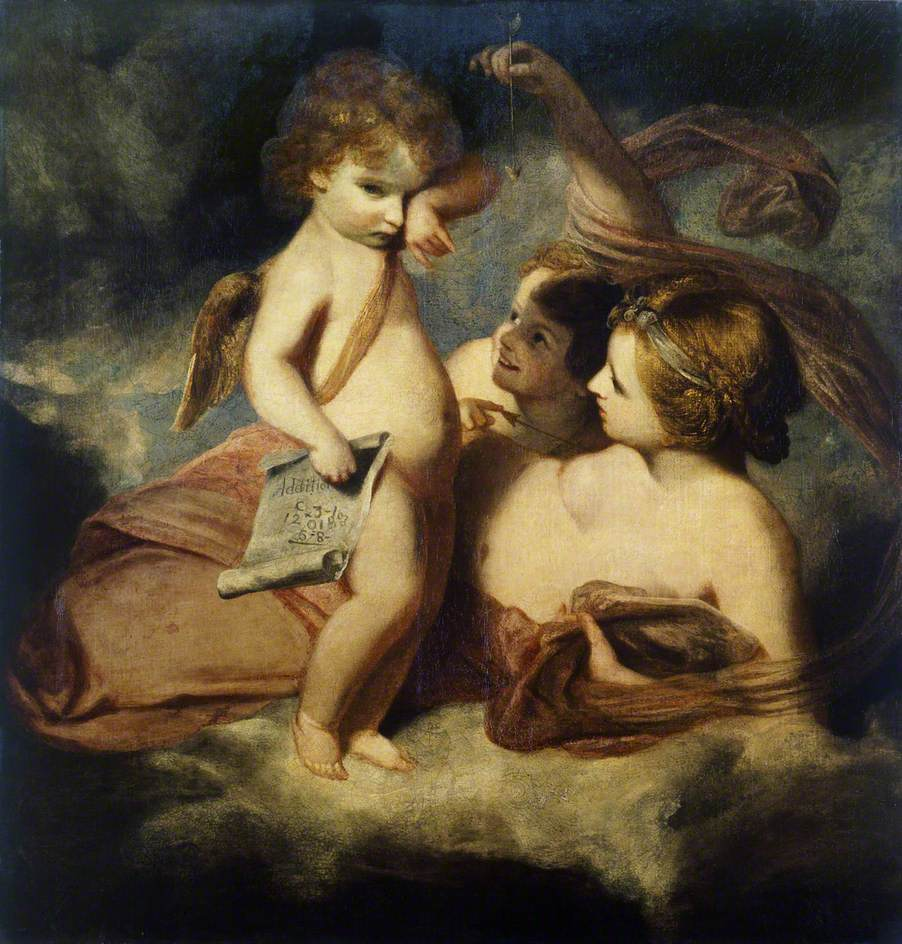
Venus Chiding Cupid for Learning to Cast Accounts by Joshua Reynolds

A Girl Reading, Portrait of Theophila Palmer by Joshua Reynolds

Portrait of Lady Ligonier by Thomas Gainsborough

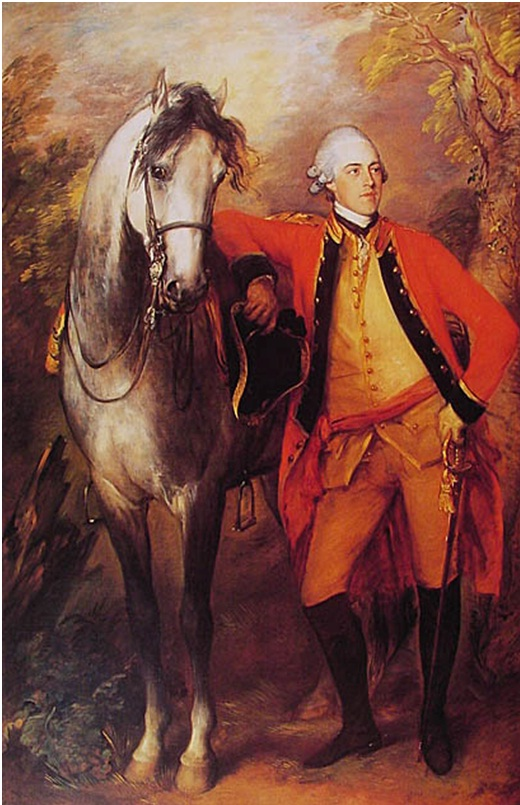
Portrait of Lord Ligonier by Thomas Gainsborough

Portrait of Captain William Wade by Thomas Gainsborough

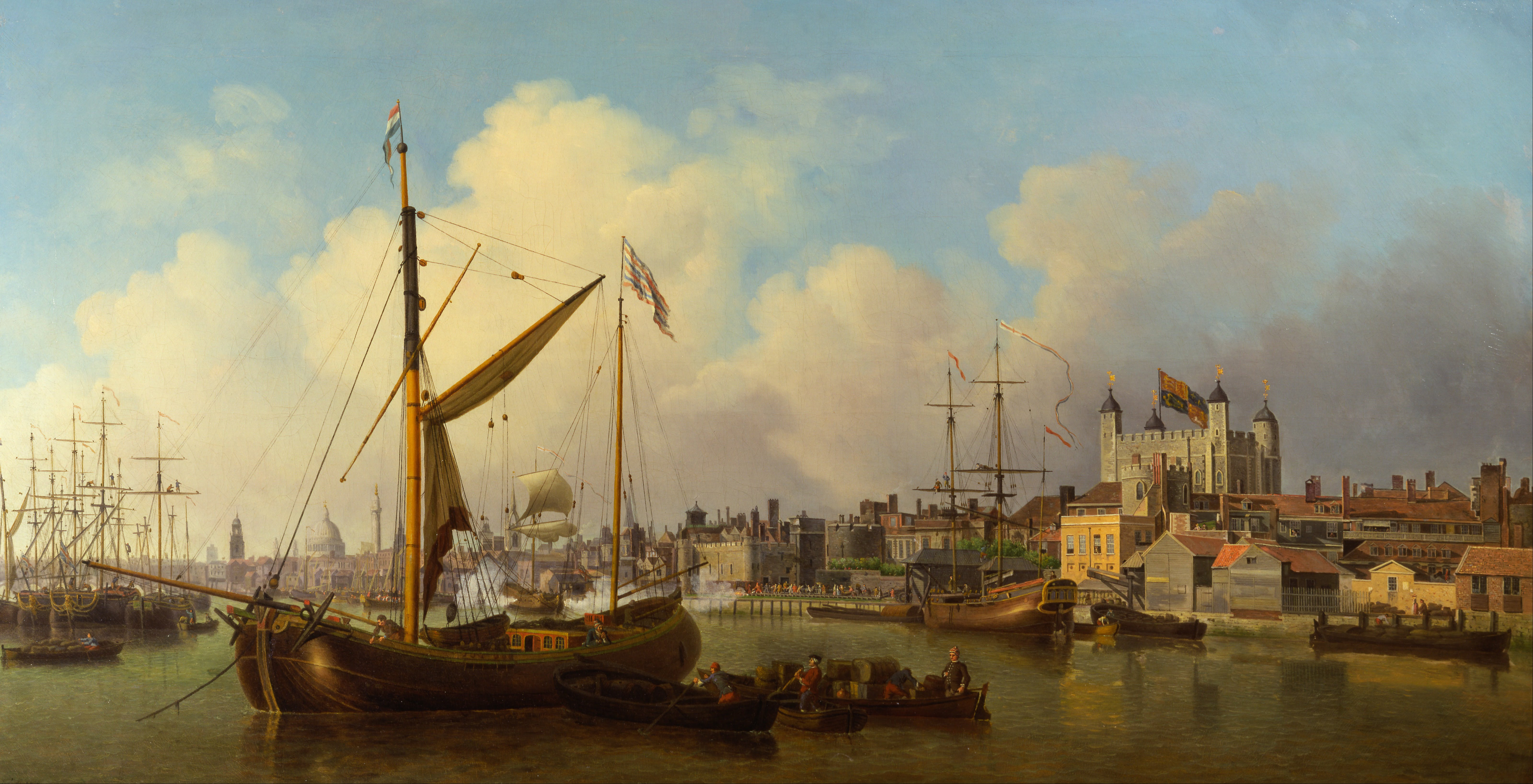
The Thames and the Tower of London by Samuel Scott

== See also ==
- Salon of 1771, contemporary exhibition in Paris
- Royal Academy Exhibition of 1772, the following year's exhibition at the same venue

== Bibliography ==
- Alexander, David S. Angelica Kauffman: A Continental Artist in Georgian England. 1992.
- Fordham, Douglas. British Art and the Seven Years' War: Allegiance and Autonomy. University of Pennsylvania Press, 2010.
- Hamilton, James. Gainsborough: A Portrait. Hachette UK, 2017.
- Hargreaves, Matthew. Candidates for Fame: The Society of Artists of Great Britain, 1760-1791. Paul Mellon Centre for Studies in British Art, 2005.
- Kenny, Shirley Strum (ed.) British Theatre and the Other Arts, 1660-1800. Associated University Presses, 1984.
- McIntyre, Ian. Joshua Reynolds: The Life and Times of the First President of the Royal Academy. Allen Lane, 2003.
- McNairn, Alan. Behold the Hero: General Wolfe and the Arts in the Eighteenth Century. McGill-Queen's Press, 1997
