= Dinas Bran from Llangollen =

Painting by Richard Wilson

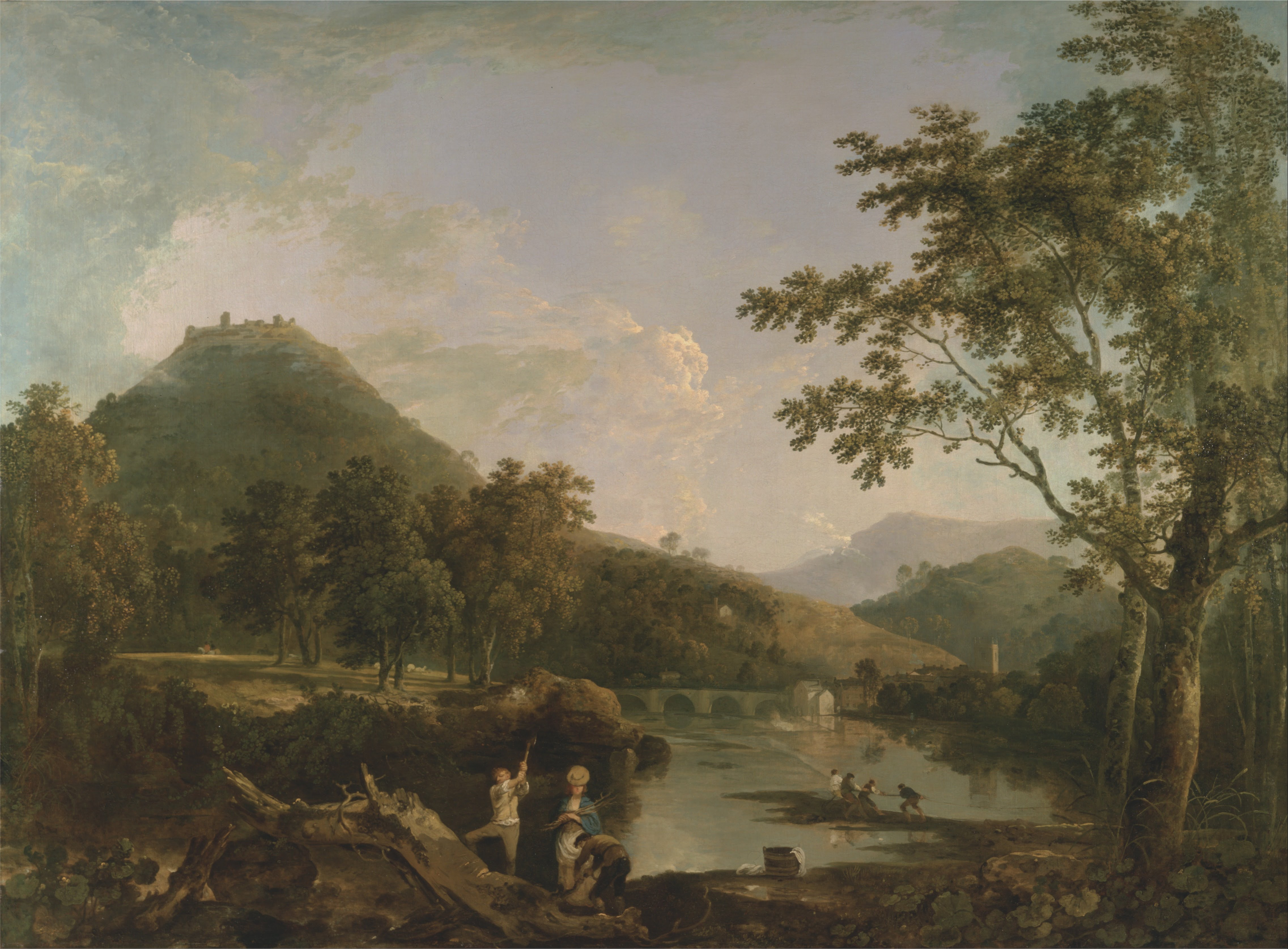
- Artist: Richard Wilson
- Year: c.1771
- Type: Oil on canvas, landscape painting
- Dimensions: 180.3 cm × 244.8 cm (71.0 in × 96.4 in)
- Location: Yale Center for British Art, Connecticut

Dinas Bran from Llangollen is a 1771 landscape painting by the British artist Richard Wilson. It depicts a view of the medieval Castell Dinas Brân, seen from Llangollen on the River Dee in North Wales. In line with the emerging Romanticism it exaggerates the scale of the fortress for effect rather than relying on topographical accuracy. Wilson had spent several years in Italy which strongly influenced his style. He returned to Britain and painted many views of his native Wales. This painting was commissioned as one of a pendant pair along with View near Wynnstay by the Welsh Tory politician Sir Watkin Williams-Wynn for his London residence. They were produced to celebrate his coming-of-age in 1769. Williams-Wynn shared with Wilson a strong pride in Welsh history. It was displayed at the Royal Academy Exhibition of 1771 in Pall Mall. Today the painting is in the Yale Center for British Art in Connecticut as part of the Paul Mellon Collection.

== Bibliography ==
- Bindman, David. The History of British Art: The history of British art, 1600-1870. Yale Center for British Art, 2008.
- Solkin, David H. Richard Wilson: The Landscape of Reaction. Tate Gallery, 1982.
