= View near Wynnstay =

Painting by Richard Wilson

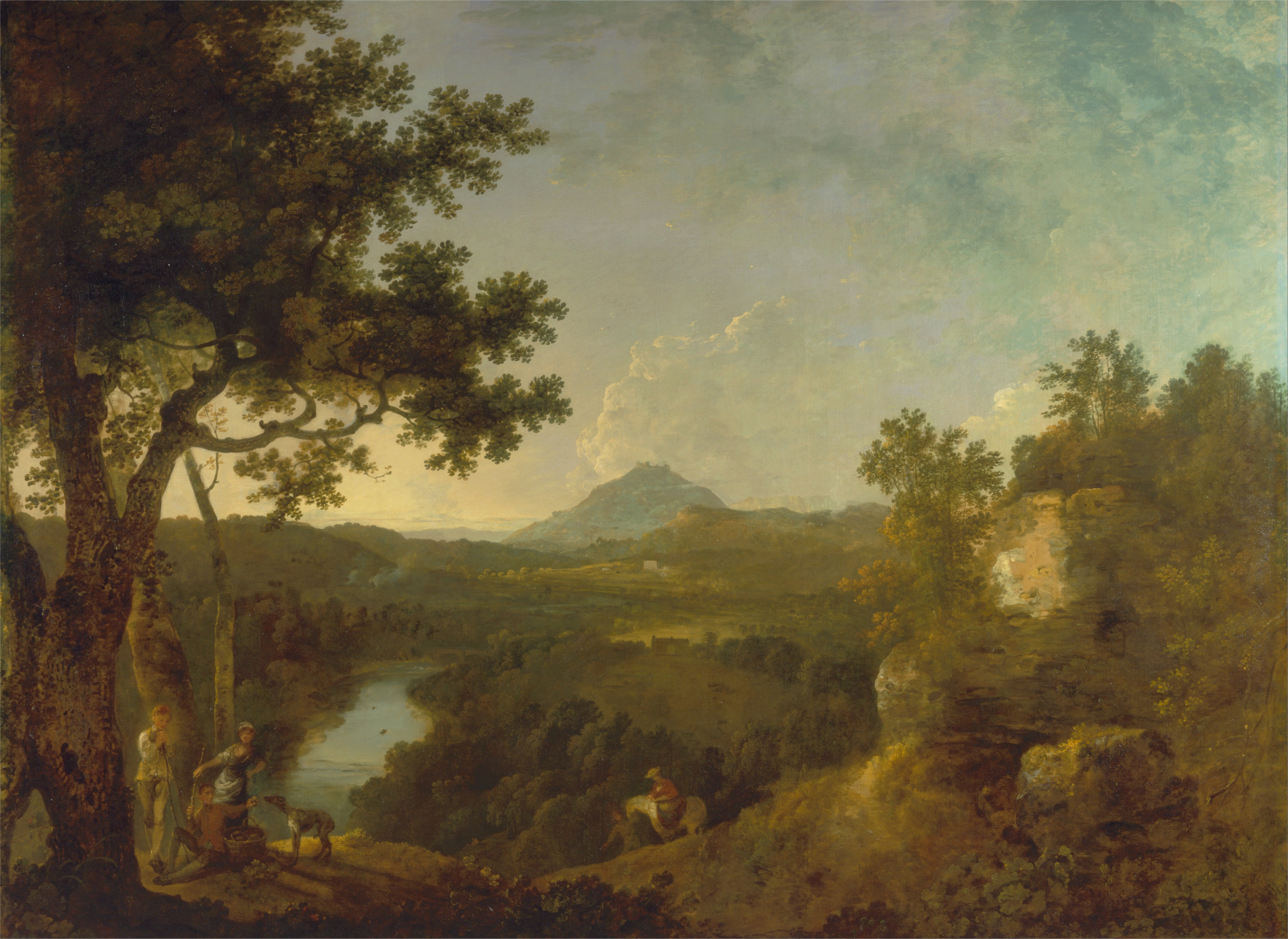
- Artist: Richard Wilson
- Year: c.1771
- Type: Oil on canvas, landscape painting
- Dimensions: 180.3 cm × 244.8 cm (71.0 in × 96.4 in)
- Location: Yale Center for British Art, Connecticut

View near Wynnstay is a 1771 landscape painting by the British artist Richard Wilson. It depicts a panoramic view along the River Dee in North Wales looking towards the historic Castell Dinas Brân in the distance. Wilson took his view from a cliff at Nant y Belan tower on the Wynnstay estate. Also visible is the neighbouring country estate Trevor Hall and in the very far distance the mountains of Snowdonia . The painting was commissioned in 1769 by the owner of Wynnstay, the Welsh Tory politician Sir Watkin Williams-Wynn to commemorate his twenty first birthday. Unusually for such commissions from landowners during the period, it doesn't depict Wynnstay Hall itself.

It is a companion piece of Dinas Bran from Llangollen which depicts the castle from Llangollen further down the Dee Valley. The two landscapes were displayed by Wilson at the Royal Academy Exhibition of 1771 in London. Today both paintings are in the Yale Center for British Art in Connecticut as part of the Paul Mellon Collection.

== Bibliography ==
- Bindman, David. The History of British Art: The history of British art, 1600-1870. Yale Center for British Art, 2008.
- Pavord, Anna. Landskipping: Painters, Ploughmen and Places. Bloomsbury, 2017.
- Rosenthal, Michael British Landscape Painting. Cornell University Press, 1982.
- Solkin, David H. Richard Wilson: The Landscape of Reaction. Tate Gallery, 1982.
