= Portrait of George III (Zoffany) =

Painting by Johann Zoffany

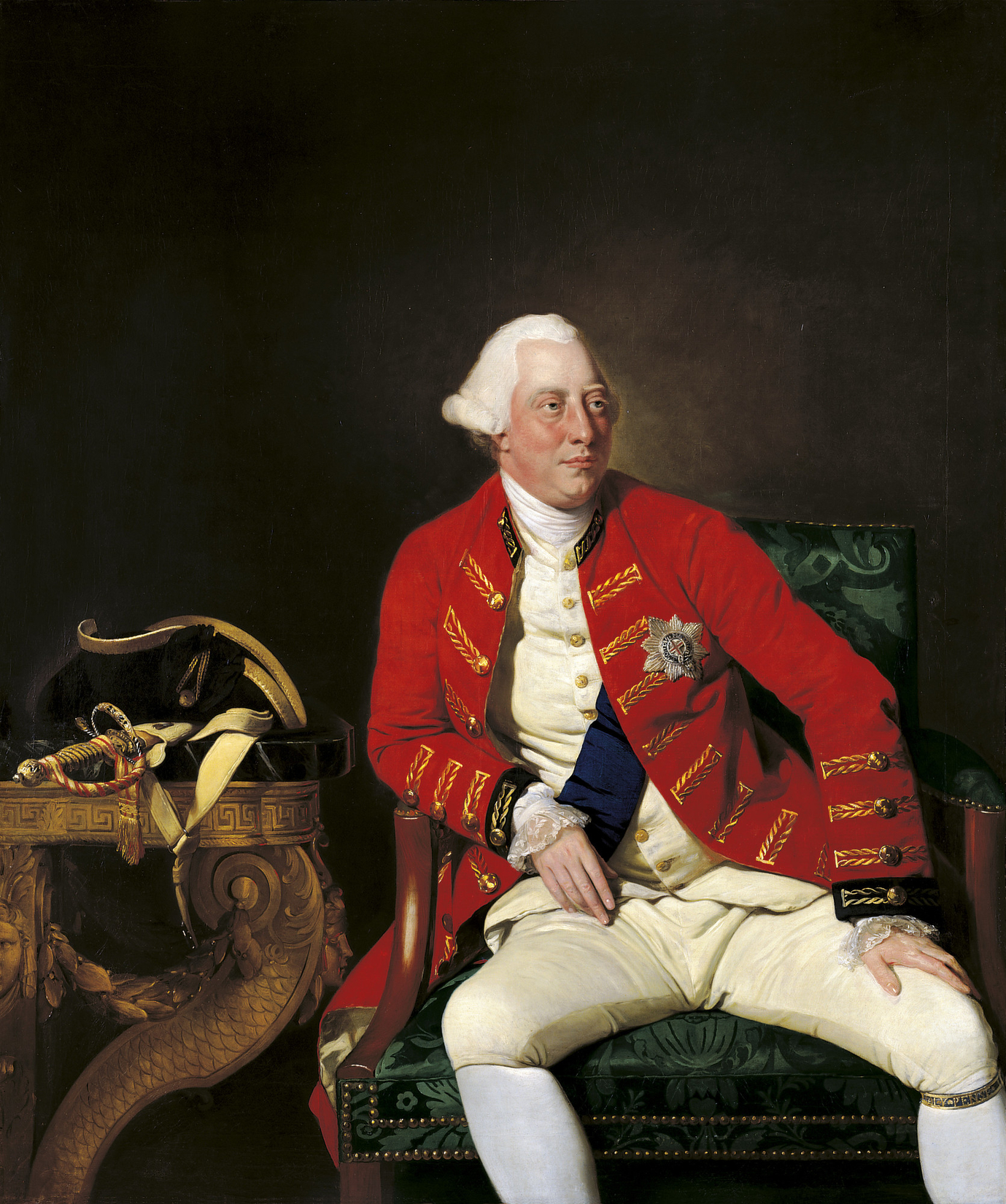
- Artist: Johan Zoffany
- Year: 1771
- Type: Oil on canvas, portrait painting
- Dimensions: 163.2 cm × 137.3 cm (64.3 in × 54.1 in)
- Location: Royal Collection; London

Portrait of George III is a 1771 portrait painting by the German-born British artist Johan Zoffany. It depicts the reigning British monarch George III.

The painting was displayed at the Royal Academy Exhibition of 1771 held in Pall Mall, London. Commissioned by either George or his wife, Queen Charlotte, it was hanging in Kensington Palace in 1790 but by 1819 had shifted to the Dining Room at Buckingham Palace. It remains in the Royal Collection.

== Bibliography ==
- Roberts, Jane. George III and Queen Charlotte: Patronage, Collecting and Court Taste. Royal Collection, 2004.
- Scott, Jennifer Anne. The Royal Portrait: Image and Impact. Royal Collection Publications, 2010.
- Treadwell, Penelope. Johan Zoffany: Artist and Adventurer. Paul Holberton, 2009.
