= John Gage (art historian) =

English art historian (1938–2012)

John Stephen Gage, FRSA, FBA (28 June 1938 – 10 February 2012) was an art historian known for his work on the use of colour in art. He was an authority on the work of J. M. W. Turner, about which he wrote three books and edited a collection of the artist's letters.

== Early life ==
John Gage was born in Bromley, Kent, on 28 June 1938, the son of an accountant. He was educated at Rye Grammar School and then at The Queen's College, University of Oxford, from where he graduated with a third class degree in modern history.

== Career ==
Gage's early career was teaching English in Florence while he studied Italian art. After he returned to England, he taught in art schools, including the Royal College of Art. He completed a PhD in 1967 at the Courtauld Institute of Art under Michael Kitson that was published in 1969 as Colour in Turner: Poetry and truth. He then spent the years 1967 to 1979 at the University of East Anglia, teaching under Peter Lasko. He joined the University of Cambridge in 1979 where he was head of the History of Art department from 1992 to 1995. From 1995 he was a reader at the university before retiring in 2000.

His master-work was his book Colour and culture: Practice and meaning from antiquity to abstraction (1993), which won the Mitchell Prize for Art History and was translated into five languages. He also wrote three books on the art of J.M.W. Turner and edited a collection of the artist's letters.

Gage was elected a fellow of the Royal Society of Arts in 1975 and of the British Academy in 1995.

== Personal life ==
Gage married Penelope Kenrick in 1978 with whom he had a daughter. The marriage was dissolved in 2002.

== Death ==
Gage died on 10 February 2012.

== Selected publications ==
- Colour in Turner: Poetry and truth. Studio Vista, London, 1969. ISBN 978-0289795606
- Turner's "Rain, Steam and Speed". Allen Lane, London, 1972. (Art in Context series) ISBN 978-0713902167
- Collected correspondence of J.M.W. Turner: With an early diary and a memoir by George Jones. Oxford University Press, Oxford, 1980. (Editor) ISBN 978-0198173038
- J.M.W. Turner: A wonderful range of mind. Yale University Press, New Haven, 1987. ISBN 9780300037791
- Colour and culture: Practice and meaning from antiquity to abstraction. Thames & Hudson, London, 1993. (World of Art series) ISBN 978-0500236543
- Colour and meaning: Art, science and Symbolism. Thames & Hudson, London, 1999. ISBN 0500237670
- Colour in art. Thames & Hudson, London, 2006. (World of Art) ISBN 978-0500203941
