= The Death of General Wolfe =

1770 painting by Benjamin West

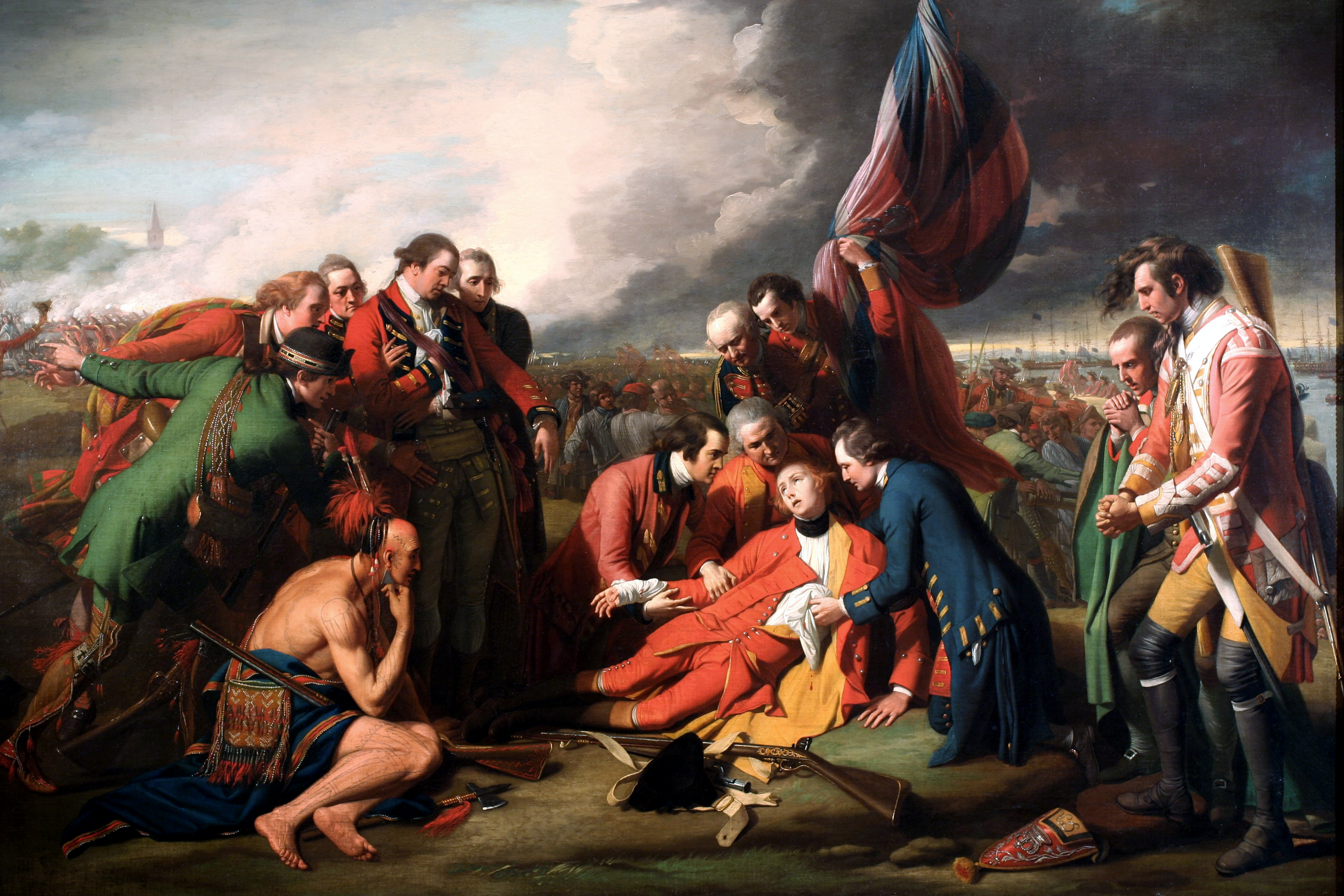
- Artist: Benjamin West
- Year: 1770
- Medium: Oil on canvas
- Dimensions: 151 cm × 213 cm (59 in × 84 in)
- Location: National Gallery of Canada, Ottawa

The Death of General Wolfe is a 1770 painting by Anglo-American artist Benjamin West, commemorating the 1759 Battle of Quebec, where General James Wolfe died at the moment of victory. The painting, containing vivid suggestions of martyrdom, broke a standard rule of historical portraiture by featuring individuals who had not been present at the scene and dressed in modern, instead of classical, costumes. The painting has become one of the best-known images in 18th-century art.

== Historical context ==
The Death of General Wolfe depicts the Battle of Quebec, also known as the Battle of the Plains of Abraham, on September 13, 1759. This was a pivotal event in the Seven Years' War and decided the fate of France's colonies in North America.

The battle was fought between the British Army and the French Army; the pitched fighting lasted only fifteen minutes. The British Army was commanded by General Wolfe. Although successful in holding the British line against the French and winning the battle, General Wolfe was mortally wounded by several gunshots.

In death, General Wolfe gained fame as a national hero. He became an icon of Great Britain's victory during the Seven Years' War to people throughout the British Empire. There were lines to see this painting stretching out the door at its first exhibition in London.

== Details ==
West depicts General Wolfe as a Christ-like figure. This painting has a triangular composition, made by the top of the flag (as the apex) and the positions of the men. It resembles Christian "Lamentation" scenes, where Christ is held in the embrace of the Virgin Mary.

Captain Hervey Smythe, who fought alongside Wolfe during the Gulf of St. Lawrence Campaign (1758), is pictured holding Wolfe's right arm.

The depiction of the Indigenous warrior in the painting, by kneeling with his chin on his fist and looking at General Wolfe, has been analyzed in various ways. In art, the touching of one's face with one's hand is a sign of deep thought and intelligence (thus, Auguste Rodin's The Thinker). Some consider it an idealization inspired by the noble savage concept. Original items of clothing that were used as a model for portraying the warrior in the painting can be found in the British Museum's collection (as well as additional First Nations' artifacts used in other paintings by West).

On the ground in front of Wolfe are his musket, cartridge box and bayonet. Wolfe went into battle armed as his men were, but his musket was of higher quality. His dress is also of note. He is wearing a red coat, a red waistcoat, red breeches and a white shirt. Such dress was rather simple, especially for a commanding officer.

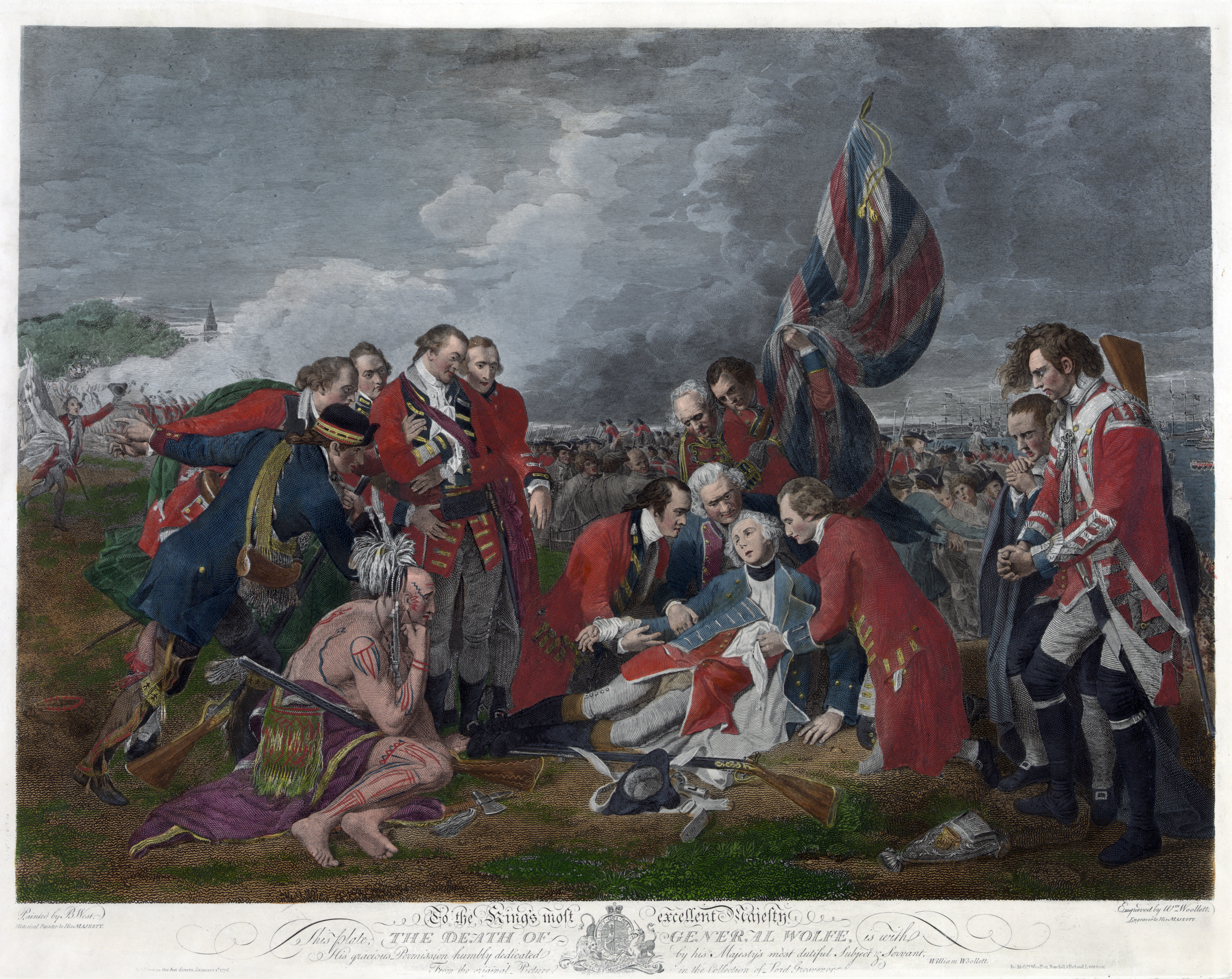
William Woollett's engraving was the best-known copy of West's original and became popular around the world

Next to Wolfe, in the blue jacket, is Dr Thomas Hinde, who is attempting to stem the bleeding from Wolfe's wounds. The general later died in the doctor's hands.

In the background and to the left of the men surrounding Wolfe, an approaching runner is depicted. He is waving his hat in one hand to attract their attention and in the other hand carries a captured flag with the fleur-de-lis, a symbol of France, symbolic of the news relayed to the dying Wolfe that the French were being defeated. Later versions also show General Montcalm, also mortally wounded in the battle, being shot from his horse in the far background.

The inclusion of Simon Fraser, Lieutenant Colonel of the 78th Fraser Highlanders (behind the man in green uniform, identified in the painting as Sir William Johnson) is interesting, as General Wolfe reportedly spoke highly of Fraser's regiment, but Fraser was not at the battle, as he was recovering from wounds received earlier. In the painting, Fraser wears the Fraser tartan, which was probably worn by officers in that regiment. All in all, only four of the fourteen men depicted were actually at the battleground.

West's choice to depict his subjects in contemporary clothing was highly controversial at the time. Although the depicted events had taken place only eleven years earlier, the prevailing convention of West's time would have been to convey such subject matter in a history painting, an artistic tradition in which the portrayal of contemporary dress was considered unsuitable. During the painting process, Sir Joshua Reynolds instructed West to clothe the subjects in classical attire to which West declined. After the completion of the painting, George III refused to purchase it since he believed that West's choice of clothing compromised the dignity of the image. However, subsequent years brought a shift in opinion and artistic convention, and the painting was largely redeemed and overcame earlier objections, inaugurating a practice of greater contemporary accuracy in history painting.

The painting was originally exhibited at the Royal Academy Exhibition of 1771 at Pall Mall in London. It was presented to Canada in 1921 as a tribute for its service in the First World War.

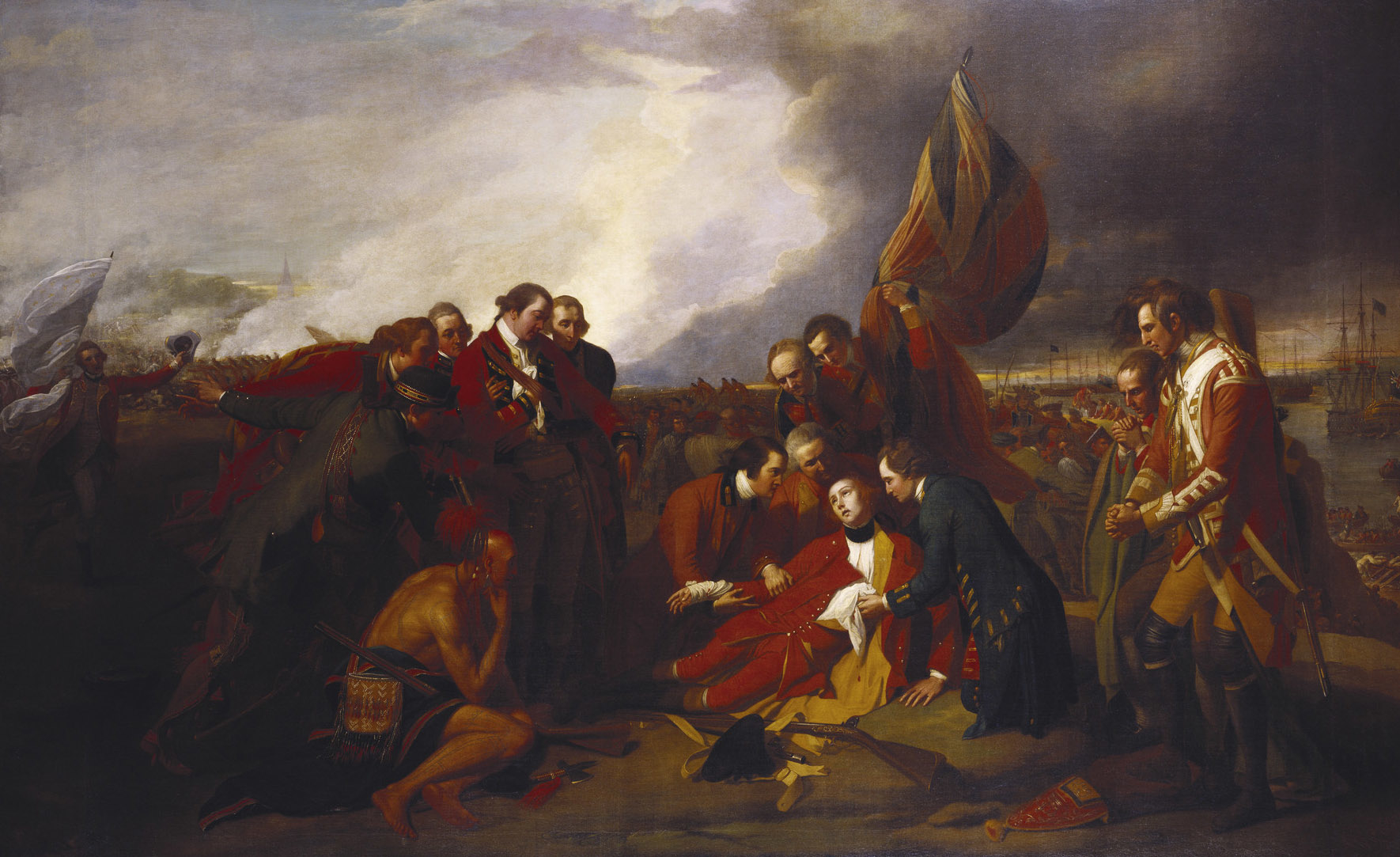
Later versions by West, this one from 1771, make the messenger carrying the captured flag more visible, along with a very faint depiction of the death of Montcalm.

William Woollett's engraving was the best-known copy of West's original painting and became popular around the world. A black-and-white copy of the engraving can be seen at Brodick Castle, on the Isle of Arran, Scotland.

== Variants ==
Besides the original, at least four other additional versions of the Death of General Wolfe were also produced by West. The primary copy of The Death of General Wolfe is in the collection of the National Gallery of Canada, with further examples kept at the Royal Ontario Museum (as part of the Canadiana art collection) and the William L. Clements Library at the University of Michigan. The fourth copy produced resides at Ickworth House, Suffolk, England. Each reproduction had its own variation in the depiction of Wolfe's death. A fifth autograph copy was commissioned by George III in 1771 and is in the Royal Collection.

== Artistic interpretation ==
West's depiction of Wolfe's death in the midst of battle is figurative, rather than literal. The painting, though widely celebrated, has also been heavily criticised in its historically-inaccurate portrayal of Wolfe's death itself. For example, the prominent figures surrounding and observing Wolfe as he lay dying are a great example of artistic interpretation.

There is no evidence that any of the figures surrounding Wolfe in the painting were actually present at his death. All of them were senior military figures and would have been busy elsewhere in battle because Wolfe died at the height of the battle itself and not afterward. However, West's choice to show Wolfe's death in the figurative manner of a dying martyr, many comparing it to Christ, transforms Wolfe's death from a simple casualty of war to one of a hero that symbolized the British cause.

== Contemporary response ==
The historical liberties taken by West were addressed by Saulteaux First Nations Canadian artist Robert Houle, who encountered Death of General Wolfe at the National Gallery of Canada in Ottawa. A collection of responses by the artist were shown in a 1993 exhibition Kanata: Robert Houle's Histories at the Carleton University Art Gallery. Houle's most prominent critique took the form of Kanata (1992), which used appropriation to highlight the fictional presence of indigenous combatants in West's work. By quieting the majority of the canvas to sepia tone, the viewer's eye is drawn to the remaining color: the blanket surrounding the Delaware warrior in the case of Kanata.

== Legacy ==
Despite the fact that the painting is a more dramatized version of Wolfe's death than reality, West's work was groundbreaking for art of its time. Previously, contemporary scenes were painted in a Greek and Roman setting. Others advised West against using realistic 18th-century visuals such as modern costumes. Although Wolfe's death had already been painted by at least two other artists before West, and both paintings also strove to portray Wolfe and his death in a more realistic style, the success of West's painting helped to further establish a new style of art that others had already begun to pioneer. The painting has also been reinterpreted by different artists, such as Walton Ford's Dying Words (2005) which instead uses the extinct Carolina parakeet as its drawn subjects. Wolfe's death and the portrayal of that event by Benjamin West make up half of Simon Schama's historical work Dead Certainties: Unwarranted Speculations (1991).

== See also ==
- Great Britain in the Seven Years' War
