= 1780 in art =

Events from the year 1780 in art.

== Events ==
- 1 May – The Royal Academy Exhibition of 1780 opens in London, the first to be held at the Academy's new headquarters at Somerset House

== Works ==
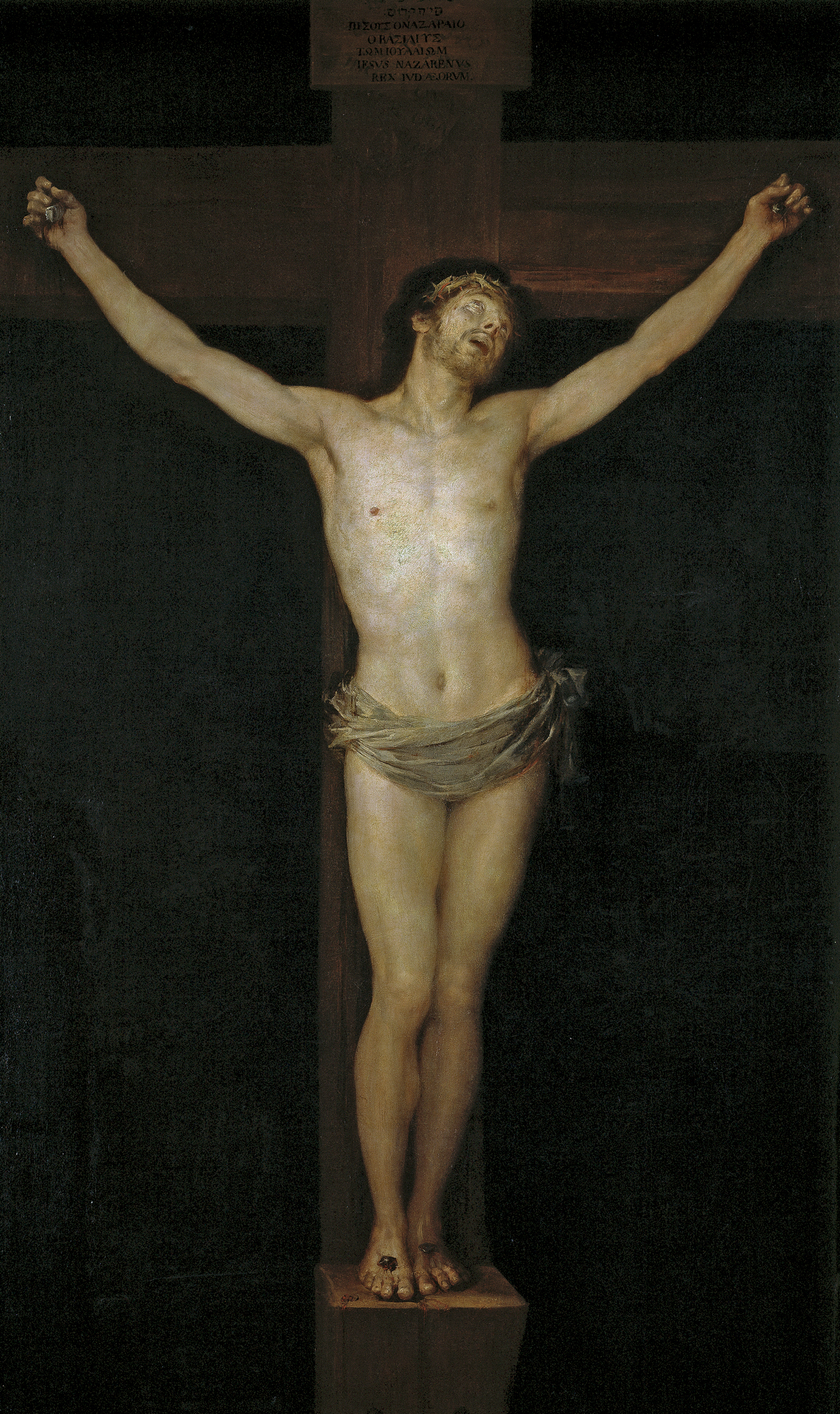
Goya's entry work for the Real Academia de Bellas Artes de San Fernando

- Antoine-François Callet – Portrait of the Comte de Vergennes
- John Singleton Copley – Portrait of Hugh Montgomerie
- Jacques-Louis David
  - Portrait of Count Stanislas Potocki
  - Saint Roch Interceding with the Virgin for the Plague-Stricken
- Thomas Gainsborough
  - Portrait of Henry Seymour Conway
  - Portrait of Jeffery Amherst
- Jean-Pierre Norblin de La Gourdaine – Les Marionettes polonaises
- Francisco Goya – Christ Crucified
- William Hamilton – Sarah Siddons as Euphrasia
- Francis Holman – The moonlight Battle of Cape St Vincent, 16 January 1780
- Philip James de Loutherbourg – Warley Camp
- Jacob More
  - Landscape with Classical Figures, Cicero at his Villa
  - Mount Vesuvius in Eruption: The Last Days of Pompeii
- Joshua Reynolds
  - Portrait of Sir William Chambers
  - Self-Portrait
- George Romney – Portrait of James Macpherson
- John Trumbull – George Washington
- Francis Wheatley – The Irish House of Commons
- Johann Zoffany
  - Double Portrait of Henry and Mary Styleman (commissioned)
  - Portrait of Tipu Sultan

== Births ==
- January 10 – Pieter Christoffel Wonder, Dutch painter active in England (died 1852)
- February 15 – Alfred Edward Chalon, Swiss portrait painter (died 1860)
- February 18 – Alexey Venetsianov, Russian genre painter (died 1847)
- April 14 – Edward Hicks, American folk artist (died 1849)
- June 12 – Henry Hoppner Meyer, English portrait painter (died 1847)
- August 8 – Étienne Bouhot, French painter and art teacher (died 1862)
- August 29 – Jean-Auguste-Dominique Ingres, French Neoclassical painter (died 1867)
- September – Samuel Colman, English painter (died 1845)
- September 15 – Johann Peter Krafft, German-Austrian painter (died 1856)
- October 26 – Alexandre-Évariste Fragonard, French painter and sculptor in the troubadour style (died 1850)
- date unknown
  - Johann Adam Ackermann, German landscape painter (died 1853)
  - Giovacchino Cantini, Italian engraver (died 1844)
  - Jan Krzysztof Damel, Lithuanian neoclassicist painter (died 1840)

== Deaths ==
- February 14 – Gabriel de Saint-Aubin, French draftsman, printmaker, etcher and painter (born 1724)
- February 21 – Francesco Foschi, Italian landscape painter (born 1710)
- March 3 – Joseph Highmore, British portrait and historical painter (born 1692)
- May 6 – Gaspare Bazzani, Italian painter active in Reggio as a painter of vedute or landscapes (date of birth unknown)
- July 11 – Luis Egidio Meléndez, Spanish still-life painter (born 1716)
- September 6 – Françoise Basseporte, French court painter (born 1701)
- September 7 – Pieter Barbiers, Dutch painter (born 1717)
- October 17 – Bernardo Bellotto, Italian urban landscape painter or vedutista, and printmaker in etching (born 1720)
- date unknown
  - James Giles, British porcelain decorator (born 1718)
  - Dionigi Valesi, Italian printmaker active in Verona and Venice (born 1750)
- probable
  - Robert Hunter, Irish painter (date of birth unknown)
  - Nicolas Jean Baptiste Poilly, French draftsman and engraver (born 1712)
  - Rocco Pozzi, Italian painter and engraver (born 1700)
  - Wenceslaus Werlin, Austrian portrait artist (date of birth unknown)
