= Werlin =

Werlin is a surname. Notable people with the name include:

- Jakob Werlin (1886–1965), Austrian auto salesman
- Johann Werlin (died ca. 1680), German Baroque composer
- Nancy Werlin (born 1961), American writer of young-adult novels
- Wenceslaus Werlin (died 1780), Austrian painter

== See also ==
- Welin
