= Portrait of George III (West) =

Painting by Benjamin West

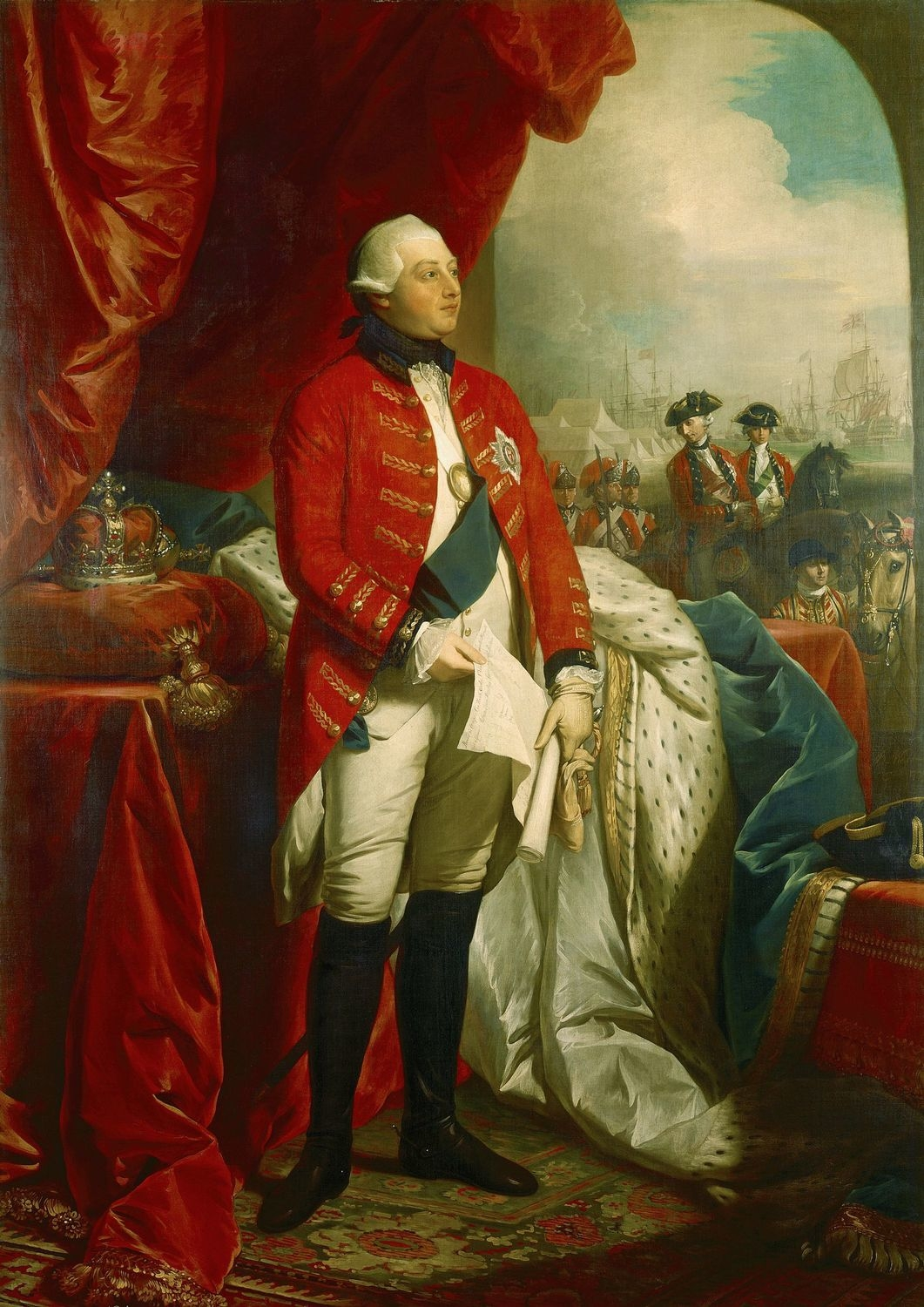
- Artist: Benjamin West
- Year: 1779
- Type: Oil on canvas, portrait painting
- Dimensions: 255.3 cm × 182.9 cm (100.5 in × 72.0 in)
- Location: Buckingham Palace; London

Portrait of George III is a 1779 portrait painting by the Anglo-American artist Benjamin West. It depicts George III the reigning monarch of Great Britain. Produced during the American War of Independence, it shows the king during the response to the Franco-Spanish Armada of 1779 when a combined fleet threatened Britain with invasion indicated by the military encampment and ships in the background. It was designed for the audience chamber at Hampton Court.

The king wears military uniform and holds a document outlining troops deployments. The two mounted officers in the background are Lord Amherst and the Marquess of Lothian. As Commander-in-Chief Amherst was responsible for overseeing defensive preparations to resist any French landing, summoning the militia of several counties and using the 15th Light Dragoons to patrol the coasts of Kent and Sussex, a detachment of whom can be seen in the background. Out to sea is the British fleet with HMS Royal George firing a salute.

West was a favoured artist of the king, who commissioned a number of history paintings from him. In 1792 he succeeded Joshua Reynolds to become the second President of the Royal Academy. The painting was displayed at the Royal Academy Exhibition of 1780 along with a companion piece Portrait of Queen Charlotte featuring Queen Charlotte as well as many of their children. Both works in the Royal Collection and hang in Buckingham Palace.

== Bibliography ==
- Black, Jeremy. George III: America's Last King. Yale University Press, 2008.
- Grossman, Lloyd. Benjamin West and the Struggle to be Modern. Merrell Publishers, 2015.
- Hoock, Holger. Scars of Independence: America's Violent Birth. Crown, 2017.
