= The Battle of La Hogue =

Painting by Benjamin West

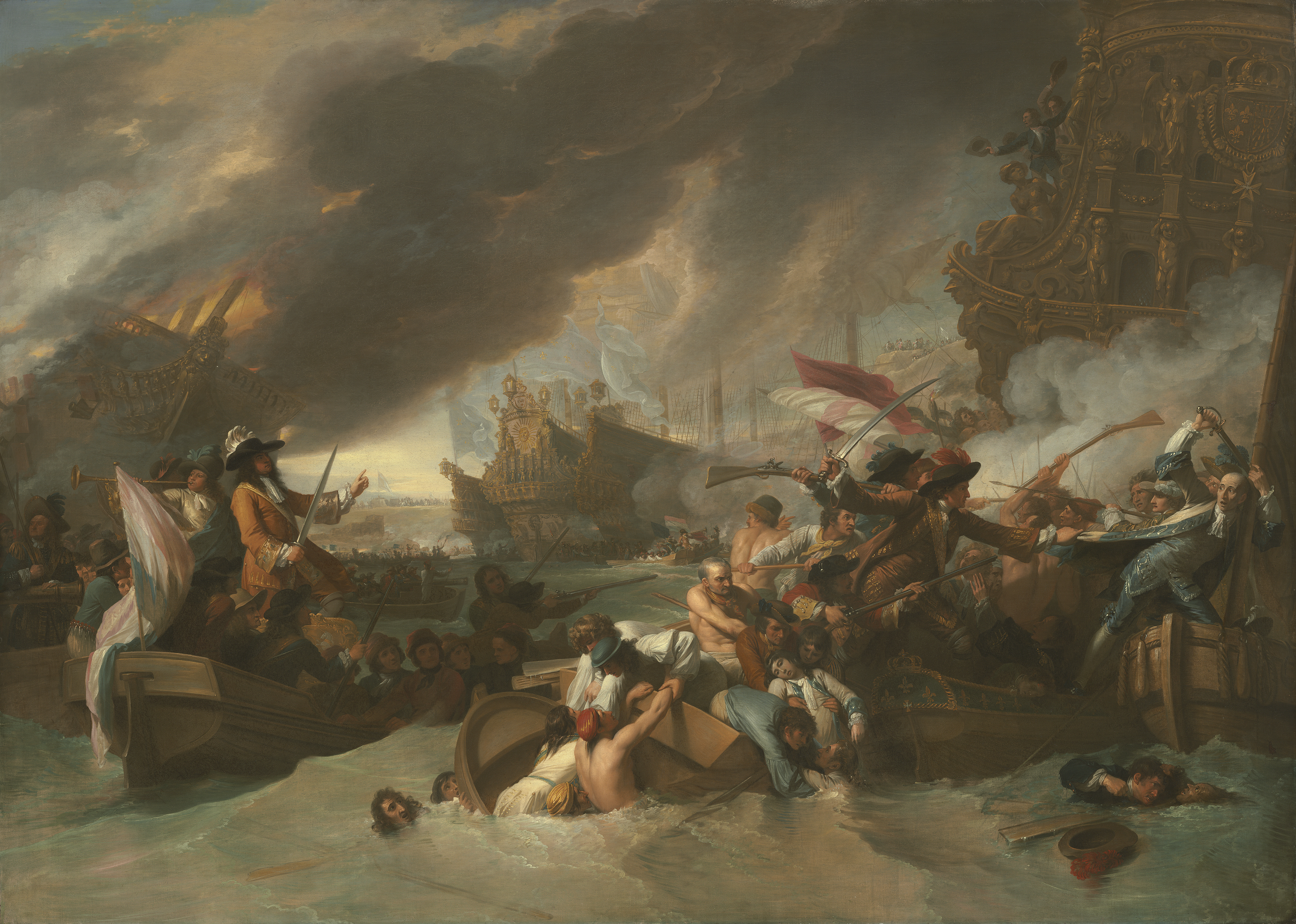
- Artist: Benjamin West
- Year: 1778
- Medium: Oil on canvas
- Dimensions: 152.7 cm × 214 cm (60.1 in × 84 in)
- Location: National Gallery of Art, Washington, D.C.

The Battle of La Hogue is a 1778 painting by the American-born painter Benjamin West depicting the 1692 Battle of La Hogue. Fought off the coast of Normandy, the battle was decisive victory for the Royal Navy and its Dutch allies, thwarting an expected French invasion of England.

West was a Pennsylvania-born artist who settled in England in the 1760s. He made his name with his 1770 epic painting The Death of General Wolfe. It was produced during the American Revolutionary War when Britain and France were again at war. West's The Battle of the Boyne, completed the same year, depicted a celebrated victory over French-Jacobite forces during same conflict. The two paintings were displayed at the Royal Academy Exhibition of 1780 at Somerset House, cementing his popularity. He received a number of commissions from George III and later became the second President of the Royal Academy.

West condensed the complex events of the battle into a single dramatic composition using poetic licence. Particular emphasis is given to George Rooke on the left of the painting standing upright in a boat with his sword raised. In the background the French ship-of-the-line Soleil Royal is being run aground. The work is in the collection of the National Gallery of Art in Washington, D.C.

== See also ==
- The Battle of Quiberon Bay, a 1779 painting by Dominic Serres depicting another major naval victory over France

== Bibliography ==
- Black, Jeremy. George III: America's Last King. Yale University Press, 2008.
- Hoock, Holger. The King's Artists: The Royal Academy of Arts and the Politics of British Culture 1760–1840. Clarendon Press, 2003.
- Staiti, Paul. Of Arms and Artists: The American Revolution Through Painters' Eyes. Bloomsbury Publishing USA, 2016.
- Wilmerding, John. American Marine Painting. Abrams, 1987.
