= The Battle of Quiberon Bay =

Painting by Dominic Serres

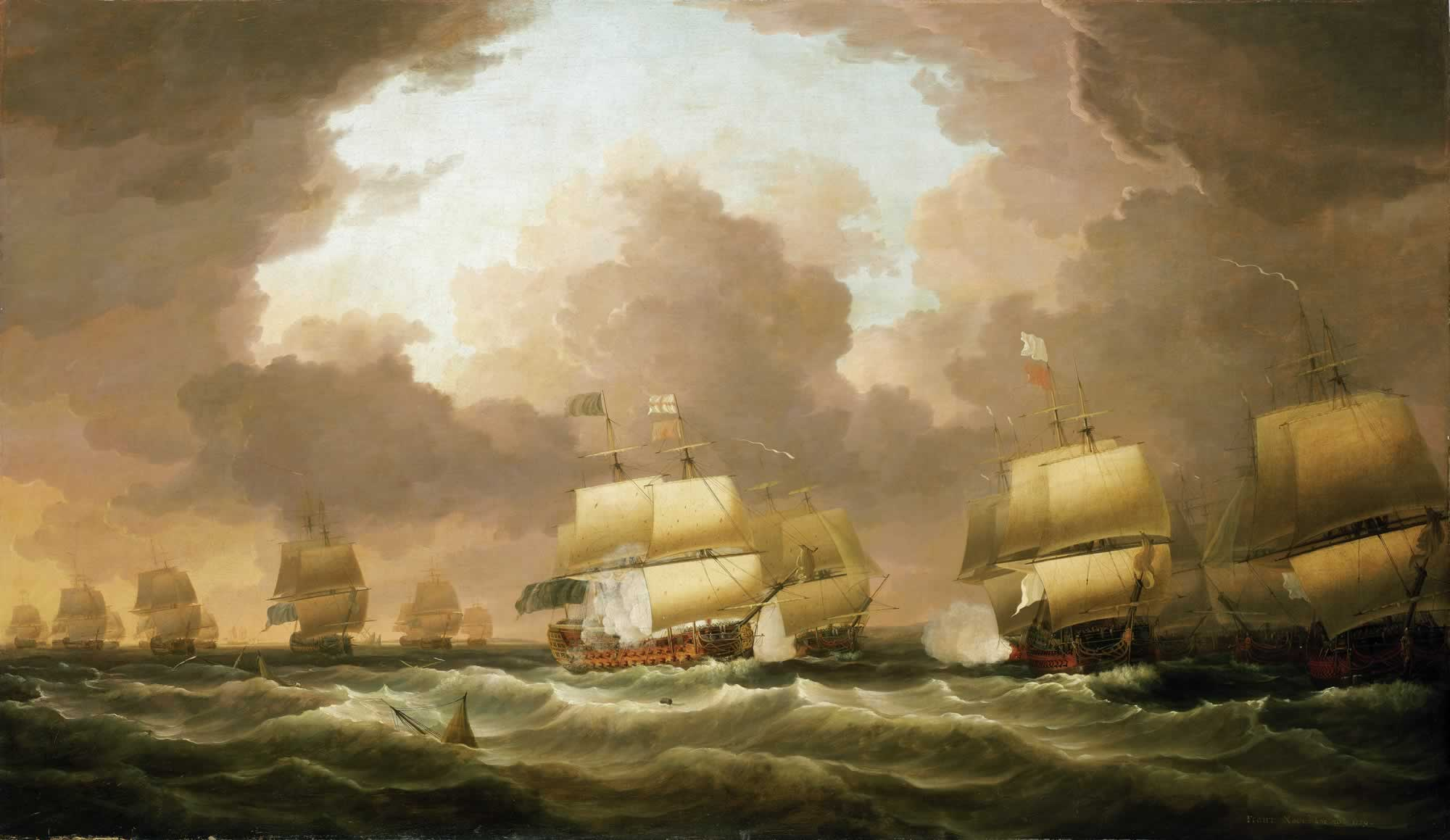
- Artist: Dominic Serres
- Year: 1779
- Medium: Oil on canvas
- Dimensions: 114.3 cm × 182.8 cm (45.0 in × 72.0 in)
- Location: National Maritime Museum, Greenwich

The Battle of Quiberon Bay is a 1779 history painting by the French-born British artist Dominic Serres. It depicts the naval Battle of Quiberon Bay on 20 November 1759 during the Seven Years' War. The decisive victory of Admiral Hawke's Royal Navy fleet thwarted a French invasion of Britain as part of the Annus Mirabilis.

A member of the Royal Academy, Serres was known for his works of marine art often focused on the conflicts Britain took part in during the eighteenth century. It was painted and exhibited the year Britain faced a similar threat of invasion during the American Revolutionary War. It is in the collection of the National Maritime Museum in Greenwich. Nicholas Pocock later produced a celebrated painting of the battle, also now at Greenwich.

== See also ==
- The Battle of La Hogue, a 1778 painting by Benjamin West of an earlier British naval victory over the French

== Bibliography ==
- Mackay, Ruddock F. Admiral Hawke. Clarendon Press, 1965.
- Russett, Alan. Dominic Serres, R.A., 1719–1793: War Artist to the Navy. Antique Collectors' Club, 2001.
