= Royal Academy Exhibition of 1780 =

1780 art exhibition in London

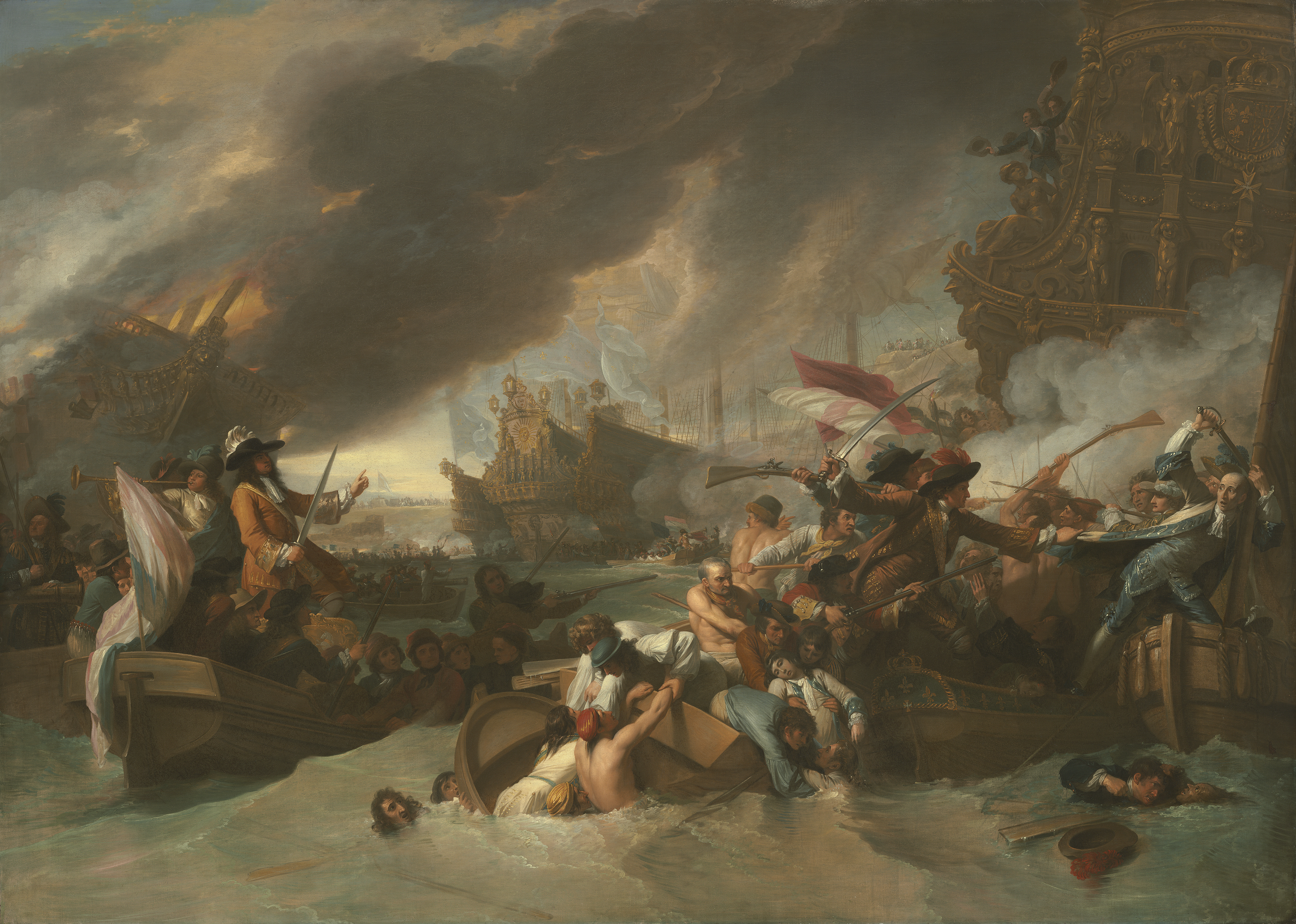
The Battle of La Hogue by Benjamin West

The Royal Academy Exhibition of 1780 was an art exhibition staged in London by the Royal Academy of Arts. Held between 1 May and 3 June 1780 it was the first to take place at the academy's new headquarters at Somerset House. 489 exhibits were on display and the event attracted more than 61,000 visitors.

Since the 1769 debut all Summer Exhibitions had taken place in a rented room in Pall Mall. The architect William Chambers designed the new purpose-built headquarters. It took place during the American War of Independence and in which the country faced a growing coalition of enemies. The previous year Britain had been threatened with invasion from a Franco-Spanish Armada. A number of the submissions made reference to the ongoing conflict.

Notable amongst the works on display was Johan Zoffany's The Tribuna of the Uffizi, a royal commission from Queen Charlotte which he had travelled to Florence to produce. Benjamin West submitted a large number of works including history paintings recounting victories in the Nine Years War almost a century earlier. He also showed a range of portraits of the royal family including George III, Charlotte and a joint picture of their sons William, Duke of Clarence and Edward, Duke of Kent. His fellow American John Singleton Copley submitted a full-length depiction of the Highland soldier Hugh Montgomerie. His more limited offering thay year was because he was working on his large The Death of the Earl of Chatham.

Joshua Reynolds, the President of the Royal Academy, demonstrated his versatility with a variety of submissions featuring the young Prince William Frederick and the historian Edward Gibbon. He also showed Justice part of his series featuring the four cardinal virtues. He also produced his own portraits of George III and Queen Charlotte to hang on the walls of the new academy. His Portrait of Lady Worsley featured a fashionable aristocratic wearing a costume inspired by the militia uniform of her husband's regiment. Other war-themed paintings were Francis Holman's The Moonlight Battle featuring a British naval victory over the Spanish while sailing to relieve the besieged garrison at Gibraltar. Philip James de Loutherbourg depicted Warley Camp a painting of a military review by George III of troops gathered to resist invasion.

Thomas Gainsborough submitted a number of painters but was disappointed by their placings in the exhibition, a growing issue with the academy which would ultimately lead to his boycotting it. His work on display included six landscapes and several portraits including his friend Henry Bate Dudley and the actor John Henderson. He also presented a portrait of the German musician Johann Christian Fischer, who was briefly his son-in-law. The Welsh landscape painter Richard Wilson exhibited Tabley House, Cheshire, a painting he had produced more than a decade earlier.

== Gallery ==
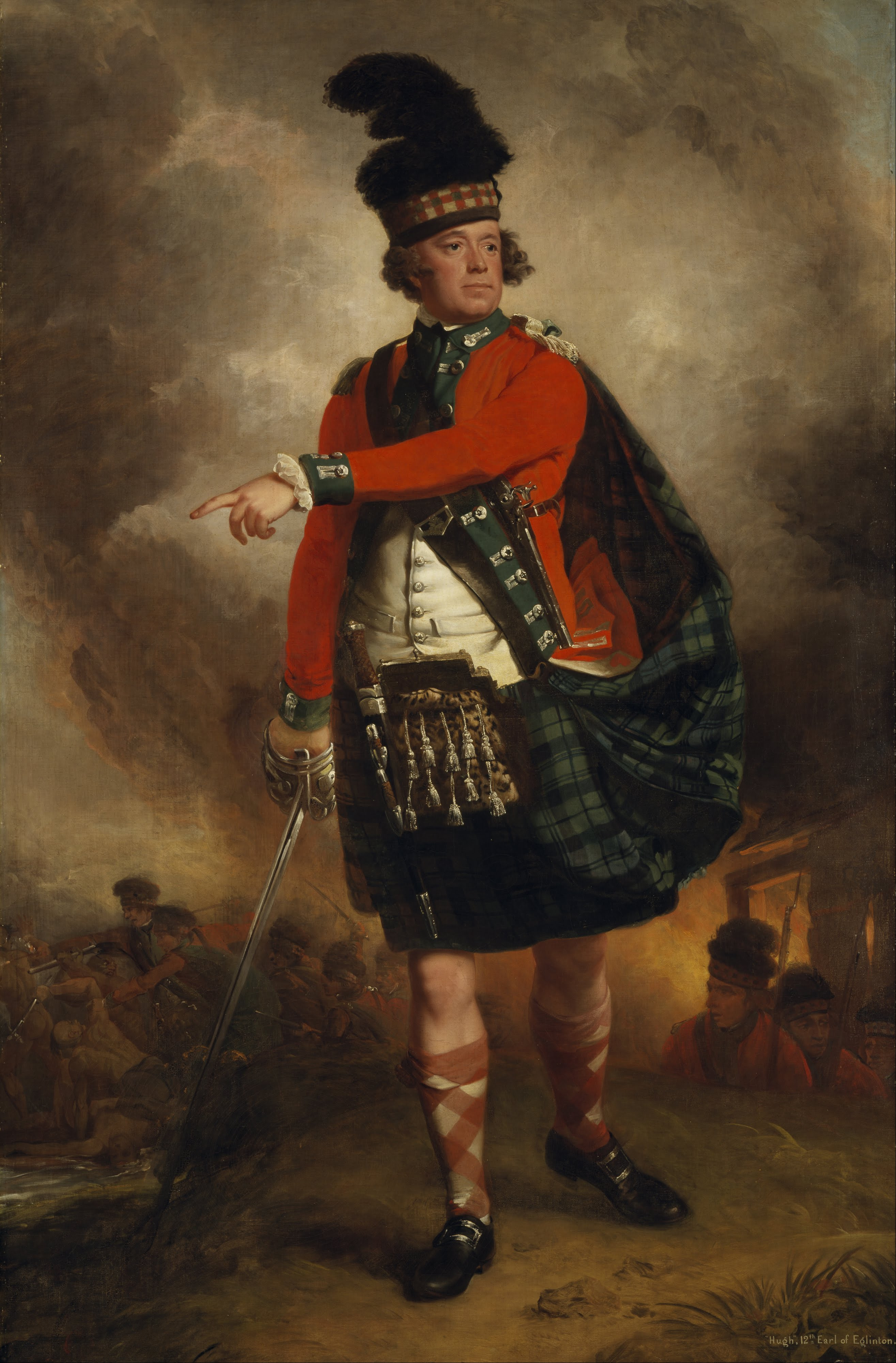
Portrait of Hugh Montgomerie by John Singleton Copley

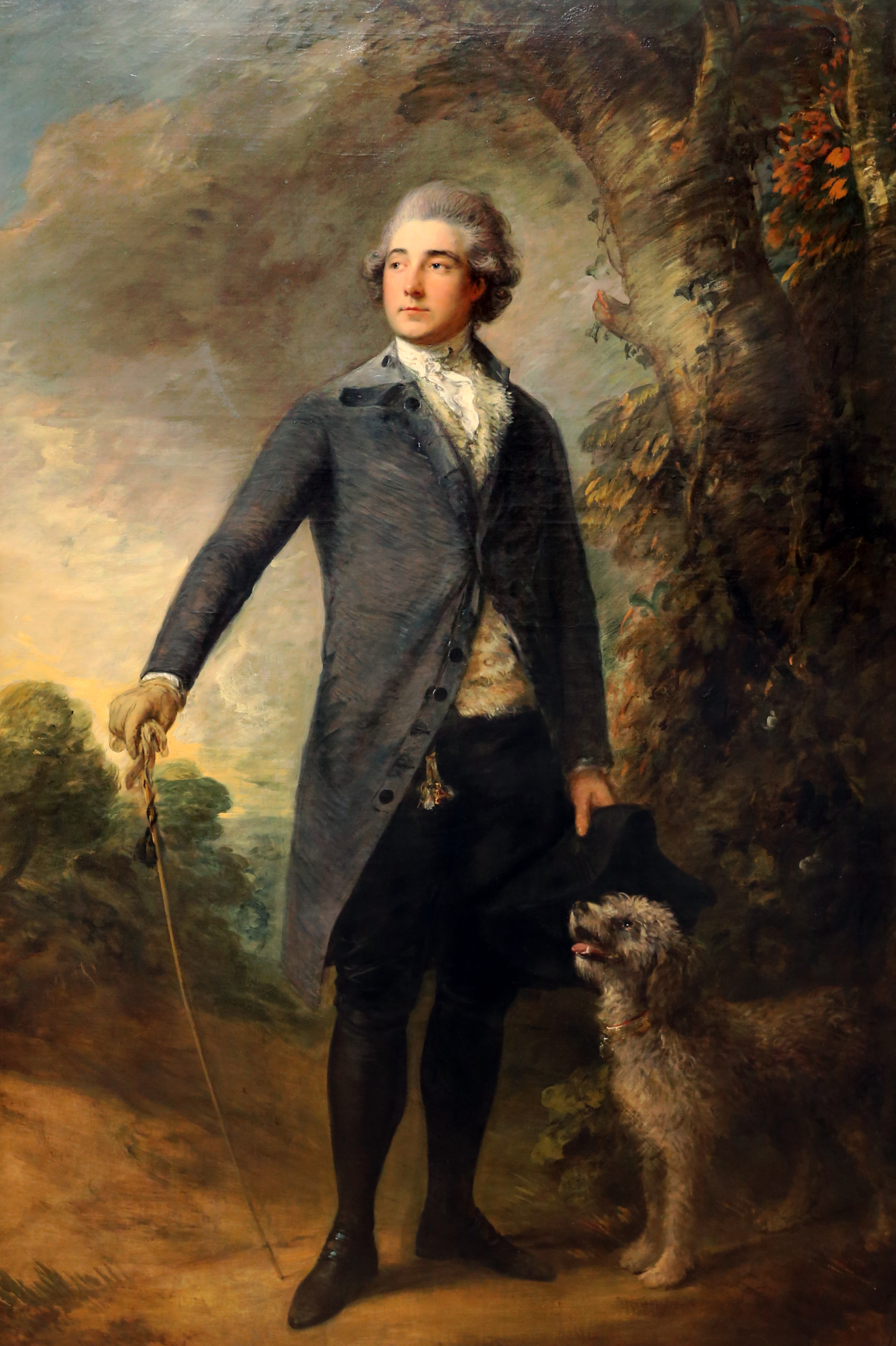
Portrait of Sir Henry Bate Dudley by Thomas Gainsborough

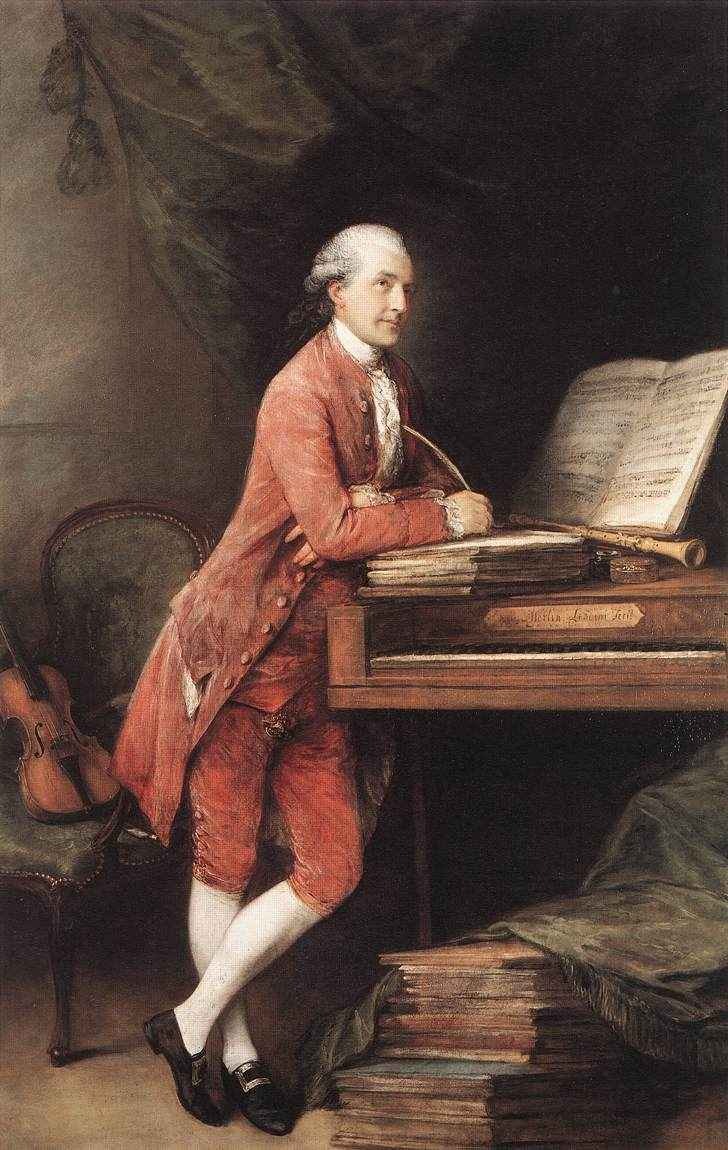
Portrait of Johann Christian Fischer by Thomas Gainsborough

Sarah Siddons as Euphrasia by William Hamilton

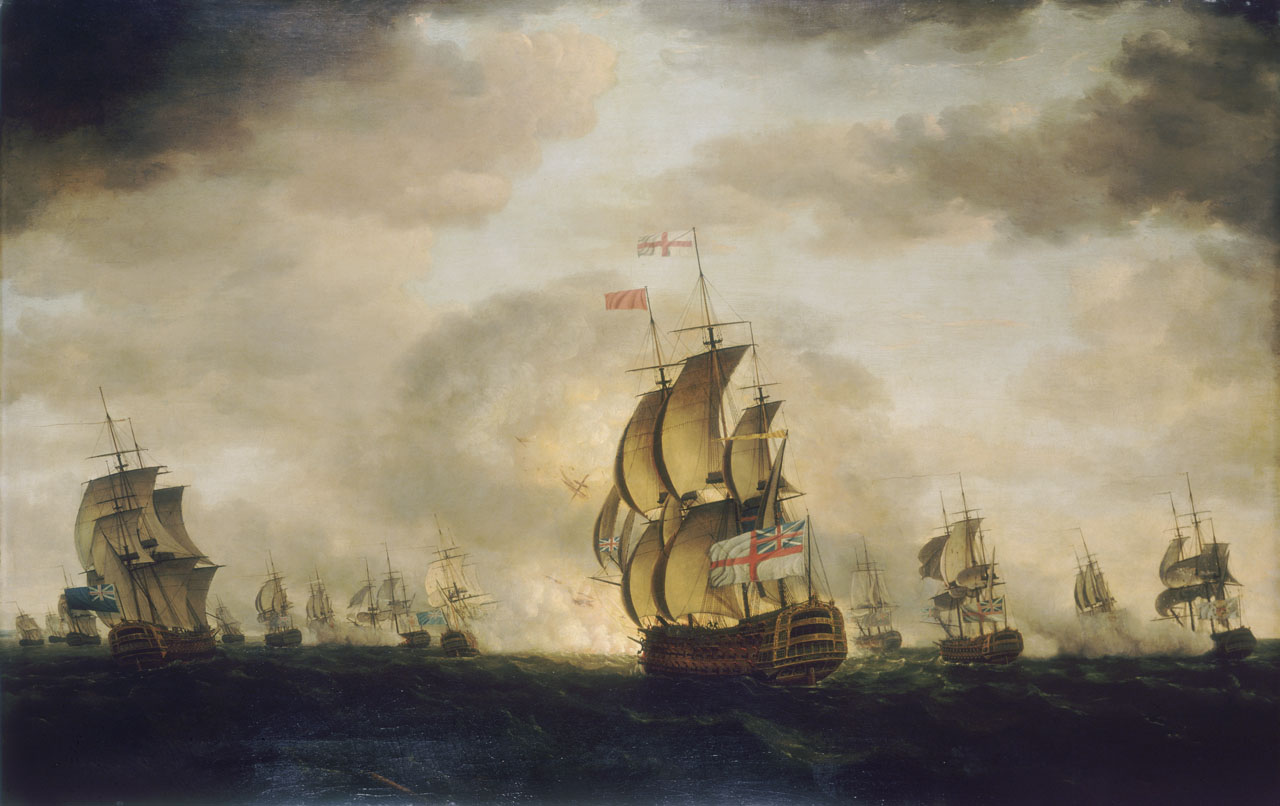
The moonlight Battle of Cape St Vincent, 16 January 1780 by Francis Holman

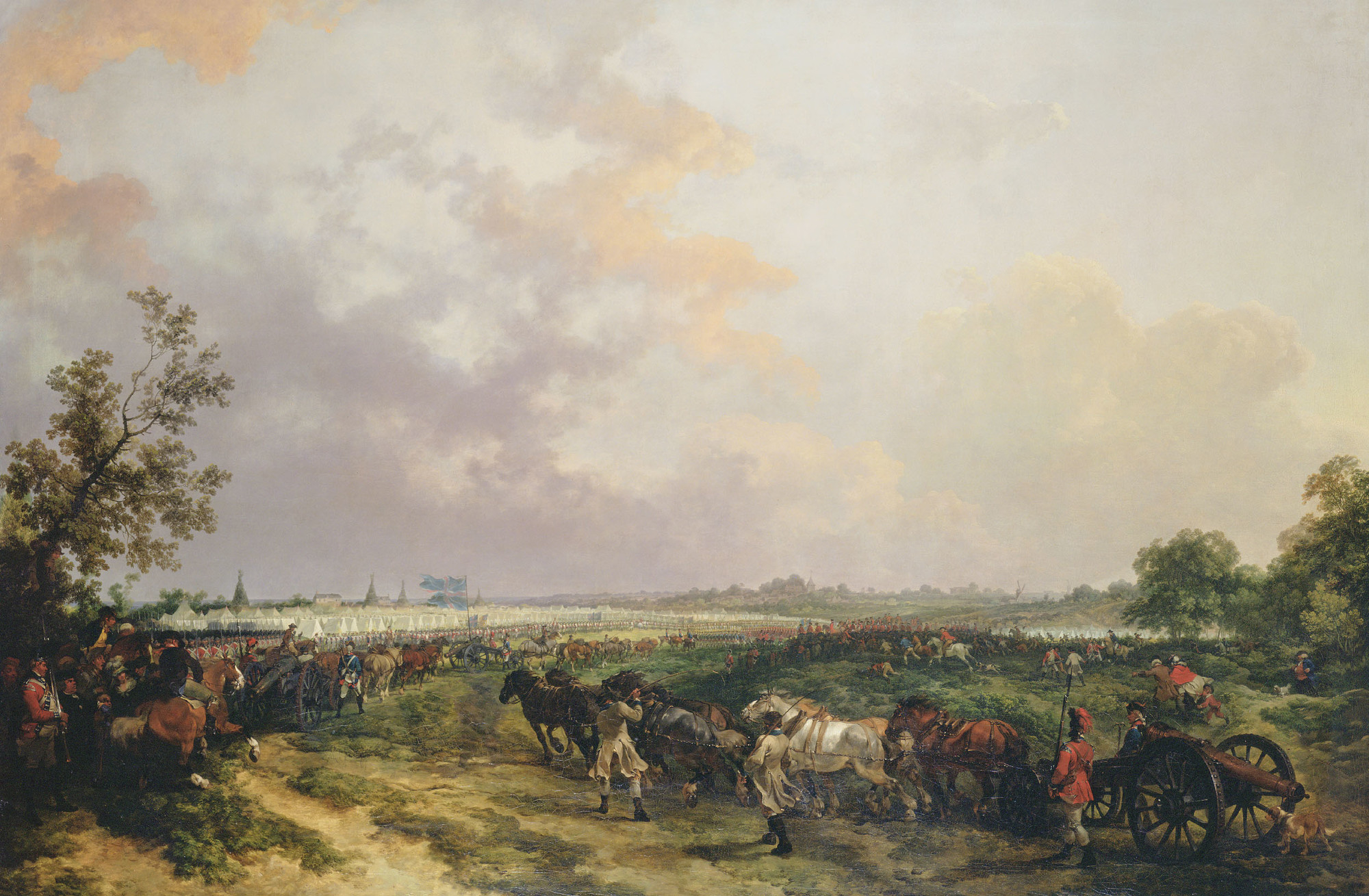
Warley Camp by Philip James de Loutherbourg

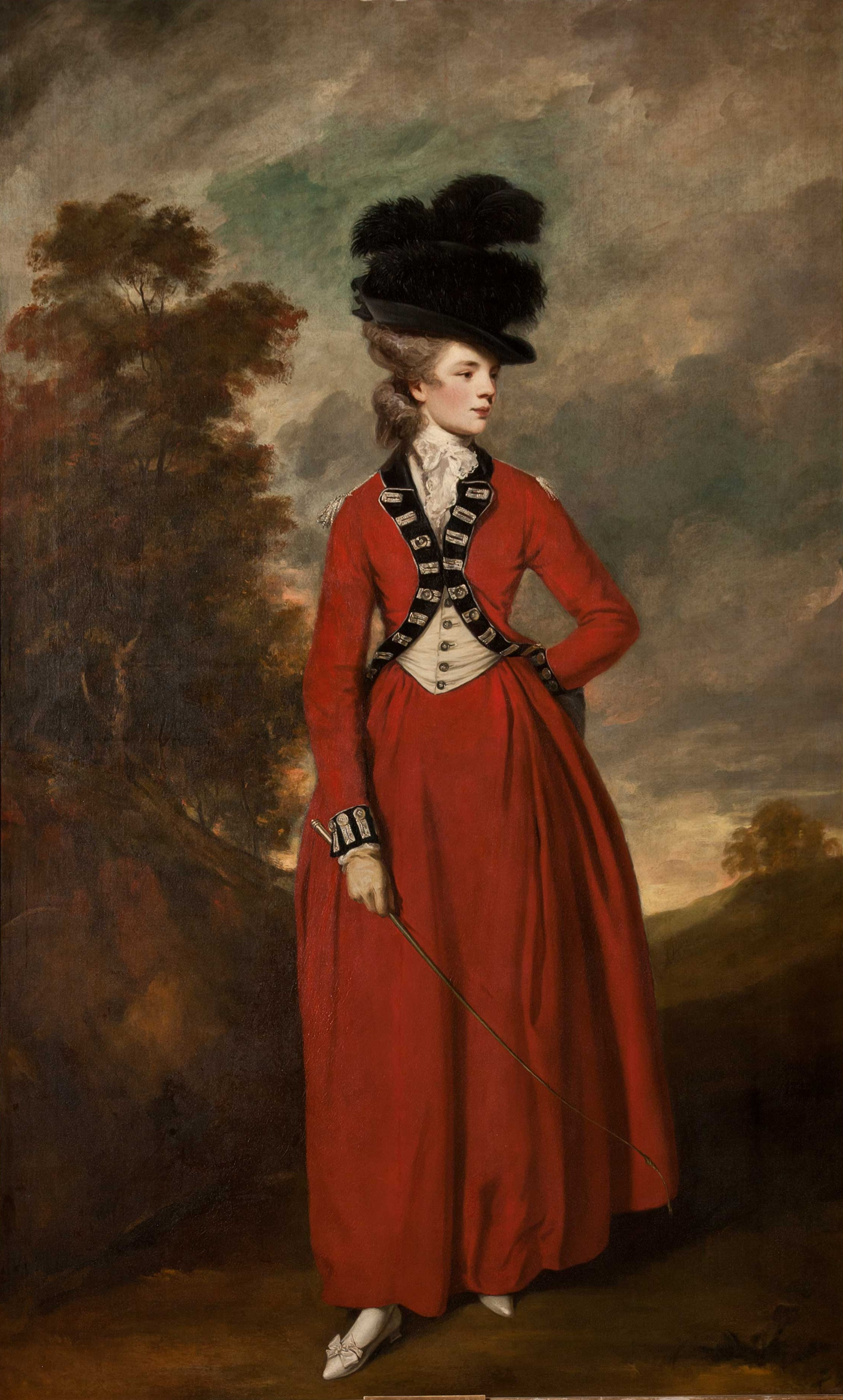
Portrait of Lady Worsley by Joshua Reynolds

Portrait of Prince William Frederick by Joshua Reynolds

Justice by Joshua Reynolds

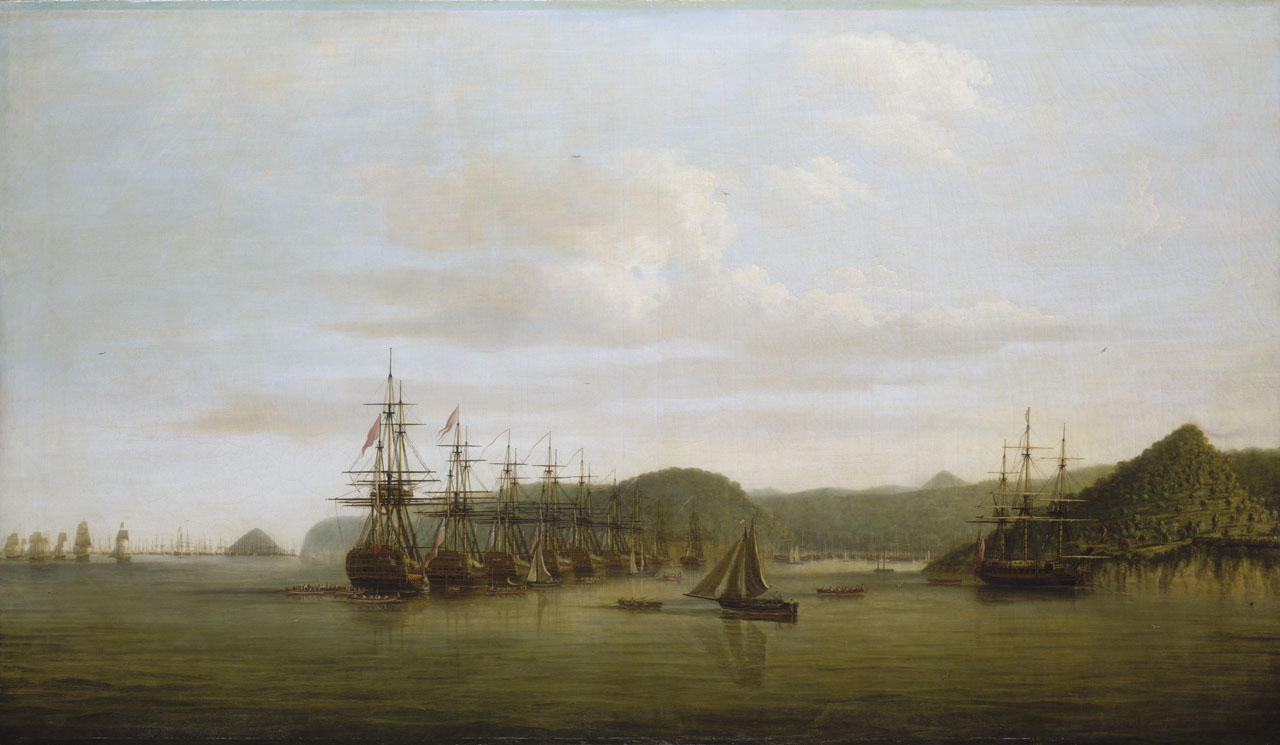
Barrington's Action at St Lucia by Dominic Serres

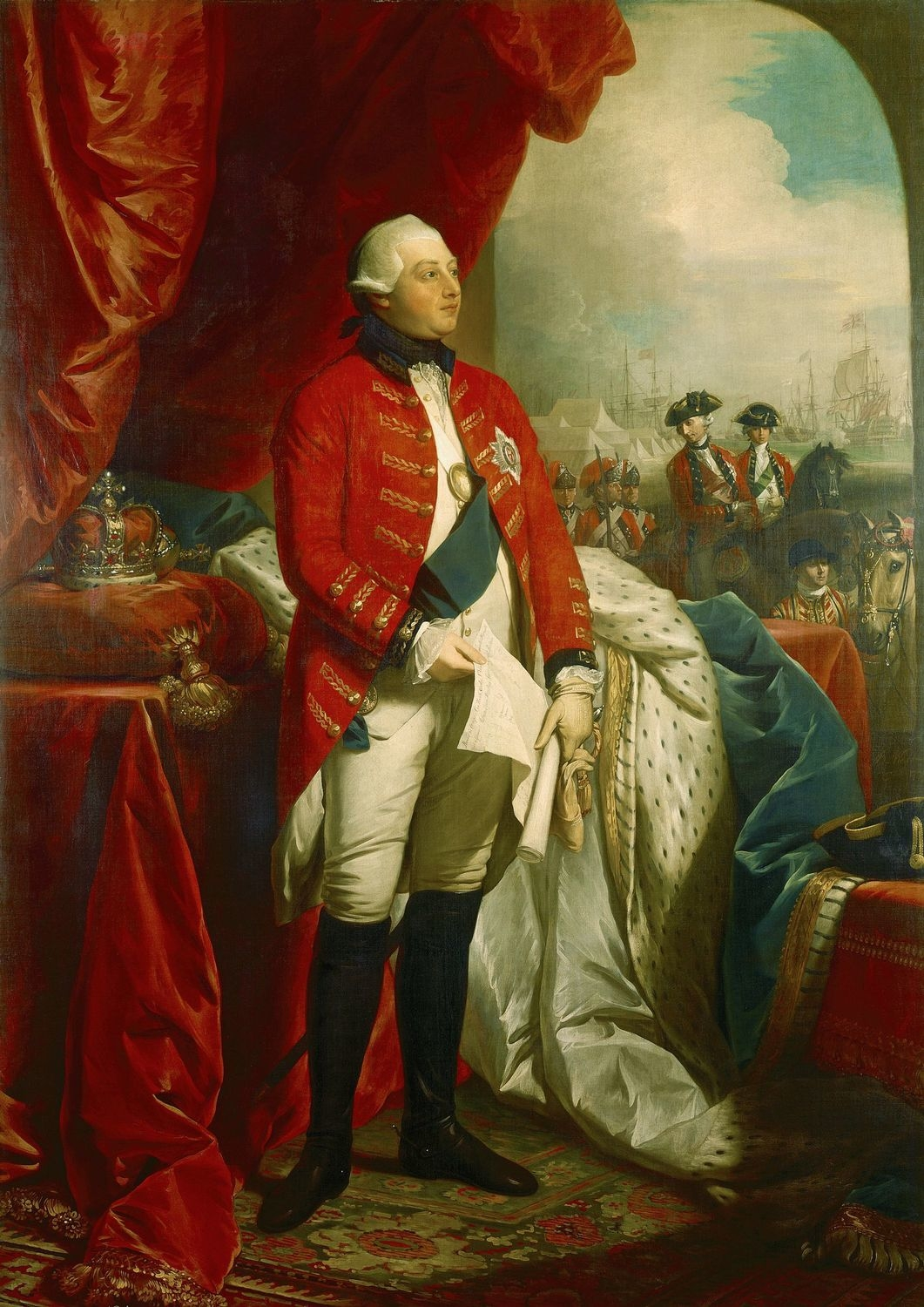
Portrait of George III by Benjamin West

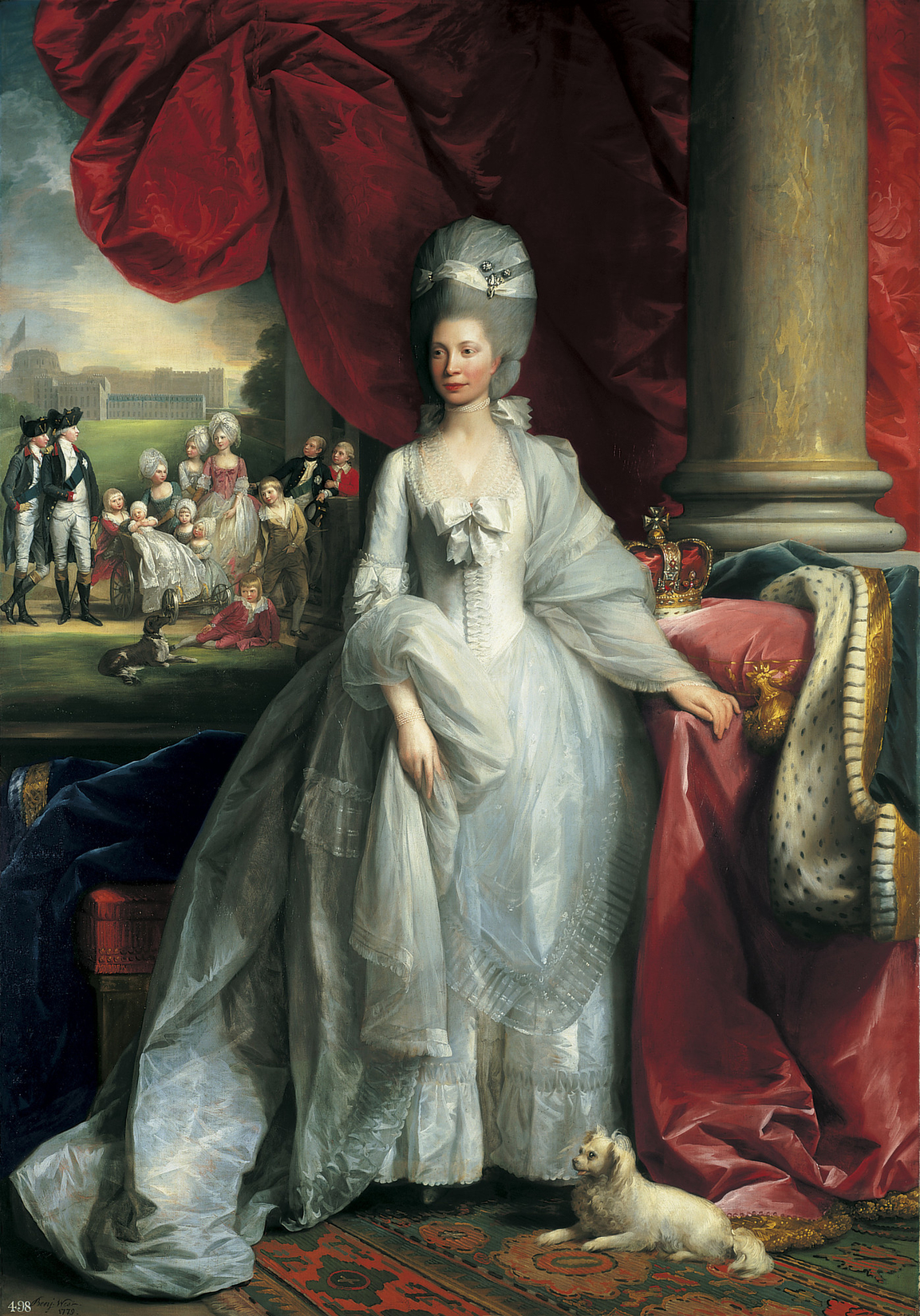
Portrait of Queen Charlotte by Benjamin West

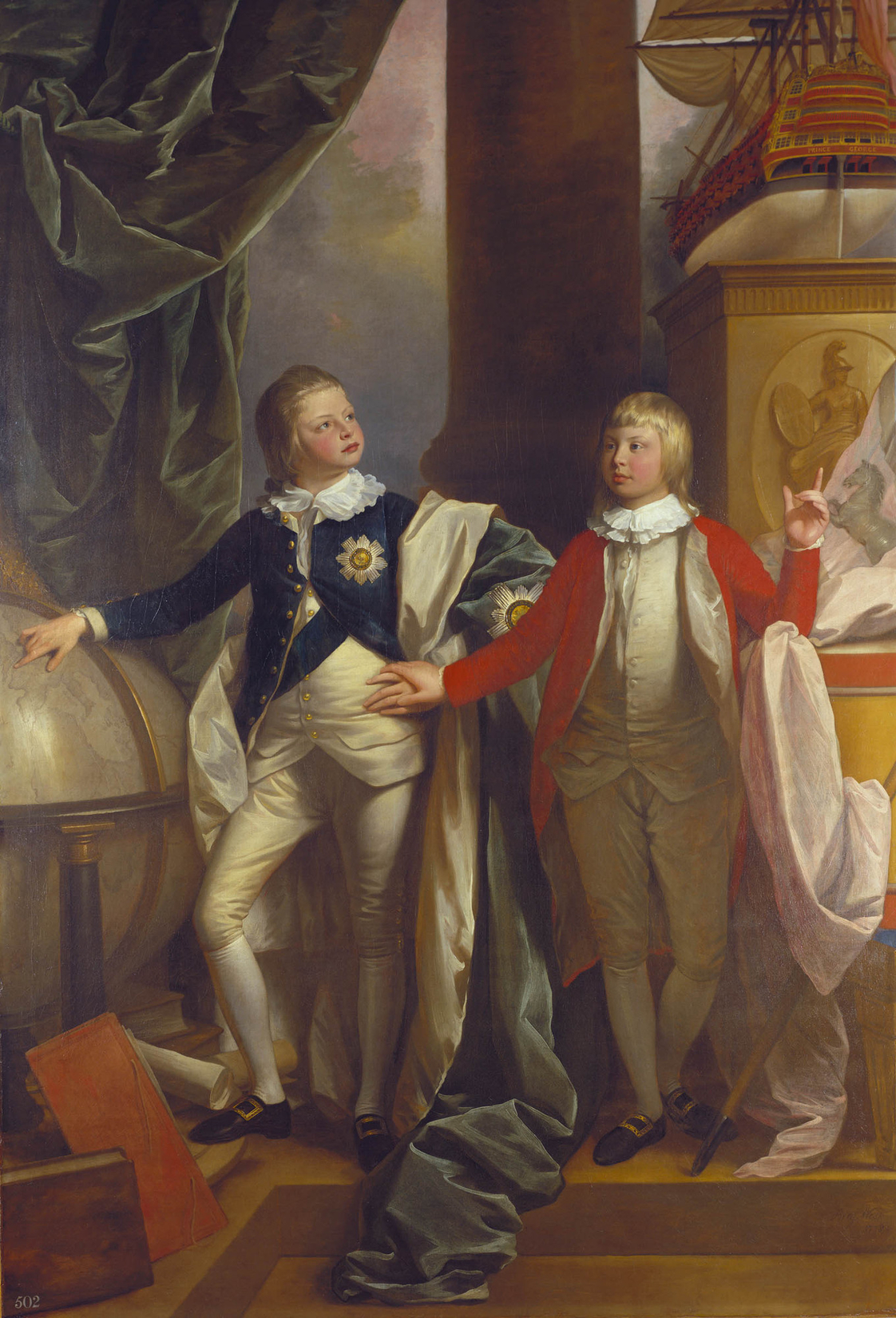
The Duke of Clarence and Duke of Kent by Benjamin West

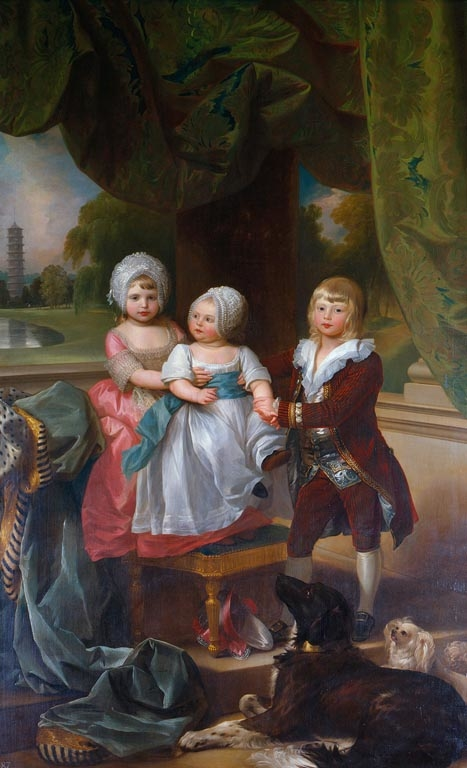
Prince Adolphus, Princess Mary and Princess Sophia by Benjamin West

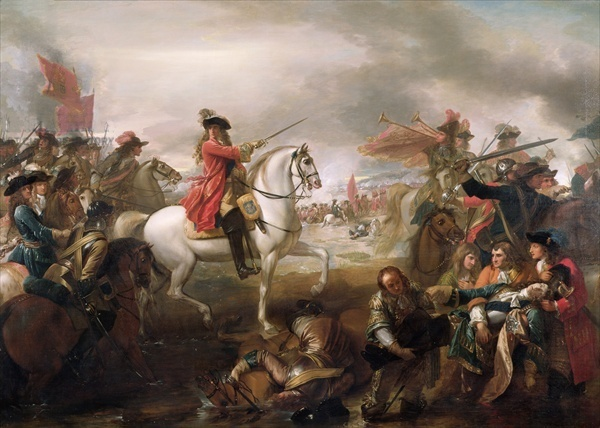
The Battle of the Boyne by Benjamin West

The Watercress Girl by Johann Zoffany

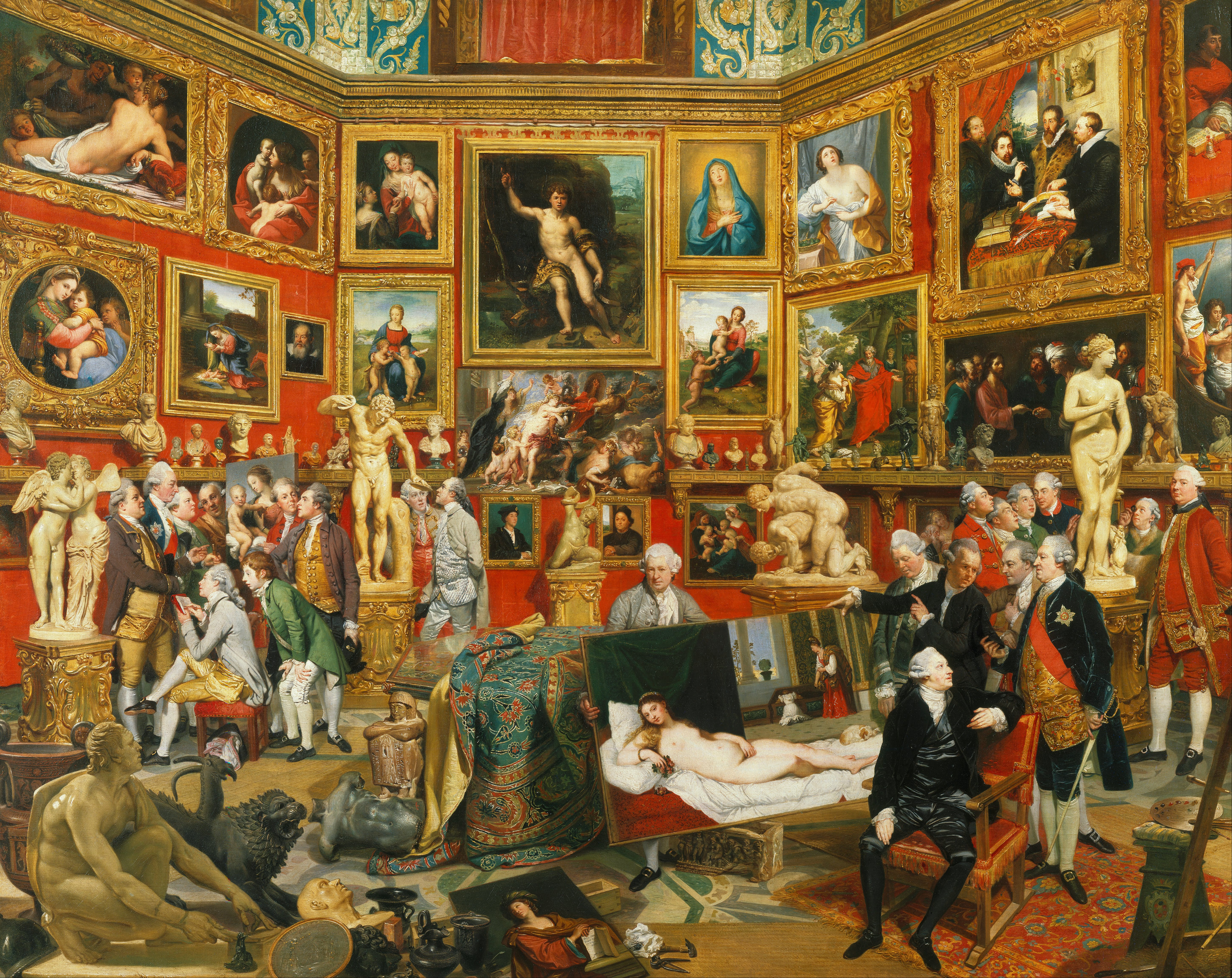
The Tribuna of the Uffizi by Johan Zoffany

== Bibliography ==
- Blunt, Anthony. The Pictures in the Collection of Her Majesty the Queen: The Later Italian Pictures. Phaidon, 1969.
- Hamilton, James. Gainsborough: A Portrait. Hachette UK, 2017.
- Kamensky, Jane. A Revolution in Color: The World of John Singleton Copley. W. W. Norton & Company, 2016.
- McCreery, Cindy. The Satirical Gaze: Prints of Women in Late Eighteenth-century England. Clarendon Press, 2004.
- McIntyre, Ian. Joshua Reynolds: The Life and Times of the First President of the Royal Academy. Allen Lane, 2003.
- Webster, Mary. Johan Zoffany, 1733-1810. National Portrait Gallery, 1976.
