= Warley Camp (painting) =

Painting by Philip James de Loutherbourg

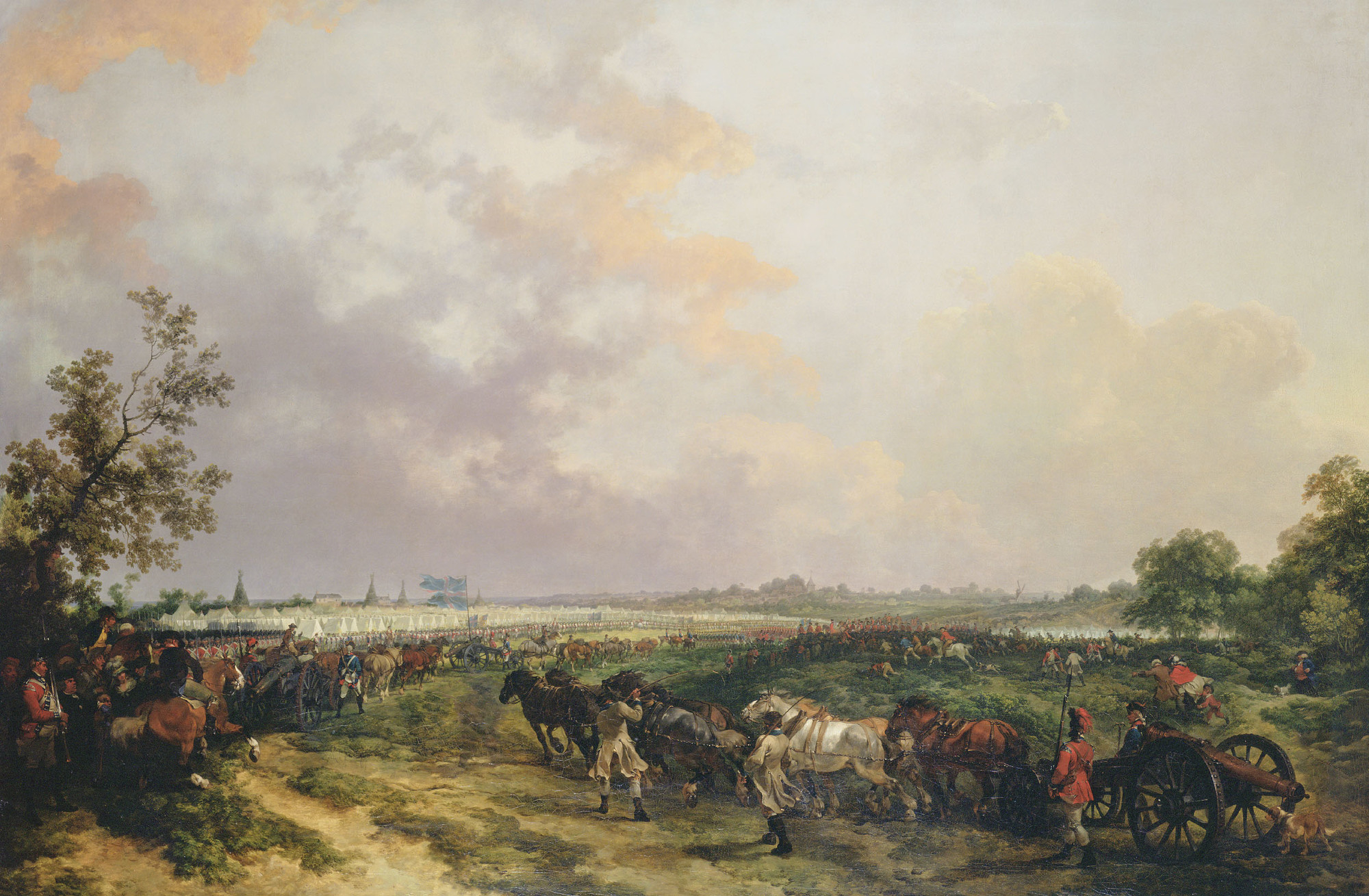
- Artist: Philip James de Loutherbourg
- Year: 1780
- Type: Oil on canvas, history painting
- Dimensions: 120 cm × 184 cm (48 in × 72.3 in)
- Location: Royal Collection

Warley Camp is an oil on canvas painting by the French-born British artist Philip James de Loutherbourg, from 1780. It is often known as Warley Camp: The Review to distinguish it from its pendant painting The Mock Attack.

== History and description ==
It depicts a scene from October 1778 when a British Army encampment took place during the American War of Independence. Following France's entry into the war,. Britain was faced with the prospect of a French Invasion. A large gathering of British troops took place at Warley Common in Essex. George III and his wife Queen Charlotte came to review the assembled troops who then took part in a military exercise. In 1804 during the Napoleonic Wars a permanent Warley Barracks was established at the location.

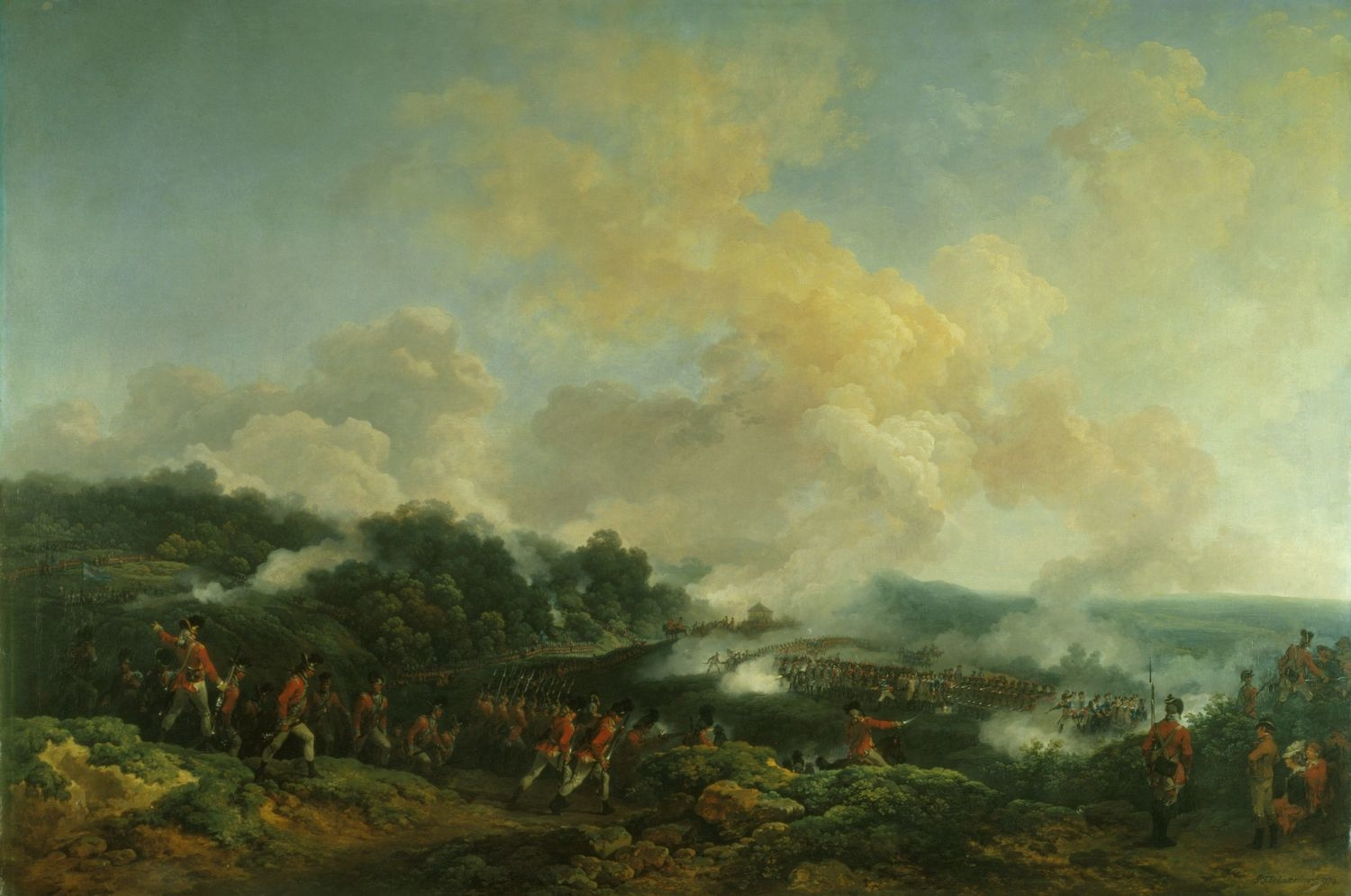
The artist also produced a companion work entitled The Mock Attack

The painter sketched a number of soldiers as preparation for the work. The paintings were commissioned by Lieutenant General Richard Pierson who commanded the troops taking part in the mock attack. He presented them both the George III as a gift. It was exhibited at the Royal Academy Exhibition of 1780 at Somerset House and was later hung by the king at Kew Palace. Today the painting remains in the Royal Collection.

== Bibliography ==
- Conway, Stephen. The British Army, 1714–1783: An Institutional History. Pen and Sword Military, 2021.
- Franklin, Carl. British Army Uniforms of the American Revolution 1751-1783. Casemate Publishers, 2012.
- Roberts, Jane. George III and Queen Charlotte: Patronage, Collecting and Court Taste. Royal Collection, 2004.
