= Self-Portrait (Reynolds) =

Painting by Joshua Reynolds

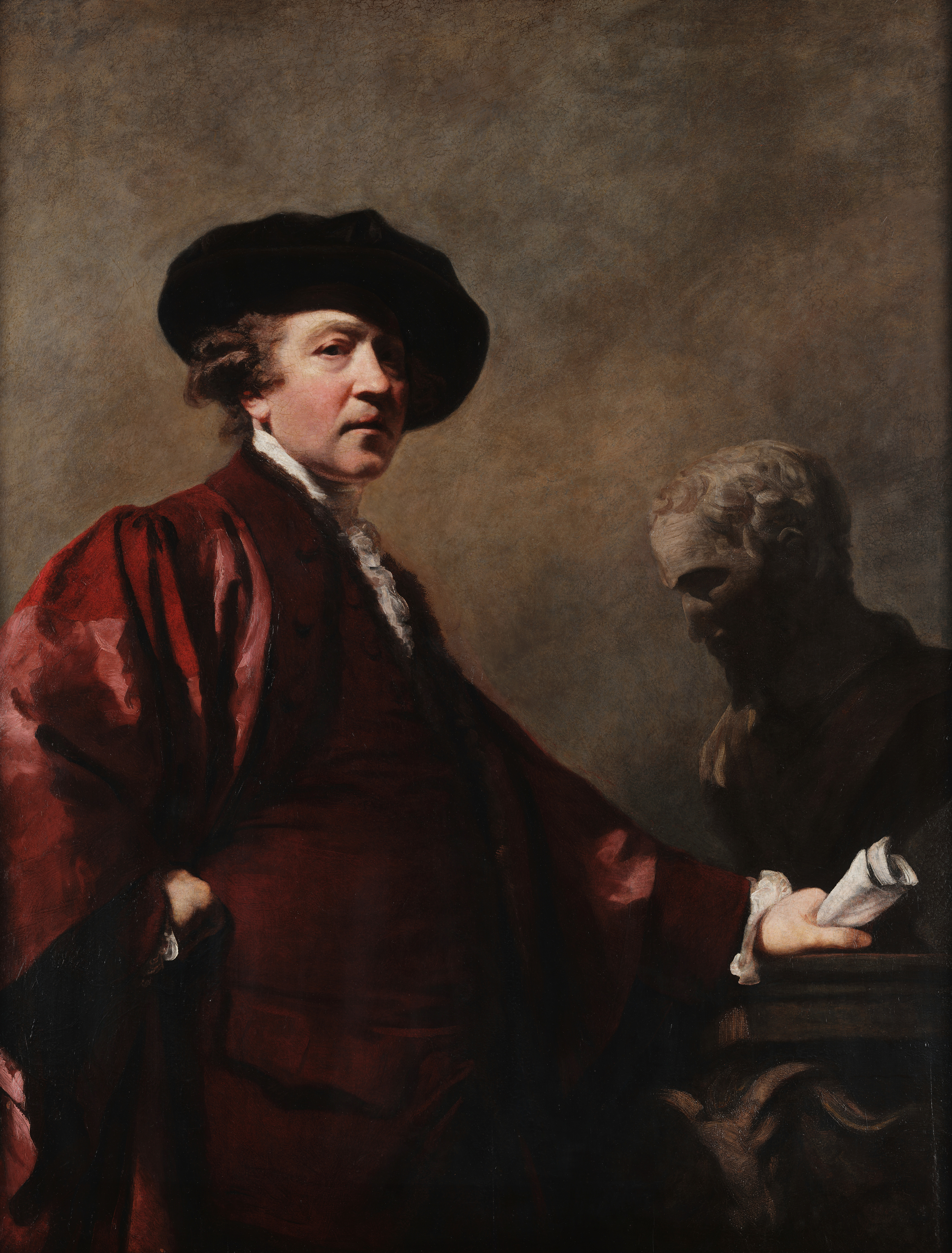
- Artist: Joshua Reynolds
- Year: 1780
- Medium: Oil on panel, portrait painting
- Dimensions: 127 cm × 101.6 cm (50 in × 40.0 in)
- Location: Royal Academy, London

Self-portrait is a 1780 oil on panel self portrait by the British artist Sir Joshua Reynolds. Reynolds was a leading portraitist and had been President of the Royal Academy since its foundation in 1768. He produced a number of self-portraits during his long career, possibly inspired by the Old Master Rembrandt whose stance he imitates in the portrait. Reynolds is shown wearing the robes of the Doctorate of Civil Law which had been bestowed on him by Oxford University in 1773. Besides him is a bust of Michelangelo by Daniele da Volterra.

The painting was produced to hang in the Academy's new assembly room at Somerset House. It was hung alongside Reynold's Portrait of Sir William Chambers which functioned as a companion piece Chambers was an influential member of the Academy and drawn up the new design for the new headquarters .

== Bibliography ==
- Cullen, Fintan. The Irish Face: Redefining the Irish Portrait. National Portrait Gallery, 2004.
- McIntyre, Ian. Joshua Reynolds: The Life and Times of the First President of the Royal Academy. Penguin Books, 2004.
- Sturgis, Alexander. Rebels and Martyrs: The Image of the Artist in the Nineteenth Century. Yale University Press, 2006.
- Wendorf, Richard. Sir Joshua Reynolds: The Painter in Society. Harvard University Press, 1998.
