= Portrait of Hugh Montgomerie =

Painting by John Singleton Copley

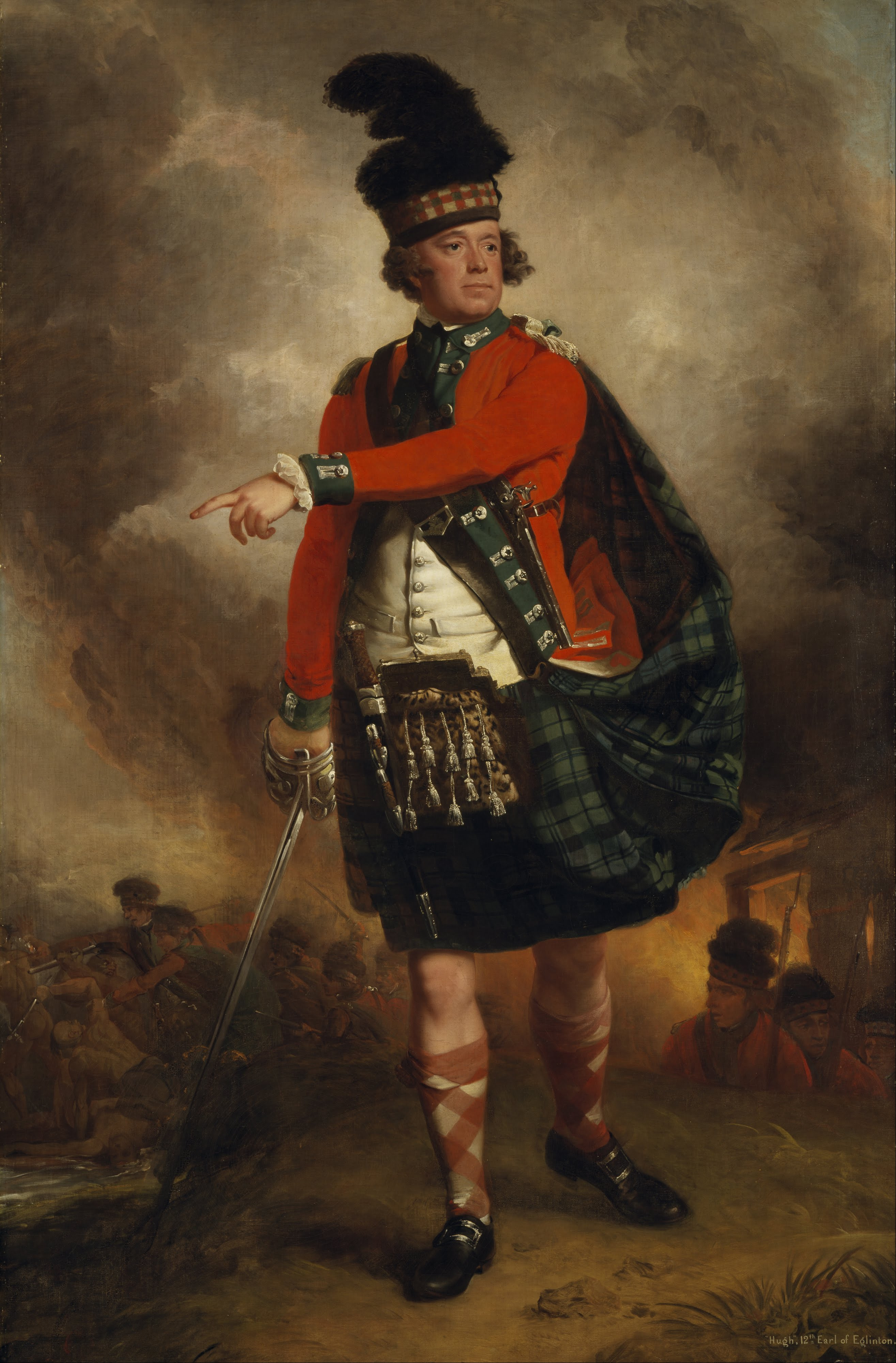
- Artist: John Singleton Copley
- Year: 1780
- Type: Oil on canvas, portrait painting
- Dimensions: 226.3 cm × 148.9 cm (89.1 in × 58.6 in)
- Location: Scottish National Gallery; Edinburgh

Portrait of Hugh Montgomerie is an oil on canvas portrait painting by the American artist John Singleton Copley, from 1780. It depicts British military officer Hugh Montgomerie, 12th Earl of Eglinton, who commissioned the work from Copley. It shows his participation in the Anglo-Cherokee War two decades earlier, with the backdrop making reference to his service during the conflict as an officer in the British Army.

The work was displayed at the Royal Academy Exhibition of 1780, the first to be held at Somerset House, in London. Today the painting is in the collection of the Scottish National Gallery, in Edinburgh, having been acquired in 1949.

== Bibliography ==
- Hoock, Holger. Empires of the Imagination: Politics, War, and the Arts in the British World, 1750–1850. Profile Books, 2010.
- Kamensky, Jane. A Revolution in Color: The World of John Singleton Copley. W. W. Norton & Company, 2016.
- Prown, Jules David. John Singleton Copley: In England, 1774-1815. National Gallery of Art, Washington, 1966.
- Tobin, Beth Fowkes. Picturing Imperial Power: Colonial Subjects in Eighteenth-century British Painting. Duke University Press, 1999.
