= Portrait of Sir William Chambers =

Painting by Joshua Reynolds

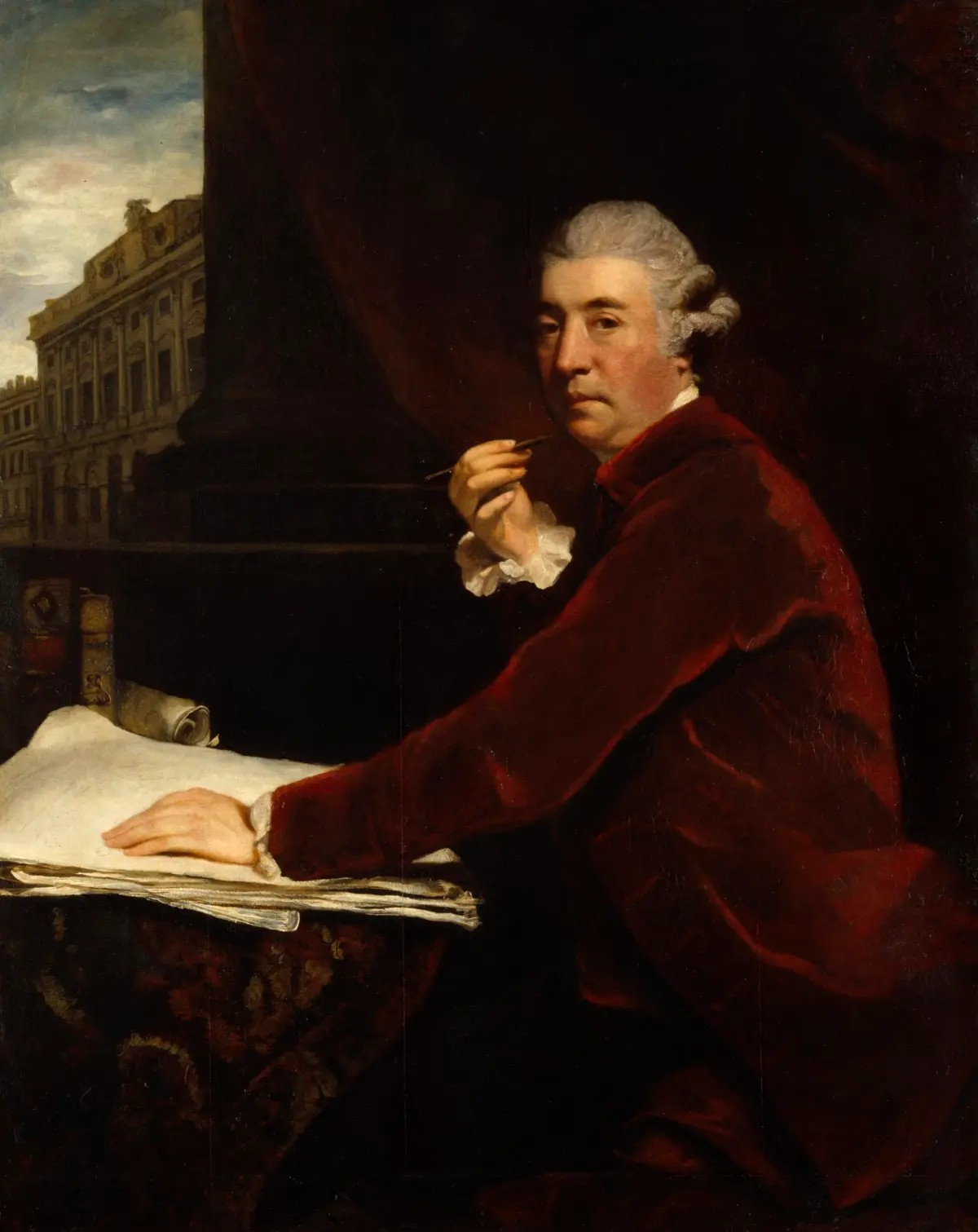
- Artist: Joshua Reynolds
- Year: 1780
- Type: Oil on canvas, portrait
- Dimensions: 129 cm × 103.2 cm (51 in × 40.6 in)
- Location: Royal Academy, London

Portrait of Sir William Chambers is a 1780 portrait painting by the British artist Joshua Reynolds depicting the architect William Chambers. Reynolds was the first president of the Royal Academy. The Royal Academy had recently moved into new headquarters at Somerset House on the Strand in London. Chambers, also a prominent member of the Academy, had designed the new building. Reynolds portrays him with a porte crayon in his hand, against the backdrop of Somerset House.

It is likely the painting was produced as a pendant to hang alongside the Self-Portrait by Reynolds in the Assembly Room at Somerset House. The engraver Valentine Green produced a mezzotint based on the painting, a copy of which is now in the National Portrait Gallery.

== Bibliography ==
- Harris, John. Sir William Chambers: Architect to George III. Yale University Press, 1996.
- McIntyre, Ian. Joshua Reynolds: The Life and Times of the First President of the Royal Academy. Allen Lane, 2003.
- Postle, Edward (ed.) Joshua Reynolds: The Creation of Celebrity. Harry N. Abrams, 2005.
- Wendorf, Richard. Sir Joshua Reynolds: The Painter in Society. Harvard University Press, 1998.
