= Christ Crucified (Goya) =

Painting by Francisco de Goya

- Cristo crucificado (Spanish)
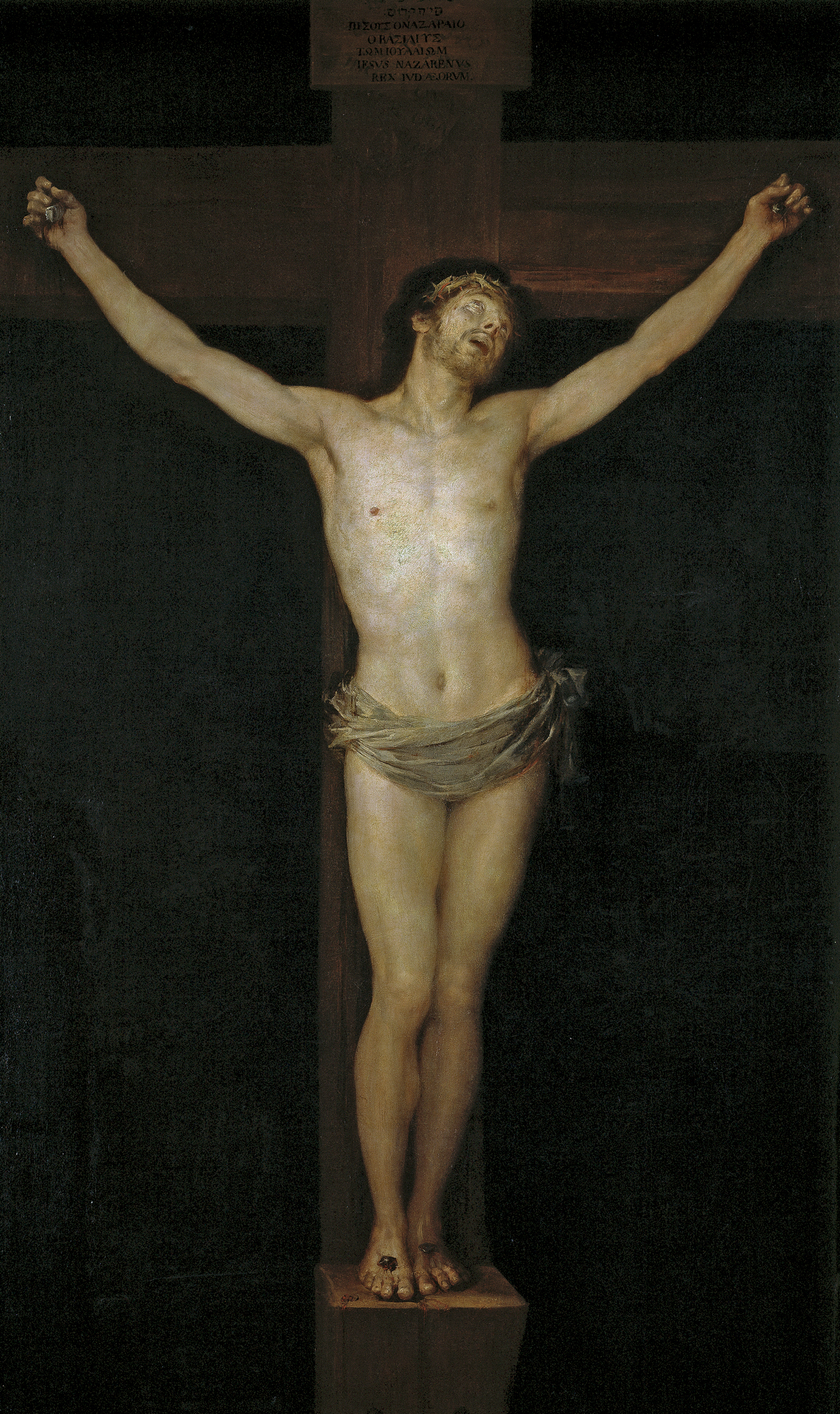
- Artist: Francisco de Goya
- Year: 1780
- Medium: Oil on canvas
- Dimensions: 255 cm × 154 cm (100 in × 61 in)
- Location: Museo del Prado, Madrid

Christ Crucified (Spanish: Cristo crucificado) is a 1780 oil-on-canvas painting of the crucifixion of Jesus by Spanish Romantic painter Francisco de Goya. He presented it to the Real Academia de Bellas Artes de San Fernando as his reception piece as an academic painter. It now forms part of the collection of the Prado Museum, in Madrid.

== Analysis ==
The painting is neoclassical in style, though rooted in traditional Spanish iconography of the subject and related to the treatment of the same topic by Velázquez (even borrowing its dark black background with no landscape) and Anton Raphael Mengs (borrowing his presentation of the right leg pushed forwards). Goya conforms to the Spanish Baroque iconographic rules for portraying the Crucifixion as laid down by Francisco Pacheco – the black background, four rather than three nails, supported feet and a trilingual inscription at the top of the cross beginning IESUS NAZARENUS REX IUDEORUM. By obeying these rules Goya diminished the emphasis on devotional features such as drama and the presence of blood in order to concentrate attention on the painting's soft modelling, since his intention was to please the academicians then dominated by Mengs' neoclassicism.

Painted with loose and vibrant brushwork, Christ's head is lifted and leaning to the left, dramatically looking upwards, possibly in a representation of a gesture of ecstasy as he said "My God, my God, why have you forsaken me?" (Matthew 27:46, Mark 15:34), though the serenity of the painting as a whole avoids a pitiful sensation.

With this work Goya also aimed to show the academicians his work in one of the most difficult areas he could – his knowledge of anatomy – by submitting a nude, justified by its presentation in a religious guise that conformed with Spanish tradition. Goya cleverly resolves the difficulty of soft modelling in sfumato as well as the light source (which seems to come from Christ's bared breast) and its transition into the dark areas, hiding the outlines of his underdrawing. Transparent areas, glazes and gradations are treated with delicacy in shades of pearl gray and soft green-blue, and touches of intense white enhance the flashes of light. The lines of the composition conform to the sweet classical S, dispensing with the violent effects of the Baroque. The pushed-forward right leg, slightly skewed hip and the tilt of the head give the work dynamic adjustment as demanded by the classical canons to avoid stiffness.

== History ==
As much as his contemporaries admired the painting, it fell out of fashion in the 20th century, when critics preferred to see Goya as a Romantic painter with little or no Catholic faith who paid scant attention to academic or religious painting. However, postmodernism has assessed Goya and his work as a whole, in all its facets, and has taken into account that this is a work in which Goya was still striving for professional prestige.

== See also ==
- List of works by Francisco Goya
