= Hugh Montgomerie, 12th Earl of Eglinton =

British politician, military officer and composer

The Right Honourable The Earl of Eglinton KT
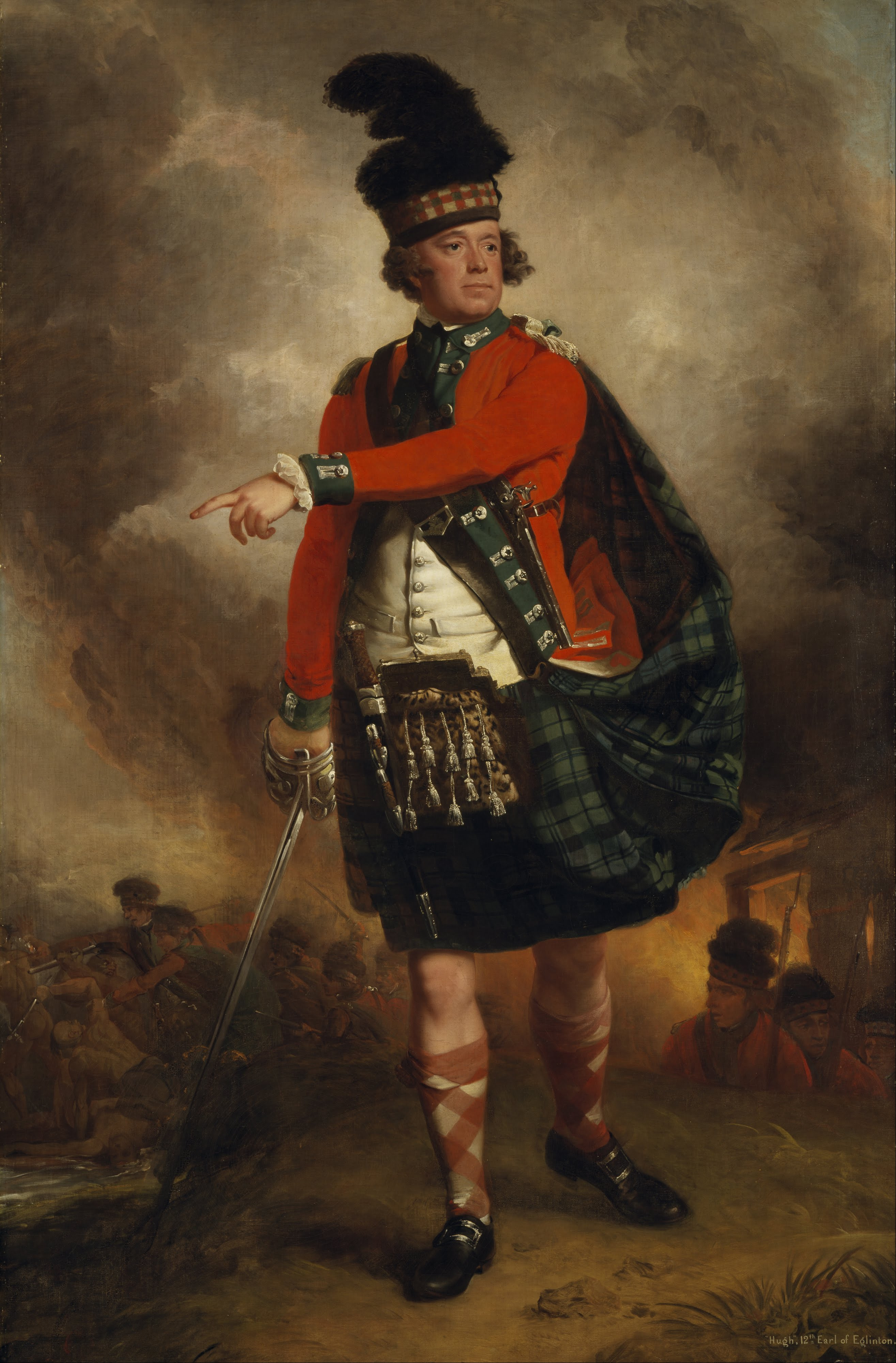
- Portrait of Hugh Montgomerie; John Singleton Copley, c. 1780

Member of Parliament for Ayrshire
- In office 1796–1796
- Preceded by: Sir Adam Fergusson, Bt
- Succeeded by: William Fullarton
- In office 1784–1798
- Preceded by: Sir Adam Fergusson, Bt
- Succeeded by: William McDowall
- In office 1780–1781
- Preceded by: Sir Adam Fergusson, Bt
- Succeeded by: Sir Adam Fergusson, Bt

Personal details
- Born: Hugh Montgomerie; 5 November 1739
- Died: 14 December 1819 (aged 80)
- Spouse: Eleanora Hamilton (m. 1772; died 1817)
- Relations: Archibald Montgomerie, 13th Earl of Eglinton (grandson)
- Children: 4
- Parent(s): Alexander Montgomerie; Lillias Montgomery

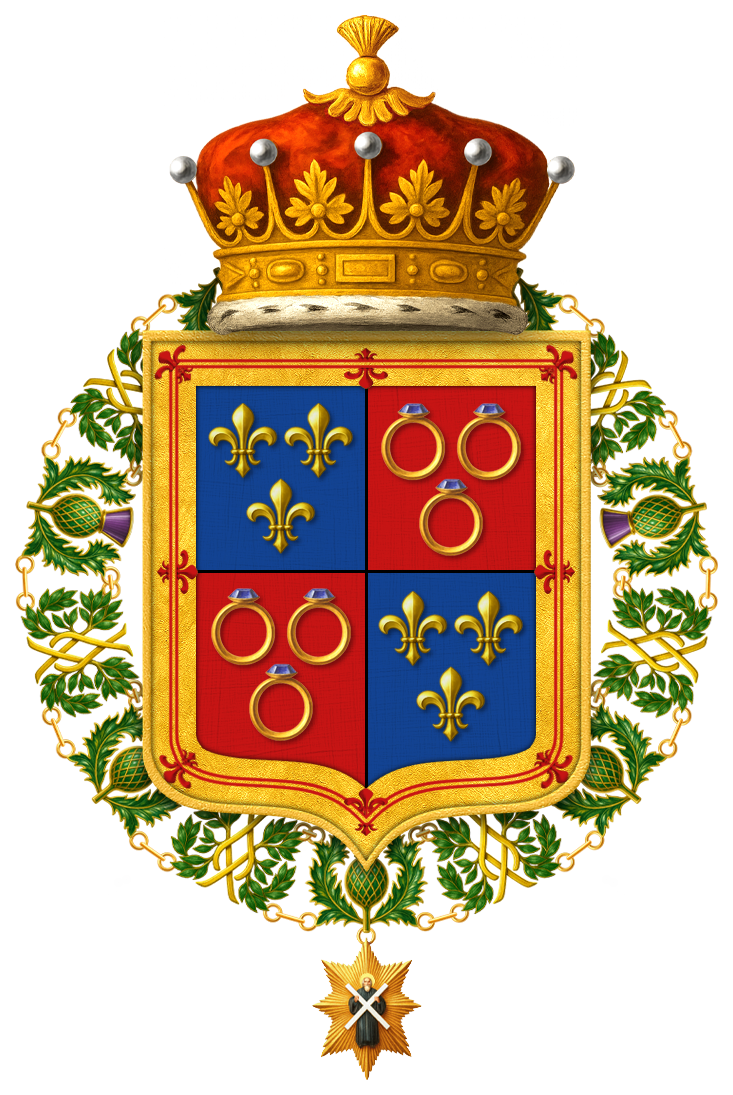
Shield of Arms of Hugh Montgomerie, 12th Earl of Eglinton, KT, encircled by the collar of the Order of the Thistle

Colonel Hugh Montgomerie, 12th Earl of Eglinton, KT (5 November 1739 – 14 December 1819), styled Lord Montgomerie from 1769 to 1796, (Note: Also known as Hugh Montgomerie of Coilsfield) was a British politician, military officer and composer.

== Early life ==
Montgomerie was born on 5 November 1739. He was the son of Alexander Montgomerie (d. 1783) and Lillias Montgomery (1715–1783). Among his siblings were Lillias Montgomerie (wife of John Hamilton of Sundrum), Frances Montgomerie (wife of James Ritchie of Busbie and Craigton), Alexander Montgomerie (who married Elizabeth Taylor), Archibald Montgomerie (who married Marie Chantrey), Lt.-Gen. James Montgomerie (who married Harriet Elizabeth Jackson).

His paternal grandparents were Hugh Montgomerie (a grandson of the 6th Earl of Eglinton) and Katherine (née Arbuckle), widow of John Hamilton of Letham. His paternal grandparents were Sir Robert Montgomery, 5th Baronet and the former Frances Stirling (eldest daughter of Col. Francis Stirling).

== Career ==
He sat as a Member of Parliament for Ayrshire off and on from 1780 to 1796. That year he became Lord Lieutenant of Ayrshire, a post he held until his death. In 1794 he raised a fencible regiment, the West Lowland Fencibles of which he was colonel.

In 1798, having previously succeeded to the earldom through his third cousin, (Note: While the title passed to Hugh Montgomerie, the majority of the 11th Earl of Eglinton's wealth passed to his daughter, Lady Mary Montgomerie, who later married the 12th Earl's eldest son, keeping the title and wealth of the family intact.) he was elected a Scottish representative peer and moved to the House of Lords. On 15 February 1806, he was created Baron Ardrossan in the Peerage of the United Kingdom, enabling him to sit the Lords in his own right. He was made a Knight of the Thistle in 1814.

As large ships were unable to reach Glasgow due to the silting of the River Clyde, Montgomerie promoted and partially funded the Glasgow, Paisley and Ardrossan Canal. However, funds ran out, and the canal was only constructed from Glasgow to Johnstone via Paisley. The Glasgow terminus of the canal was at Port Eglinton. Though the wharf is now filled in, the neighbouring Eglinton Street still bears his name. Preparatory work on the canal from the new harbour created at Ardrossan was used as the basis for Glasgow Street, which is the main thoroughfare of the town.

In 1807, Montgomerie funded the lifeboat for Ardrossan harbour, operated by the Ardrossan Lifeboat Society between 1807 and c.1847.

Montgomerie was an amateur composer and cellist. His best-known work is the dance tune "Ayrshire Lasses," and other composers dedicated works to him, including Thomas Arne.

== Personal life ==
In c. 3 June 1772, Montgomerie married Eleanora Hamilton (c. 1742–1817), daughter of Robert Hamilton of Bourtreehill (the son of Hugh Hamilton of Clongall) and Jean Mitchell. Among her siblings were Jean Hamilton, who married George Lindsay-Crawford, 21st Earl of Crawford. (Note: Eleanora's niece, Lady Jean "Jane" Lindsay (daughter of Jean Hamilton and the 21st Earl of Crawford) married Archibald Montgomerie, 11th Earl of Eglinton. Upon her death in 1778, without issue, the 11th Earl of Eglinton married Frances Twysden (a daughter of Sir William Twysden, 6th Baronet), with whom he had Lady Mary Montgomerie who married Archibald Montgomerie, Lord Montgomerie (the eldest son of Eleanora Hamilton and the 12th Earl of Eglinton). The 11th Earl and Frances Twysden divorced in 1788, however, on account on her affair with Douglas Hamilton, 8th Duke of Hamilton.) Together, they had two sons, and two daughters:

- Hon. Archibald Montgomerie (1773–1814), styled Lord Montgomerie; a Maj.-Gen. in the British Army; he married Lady Mary Montgomerie, daughter of Gen. Archibald Montgomerie, 11th Earl of Eglinton and, his second wife, Frances Twysden (a daughter of Sir William Twysden, 6th Baronet), in 1803. After his death, she married Sir Charles Lamb, 2nd Baronet.
- Hon. Roger Montgomerie (d. 1799), an officer in the Royal Navy who died at Port Royal, Jamaica.
- Lady Jane Montgomerie (d. 1860), who married her cousin, Capt. Archibald Hamilton, son of John Hamilton of Sundrum and Lillias Montgomerie, in 1828.
- Lady Lilias Montgomerie (d. 1845), who married Robert Dundas MacQueen of Braxfield in 1796. After his death, she married Richard Alexander Oswald, son of George Oswald of Scotstoun, in 1817.

Lady Eglinton died on 18 January 1817. Lord Eglinton died on 14 December 1819. As his eldest son predeceased him, he was succeeded in his titles by his grandson, Archibald Montgomerie.

== Notes ==
Parliament of Great Britain
Preceded by Sir Adam Fergusson, Bt	Member of Parliament for Ayrshire; 1780–1781	Succeeded by Sir Adam Fergusson, Bt
Preceded by Sir Adam Fergusson, Bt	Member of Parliament for Ayrshire; 1784–1789	Succeeded by William McDowall
Preceded by Sir Adam Fergusson, Bt	Member of Parliament for Ayrshire; 1796	Succeeded by William Fullarton
Honorary titles
Preceded by The Earl of Eglinton	Lord Lieutenant of Ayrshire; 1796–1819	Succeeded by The Earl of Glasgow
Peerage of the United Kingdom
New creation	Baron Ardrossan; 1806–1819	Succeeded by Archibald Montgomerie
Peerage of Scotland
Preceded by Archibald Montgomerie	Earl of Eglinton; 1796–1819	Succeeded by Archibald Montgomerie
