= Gaspare Bazzani =

Italian painter (1701–1780)

Gaspare Bazzani (21 April 1701 – 6 May 1780) was an Italian painter active in Reggio Emilia as a painter of vedute or landscapes, as well as a scenic designer. His parents were Prospero Bazzani and Domenica Bruni.

== Heritage ==
He claimed a professional lineage from the Galli Bibiena family, whose scenographic tradition strongly influenced his decorative and theatrical work.

He often designed sets during 1750–1760s for the Teatro di Reggio in collaboration with Tarabusi. Bazzani was utilized for paintings to celebrate the marriage of the granddaughter of the Duke Francesco III, the Princess Maria Beatrice d'Este with the Archduke Ferdinand of Austria in the Ducal Palace of Milan. Bazzani, along with Fra Stefano da Carpi for figure painting, was also employed by Duke Ercole II to paint the Casa di Campagna near Santa Maria di Mugnano, outside Modena. Bazzani and Giuseppe Davolio traveled to Genoa to paint the Oratorio of San Filippo Neri. In Parma, Bazzani painted for the presbytery and choir of San Vitale, the ceiling of the refectory of San Sepolcro. He also painted in Bologna, Siena, and Ferrara.
