= Welin =

Swedish surname

Welin is a surname that may refer to:

- Anna Welin (born 1994), Swedish footballer
- Axel Welin (1862–1951), Swedish inventor
  - Welin breech block, design for locking artillery breeches invented by Axel Welin
- Gustaf Welin (1930–2008), Swedish Army lieutenant general
- Johanna Welin (born 1984), Swedish-born German wheelchair basketball player
- Karl-Erik Welin (1934–1992), Swedish pianist and composer

== See also ==
- Welin (village), Walloon name of the village/municipality of Wellin, Belgium
