= Portrait of Queen Charlotte (West) =

Painting by Benjamin West

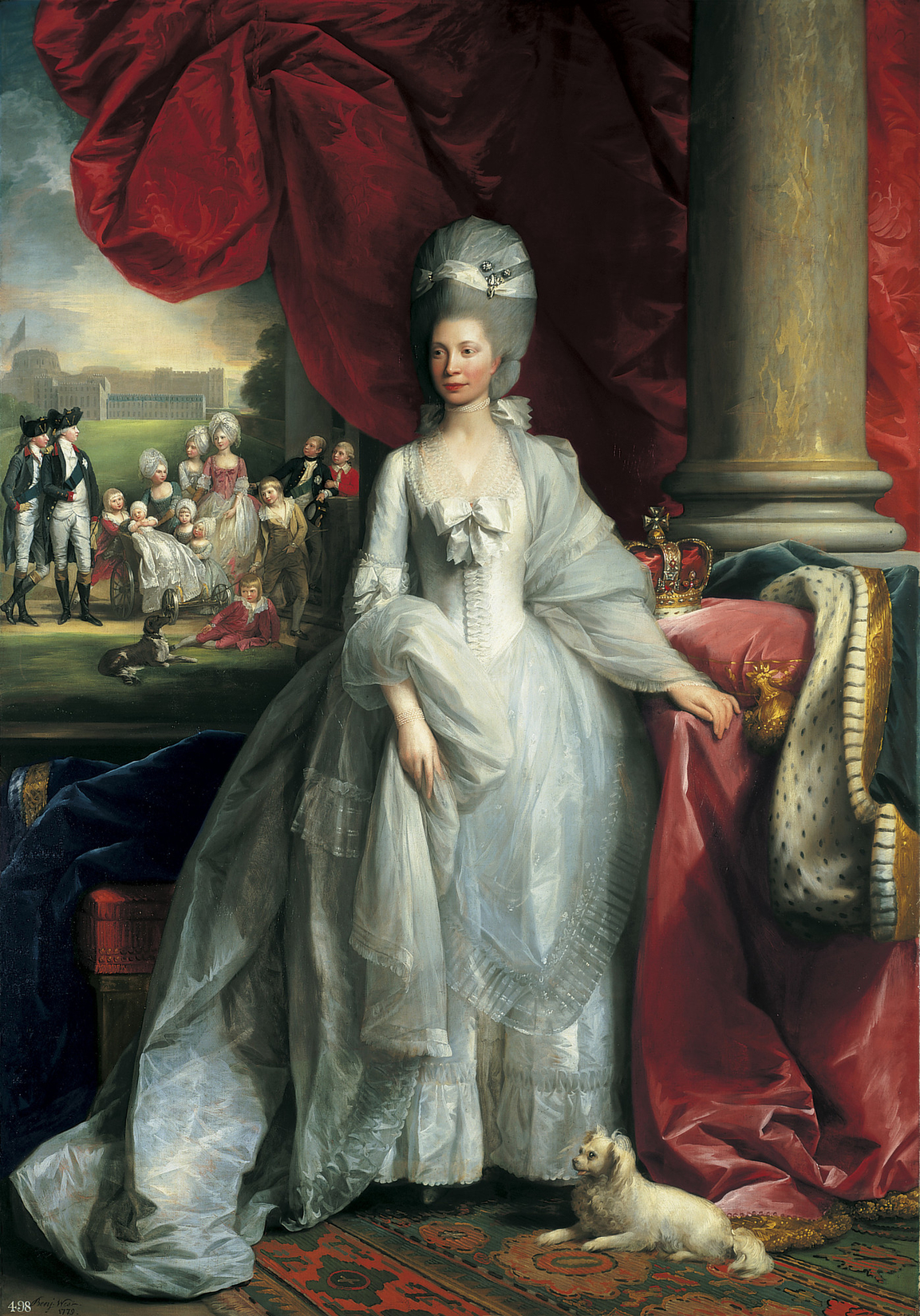
- Artist: Benjamin West
- Year: 1779
- Type: Oil on canvas, portrait painting
- Dimensions: 256.7 cm × 181.6 cm (101.1 in × 71.5 in)
- Location: Buckingham Palace; London

Portrait of Queen Charlotte is a 1779 portrait painting by the Anglo-American artist Benjamin West. It depicts the German-born British Charlotte of Mecklenburg-Strelitz, the queen consort of Britain. It was part of pair of portraits commissioned by the royal family featuring Charlotte and her husband George III. Behind the queen are thirteen of her children (two more would be born after the painting) including the Prince of Wales and Duke of York on the left in Windsor uniform and the Duke of Clarence on the right in the uniform of a midshipman in the Royal Navy. In the background is the south front of Windsor Castle with Queen's Lodge which was later demolished during the Regency era. The painting was displayed at the Royal Academy Exhibition of 1780, the first to take place at Somerset House. It remains part of the Royal Collection and hangs in the East Gallery of Buckingham Palace.

== Bibliography ==
- Brown, Jane. Lancelot 'Capability' Brown: The Omnipotent Magician, 1716-1783. Random House, 2012.
- Garrett, Natalee. Queen Charlotte: Family, Duty, Scandal. Taylor & Francis, 2024.
- Grossman, Lloyd. Benjamin West and the Struggle to be Modern. Merrell Publishers, 2015.
- Roberts, Jane. Royal Landscape: The Gardens and Parks of Windsor. Yale University Press, 1997.
