= The Battle of the Boyne (painting) =

Painting by Benjamin West

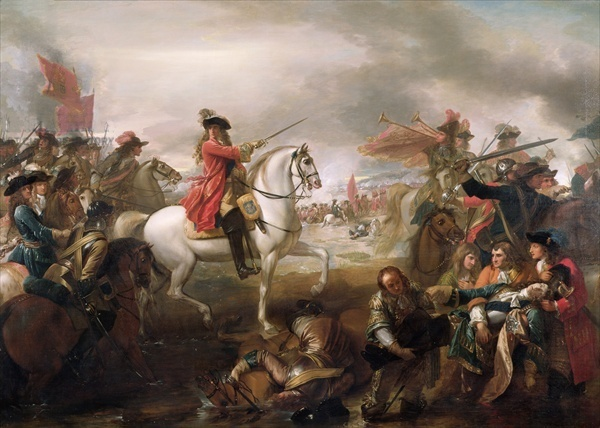
- Artist: Benjamin West
- Year: 1778, prints after 1781
- Type: Oil on canvas, historical painting
- Location: Eaton Hall, Eccleston, Cheshire

The Battle of the Boyne is a 1778 historical painting by the Anglo-American artist Benjamin West. It portrays the Battle of the Boyne which took place in Ireland in 1690. West's depiction of William of Orange on his white horse became the iconic image of the Williamite victory; the painting was widely copied and distributed throughout the nineteenth century. It was displayed at the Royal Academy Exhibition of 1780. The original is now part of the Duke of Westminster's private collection at Eaton Hall, Cheshire.

== West and Historicism ==
West became a celebrated figure for his 1770 work The Death of General Wolfe, commissioned by Richard, 1st Earl Grosvenor, which portrayed James Wolfe's death during the fight for Quebec in 1759. His historical paintings brought him to national attention and he became a leading member of the Royal Academy. West was influenced by neoclassicism and attempted to portray scenes that drew an emotional response, rather than being historically accurate. As a "history painter," he was more concerned with the epic rendition of the narrative rather than with its possible accuracy.

In 1778, Richard Grosvenor also commissioned "The Battle of the Boyne" painting, which portrays the fighting at the Boyne, part of the Williamite War in Ireland (1689–91). The battle was a decisive victory for the Williamites over James II's Jacobite Irish Army, leading to the capture of the Irish capital city Dublin. By the time West made the painting, the Boyne had come to occupy an important position in Irish Protestant culture. The dominant image of the painting is William of Orange crossing the River Boyne. West's portrayal of the King became influential on subsequent images of William, particularly his use of a white horse.

In the bottom right corner, he portrays the death of Marshal Schomberg, the second-in-command of William's army. Schomberg had crossed the Boyne earlier than William and had been killed by Jacobite cavalry in the melee around Oldbridge ford. West transformed Schomberg's chaotic death into a tableau, one that has strong similarities to other heroic death scenes in West's paintings, such as General Wolfe or Horatio Nelson in The Death of Nelson (1806).

== Adoption by the Orange Order ==
Since the 1690s, commemorations—state-sponsored and those held by the lower classes—had been held throughout Ireland celebrating key dates in the Williamite War such as the Battle of the Boyne, Siege of Derry and the Siege of Cork. These followed a tradition started in Elizabethan England of celebrating key events in the Protestant calendar. By the 1740s such organizations as the Boyne Club and the Protestant Society, both seen as forerunners to the Orange Order, held parades in Dublin. As a "history painting, then, West's Battle of the Boyne represented an important moment in time, making it a crucial depiction of an event that was at least anecdotally important, monoscenic depictions of crucial moments in an implied narrative in the ongoing Orangist narrative.

== Origin of the painting ==
In 2011, another original painting of the battle was discovered in a basement of Brownlow House, Lurgan, and testing indicated the painting dates from about the same time as West's 1778 work. Experts conducting the testing and restoration believe the painting was made by a Dutch artist who did not sign his or her work and the piece contains more details than the West painting, suggesting it may even be an earlier production. The painting was damaged by bullet holes and knife slashes, and approximately 45 percent of the painting had been destroyed.

== Reproductions ==
Since West's painting, several reproductions have been made, mostly line etchings and engravings; these are widely exhibited. A smaller oil reproduction is at Mount Stewart, Newtownards, Northern Ireland, and is the property of the National Trust. Another reproduction was made in 1781 by John Hall (Wivenhoe 1739 – London 1797), which can be found at the Wordsworth House, Cumbria. Versions of West's painting were often reproduced on walls throughout Belfast, although these are becoming increasingly rare as the walls give way to urban development.

== Bibliography ==
- Carlton, Charles. This Seat of Mars: War and the British Isles, 1485–1746. Yale University Press, 2011.
- Cathcart, Rex. Ireland and King Billy: Triumphalism Usage and Abusage. History Today. July 1988, pp. 41–45. Online edition 2001. Accessed 23 December 2015.
- Pamela M. Fletcher (1 January 2003). Narrating Modernity: The British Problem Picture, 1895–1914. Ashgate Publishing, Ltd. p. 146 note 12. ISBN 978-0-7546-3568-0.
- Ian McBride. History and Memory in Modern Ireland. Cambridge University Press. ISBN 0-521-79366-1.
- Newsletter: The Pride of Northern Ireland. Restoration of Boyne painting. Friday 3 June 2011. Accessed 23 December 2015.
- Nordstrom, Carolyn. The Paths to Domination, Resistance, and Terror. University of California Press, 1992.
