= Wenceslaus Werlin =

Austrian painter

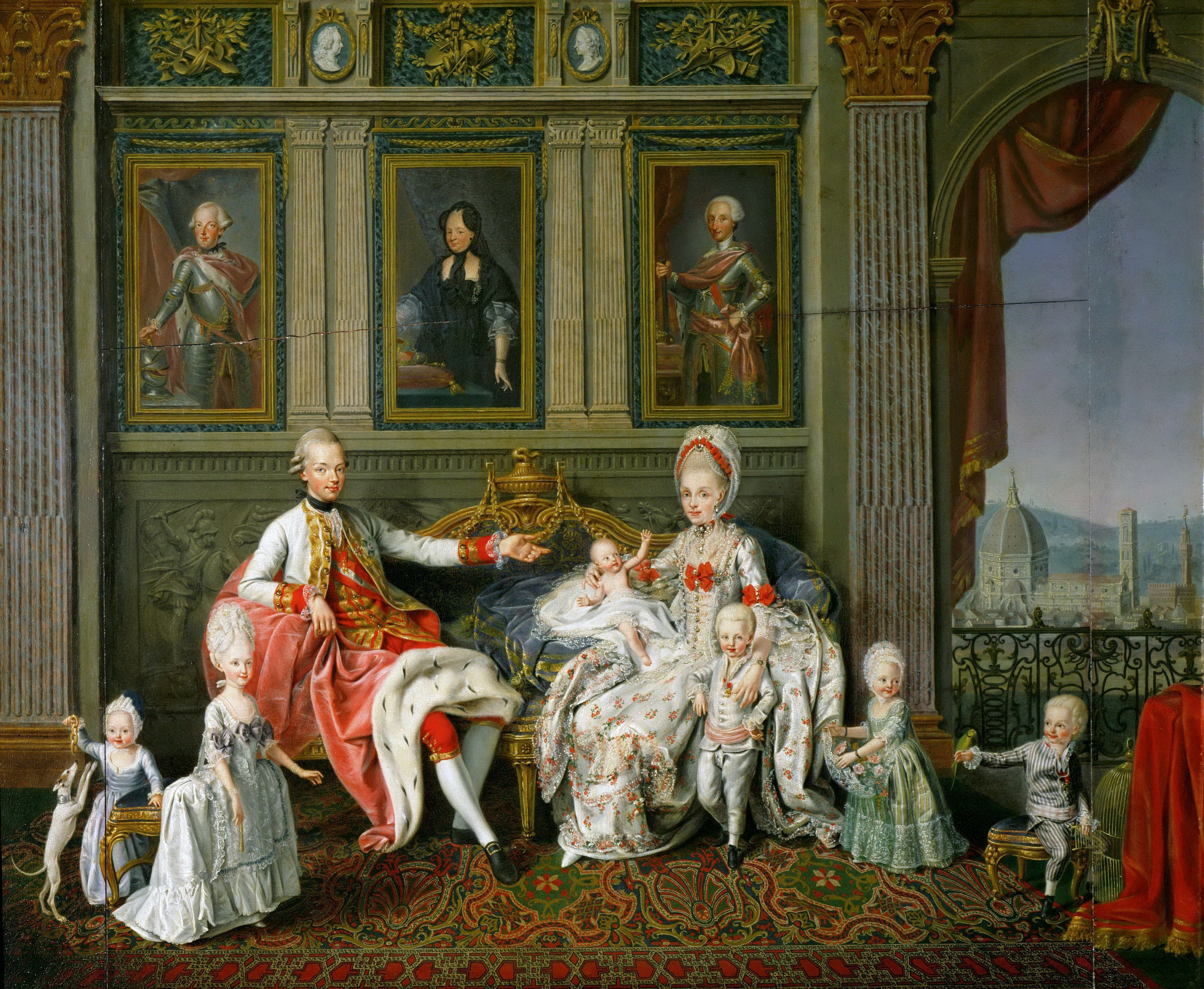
Wenceslaus Werlin, Grand Duke Leopold with his Family, 1773

Wenceslaus Werlin (died 1780) was an Austrian painter. Werlin specialized in portraits and was active in Turin. He died in Florence in 1780.
