= 1779 in art =

Events from the year 1779 in art.

== Events ==
- April 24 – The Royal Academy Exhibition of 1779 opens in Pall Mall in London
- August 25 – The Salon of 1779 opens at the Louvre in Paris.
- October 8 – William Blake enrols as a student with the Royal Academy of Arts at Somerset House in London.

== Paintings ==
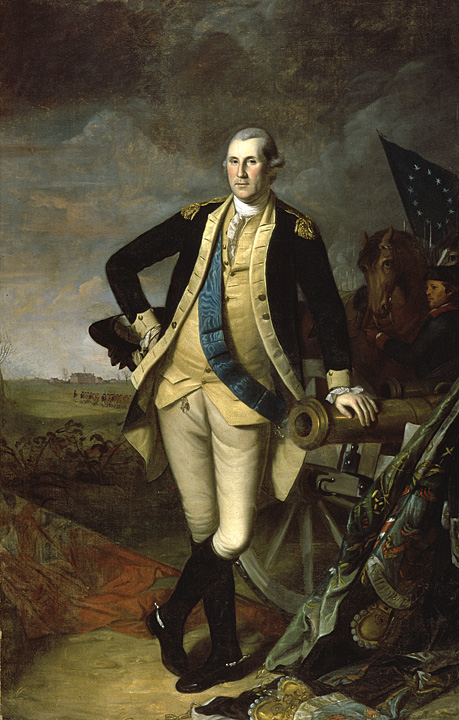
Washington at Princeton by Charles Willson Peale

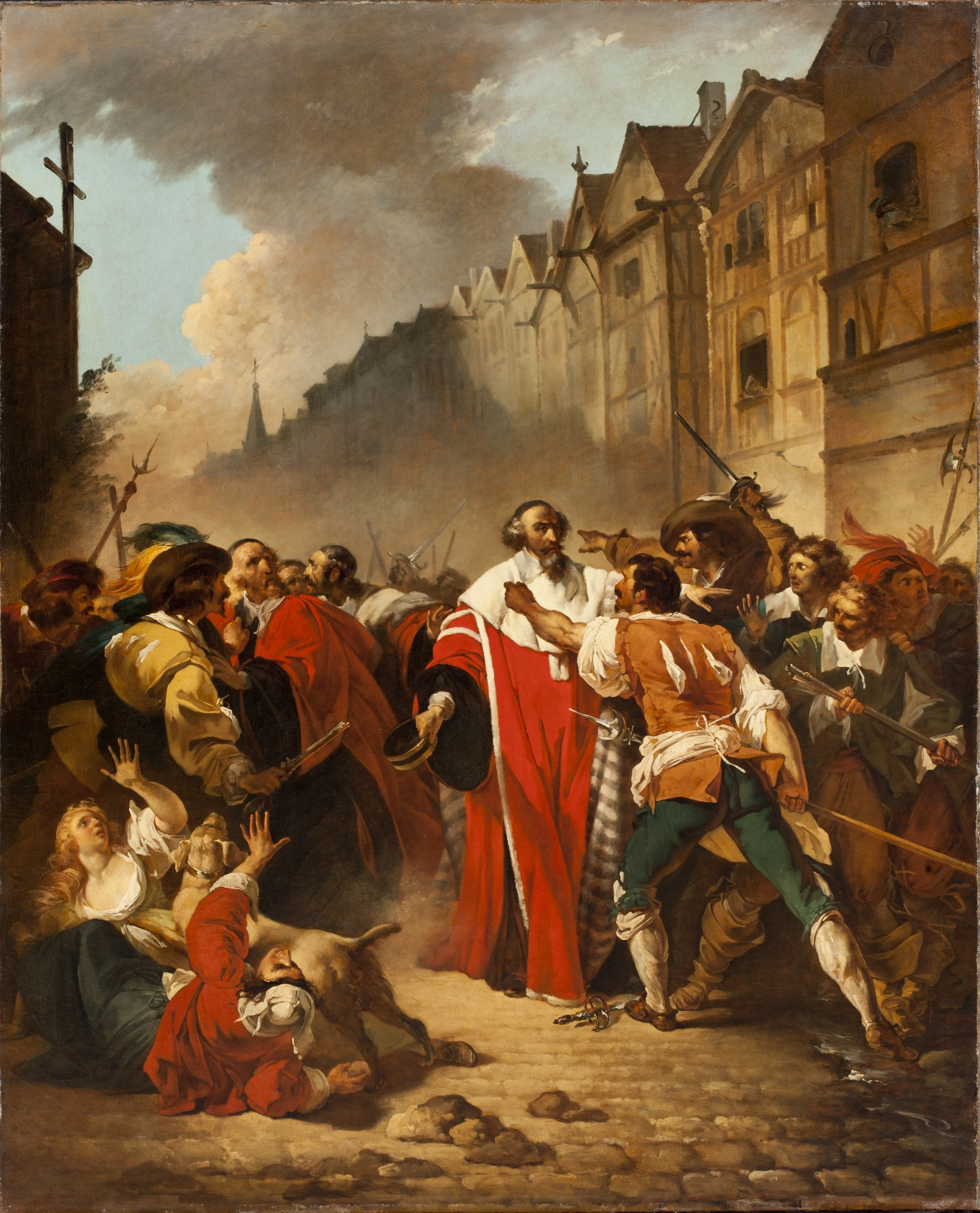
President Molé Confronted by Insurgents by François-André Vincent

- Antoine-François Callet – Portrait of Louis XVI
- Joseph Duplessis – Portrait of the Comte d'Angiviller
- Thomas Gainsborough – Gypsy Encampment, Sunset
- Per Krafft the Elder – Carl Michael Bellman
- Charles Willson Peale – George Washington at Princeton
- Joshua Reynolds
  - Lady Elizabeth Delmé and Her Children
  - Lady Jane Halliday
  - Admiral Lord Keppel (National Portrait Gallery, London)
- Dominic Serres
  - Destruction of the American Fleet at Penobscot Bay
  - The Battle of Quiberon Bay
- George Stubbs
  - The Labourers
  - A Lion and a Tiger
  - Mambrino
- François-André Vincent – President Molé Confronted by Insurgents
- Benjamin West
  - Alfred the Great Dividing His Loaf with a Pilgrim
  - Portrait of George III
  - Portrait of Queen Charlotte

== Births ==
- January 3 – Gustav Philipp Zwinger, German painter (died 1819)
- February 20 – Augustus Wall Callcott, English landscape painter (died 1844)
- March 21 – Vojtěch Benedikt Juhn, Czech painter and engraver (died 1843)
- April 19 - Anson Dickinson, American painter of miniature portraits (died 1852)
- May 27 – Juan Antonio Ribera, Spanish Neoclassicism painter (died 1860)
- July 8 – Giorgio Pullicino, Maltese painter and architect (died 1851)
- July 26 – Erik Gustaf Göthe, Swedish sculptor (died 1838)
- August 24 – Charles Norris, English topographical etcher and writer known for his landscape work of the Welsh countryside (died 1858)
- November 4 – Jan Willem Pieneman, Dutch historical painter (died 1853)
- November 5 – Washington Allston, American painter, the "American Titian" (died 1843)
- November 6 – Henry Pierce Bone, English enamel painter (died 1855)
- December 9 – Moritz Retzsch, German painter and etcher (died 1857)
- date unknown
  - Paolo Caronni, Italian engraver (died 1842)
  - Guillaume Descamps, French painter and engraver (died 1858)
  - Vasily Demut-Malinovsky, Russian sculptor in the Empire style (died 1846)

== Deaths ==
- January 26 – Thomas Hudson, English portrait painter (born 1701)
- February 4 – John Hamilton Mortimer, English Neoclassical painter known primarily for his romantic paintings and pieces set in Italy and its countryside (born 1740)
- March 14 – Joseph-Charles Roettiers, French engraver and medallist (born 1689)
- April – Károly Bebo, Hungarian sculptor, builder and decorator noted for his stucco work (born 1712)
- June 29 – Anton Raphael Mengs, German painter (born 1728)
- September 14 – Anton Pichler, Austrian goldsmith and engraver (born 1697)
- October – John Giles Eccardt, German-born English portrait painter (date of birth unknown)
- December 6 – Jean-Baptiste-Siméon Chardin, French painter (born 1699)
