= Wooded landscape with gipsies round a camp fire =

Lost painting by Thomas Gainsborough

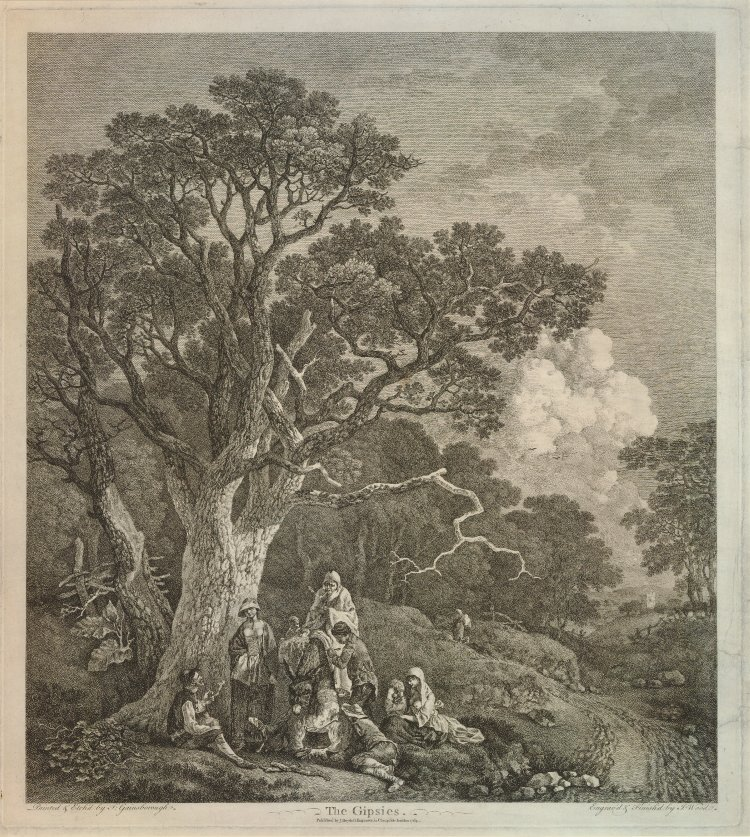
The etching, 1764, based on the lost painting, published by John Boydell

Thomas Gainsborough was the first British artist to make a major study of the subject of Romani people, beginning with two paintings in the 1750s, the first of which he never finished, and the second of which is now lost, but survives in an etching by Gainsborough.

== Provenance ==
His Landscape with Gipsies, according to an anecdote told by Joshua Kirby's grandson Trimmer to Walter Thornbury in the 19th century, was originally commissioned from Gainsborough by a gentleman from "near Ipswich". The patron visited Gainsborough two-thirds of the way through his making the painting, and expressed his dislike of it; in response to which Gainsborough angrily told him that "You shall not have it" and proceeded to slash the canvas with a penknife. Kirby begged Gainsborough for the painting, which was then repaired by Trimmer's father, and it is now in the Tate collection, number N05845. There are detectable repaired slashes in the canvas, lending credence to Trimmer's anecdote.

Trimmer further related that Gainsborough went on to paint a replacement painting for the patron, Wooded landscape with gipsies round a camp fire also named The Gipsies. Trimmer was not able to track it down himself. Its ownership has been traced as far as Thomas Anson, 1st Earl of Lichfield but its whereabouts thereafter is unknown.

Although the oil on canvas is a lost work it survives as an etching, one of the best known of the few Gainsborough etchings. The etching was originally made by Gainsborough himself sometime around 1758, with further work done on it by the professional engraver Joseph (a.k.a. John) Wood and publication in 1759. Several copies of the print are in the collection of the British Museum and other collections. Gainsborough made several trial proofs of the etching, which have enabled art historians to analyze its development as he was working on it. It is notable for being the first commercially published print of Gainsborough's work.

The painting and a forged painting of it was the main subject on Fake or Fortune? series 8 episode 1 in 2019.

== Themes ==
Landscape with Gipsies is similarly structured to Gainsborough's "Cottage Door" series of paintings, and is a similar family group portrait. Although lacking the series' eponymous cottage, the landscape in the background effectively serves as the gypsy family's house and garden. In the painting, a male gathers faggots, fuel for a fire beneath a cooking pot, whilst another male searches in panniers attached to a donkey and some children sit. The painting is centred on the donkey, and for that reason as well as the arrangement of light reflected off the woman astride the donkey and one of the children by the fire, also bears some similarity to traditional scenes of the Nativity of Jesus.

The Gipsies depicts a group of gypsies gathered around a fire under a tree with a prominent dead branch hanging above them.

Landscape with Gipsies contrasts with Gainsborough's approximately two decades later painting Gypsy Encampment, Sunset. There, the family and animals are moved to the edges of the painting, and are in shadow, with the centre of the painting being an empty stretch of grassland. There is no reflected light from the fire or otherwise on the figures, whose faces and indeed number are indistinct. On the right, a man tends to two horses, whilst in the grouping on the left a man gropes the breast of a woman and a figure stands bent over a cauldron. A church spire in the background, something akin to which is also present but almost invisibly small in Landscape with Gipsies, is far more prominent.

== Related works ==
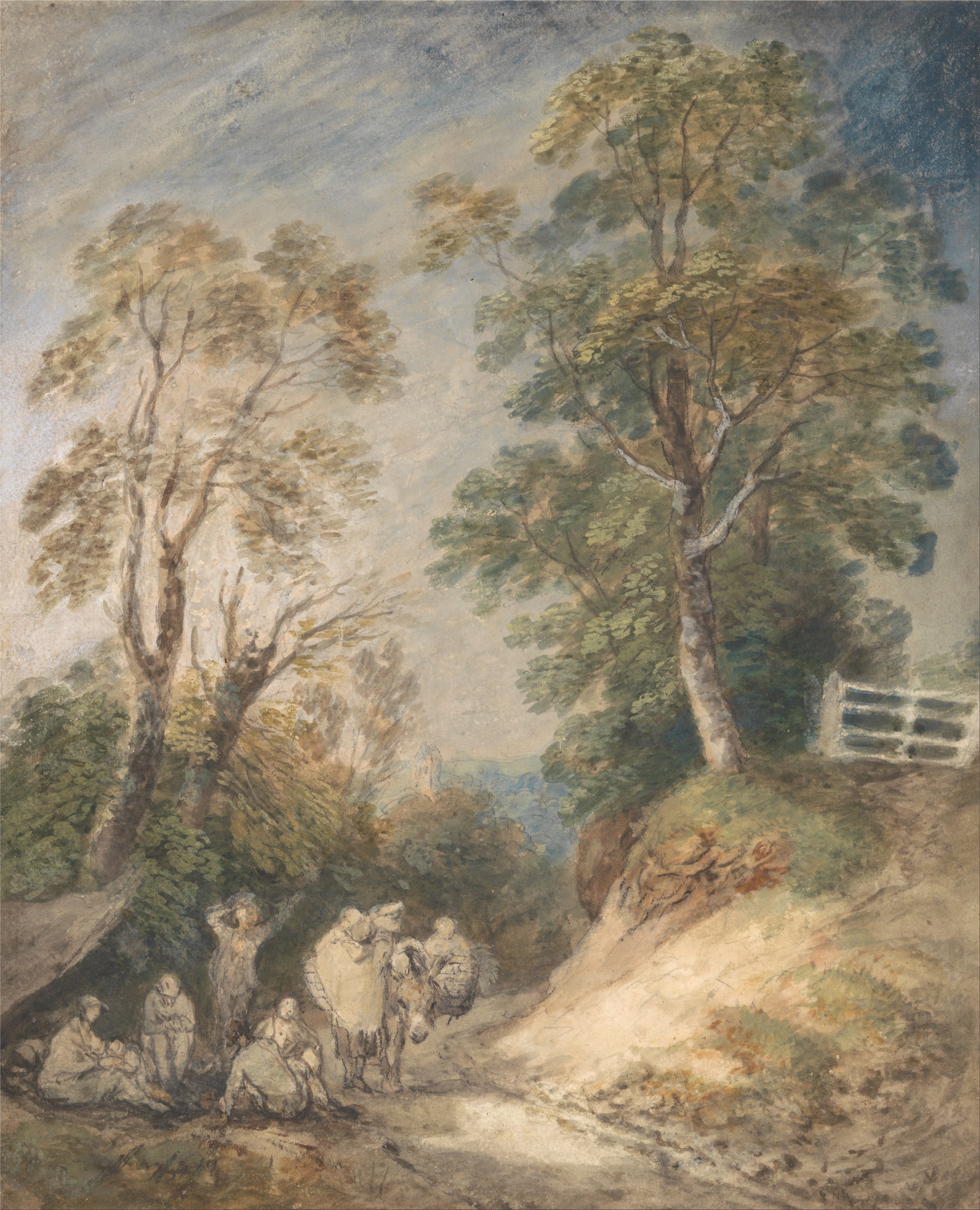
Country Lane with Gypsies Resting (watercolour, early 1760s)

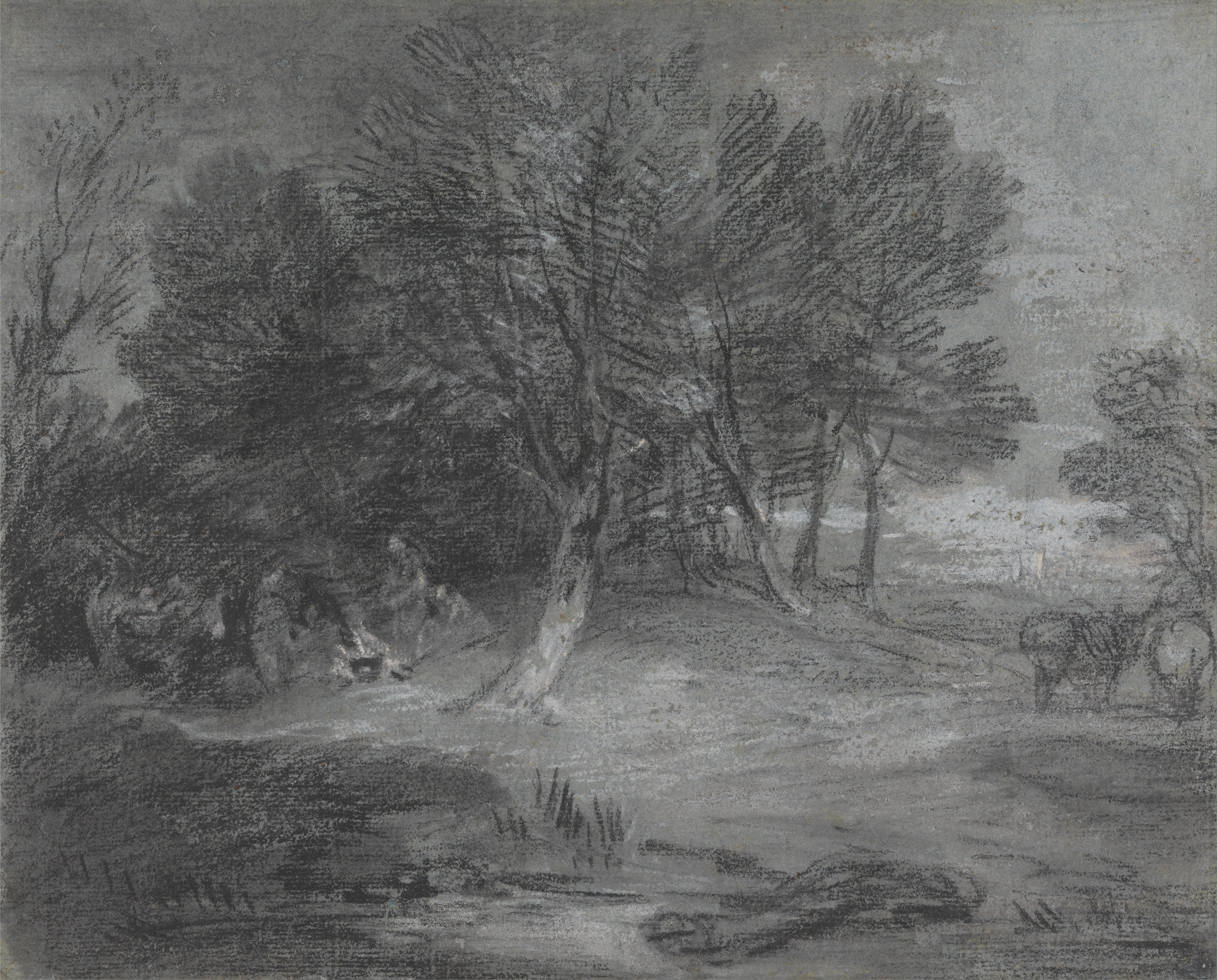
Wooded Landscape with Gypsy Encampment (chalk on paper, late 1770s)
