= Royal Academy Exhibition of 1779 =

1779 art exhibition in London

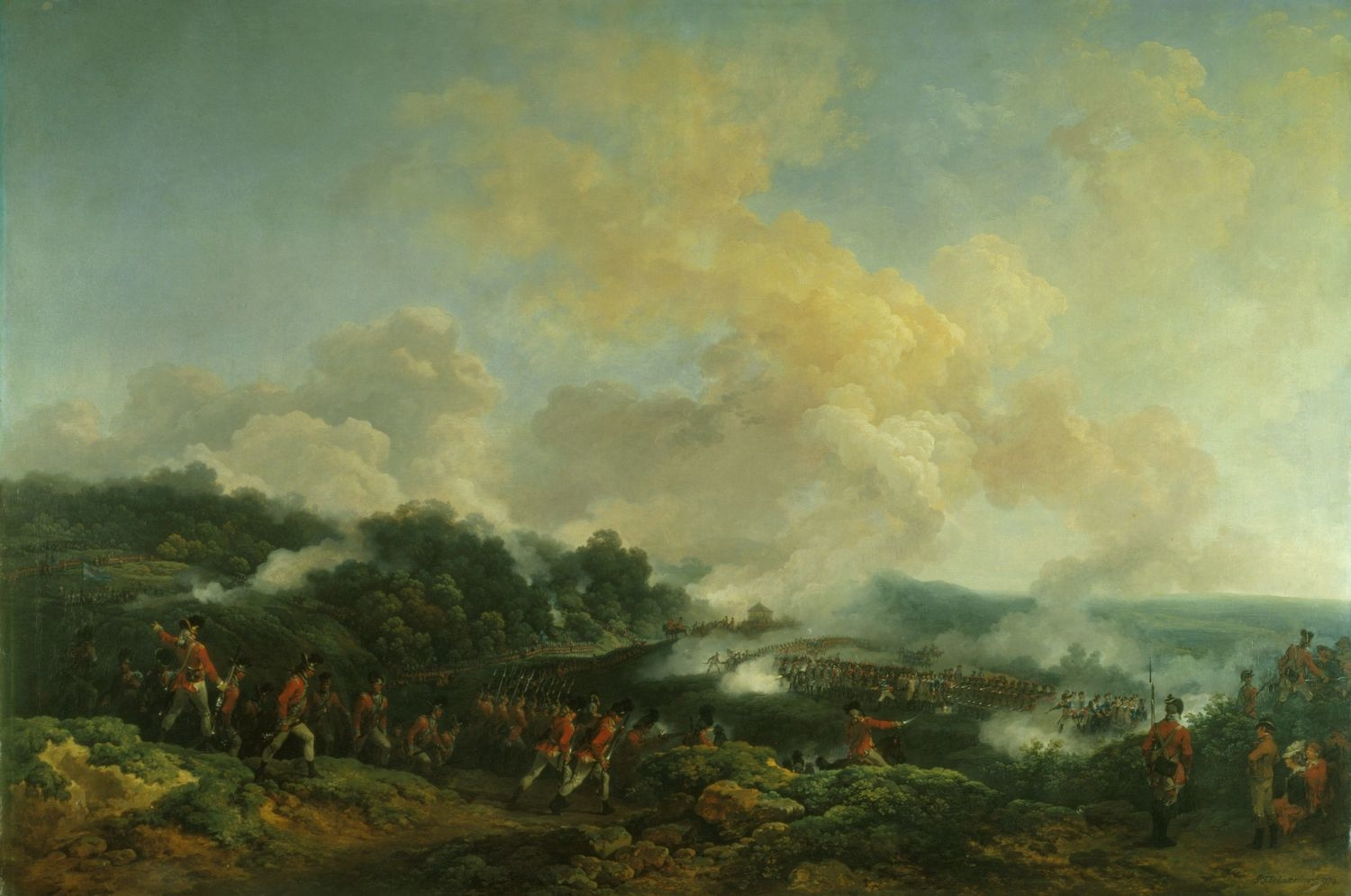
The Mock Attack by Philip James de Loutherbourg

The Royal Academy Exhibition of 1779 was an art exhibition held in London. The eleventh annual Summer Exhibition of the British Royal Academy of Arts, it took place at rented rooms in Pall Mall between 24 April and 29 May 1779 featuring submissions by leading painters, sculptors and architects. It was the final exhibition before the Royal Academy moved to permanent headquarters at Somerset House. Taking place amidst the background of the American War of Independence, it was held during the same year that France and Spain launched an unsuccessful attempt to invade England. The military preparations to defend against this are shown in two paintings Warley Camp and The Mock Attack by Loutherbourg.

The President of the Royal Academy Joshua Reynolds was frequently the dominant exhibitor at the time. In 1779 he displayed eleven paintings, although his main submission was his Nativity of Christ. The painting was acquired by the Duke of Rutland but was later destroyed in a fire at Belvoir Castle in 1816. It met a mixed reception from critics at the exhibition. The painting was originally produced as a design for a stained glass window at the chapel of New College, Oxford. Reynolds also displayed paintings intended as accompanying designs representing Faith, Hope and Charity. His perennial rival Thomas Gainsborough's portrait of the Duchess of Gloucester, drew critical praise.

The Swiss artist Angelica Kauffman, known for her Neoclassical style, submitted seven paintings which were widely praised . Benjamin West exhibited the history painting Alfred the Great Dividing His Loaf with a Pilgrim, which had been commissioned by John Boydell.

Amongst the other works on display was Portraits in the Characters of the Muses in the Temple of Apollo by Richard Samuel, depicting leading female figures associated with the Bluestocking movement. The Labourers by George Stubbs, which combined landscape and genre painting, was widely acclaimed.

== Gallery ==
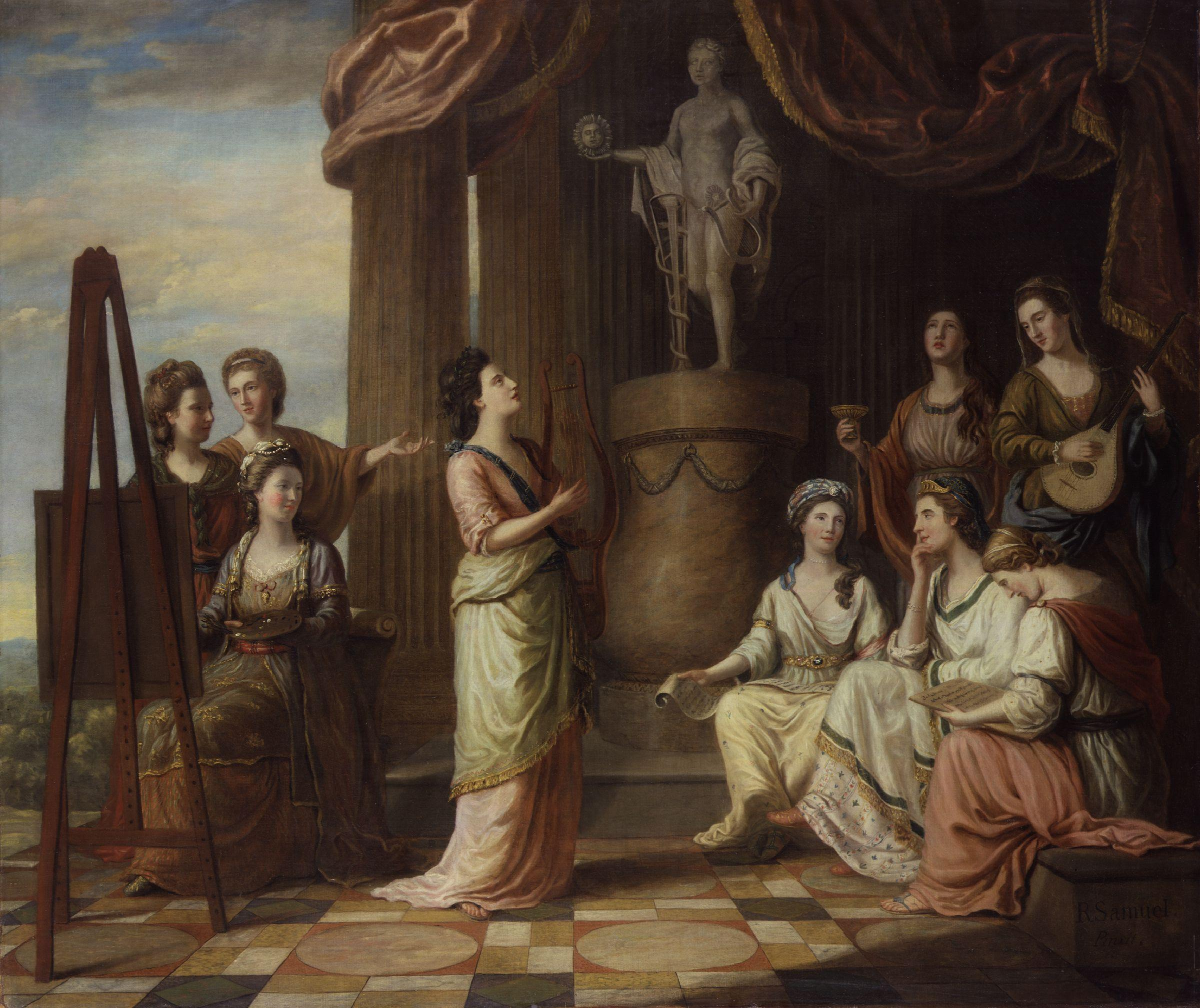
Portraits in the Characters of the Muses in the Temple of Apollo by Richard Samuel

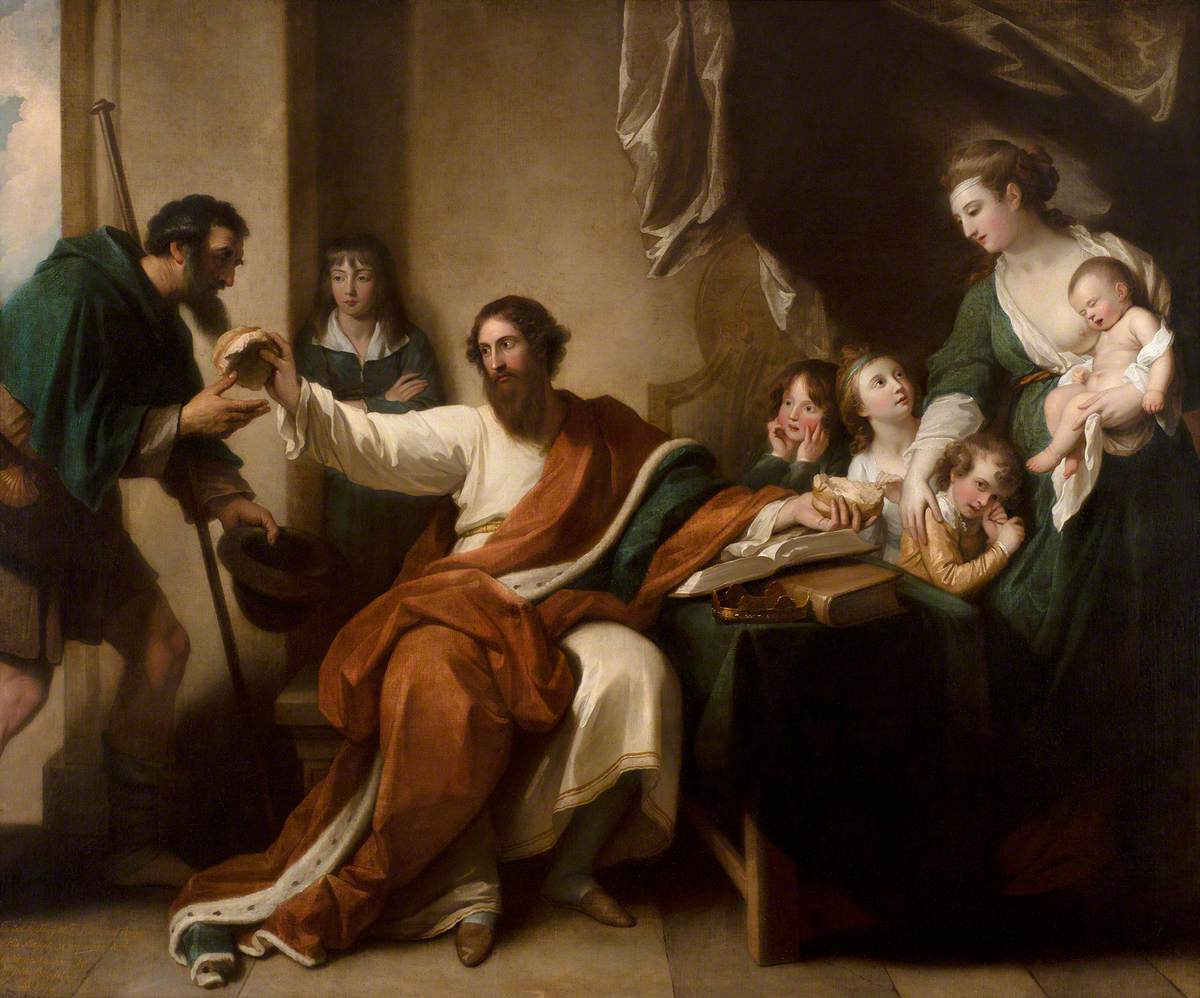
Alfred the Great Dividing His Loaf with a Pilgrim by Benjamin West

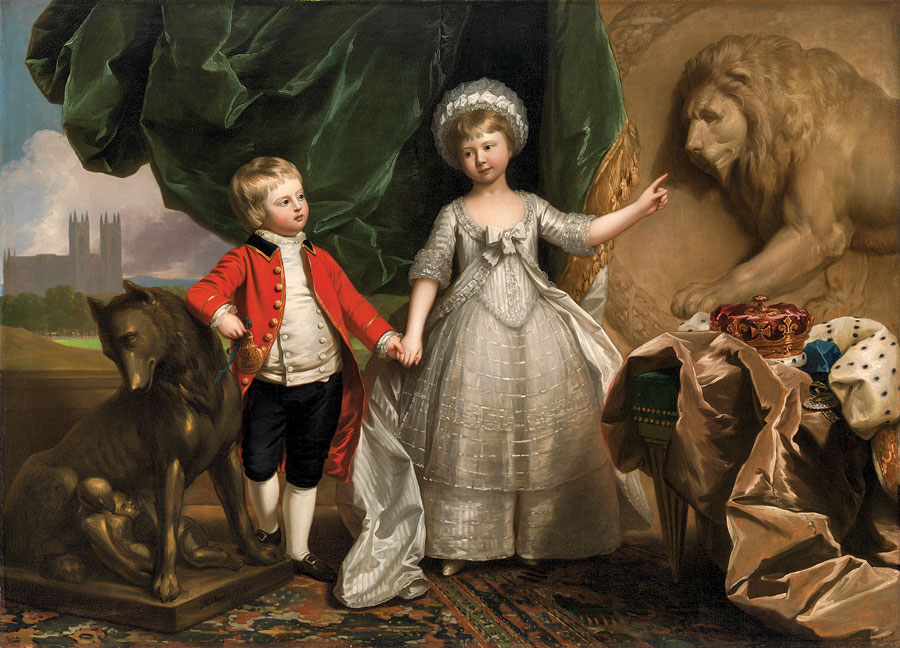
Prince William and Princess Sophia by Benjamin West

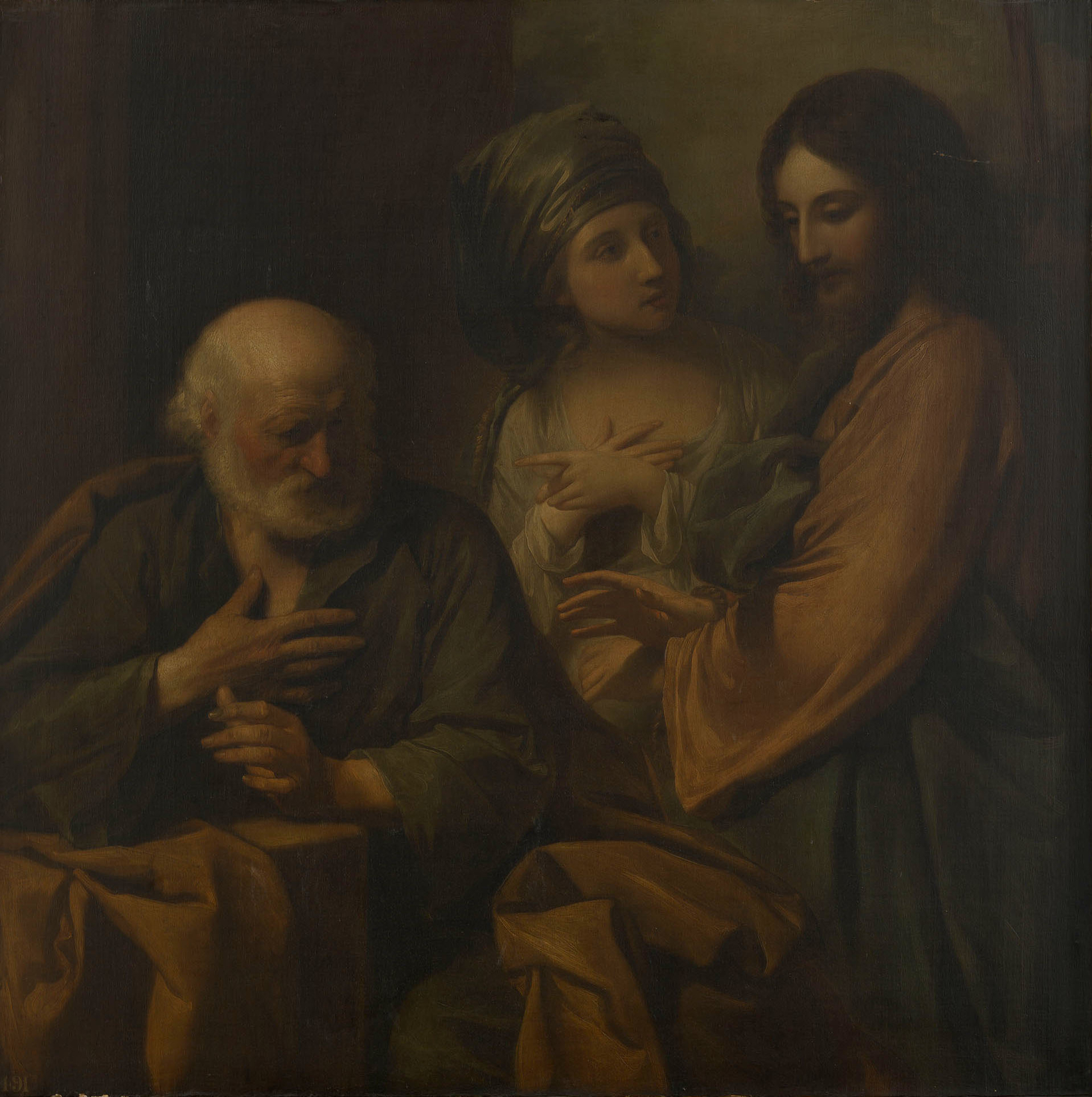
Saint Peter Denying Christ by Benjamin West

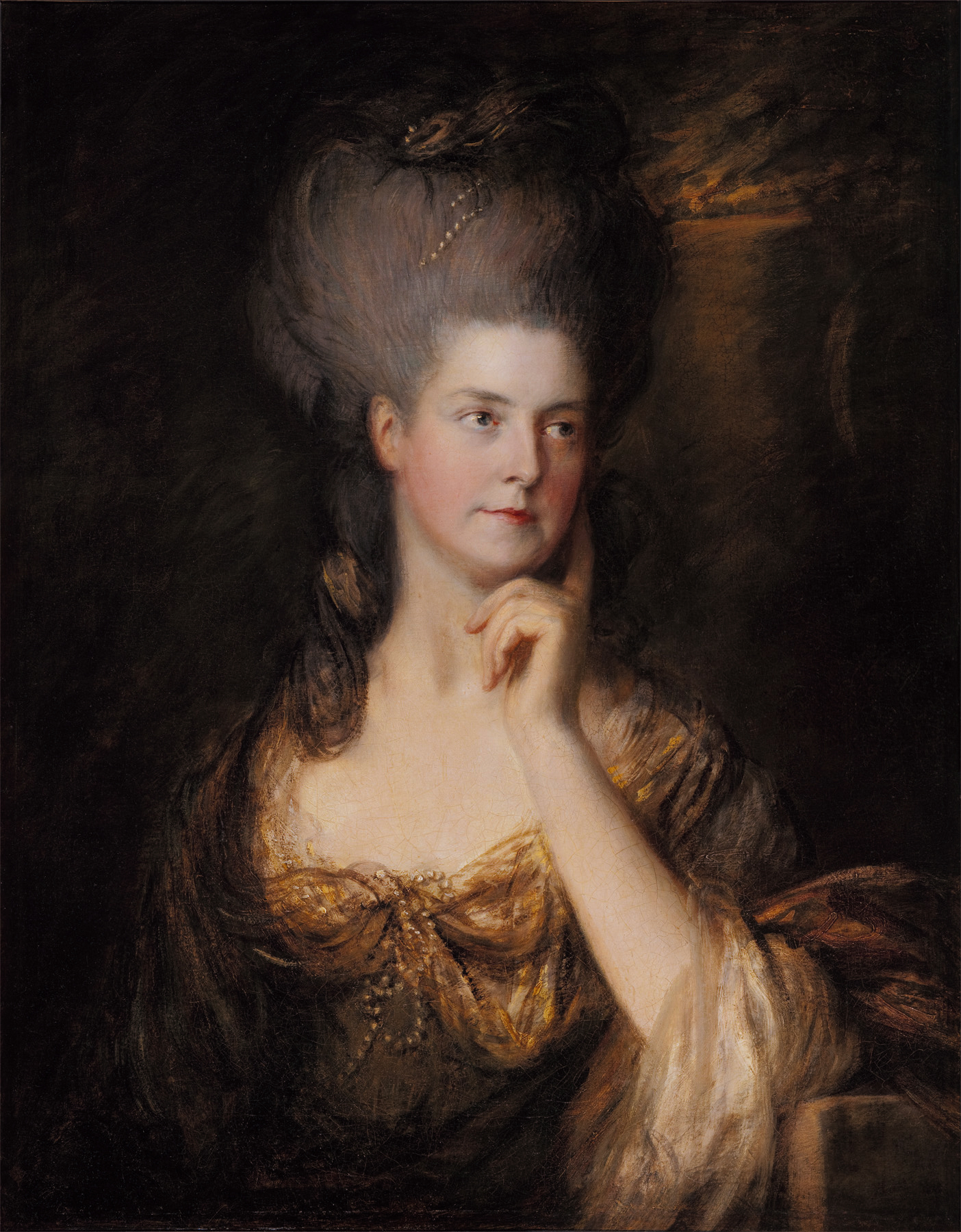
Portrait of the Duchess of Gloucester by Thomas Gainsborough

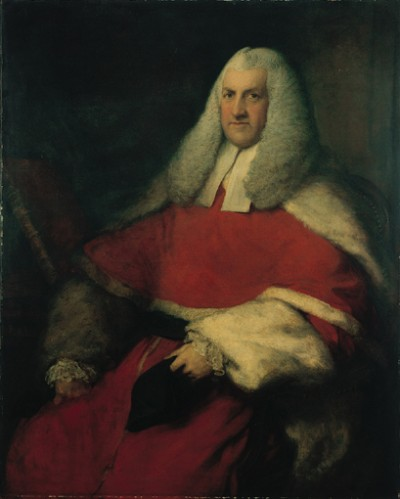
Portrait of Richard Perryn by Thomas Gainsborough

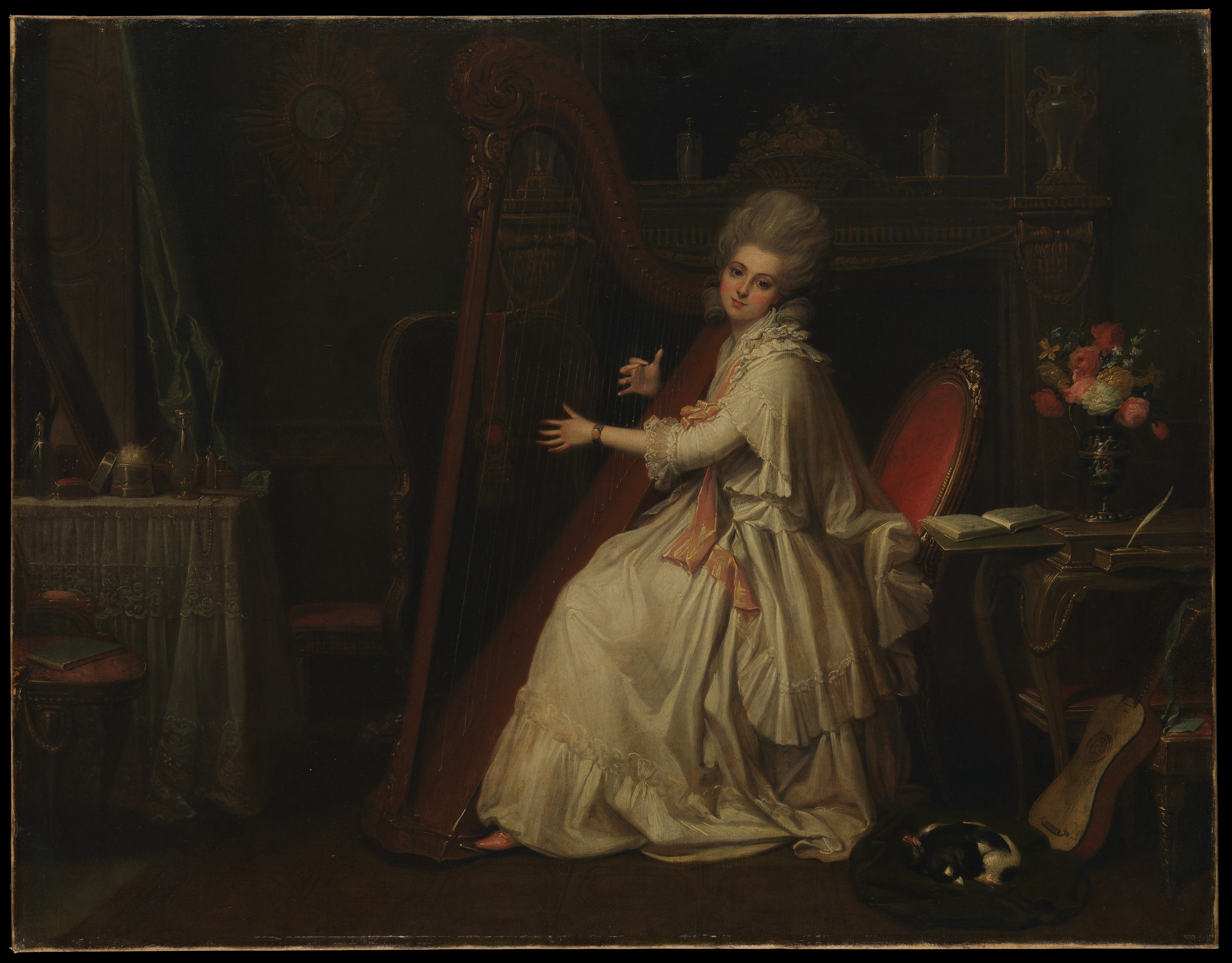
Portrait of Marianne Dorothy Harland by Richard Cosway

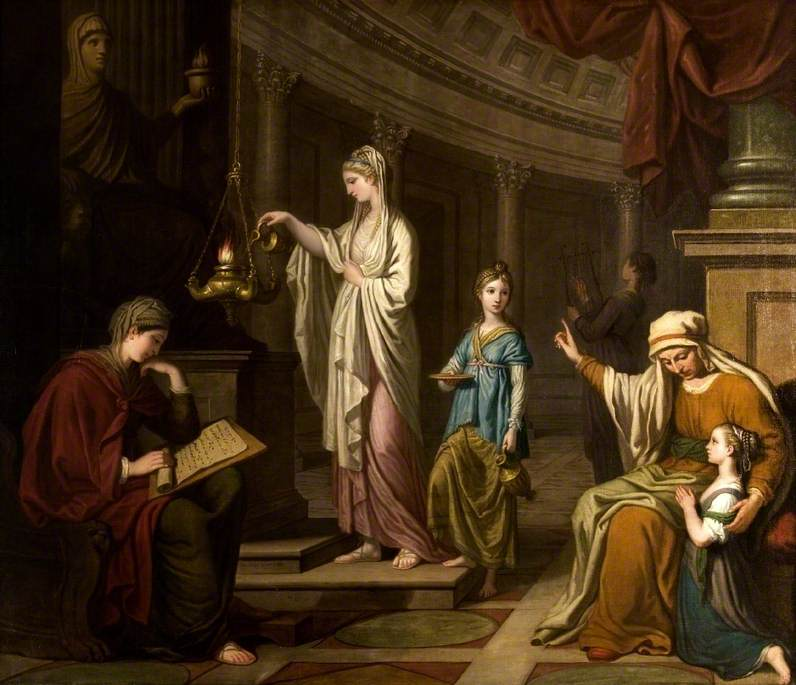
The Vestals Attending the Sacred Fire by David Allan

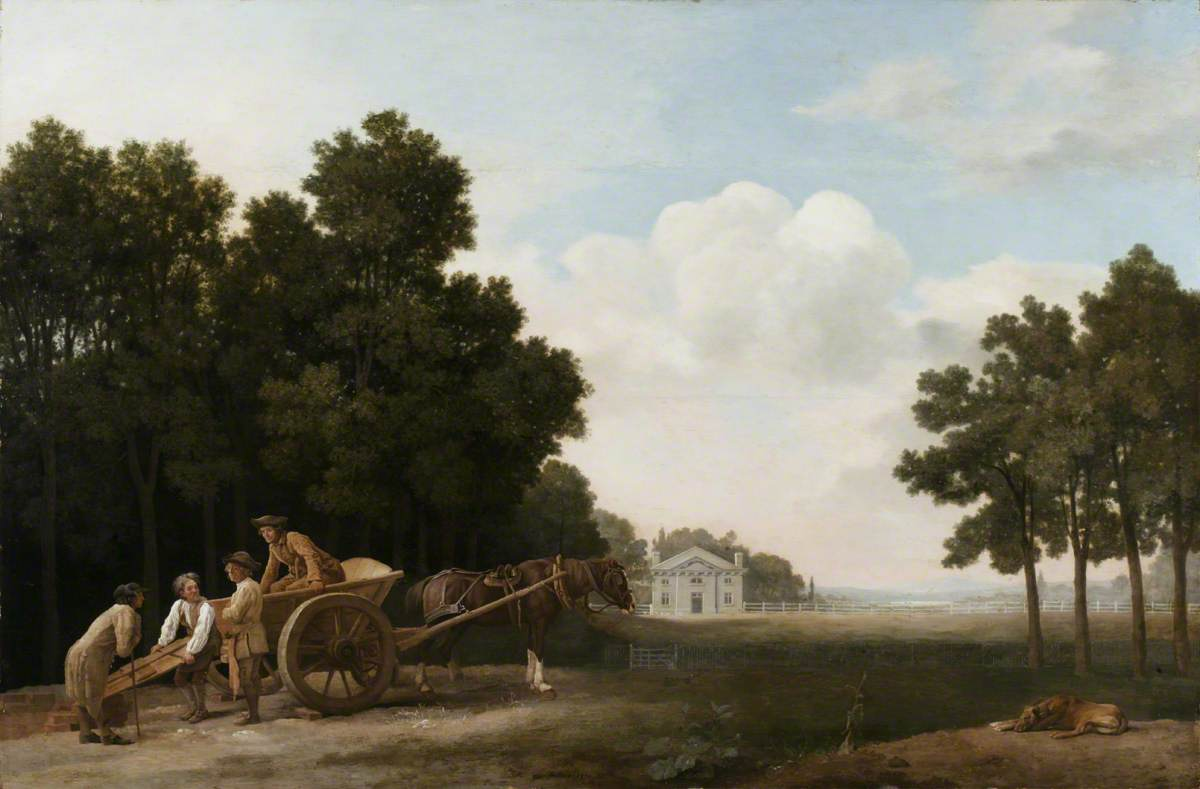
The Labourers by George Stubbs

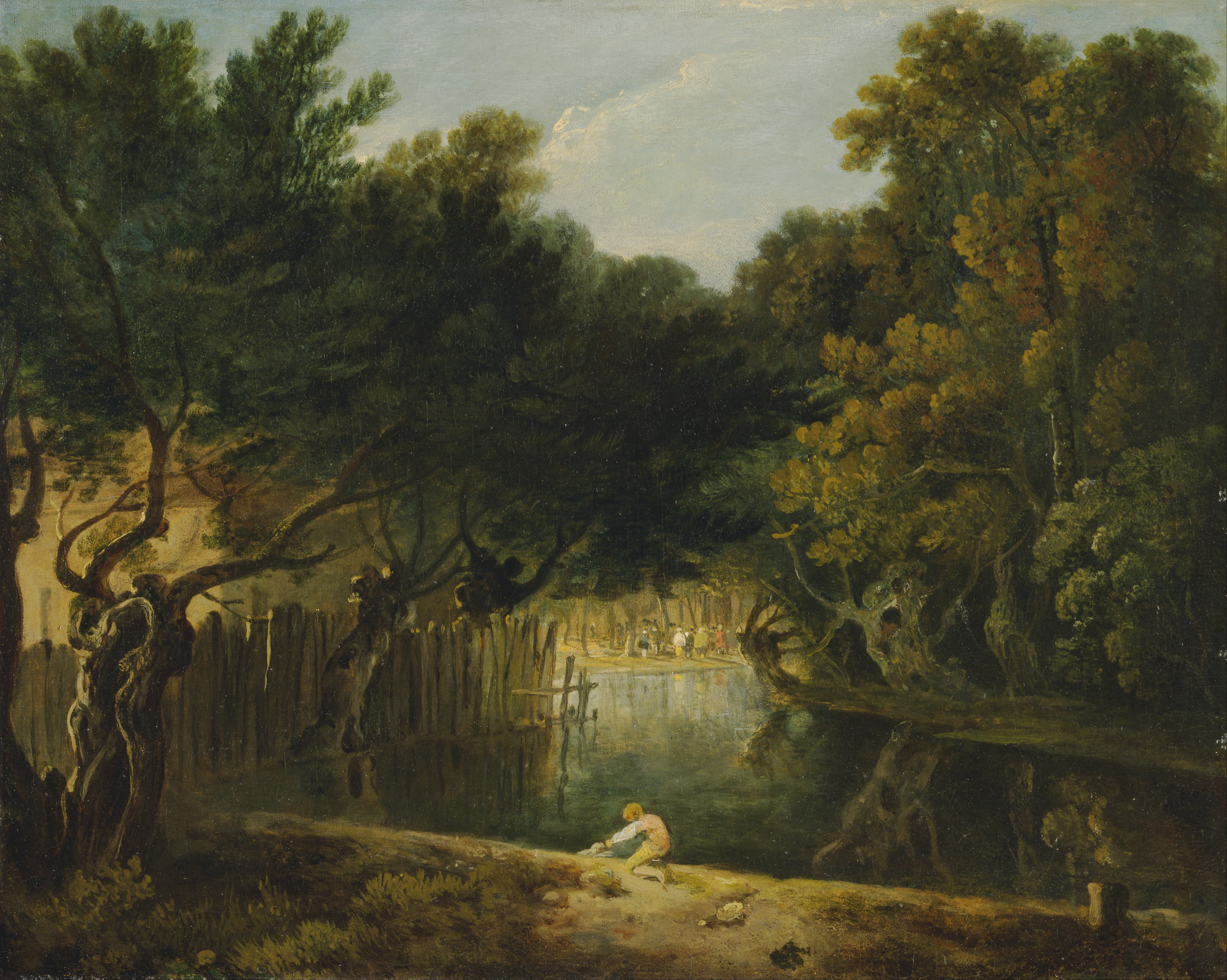
View of the Wilderness in St. James's Park by Richard Wilson

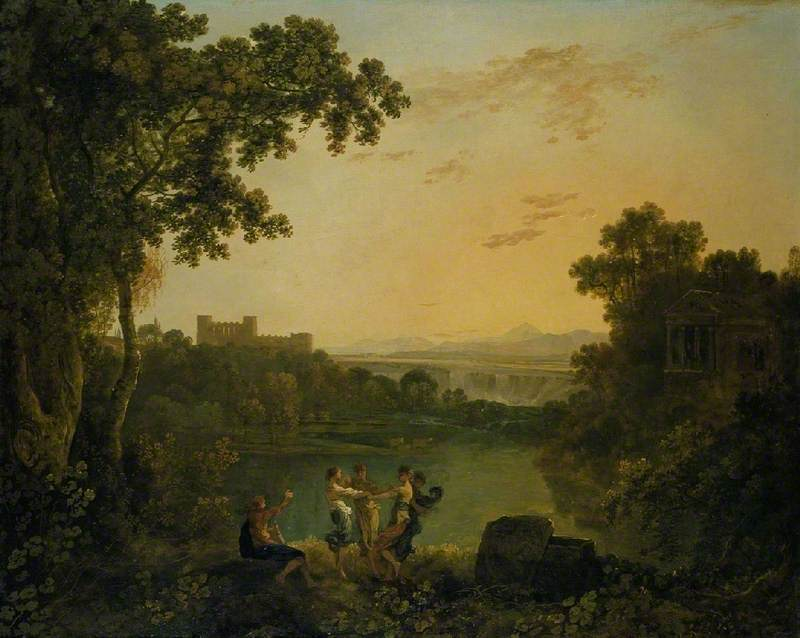
Apollo and the Seasons by Richard Wilson

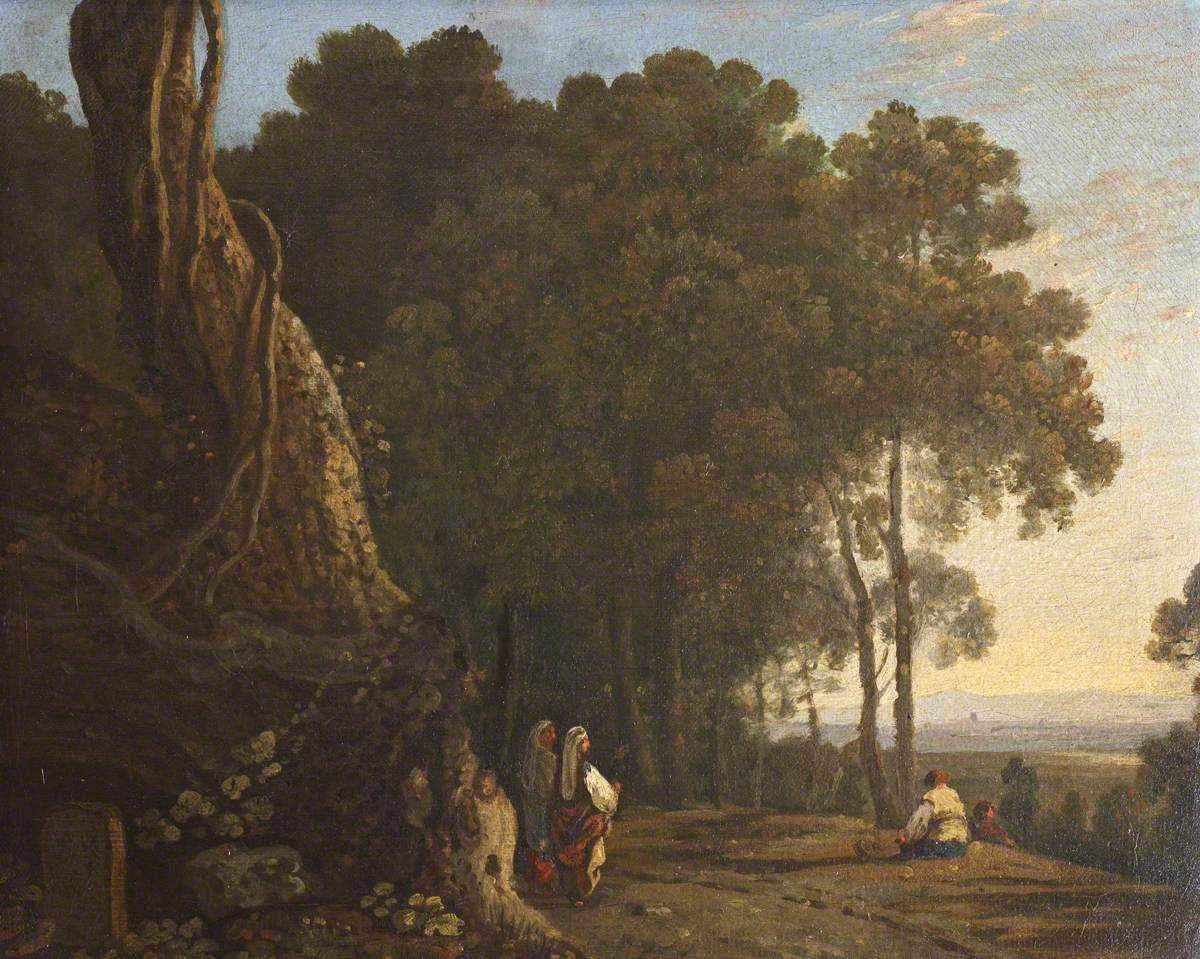
Gypsies at the Entrance to a Wood by Richard Wilson

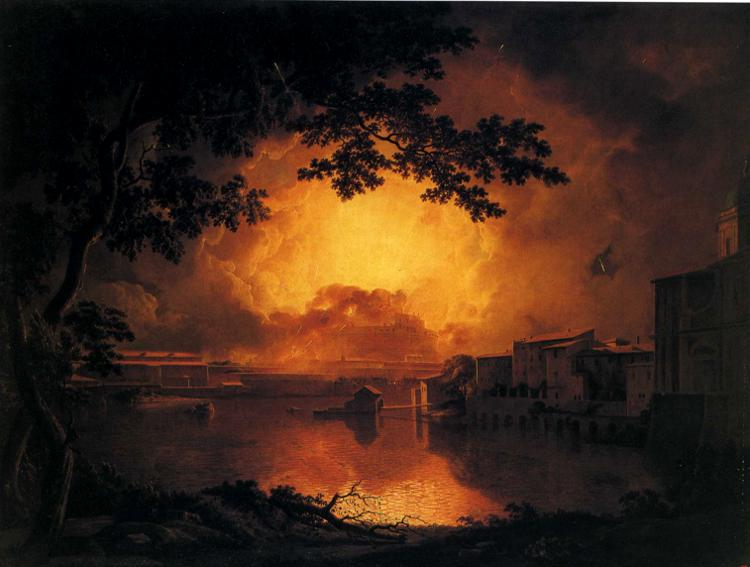
The Girandola in Rome by Joseph Wright of Derby

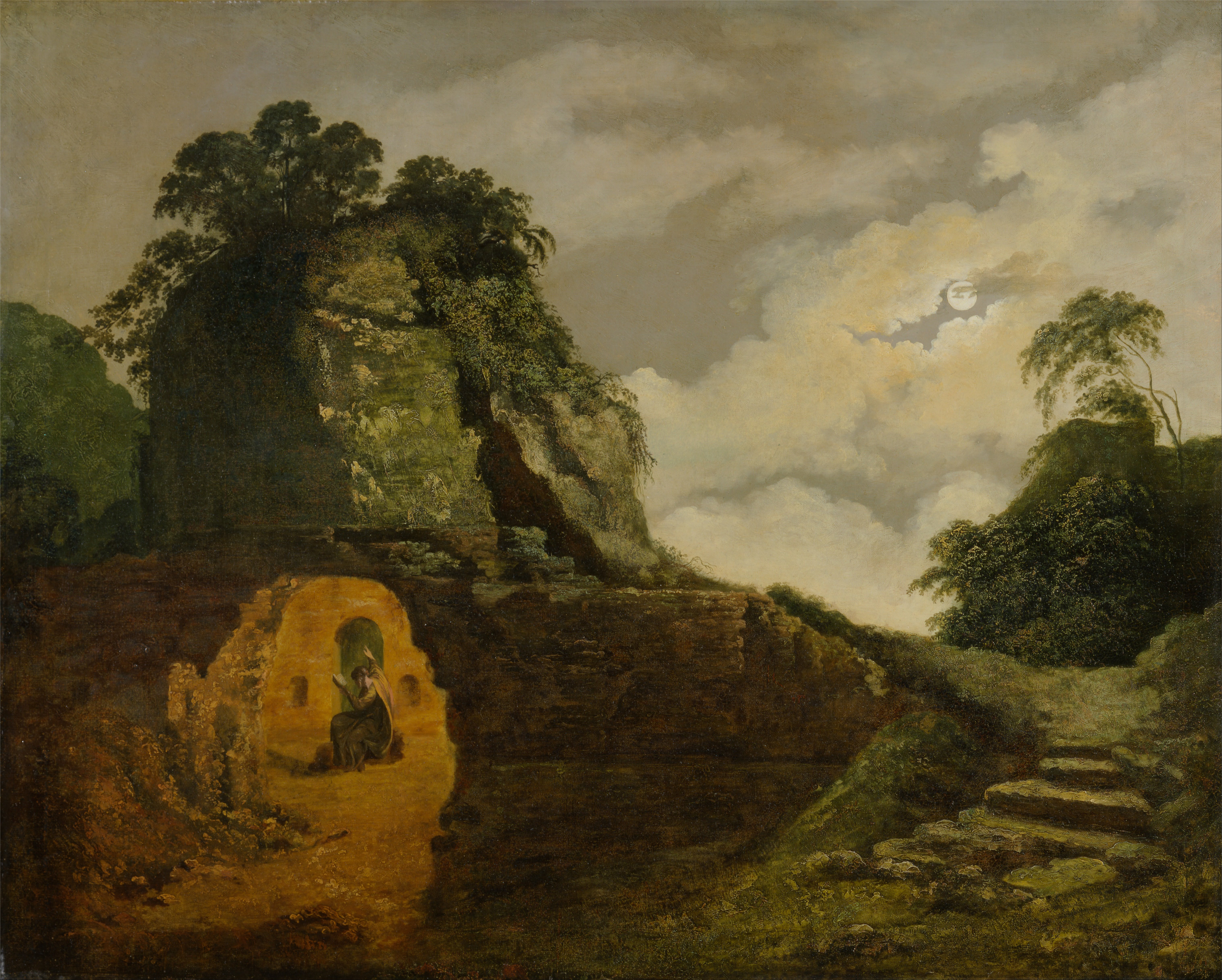
Virgil's Tomb by Moonlight by Joseph Wright of Derby

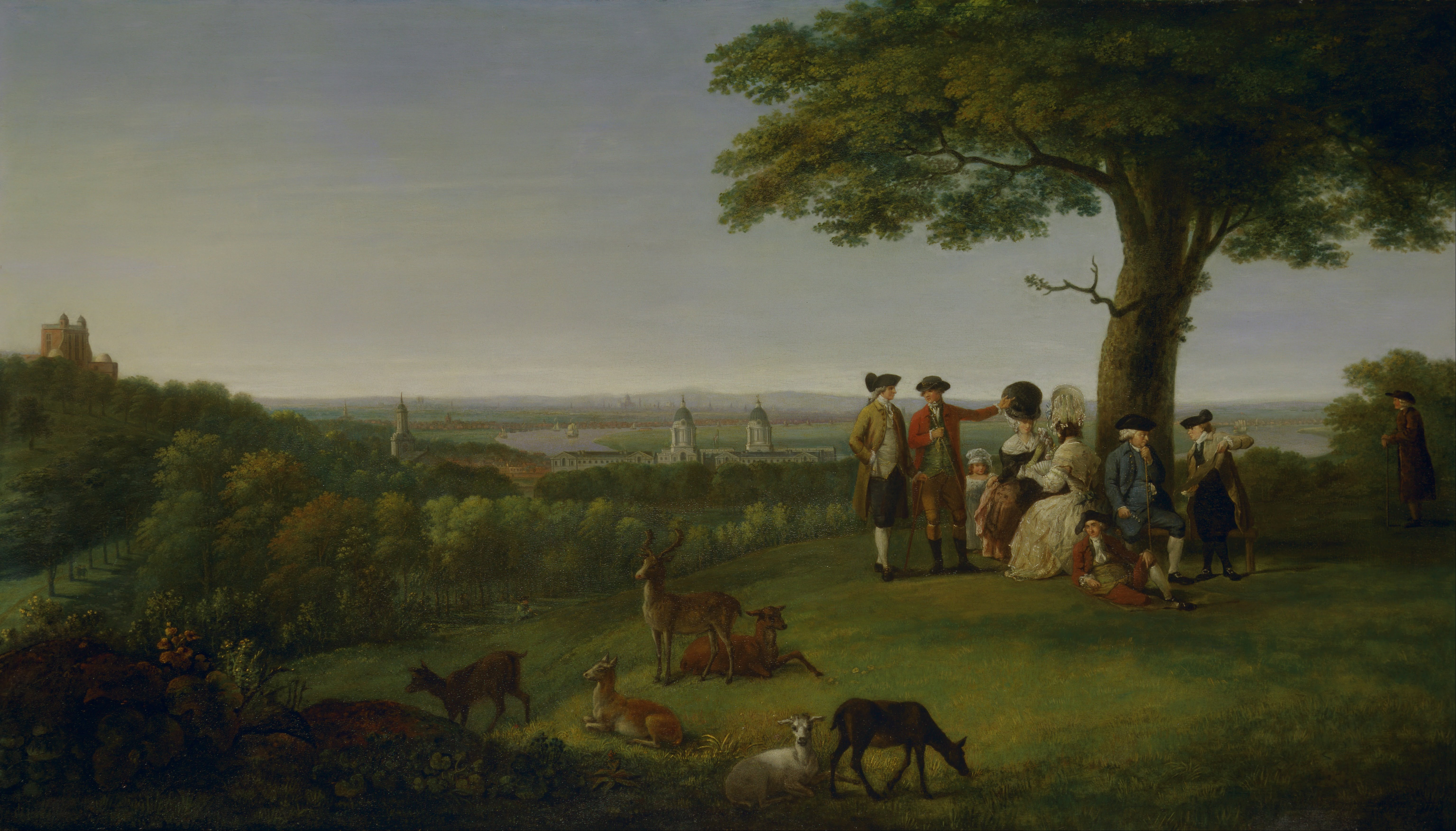
One Tree Hill, Greenwich by John Feary

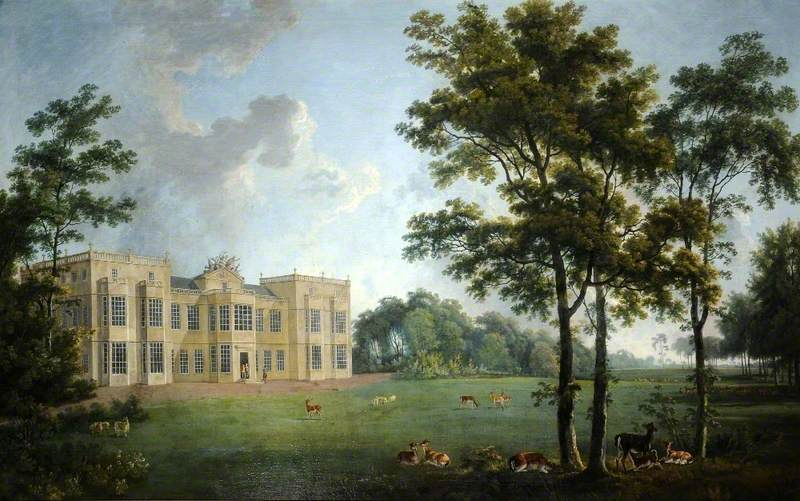
The West Front of Burton Constable by George Barret

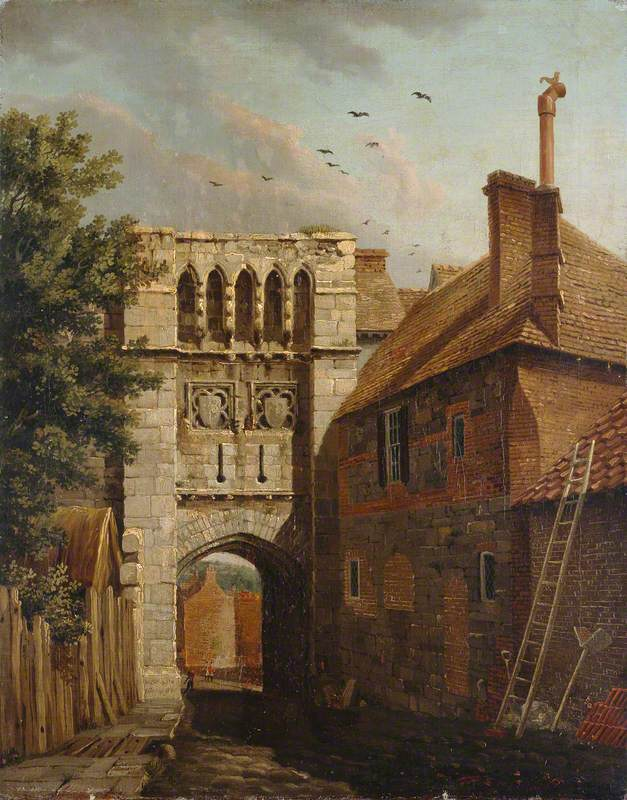
Westgate, Winchester by Michael Angelo Rooker

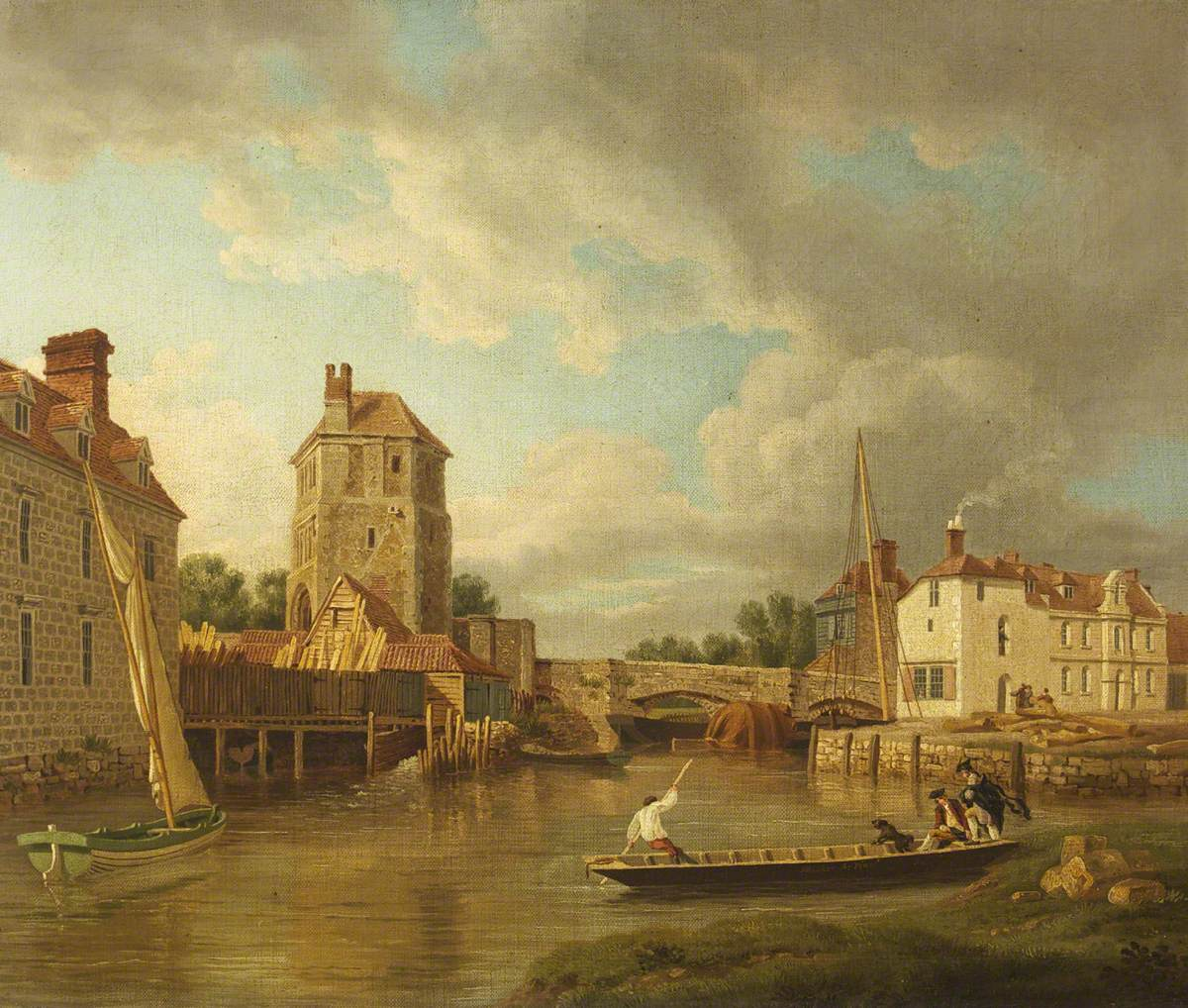
Friar Bacon's Study by Michael Angelo Rooker

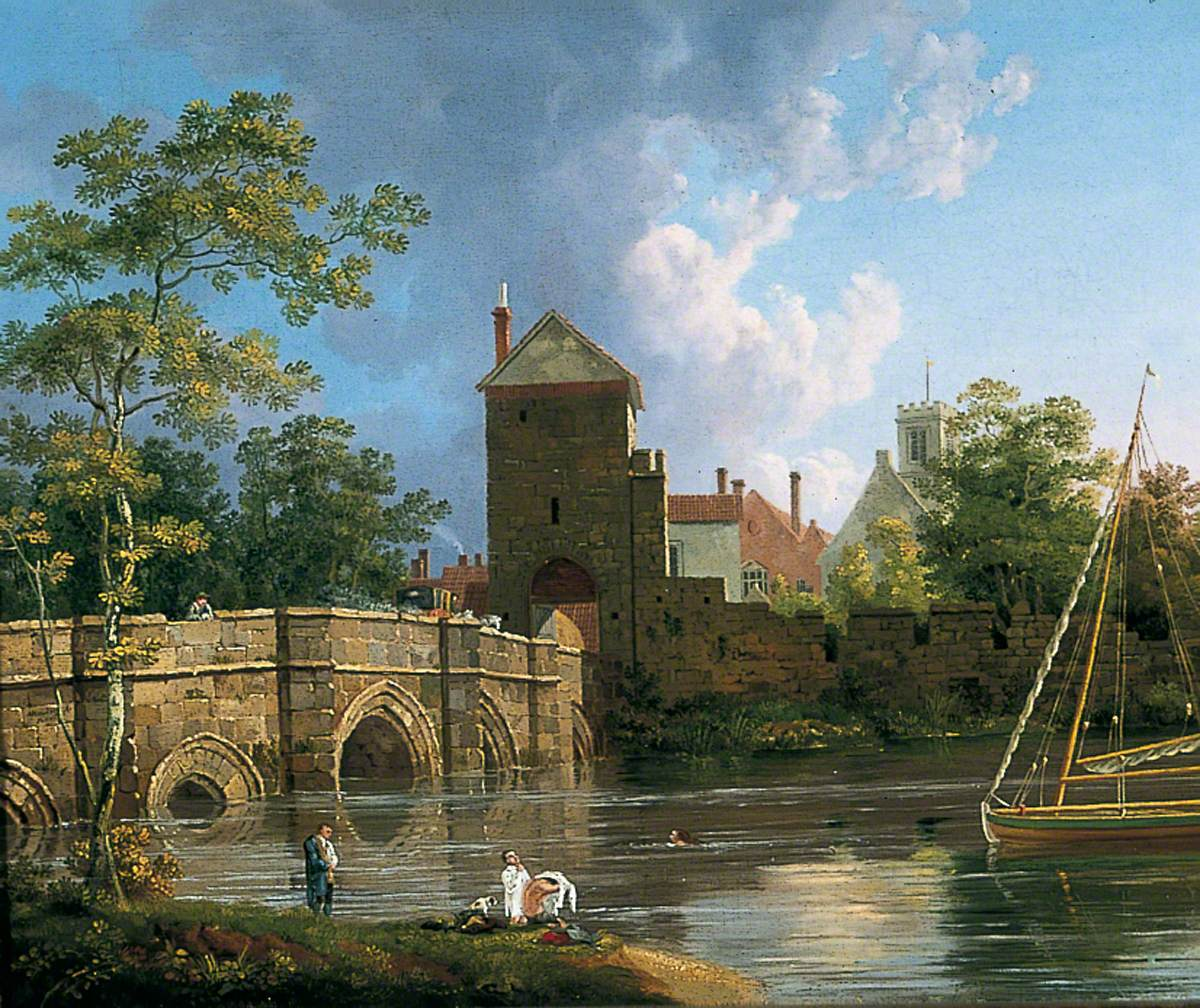
Layerthorpe Postern, York by Michael Angelo Rooker

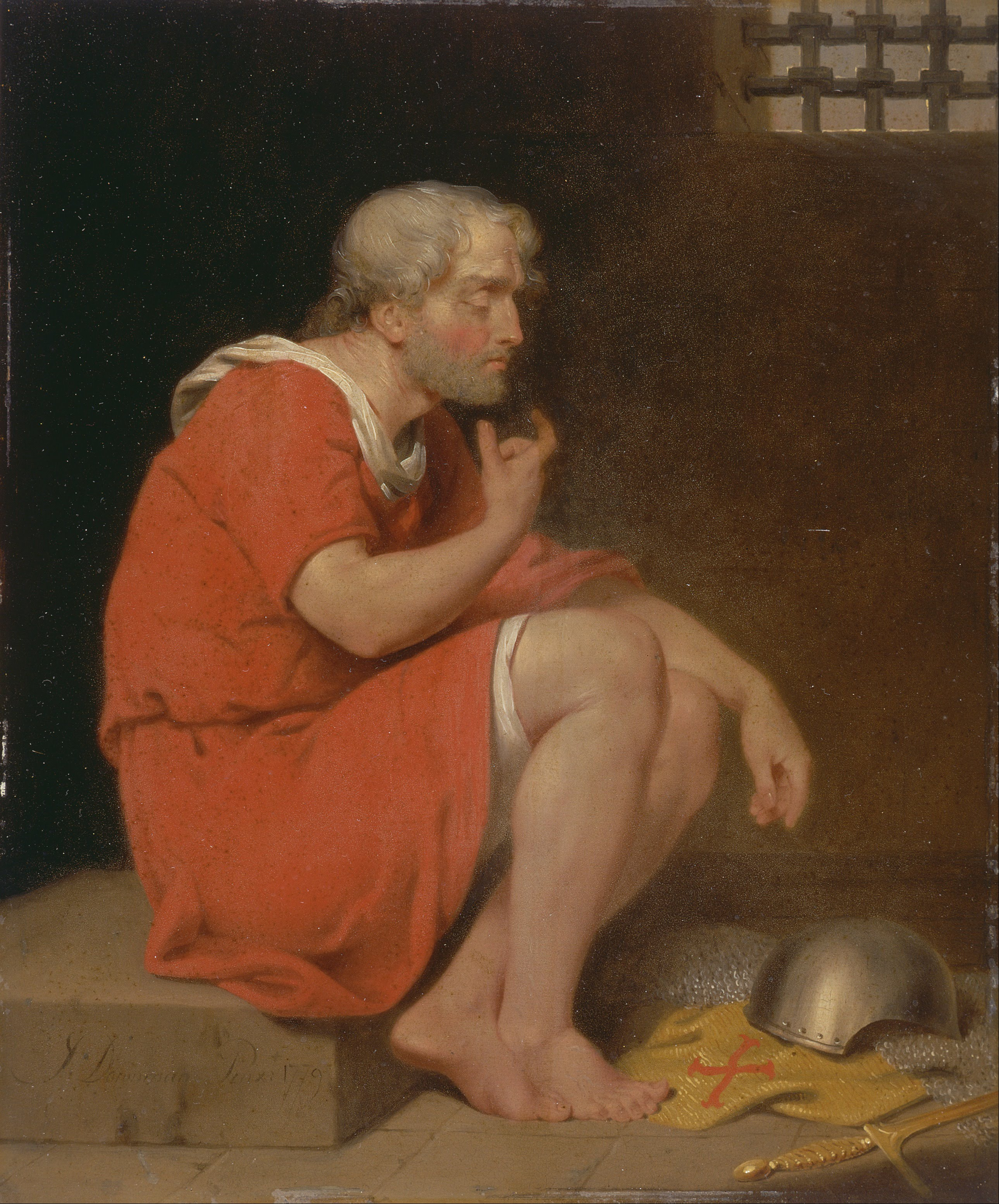
Robert, Duke of Normandy in Prison by John Downman

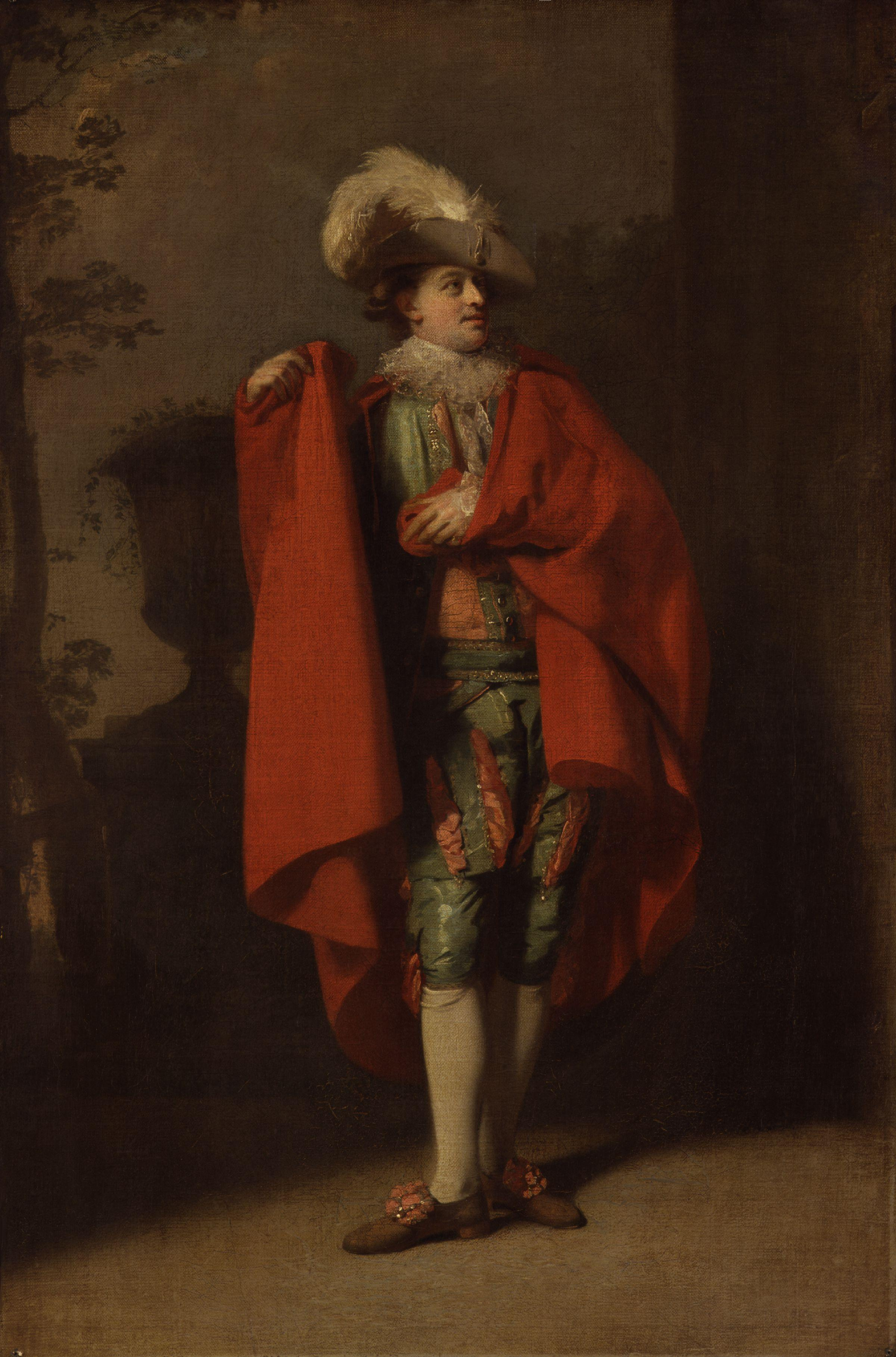
John Palmer in The Spanish Barber by Henry Walton

== See also ==
- Royal Academy Exhibition of 1780, the first to be held at Somerset House

== Bibliography ==
- Egerton, Judy. George Stubbs, Painter. Yale University Press, 2007.
- Hamilton, James. Gainsborough: A Portrait. Hachette UK, 2017.
- Kamensky, Jane. A Revolution in Color: The World of John Singleton Copley. W. W. Norton & Company, 2016.
- McIntyre, Ian. Joshua Reynolds: The Life and Times of the First President of the Royal Academy. Allen Lane, 2003.
