= Alfred the Great Dividing His Loaf with a Pilgrim =

Painting by Benjamin West

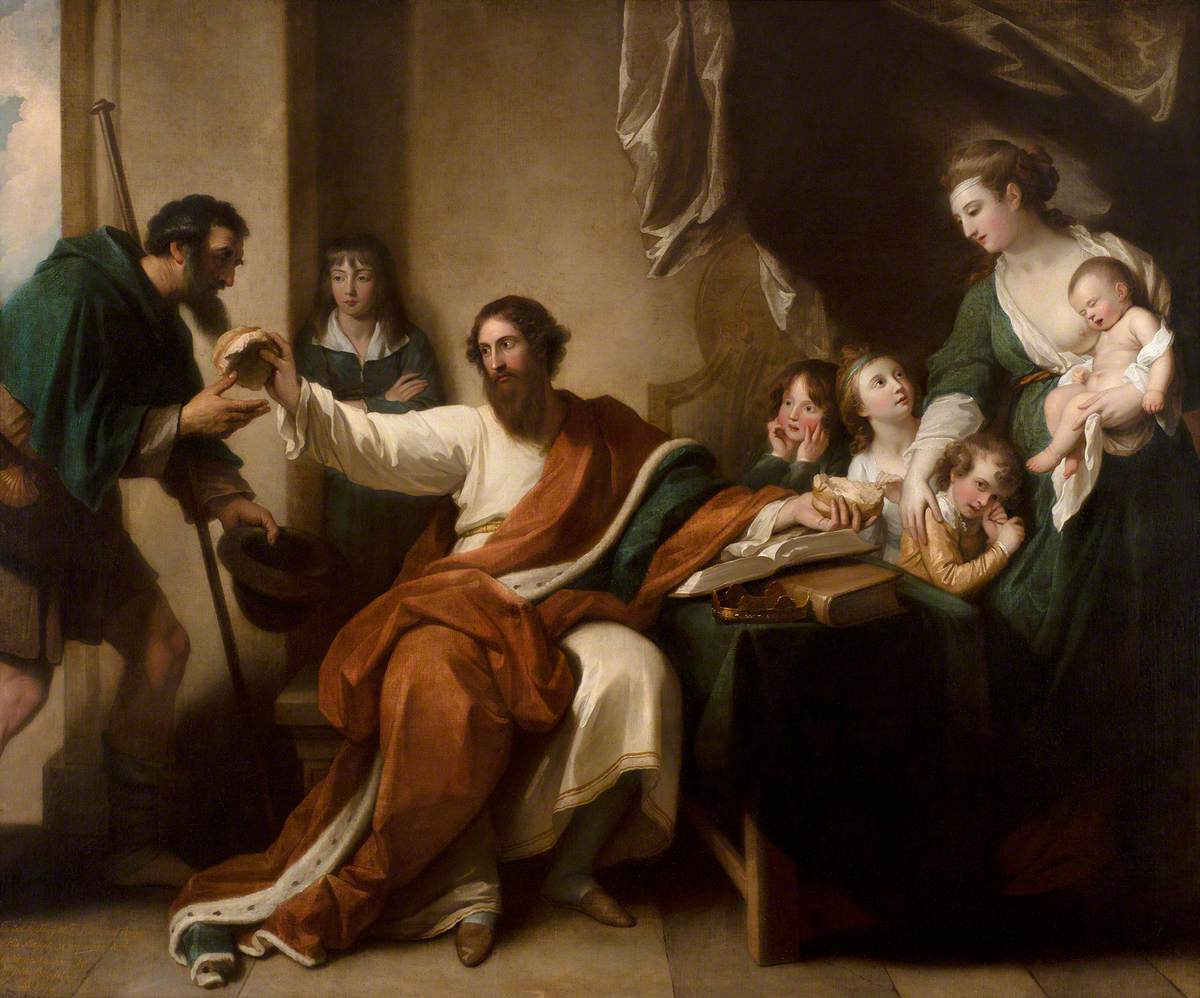
- Artist: Benjamin West
- Year: 1779
- Type: Oil on canvas, history painting
- Dimensions: 228.6 cm × 275.6 cm (90.0 in × 108.5 in)
- Location: Stationers' Hall, London

Alfred the Great Dividing His Loaf with a Pilgrim is a 1779 history painting by the American-British artist Benjamin West. It depicts a scene from the life of Alfred the Great, the ninth century Anglo-Saxon monarch. Alfred is shown sharing his last loaf of bread with a disguised St. Cuthbert in the village of Athelney in Somerset where the king and his family had fled from the Vikings. While there are a number of paintings and illustrations showing the more famous story of Alfred burning the cakes, this was the only one to show this alternative scene from his legend. West drew inspiration from the 1777 history book The Life of Alfred the Great by Alexander Bicknell. Showing Alfred breaking bread, West gave Alfred a Christ-like appearance that strongly influenced depictions of him in the nineteenth century.

The painting was commissioned by the publisher and politician John Boydell for the Stationers' Company of London. It was displayed at the Royal Academy Exhibition of 1779 held in Pall Mall. The image proved a popular one and Boydell produced several prints based after it, including a notable engraving by William Sharp. Today the painting still hangs at Stationers' Hall in the City of London.

== Bibliography ==
- Grossman, Lloyd. Benjamin West and the Struggle to be Modern. Merrell Publishers, 2015.
- Parker, Joanne. England's Darling: The Victorian Cult of Alfred the Great. : Manchester University Press, 2007.
- Smith, Anthony D. The Nation Made Real: Art and National Identity in Western Europe, 1600-1850. OUP Oxford, 2013.
