= Thomas Gainsborough's Cottage Door works =

Paintings by Thomas Gainsborough

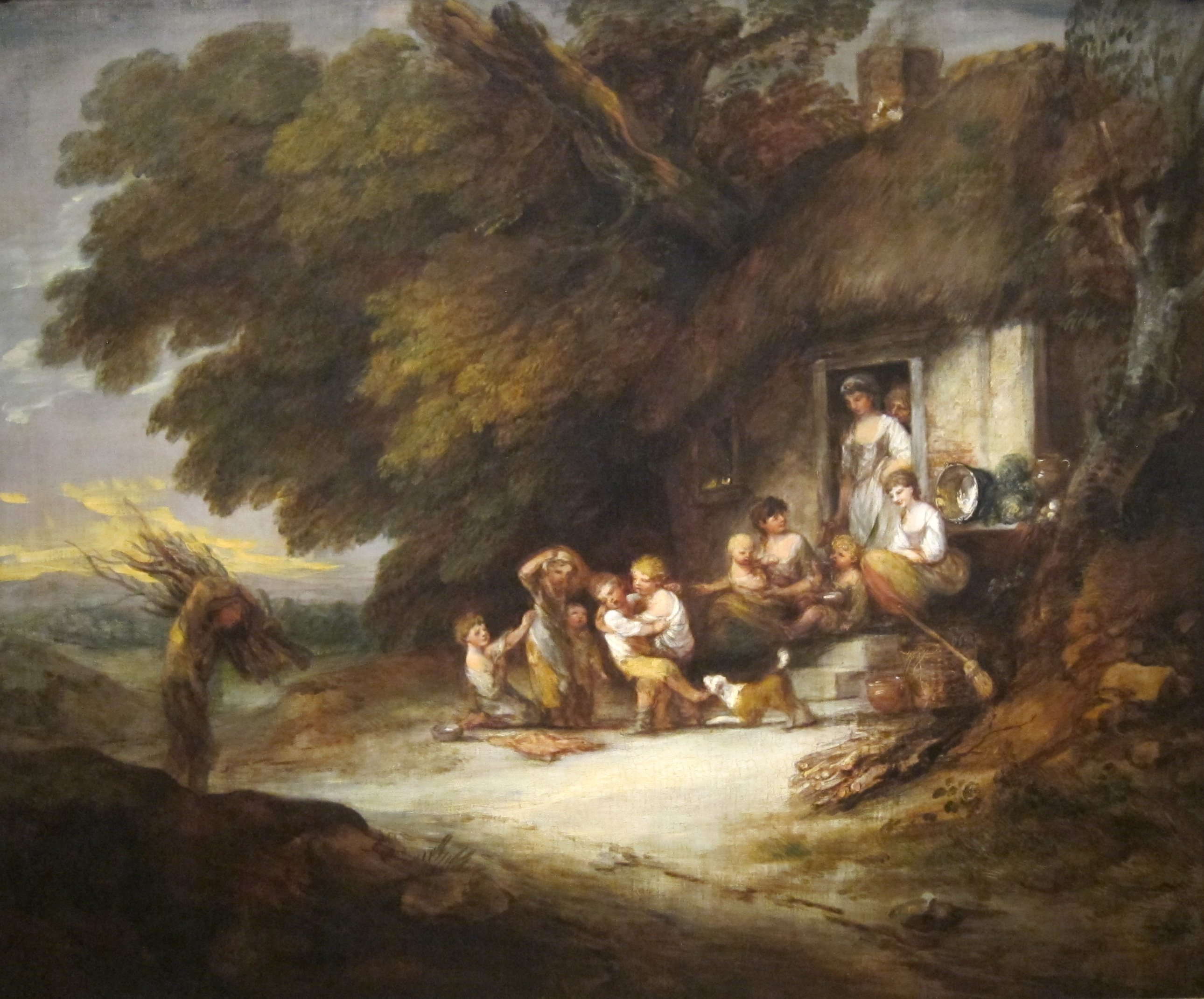
Hilly landscape with peasant family at a Cottage Door, Children playing and Woodcutter returning

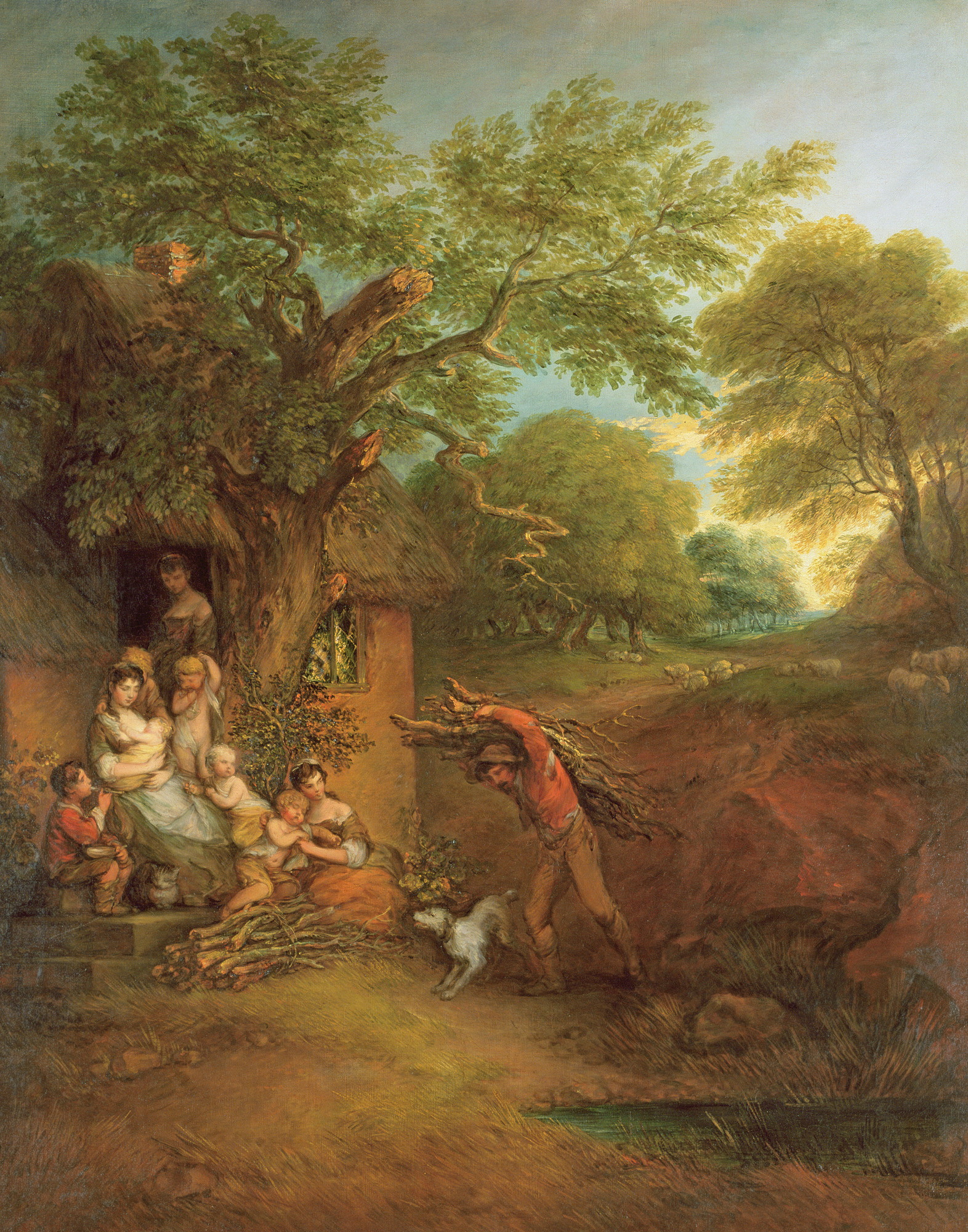
The Woodcutters Return

Thomas Gainsborough was the first British artist to employ cottages as a major subject, in what has become known as his "Cottage Door" paintings, painted during the final decades of his life; and was in the vanguard of a late 18th century fad of interest in them.

== History ==
During his period in Bath, Gainsborough wrote to William Jackson expressing his desire to retire to a cottage in the country, and expressed similar sentiments to Sir William Chambers. He is reported by various biographies to have bought a cottage in the country, albeit that there is significant disagreement as to exactly where, when later he lived in London. This idea of the rural retirement idyll was popular in Tory and Jacobite circles in Bath, and inspired his work on a series of paintings with a common theme, the cottage door.

There are five such paintings still extant with this as the primary theme, beginning with The Woodcutter's Return (c.1772–1774) and including his portrait of Mrs Scudamore, as well as numerous instances of cottages in his various landscapes. Others are Hilly landscape with peasant family at a Cottage Door, Children playing and Woodcutter returning (c.1778), The Cottage Door (1780), and Peasant smoking at a Cottage Door (1788).

The paintings all comprise family groupings in front of the door of an isolated cottage in the countryside, with idealized appearances: the mothers are young, improbably so to have borne as many children as are depicted, and the children cherubic. They are set in the evening, with the father of the family sometimes also present, with one exception depicted as returning from work, bent under the weight of the firewood that he carries. Gainsborough makes a contrast between the light toned figure of the mother and children at leisure, although sometimes the mother is depicted as holding a baby or carrying out domestic chores, and the struggling father painted in darker tones. The exception to the depiction of the father as burdened is in the final 1788 painting, where the father is depicted alongside the rest of the family, is in the same light tones, and is also youthful and handsome in appearance.
