= The Labourers =

Painting by George Stubbs

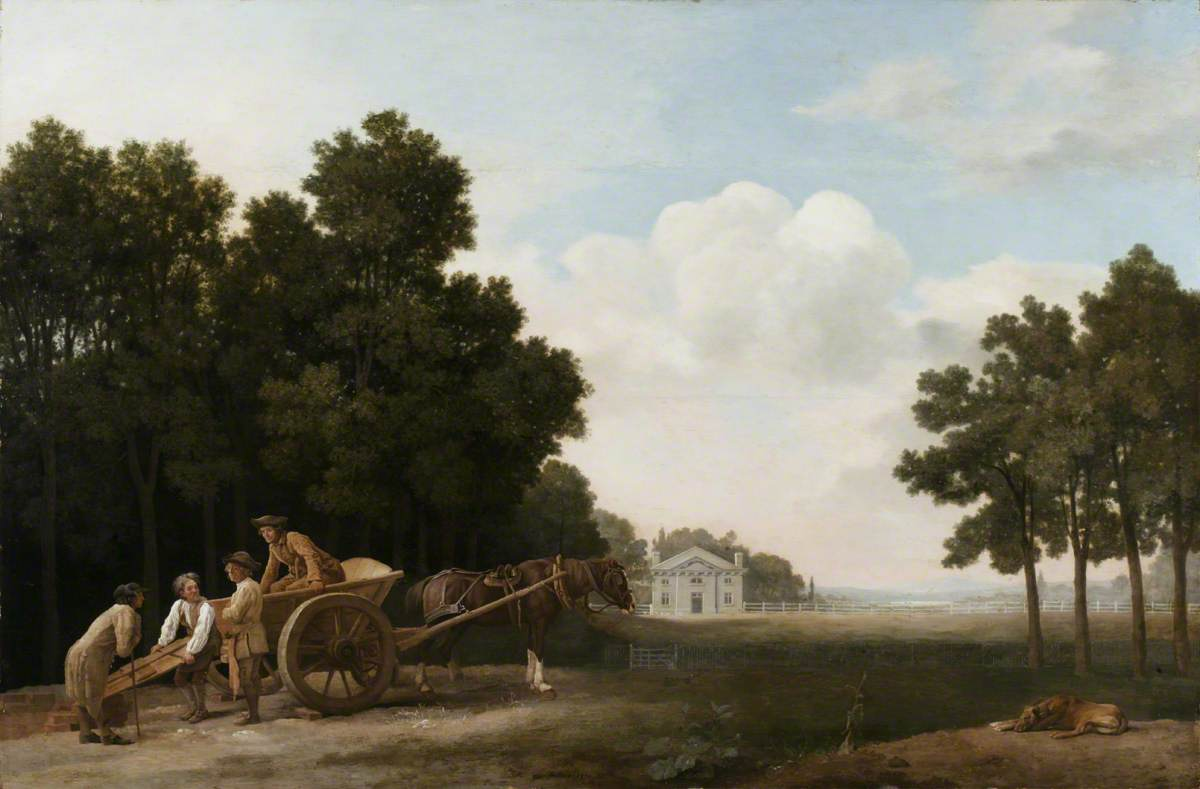
- Artist: George Stubbs
- Year: 1779
- Type: Oil on panel, genre painting
- Dimensions: 91.5 cm × 137 cm (36.0 in × 54 in)
- Location: Upton House, Warwickshire

The Labourers is an oil on panel painting by the British artist George Stubbs, from 1779. it is held in Upton House in Warwickshire.

== History and description ==
It depicts a group of labourers who have just unloaded some bricks from the back of a cart. The composition is divided in two, with the more old-fashioned traditions of the rural labourers on the left and the modern country estate with fencing and a new lodge on the right.

This was the second, much larger version, Stubbs produced of a similar scene with this title. The earlier work had been produced for Lord Torrington and made reference to the brickworks he had established at Southill in Bedfordshire. This later painting was displayed at the Royal Academy Exhibition of 1779 held at Somerset House in London, where it was well-received. Today the painting is in the collection of Upton House, in Warwickshire, overseen by the National Trust since 1948. Stubb s also produced a replica of this work on enamel for Josiah Wedgwood in 1781.

== Bibliography ==
- Egerton, Judy. George Stubbs, Painter. Yale University Press, 2007
- Kidson, Alex. George Stubbs: A Celebration. Tate Publishing, 2006.
