= Gypsy Encampment, Sunset =

Painting by Thomas Gainsborough

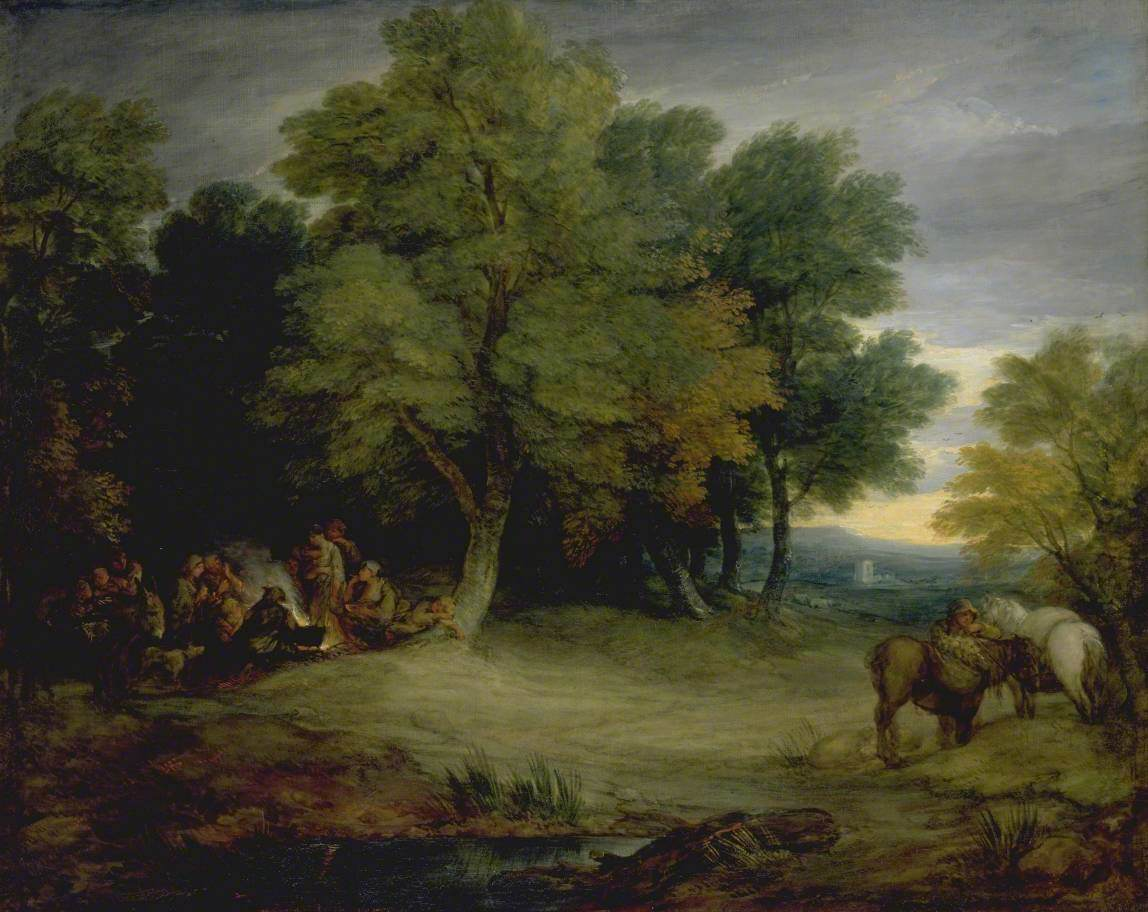
- Artist: Thomas Gainsborough
- Year: c. 1779
- Type: Oil on canvas, landscape painting
- Dimensions: 120.6 cm × 150.5 cm (47.5 in × 59.3 in)
- Location: Tate Britain, London

Gypsy Encampment, Sunset is an oil on canvas landscape painting by the British artist Thomas Gainsborough, from c. 1779.

== History and description ==
It features a scene in a rural English landscape. A group of gypsies are shown sitting down to dinner around a campfire. They are shown to the left of the composition with a clearing dominating the painting. A village church is seen in the distance.

Gainsborough had initially made his name painting in his native Suffolk. After a spell in the fashionable spa town Bath, he has relocated to London by the time he produced this painting. He returned to a theme he had originally explored in the 1750s, a group of travellers in an English landscape. While Gypsy themes were more common in Continental European art, Gainsborough was the first British artist to produce paintings in which they are the central focus.

The painting is now in the collection of the Tate Britain, in London, having been acquired in 1947.

== Bibliography ==
- Cressy, David. Gypsies: An English History. Oxford University Press, 2018
- Hamilton, James. Gainsborough: A Portrait. Hachette UK, 2017.
- Houghton-Walker, Sarah. Representations of the Gypsy in the Romantic Period. Oxford University Press, 2014.
- Humphreys, Richard. The Tate Britain Companion to British Art. Tate Publishing, 2001.
