= 1757 in art =

Events from the year 1757 in art.

== Events ==
- 3 February – French artist Robert Picault begins the rescue of the frescoes at the King's Chamber of the Palace of Fontainebleau before architect Ange-Jacques Gabrel begins renovations.
- 25 August – The Salon of 1757 opens at the Louvre in Paris

== Works ==
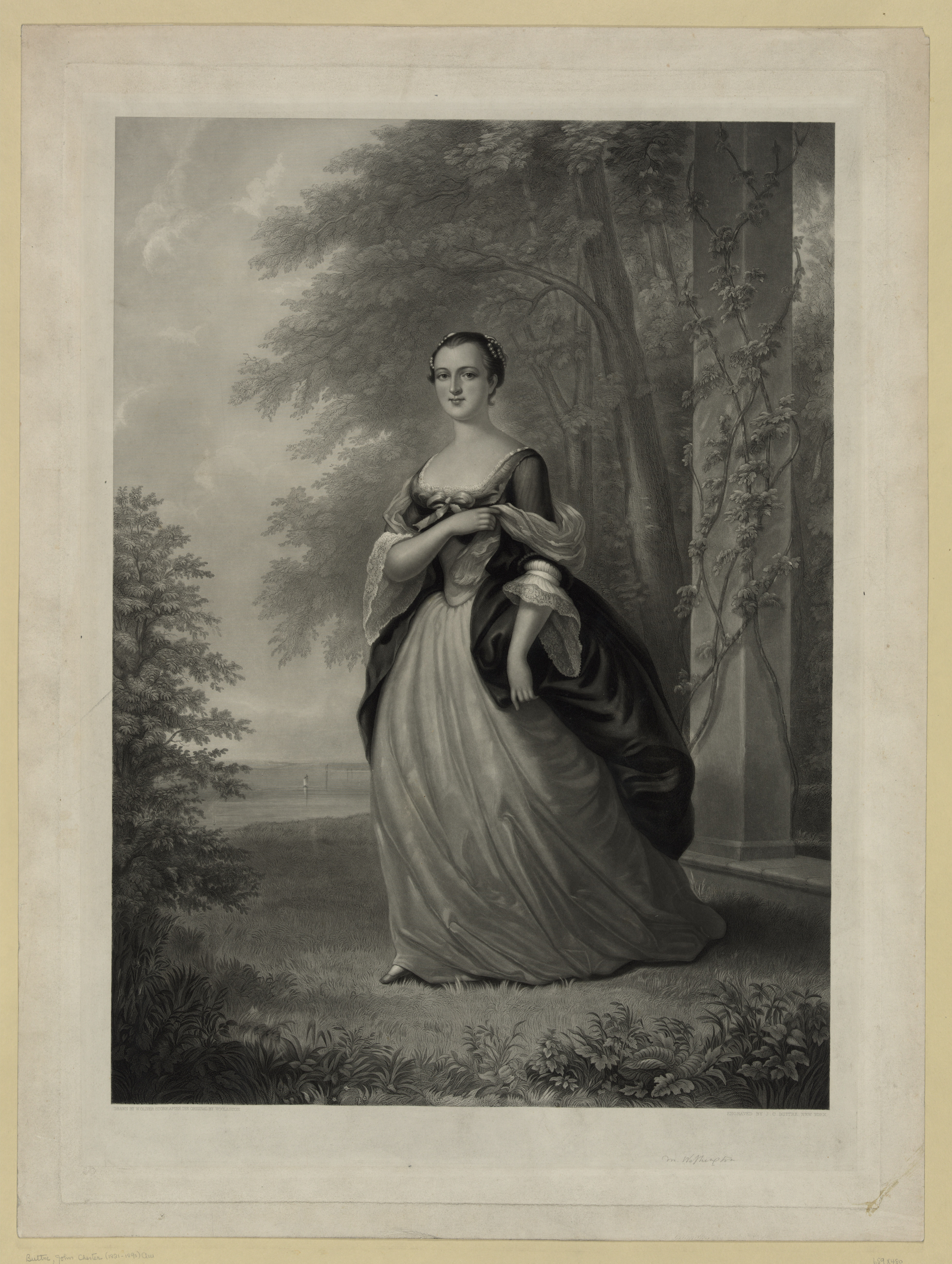
Mezzotint (1863) of Martha Washington made by John Chester Buttre, drawn by W. Oliver Stone after the original by John Wollaston, painted in 1757

- Giovanni Battista Cipriani – Decoration of Lord Mayor of London's State Coach
- Arthur Devis
  - Arthur Holdsworth Conversing with Thomas Taylor and Captain Stancombe by the River Dart
  - Portrait of Juliana Penn
- Anton Raphael Mengs – The Judgement of Paris (approximate date)
- Giovanni Paolo Panini – Modern Rome (first two versions)
- Joshua Reynolds – Miss Margaret Morris
- Claude Joseph Vernet – View of Avignon from the Right Bank of the Rhone
- John Wollaston – Portraits made in Virginia, including
  - Martha Dandridge Custis (illustrated)
  - Mann Page and his sister Elizabeth (approximate date)

== Births ==
- January 10 - Joseph Kreutzinger, Austrian portrait painter (died 1829)
- January 23 - Paolo Vincenzo Bonomini, Italian portrait and caricature painter (died 1839)
- March 21 – James Sowerby, naturalist and illustrator (died 1822)
- April 22 – Josef Grassi, Austrian portrait painter (died 1838)
- July 24 – Vladimir Borovikovsky, Ukrainian-born painter especially of Russian portraiture (died 1825)
- August 4 – Guillaume-Joseph Roques, painter (died 1847)
- August 17 – Adam Bartsch, Austrian scholar, artist, and printmaker in engraving and etching (died 1821)
- November 1 – Antonio Canova, sculptor (died 1822)
- November 28 – William Blake, English painter, poet and engraver (died 1827)
- December 2 – Pierre Cartellier, French sculptor (died 1831)
- December 5 – Jean-Pierre Casimir de Marcassus, Baron de Puymaurin, French chemist, medallist, politician, and man of letters (died 1841)
- date unknown
  - John Alefounder, English portrait and miniature painter (died 1795)
  - Joseph Barber, English landscape painter and art teacher (died 1811)
  - Gaetano Stefano Bartolozzi, Italian engraver, art dealer, and merchant (died 1821)
  - Alexandre-Hyacinthe Dunouy, French landscape painter (died 1841)
  - Vicente Escobar, Cuban painter (died 1834)
  - Abraham Ezekiel Ezekiel, English engraver (died 1806)
  - Thomas Hardy, English portrait painter (died c. 1805))
  - Nathaniel Plimer, miniaturist (died 1822)
  - Mustafa Râkim, Ottoman calligrapher (died 1826)
  - Sampson Towgood Roch, Irish painter of miniatures (died 1847)
  - William Verstille, American portrait artist (died 1803)

== Deaths ==
- February 26 - Maria Moninckx, Dutch botanical artist and painter (born 1673)
- February 27 – Pier Francesco Guala, Italian painter active in Casale Monferrato (born 1698)
- March 12 – Giuseppe Galli Bibiena (born 1696), Italian designer, second son of Ferdinando Galli Bibiena, most distinguished artist of the Galli-Bibiena family
- April 15
  - Rosalba Carriera, Venetian miniaturist (born 1675)
  - Franz Joseph Spiegler, German fresco painter (born 1691)
- April 16 – Daniel Gran, Austrian painter of frescoes and altar paintings (born 1694)
- June 26 – Jan Antonín Vocásek, Czech Baroque still-life painter (born 1706)
- August 5 – Antoine Pesne, French-born court painter of Prussia (born 1683)
- August 6 – Ádám Mányoki, Hungarian Baroque painter (born 1673)
- September 3 - Odvardt Helmoldt von Lode, Danish painter and engraver (born 1726)
- September 21 - Pieter Jan Snyers, Flemish painter (born 1696)
- October 21 (bur.) - Rhoda Delaval, English portrait painter (born 1725)
- date unknown
  - Francesco Albotto, Italian painter (born 1721)
  - Francesco Ange, Italian painter (born 1675)
  - Erik Westzynthius the Elder, Finnish painter (born 1711)
  - Antonio Maria Zanetti, Italian artist especially of woodcuts (born 1680)
