= 1726 in art =

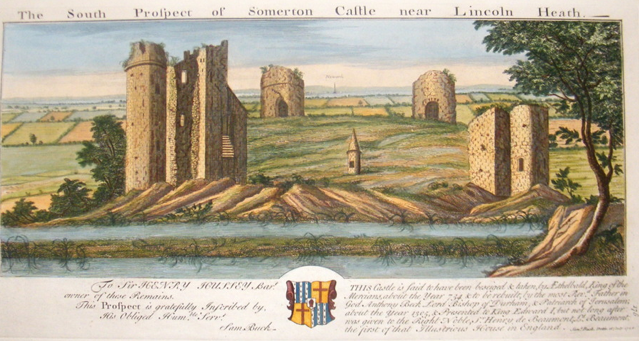

Events from the year 1726 in art.

== Events ==
- A silver statue of the Annunciation is sculpted in Augsburg for Mariánská Týnice, on the order of Abbot Eugen Tittl; it was later melted down for coins, along with the rest of the church's treasures.

== Paintings ==
- Elias Gottlob Haussmann – Gottfried Reiche
- Sebastiano Ricci
  - Moses make water gush from the rock
  - Susanna in front of Daniel
- Johann Heinrich Tischbein – Portrait of the Artist's first Wife, Marie Sophie Robert

== Births ==
- February 7 – Margaret Fownes-Luttrell, English painter (died 1766)
- March 24 – Johanna Marie Fosie, Danish painter and first professional native female artist in Denmark (died 1764)
- April 18 (baptised) – François-Thomas Germain, French silversmith (died 1791)
- May 1 – Antonio Zucchi, Italian painter of the Neoclassic period (died 1795)
- May 20
  - Francis Cotes, English painter (died 1770)
  - Gabriel François Doyen, French painter (died 1806)
- August 24 - Peter Cramer, Danish book illustrator, decorative and theatrical painter (died 1782)
- October 15 – Françoise Duparc, Spanish born Baroque painter who later lived in France (died 1778)
- October 16 – Daniel Chodowiecki, Polish painter (died 1801)
- November 30 – Jacques Aliamet, French engraver (died 1788)
- date unknown
  - John Baker, English flower painter (died 1771)
  - Michel-Bruno Bellengé, French painter (died 1793)
  - Katsukawa Shunshō, Japanese painter and printmaker in the ukiyo-e style (died 1792)
  - François-Gaspard Teuné, French ébéniste (cabinet-maker) (died 1788)
- probable
  - Giovanni Battista Brostoloni, Italian engraver (died unknown)
  - Odvardt Helmoldt von Lode, Danish painter and engraver (died 1757)

== Deaths ==
- February 15 – Teodoro Ardemans, Spanish architect and painter (born unknown)
- February 18 – Jacques Carrey, French painter and draughtsman (born 1649)
- April 13 – Antonio Palomino, Spanish painter, writer on art theory, and biographer of artists (born 1653)
- May 9 – Sébastien Slodtz, French sculptor (born 1655)
- August 13 – Anthoni Schoonjans, Belgian painter (born 1655)
- August 29 – Antonio Bellucci (or Antonijus Belutis), painter from Treviso (born 1654)
- October 10 – Tommaso Redi, Italian painter, active in his native Florence (born 1665)
- November 15 – Giacomo del Po, Italian painter of emblematical and allegorical subjects (born 1654)
- November 22 – Anton Domenico Gabbiani, Italian painter born in Florence (born 1652)
- December 14 – François Dumont, French sculptor (born 1688)
- date unknown
  - François Barois, French sculptor (born 1656)
  - Jiao Bingzhen, Chinese painter of the Qing dynasty (born 1689)
  - Gregorio De Ferrari, Italian painter of the Genoese school (born 1647)
  - Girolamo Gatti, Italian painter (born 1682)
  - Pier Lorenzo Spoleti, Italian painter of portraits and reproductions of old masters (born 1680)
