= 1788 in art =

Events from the year 1788 in art.

== Events ==
- 28 April – The Royal Academy Exhibition of 1788 opens at Somerset House in London
- Étienne Maurice Falconet becomes director of the Académie des beaux-arts.

== Works ==
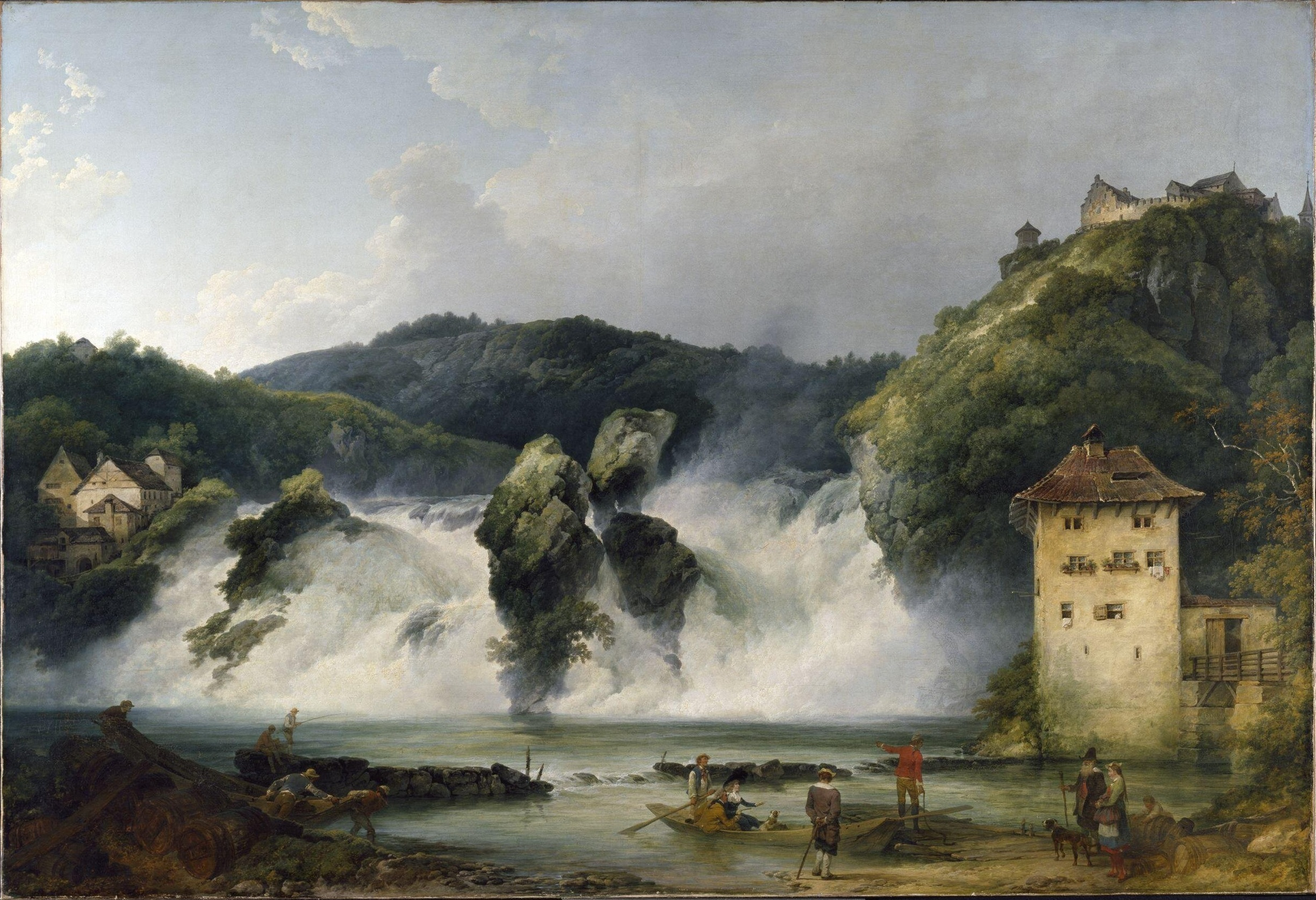
The Falls of the Rhine at Schaffhausen by Philip James de Loutherbourg

- Thomas Barrett – Charlotte Medal
- James Barry – King Lear Weeping over the Dead Body of Cordelia
- Jacques-Louis David – Portrait of Antoine-Laurent Lavoisier and his Wife
- Marguerite Gérard – First Steps (approximate date)
- Francisco Goya
  - Manuel Osorio Manrique de Zuñiga ("Red Boy", 1787–88)
  - The Meadow of San Isidro
  - St. Francis of Borja Attending a Dying Man
- Anton Graff – Thomas Bruce, 7th Earl of Elgin
- Guillaume Guillon-Lethière - Brutus Condemning His Sons to Death
- Johann Zoffany – Colonel Mordaunt's Cock Match

== Births ==
- February 5 – Sarah Goodridge, American painter who specialized in miniatures (died 1853)
- February 24 – Johan Christian Dahl, Norwegian landscape painter (died 1857)
- February 29 – Catharine Hermine Kølle, Norwegian adventurer and painter (died 1859)
- March 12 – Pierre Jean David, sculptor and engraver ("David d'Angers") (died 1856)
- April 5 – Franz Pforr, painter (died 1812)
- April 18 – Charles de Steuben, French painter active during the Napoleonic Era (died 1856)
- April 20 – Emma Körner, German painter (died 1815)
- April 24 – Ammi Phillips, American painter (died 1865)
- June 18 - Ernesta Legnani Bisi, Italian painter and engraver (died 1859)
- September 8 – William Collins, English landscape and genre painter (died 1847)
- August 6 – Felix Slade, founder of the Slade School of Art (died 1868)
- November 4 – Jacques-Édouard Gatteaux, French sculptor and medal engraver (died 1881)
- November 28 – Kikuchi Yōsai – Japanese painter most famous for his monochrome portraits of historical figures (died 1878)
- date unknown
  - Michele Bisi, Italian engraver and painter (date of death unknown)
  - Albertus Jonas Brandt, Dutch still-life painter (died 1821)
  - Martin Cregan, Irish portrait painter (died 1870)
  - John Watson Gordon, painter (died 1864)
  - Michael Hanhart, British lithographer and chromolithographer (died 1865)
  - Mary Harrison, English flower and fruit painter, and illustrator (died 1875)
  - Emma Eleonora Kendrick, British miniature painter (died 1871)
  - Paolo Toschi, Italian draughtsman and engraver (died 1854)
  - William Edward West, American portrait painter (died 1859)

== Deaths ==
- February 17 – Maurice Quentin de La Tour, French Rococo portraitist who worked primarily with pastels (born 1704)
- March 2 – Salomon Gessner, Swiss painter and poet (born 1730)
- May 29 – Jacques Aliamet, French engraver (born 1726)
- July 15 – Jean Germain Drouais, French historical painter (born 1763)
- August 2 – Thomas Gainsborough, English portrait painter (born 1727)
- September 27 – Sir Robert Taylor, stonemason, sculptor, and architect (born 1714)
- September 30 – Matthäus Günther, German painter and artist of the Baroque and Rococo era (born 1705)
- December 30 – Francesco Zuccarelli, Italian Rococo painter, elected in 1763 to the Venetian Academy of Fine Arts (born 1702)
- date unknown
  - Fabio Berardi, Italian engraver (born 1728)
  - Joseph Bergler the Elder, Austrian sculptor (born 1718)
  - Carlo Bonavia, Italian veduta painter (date of birth unknown)
  - Gaspard Duché de Vancy, French painter and drawer (born 1756)
  - George Farington, English artist (born 1752)
  - Toriyama Sekien, scholar and ukiyo-e artist of Japanese folklore (born 1712)
  - François-Gaspard Teuné, French ébéniste (cabinet-maker) (born 1726)
  - Min Zhen, Chinese painter and seal carver born in Nanchang in Jiangxi (born 1730)
