= Bonavia =

Bonavia or Bonavía is an Italian surname. Notable people with the surname include:

- Carlo Bonavia (d. 1788), Italian painter
- Emanuel Bonavia (1826–1908), physician and naturalist in British India
- Ferruccio Bonavia (1877–1950), Italian-English writer on music and composer
- Giuseppe Bonavia (1821–1885), Maltese draughtsman and architect
- Kevin Bonavia (born 1977), British politician
- Maria Luisa Carranque y Bonavía, Spanish noblewoman and painter
- Santiago Bonavía (1700–1760), Italian architect and painter
- Victor Bonavia (1893–1948), Maltese cricketer, physician and British Army officer
