= Richard Hoogenboom =

- Born: 3 March 1978 (age 48); Rotterdam, Netherlands
- Education: Eindhoven University of Technology
- Known for: Poly(2-oxazoline)s
- Scientific career
- Fields: Polymer chemistry
- Workplaces: Ghent University
- Doctoral advisor: Ulrich S. Schubert

Richard Hoogenboom (born 3 March 1978) is a Dutch polymer chemist. He is a senior full professor at Ghent University, where he heads the Supramolecular Chemistry group in the Department of Organic and Macromolecular Chemistry. His work focuses on poly(2-oxazoline)s, responsive polymers and supramolecular materials.

Hoogenboom completed his PhD at Eindhoven University of Technology in 2005 and moved to Ghent University in 2010. He has been editor-in-chief of European Polymer Journal since 2019, and in 2018 he founded Avroxa, a Ghent University spin-off that sells poly(2-oxazoline)s under the name Ultroxa. He received the American Chemical Society Carl S. Marvel Award for Creative Polymer Chemistry in 2021 and was elected a member of the Academia Europaea in 2025.

== Early life and education ==
Hoogenboom was born on 3 March 1978 in Rotterdam. He completed an MSc in chemistry and chemical engineering at Eindhoven University of Technology in 2001. He obtained a PhD in organic and polymer chemistry at the same institution on 14 November 2005, under Ulrich S. Schubert.

His doctoral research applied two techniques from other branches of chemistry to polymer synthesis: high-throughput experimentation, in which a robot runs many reactions in parallel, and microwave irradiation as a heating method. Combining the two reduced the synthesis time for poly(2-oxazoline)s from around twenty hours to two minutes.

== Career ==
From 2005 to 2008 Hoogenboom was a project leader for the Dutch Polymer Institute in Eindhoven. From 2007 he combined this with part-time work as a senior product developer at the medical device company Dolphys Medical. He then moved to RWTH Aachen University as an Alexander von Humboldt fellow with Martin Möller. A Veni grant took him to Roeland Nolte's group at Radboud University Nijmegen the following year.

Ghent University appointed him associate professor in 2010 on a research professorship. He was promoted to full professor in October 2014 and to senior full professor in 2022.

In 2018 he founded Avroxa, a Ghent University spin-off where he is scientific advisor.

== Research ==
Hoogenboom works on poly(2-oxazoline)s, polymers made by cationic ring-opening polymerization of 2-oxazoline monomers. A 2009 review he wrote in Angewandte Chemie surveyed the synthesis and applications of the class. Poly(2-oxazoline)s have been studied as a substitute for polyethylene glycol in drug delivery, which he and co-authors reviewed in 2010. His group reported a route to poly(2-oxazoline)s of defined high molar mass in 2018.

Working with the Ghent organic chemist Johan Winne, Hoogenboom's group reported the first synthesis and characterization of tetrahydrooxazepine in 2018, a seven-membered cyclic imino ether.

A second line of work concerns thermoresponsive polymers, whose solubility in water changes with temperature. He has published on polymers with an upper critical solution temperature in mixtures of alcohol and water and, with Schubert and others, on how the lower critical solution temperature should be measured and reported. In 2013 he was a co-author of a paper in Nature on thermoresponsive hydrogels formed from polyisocyanopeptides.

The group also works on hydrogels and functional coatings. With colleagues at Radboud University Medical Center and the company GATT Technologies, Hoogenboom described hemostatic patches based on N-hydroxysuccinimide-ester functionalized poly(2-oxazoline)s in 2017.

In 2014 the group used a laboratory robot capable of running sixteen parallel reactions to optimise a copper-mediated radical polymerisation of hydrophobic acrylates, work that C2W covered at the time. Fluorinated poly(2-oxazoline)s from the group have been applied as fluorine-19 magnetic resonance imaging contrast agents. The group has also made halochromic materials for pH sensing and X-ray scintillating composites. With groups at KU Leuven and Lancaster University he contributed to a single-molecule-thick cyclodextrin coating for electrochemical sensors, reported in 2019.

== Editorial and advisory work ==
Hoogenboom was an associate editor of European Polymer Journal and became its editor-in-chief in 2019. He was an associate editor of Australian Journal of Chemistry until 2025. He sits on the advisory boards of Chem and Macromolecular Rapid Communications.

== Awards and honours ==
- Fellow of the Royal Society of Chemistry (2012)
- Polymer Chemistry Lectureship, Royal Society of Chemistry (2015)
- Polymer International–IUPAC Award for Creativity in Applied Polymer Science (2016)
- Carl S. Marvel Award for Creative Polymer Chemistry, ACS (2021)
- Fellow of the ACS Division of Polymer Chemistry (2022)
- Fellow of the ACS Division of Polymeric Materials: Science and Engineering (2025)
- Member of the Academia Europaea (2025)

== Selected publications ==
=== Books ===
- Hoogenboom, Richard; Schubert, Ulrich S.; Wiesbrock, Frank, eds. (2016). Microwave-assisted Polymer Synthesis. Advances in Polymer Science. Vol. 274. Springer. doi:10.1007/978-3-319-42241-1. ISBN 978-3-319-42239-8.
- Singha, Nikhil K.; Mondal, Prantik; Hoogenboom, Richard, eds. (2024). Click Chemistry in Polymer Science: Designs to Applications. Polymer Chemistry Series. Vol. 39. Royal Society of Chemistry. ISBN 978-1-83916-707-2.
- Section editor (volume 1, with Nikhil K. Singha), Comprehensive Polymer Science, 3rd edition, Elsevier, 2024.

=== Articles ===
- Hoogenboom, Richard (2009). "Poly(2-oxazoline)s: a polymer class with numerous potential applications". Angewandte Chemie International Edition. 48 (43): 7978–7994. doi:10.1002/anie.200901607. PMID 19768817.
- Kouwer, Paul H. J.; Koepf, Matthieu; et al. (2013). "Responsive biomimetic networks from polyisocyanopeptide hydrogels". Nature. 493 (7434): 651–655. Bibcode:2013Natur.493..651K. doi:10.1038/nature11839. hdl:2066/111406. PMID 23354048.
- Bouten, Pieter J. M.; Hertsen, Dries; et al. (2015). "Accelerated living cationic ring-opening polymerization of a methyl ester functionalized 2-oxazoline monomer". Polymer Chemistry. 6 (4): 514–518. doi:10.1039/C4PY01373E.
- de la Rosa, Victor R.; Zhang, Zhiyue; De Geest, Bruno G.; Hoogenboom, Richard (2015). "Colorimetric logic gates based on poly(2-alkyl-2-oxazoline)-coated gold nanoparticles". Advanced Functional Materials. 25 (17): 2511. Bibcode:2015AdvFM..25.2511D. doi:10.1002/adfm.201404560.
- Zhang, Qilu; Hou, Zhiyue; et al. (2015). "Acid-labile thermoresponsive copolymers that combine fast pH-triggered hydrolysis and high stability under neutral conditions". Angewandte Chemie International Edition. 54 (37): 10879–10883. doi:10.1002/anie.201505145. PMID 26212481.
- Xu, Xiaowen; Jerca, Florica A.; Jerca, Valentin V.; Hoogenboom, Richard (2019). "Covalent poly(2-isopropenyl-2-oxazoline) hydrogels with ultrahigh mechanical strength and toughness through secondary terpyridine metal-coordination crosslinks". Advanced Functional Materials. 29 (48) 1904886. Bibcode:2019AdvFM..2904886X. doi:10.1002/adfm.201904886.
