= Internationale Junge Orchesterakademie =

Germany-based youth orchestra

The Internationale Junge Orchesterakademie (IJOA), or International Youth Orchestra Academy, is an international range orchestra for young people, based in Pleystein, Bavaria. It has special associations with the Bayreuth Easter Festival. The Kultur- und Sozialstiftung Internationale Junge Orchesterakademie (Cultural and Social Foundation International Young Orchestra Academy) is a charitable foundation under the auspices of the IJOA. The aims of the foundation are to help and support children suffering from cancer; the promotion of culture—especially music; and promotion of international understanding. The musicians, who come from different backgrounds from all over the world, meet to make music and play together in one orchestra.

== History ==
Since 1994, the Cultural and Social Foundation International Young Orchestra Academy foundation annually presents charity concerts at Easter. This is in conjunction with the Bayreuther Osterfestival, the Osterfestival Nördliche Oberpfalz, and remote concerts presented in Selb and Bielefeld for the benefit of children suffering from cancer. The foundation was founded by its current chairman, Prof. Dr. Ulrich S. Schubert, and Dr. Andreas Göldel, in co-operation with director August Everding and Australian conductor Sir Charles Mackerras. Every year, the orchestra accepts applications for approximately 110 young musicians from over 30 nations worldwide. The foundation has three main aims: primarily to help and support children suffering from cancer; secondly, to give young talented musicians from all over the world the ability to study and make music together; and, thirdly, to promote musical cultures. All the proceeds from the concerts go to support charity.

In 2007, a curatorship of the Young Orchestra Academy foundation was created. Members include: Peter Hahne, deputy director of ZDF television, Berlin; stage director Katharina Wagner; Prof. Claus Hipp, a freelance artist; Dagmar Wöhrl, parliamentary undersecretary at the Ministry of Economic Affairs & Technology; and, Dr. Manfred Spindler, Degussa Corporation board member.

== Workshops ==
In workshops lasting two weeks, the intended concert programme is studied by the young musicians in their orchestral sections, under the guidance of coaches who are themselves renowned musicians. The coaches are drawn from the Musik Hochschule in Cologne, the Gewandhausorchester Leipzig, the ROS Frankfurt-am-Main, the Munich Philharmonic Orchestra, and the Polish National Radio Symphony Orchestra.

During the two weeks' workshop, the players then also come together in tutti rehearsals with the conductor. The conductors include Miguel Ángel Gómez Martínez, Christoph Ulrich Meier and Bob Ross. Since the foundation, the Orchestra has given about 260 concerts in Germany and Europe. The programme usually includes (among other works) a great symphonic piece of the 19th century.

The young musicians also have the opportunity to play in the opera orchestra—the Bayreuth Easter Festival presented an opera for the first time in 2007, conducted and directed by Christoph Ulrich Meier—or at Festival-Brass (directed and conducted by Bob Ross, Blechschaden). In addition, there are Jazz and Salon orchestra workshops.

Scholarships

Talented musicians who cannot afford to participate in the Academy have the opportunity to obtain a scholarship. Most of the scholarships are made possible by the Friends of the Bayreuth Easter Festival ("Freunde des Bayreuther Osterfestivals e.V").

== Performance and recording ==
After the workshop the IJOA orchestra goes on tour. The pieces studied during the workshop will be played, among other places, in Bayreuth's Margravial Opera House; Selb's Rosenthal-Theatre; Leipzig's Thomaskirche; and Bielefeld's Neustädter Marienkirche.

The Internationale Junge Orchesterakademie records its concert program professionally. Since 2006 the recordings are made in co-production with the Bayerischer Rundfunk (Bavarian Broadcasting). The proceeds of the CD are applied to the purposes of the social and cultural foundation of the Internationale Junge Orchesterakademie.

== CDs ==
- CD 2007 Tchaikowsky Symphony No 5; J.S. Bach – Violin concerto in A minor (BWV 1041) (Co-production with the Bayerischer Rundfunk).
- CD 2006 Bruckner – Symphony No 7 (Co-production with the Bayerischer Rundfunk).
- CD 2005 Bruckner – Symphony No 4; Wagner – Prelude to Tannhäuser.
- CD 2004 Mahler – Symphony No 2, "Resurrection."
- CD 2003 Wagner – Overture to Lohengrin; Mahler – "Adagio" from Symphony No 5; Tchaikowsky – Symphony No 4.
- CD 2003 Salon orchestra and Jazz.
- CD 2002 Wagner – Overture to Tannhäuser; Mahler – Songs from Des Knaben Wunderhorn; Dvořák – Symphony No 8.
- CD 2001 Wagner – Overture to Der fliegende Holländer; Mahler – Songs from Des Knaben Wunderhorn; Brahms – Hungarian Dance No. 5; Dvořák – Symphony No 9, From the New World.
- CD 2000 Wagner, Tchaikowsky, Mahler, Grieg, William Byrd, Hazell, Premru.
- CD 1999 Mozart – Overture to The Magic Flute; Mahler – Rückert-Lieder; Tchaikowsky – Symphony No 6.
- CD 1997 Mahler – Symphony No 4; Felix Mendelssohn-Bartholdy – Violin concerto in E minor.
- CD 1996 Mahler – Symphony No 5
- CD 1995 Brahms – Academic Festival Overture; Mahler – Symphony No. 1, The Titan.

== See also ==
- List of youth orchestras
