= Bayreuther Osterfestival =

The Bayreuther Osterfestival is an Easter Festival held at Bayreuth in Germany. It has the three aims of raising money for cancer charities, providing experience and opportunities for young musicians, and the promotion of international understanding. It is connected with the work of the International Youth Orchestra Academy, and was founded in 1994.

== History ==
The Bayreuther Osterfestival was founded by Prof. Dr. Ulrich S. Schubert and Dr. Andreas Göldel in co-operation with director Prof. August Everding and the Australian conductor Sir Charles Mackerras. The Festival, with its charity concerts for the benefit of children who suffer from cancer, takes place every year at Easter. The festival started with the symphonic concerts of the Internationale Junge Orchesterakademie and now its program ranges from symphonic and chamber orchestra concerts to organ music, festival brass, jazz and salonorchestra concerts. In 2007 the genre opera has been added to the festival’s program for the first time, with Antonio Salieri’s “Prima la musica e poi le parole”. Musical Director and conductor of the opera was Christoph Ulrich Meier. The opera, the symphonic concerts and the festival brass (directed and conducted by Bob Ross) take place at the Margravial Opera House in Bayreuth (Germany).

Musical director of the festival is Prof. Dr. Ulrich S. Schubert. Responsible body of the Bayreuther Osterfestival is the social- and cultural foundation Internationale Junge Orchesterakademie. Administrative centre of the foundation is Playstein (Germany). Besides the Bayreuther Osterfestival and the Osterfestival Nördliche Oberpfalz the foundation presents and organizes also the Internationale Junge Orchesterakademie, a range orchestra of young musicians from all over the world who, in a two weeks workshop, study a symphonic program and since 2007, with a smaller orchestra, an opera. With this program the young musicians go on tour. In the last years the orchestra of the IJOA had guest performances in Bayreuth (Margravial Opera House), Weiden (Max-Reger-Halle), Selb (Rosenthal-Theater), Leipzig (Thomaskirche) und Bielefeld (Neustädter Marienkirche). Since 2004 Miguel Gómez-Martínez conducts the IJOA orchestra.

Sponsoring makes it possible for the Bayreuther Osterfestival to donate all the proceeds of the concerts for the benefit of children suffering from cancer at the children’s hospital in Bayreuth (Germany).

Main Sponsors of the Bayreuther Osterfestival are the VR Bank in Bayreuth (Germany), Motor Nützel Group Bayreuth (Germany) and the Arvena Congress Hotel. Furthermore, the Bayreuther Osterfesival Society supports the festival.

To make the festival public the festival has local (Radio Mainwelle, Nordbayerischer Kurier, TMT Multimedia-Productions) and national (Bayerischer Rundfunk Studio Franken, Bayern 4 Klassik, Crescendo, Deutschlandradio Kultur, Müller Verlag) media partners.

Until now the charity concerts raised €200,000 which could be donated to the children’s hospital in Bayreuth.

== Selection of pieces played by the IJOA at the Bayreuther Osterfestival ==
- Mahler, Symphony No 1,4,5 and 8
- Mahler, Symphony No 2 (debut performance)
- Symphony, No 4
- Bruckner, Symphony No 7
- Tschaikowsky, Symphony 4, 5, and 6
- Dvořák, Symphony 8 and 9
- Mendelson, Violin Concerto
- Wagner, prelude and overture to Parsival, Lohengrin, Tannhäuser and Fliegender Holländer
- Grieg, Holbein Suite
- Vivaldi, Four Seasons
- Mozart, Violin Concert A major
- Bach, Brandenburgische Konzerte

== CD Recordings ==
12 Classic CDs and one popular CD (Jazz and Salonorchestra)

== Sources ==
Kultur- und Sozialstiftung Internationale Junge Orchesterakademie
