= Thomas Herbert Maguire =

English artist and engraver (1821–1895)

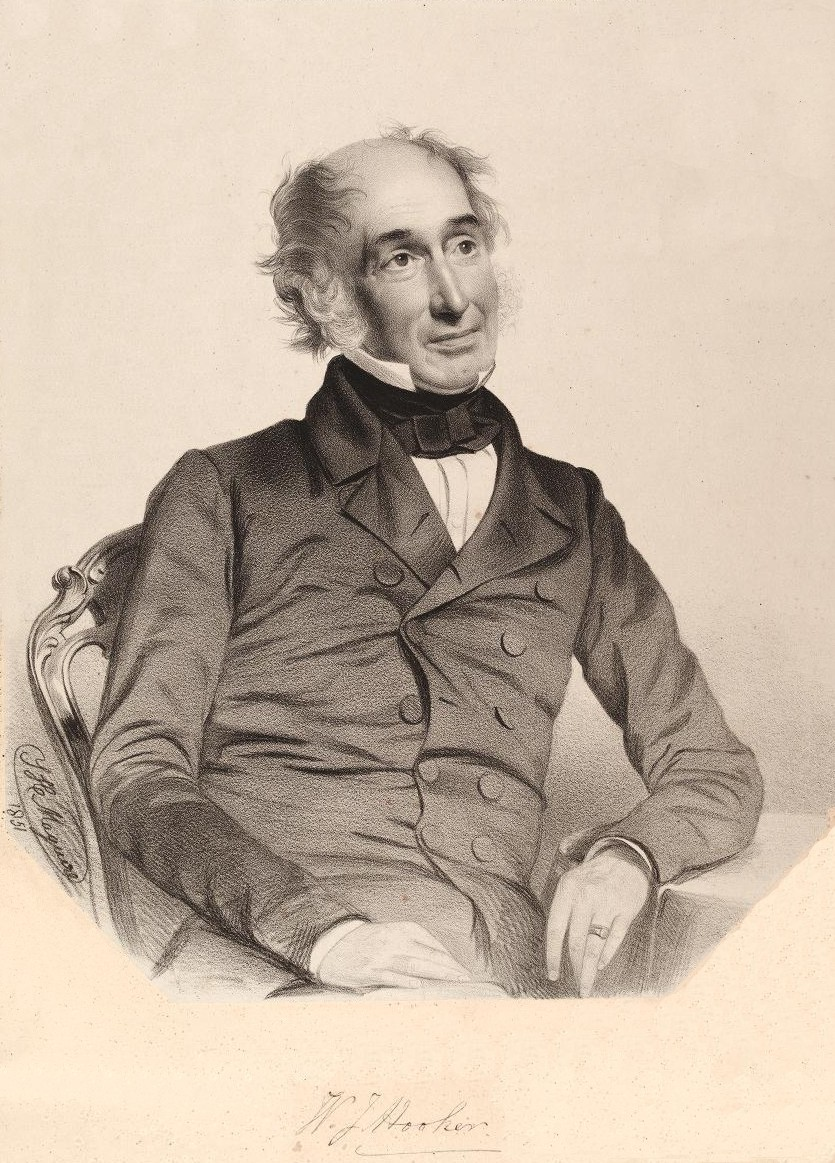
William Jackson Hooker by Thomas Herbert Maguire

Thomas Herbert Maguire (1821 – 1895) was an English artist and engraver, noted for his portraits of prominent figures.

== Career ==
Maguire was a brilliant pupil of Richard James Lane, one of the favourite collaborators of the Swiss portrait painter, Alfred Edward Chalon in the pages of the Illustrated London News.

The series of 60 scientific portraits by Maguire was privately commissioned by George Ransome, FLS, of Ipswich, in connection with the foundation of the Ipswich Museum. They were executed cumulatively between 1847 and 1852, as the Museum obtained fresh scientific sponsors. Some were made by the artist from life, and others from photographic portraits or (in the case of the Revd William Kirby) from an oil portrait. The exact total of this series is slightly above 60 because some (e.g. Edwin Lankester) were re-drawn. Copies of the lithographs were given to subscribing members of the Museum, and a bound portfolio copy of the series was presented by Professor J.S. Henslow to Prince Albert when he inspected the Museum on the occasion of the 1851 Ipswich Congress of the British Association for the Advancement of Science. George Ransome resigned his position as founding Secretary of the Museum in 1852 and the cumulative series was then discontinued. His drawing of William John Burchell dated 1854 was engraved by M. & N. Hanhart.
