= European Polymer Journal =

- Discipline: Macromolecular science
- Language: English
- Edited by: Richard Hoogenboom

Publication details
- History: 1965–present
- Publisher: Elsevier
- Frequency: Monthly
- Impact factor: 5.8 (2023)

Standard abbreviations
- ISO 4: Eur. Polym. J.

Indexing
- ISSN: 0014-3057

Links
- Journal homepage; online access

European Polymer Journal is a monthly peer-reviewed scientific journal, established in 1965 and published by Elsevier. The journal is publishing both original research and review papers on topic of the physics and chemistry of polymers. In 2006, it launched the polymer nanotechnology section. Richard Hoogenboom (Ghent University), is the editor-in-chief.
