= François-Germain Aliamet =

- The Circumcision of Christ, 1755–1765, engraving by François Germain Aliamet after Guido Reni, Rijksmuseum, Amsterdam
- Born: 5 May 1733; Paris, France
- Died: 5 February 1790 (aged 56); London, Great Britain
- Known for: Engraving
- Relatives: Jacques Aliamet (brother)

François-Germain Aliamet (5 May 1733 – 5 February 1790) was an 18th-century French engraver active in Britain.

== Biography ==
François-Germain Aliamet was born on 5 May 1733, in the parish of Sainte-Catherine in Abbeville to a well-to-do bourgeois family. He was the son of Antoine Aliamet – a merchant – and his wife Marie-Anne Dumont. His elder brother was the engraver Jacques Aliamet. It was probably the success of his brother that drew François-Germain to an artistic career. He first studied drawing with Garet, an artist active in Lille, then moved to Paris, where he continued his studies under his brother.

In 1756, at the age of 22, Aliamet went to seek his fortune in London, where he settled, opened a drawing school and married. As an engraver he worked under the direction of Robert Strange, who had himself been trained in France by Jacques-Philippe Le Bas. In London, he gained a reputation for his skill with the burin. Unlike his brother, he produced portraits of aristocrats, actors, and notable figures; he also fulfilled commissions to create engravings based on paintings by Old Masters – including works by Annibale Carracci and Charles Le Brun – drawn from private collections.

His primary London-based publishers were John Boydell and Thomas Major. For Boydell he executed several large historical and religious pieces, including the Adoration of the Shepherds after Annibale Carracci the Circumcision after Guido Reni, The Martyrdom of St. Stephen after Eustache Le Sueur, Canute Reproving his Courtiers and the Surrender of Calais to Edward III after Robert Edge Pine and A Sacrifice to Pan after Andrea Sacchi. Aliamet died in London on 5 February 1790, aged 56.

== Gallery ==
A sacrifice to Pan, engraved by Aliamet after Andrea Sacchi, 1769

Martyrdom of Saint Stephen, 1773, engraved by Aliamet after Eustache Le Sueur, Bibliothèque nationale de France, Paris

Hannah Pritchard in the role of Hermione in The Winter's Tale, 1765. Engraving by Aliamet after Robert Edge Pine, Rijksmuseum, Amsterdam

Portrait of the painter Noël Hallé, engraved by Aliamet after Vivant Denon, Bibliothèque nationale de France, Paris

== Bibliography ==
- Delignières, Émile (1896). Catalogue raisonné de l'œuvre gravé de Jacques Aliamet d'Abbeville précédé d'une notice sur sa vie et son œuvre (in French). Paris: Rapilly libraire-éditeur.
- Portalis, Roger; Beraldi, Henri (1896). Les graveurs du dix-huitième siècle (in French). Vol. 1. Paris: Damascène Morgand & Charles Fatout. p. 11.
- "Aliamet, François-Germain". Benezit Dictionary of Artists. Oxford: Oxford University Press. 2011. doi:10.1093/benz/9780199773787.article.B00002882.
- Tillier, Philippe (2022). Les graveurs d'Abbeville (in French). Abbeville: Société d'émulation d'Abbeville/F. Paillart.
