= John Chester Buttre =

American engraver (1821–1893)

J. C. Buttre
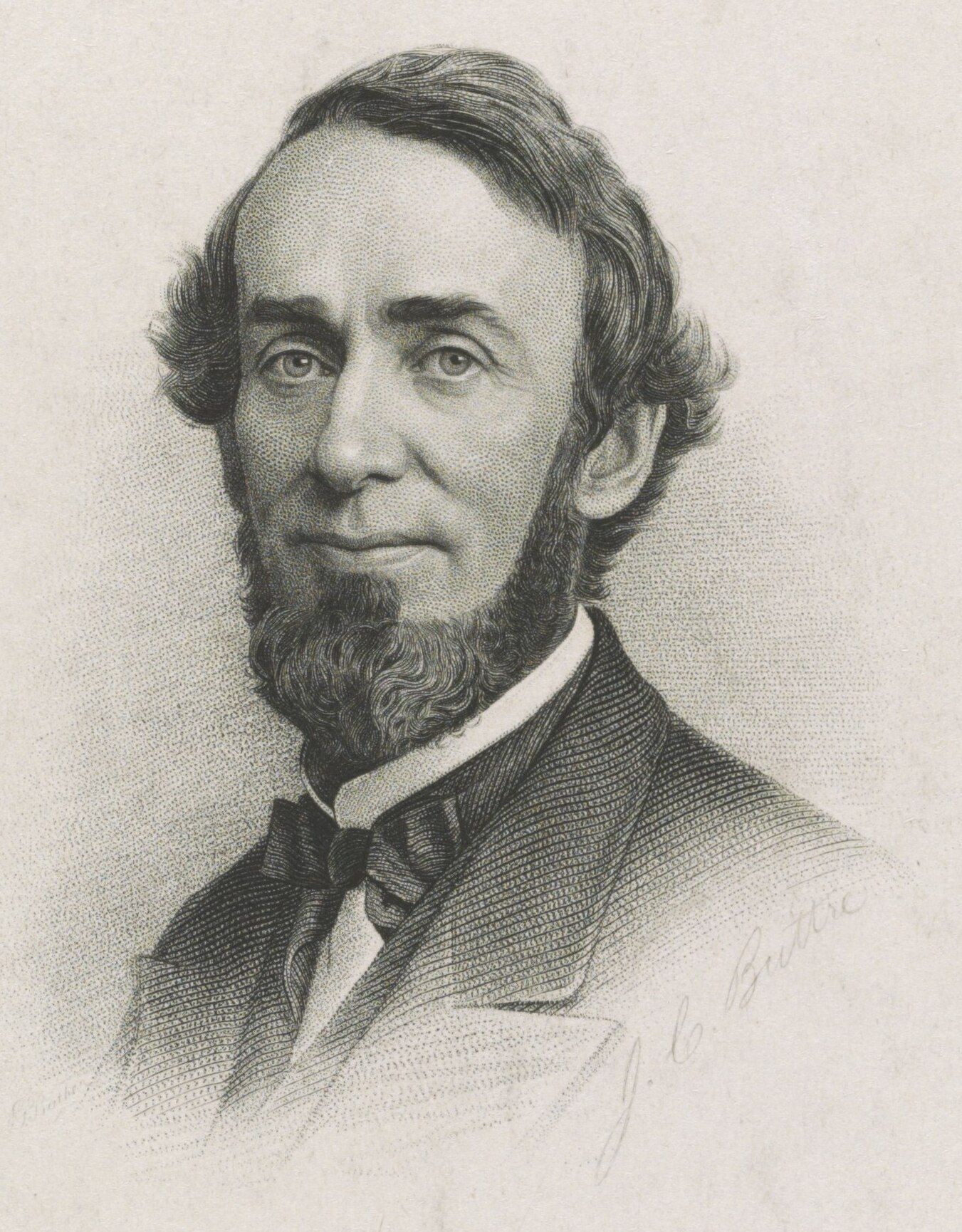
- Self-portrait
- Born: June 10, 1821; Auburn, New York, U.S
- Died: December 2, 1893 (aged 72); Ridgewood, New Jersey, U.S
- Occupation(s): Steel-plate engraver, lithographer
- Children: Lillian C. Buttre

John Chester Buttre (June 10, 1821 – December 2, 1893) was an American steel-plate engraver and lithographer, responsible for some 3,000 engraved portraits of American political, naval and military personalities. He published The American Portrait Gallery in three volumes (1880–81) with text by his daughter, Lillian C. Buttre.

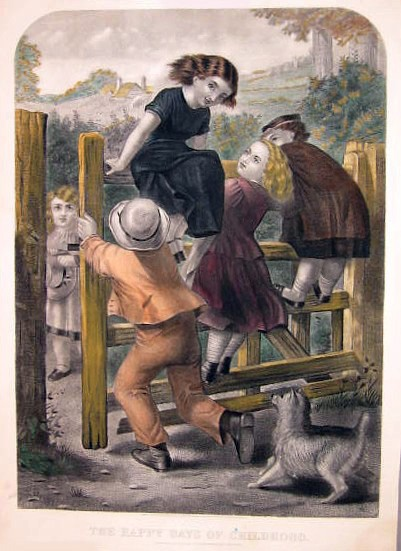
The Happy Days of Childhood (1871) by Buttre

== Biography ==
John Chester Buttre was born in Auburn, New York on June 10, 1821. He received his first drawing tuition from Hulaniski, a Polish exile living in Auburn. Later he applied himself to the study of portrait-painting. He was, however, better suited to drawing and wood-engraving. His work improving, he carried on the business of general engraver, producing card-plates, wood-cuts for newspapers and engraving silver-ware.

Arriving in New York in 1841, he devoted himself to steel-plate engraving, at which he soon became successful, his work appearing in many magazines and newspapers. He produced a widely acclaimed full-length portrait of President James Buchanan in 1858, together with a full-length portrait of Martha Washington. His Civil War work included sentimental images such as The Empty Sleeve, Only a Little Brook and Prayer in Camp, all of which sold well.

A resident of Ridgewood, New Jersey, Buttre died at his home there on December 2, 1893.
