= John Alefounder =

English painter

John Alefounder (1757 – 1794) was a painter of portraits and miniatures, working in London and later in India.

== Life ==
Alefounder was born in Colchester, Essex in 1757 and became a student at the Royal Academy Schools in 1776.

He exhibited at the Royal Academy between 1777 and 1793. The first piece he showed was a Design for a Lunatic Asylum, but after that he showed mostly portraits. He won a silver medal in 1782.

In 1784 he exhibited some theatrical portraits and portrait groups. Francesco Bartolozzi made an engraving after his portrait of "Peter the Wild Boy" and in the same year C.H. Hodges engraved his portrait of the actor John Edwin.

He subsequently went to India and died at Calcutta on 25 December 1794. According to William Baillie, in a letter written the following year, he committed suicide, in despair at his financial situation.

== Sources ==
- This article incorporates text from a publication now in the public domain: "Alefounder, John". Dictionary of National Biography. London: Smith, Elder & Co. 1885–1900.
