= Paolo Vincenzo Bonomini =

Italian painter

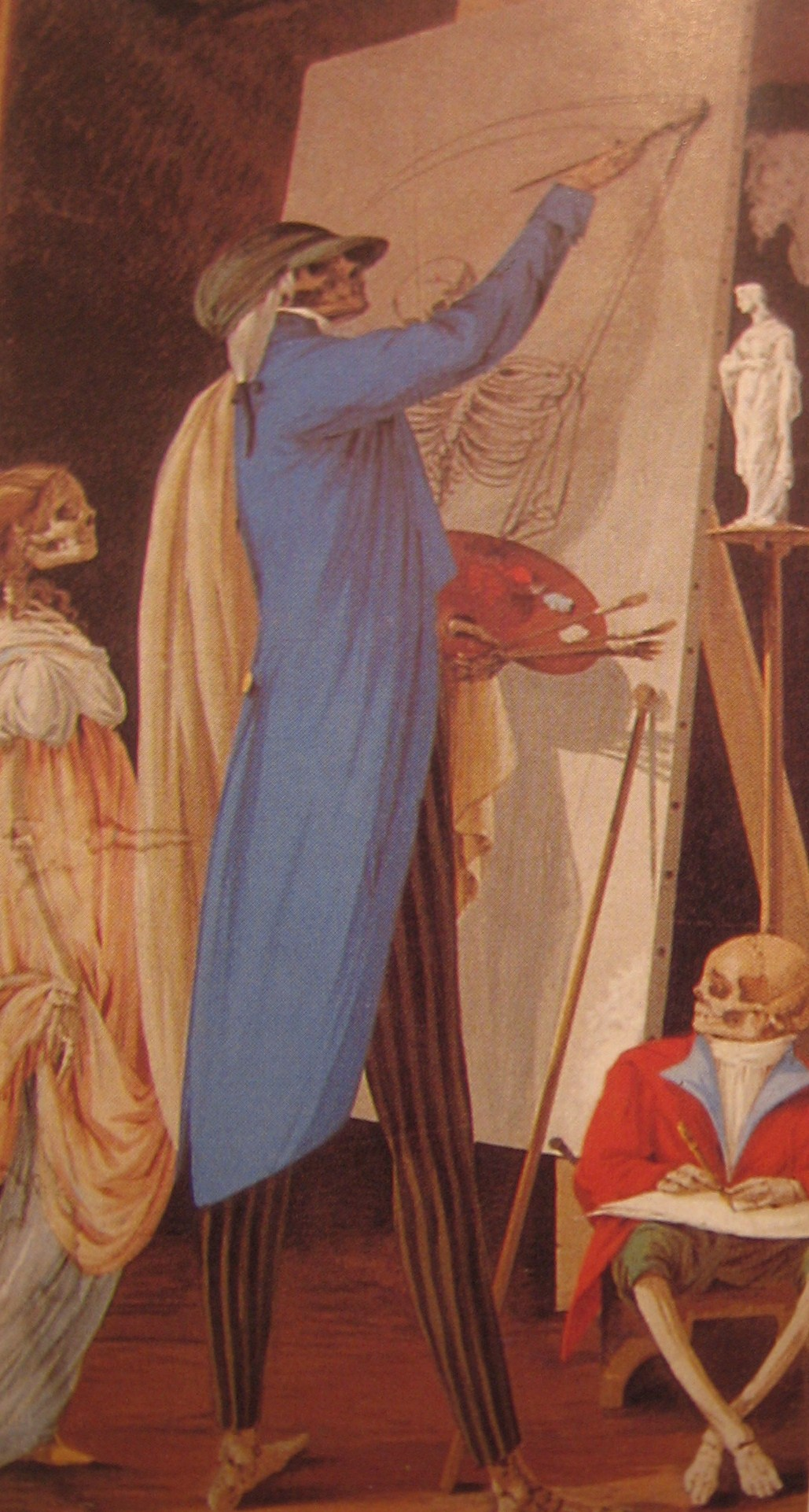
The Painter by Paolo Vincenzo Bonomini

Paolo Vincenzo Bonomini (23 January 1757 – 1839) was an Italian painter.

== Biography ==
Bonomini was born in Bergamo to an artist father Paolo Maria, who encouraged his son's artistic study. Bonomini's early works were done in a rococo style that later developed into neoclassical. He worked in many fields. He left as a decorator of civil and sacred, but reached the popularity for his portraits, and especially for his caricatures. From 1824 to 1827 he had the painter Giuseppe Macinata as a pupil.

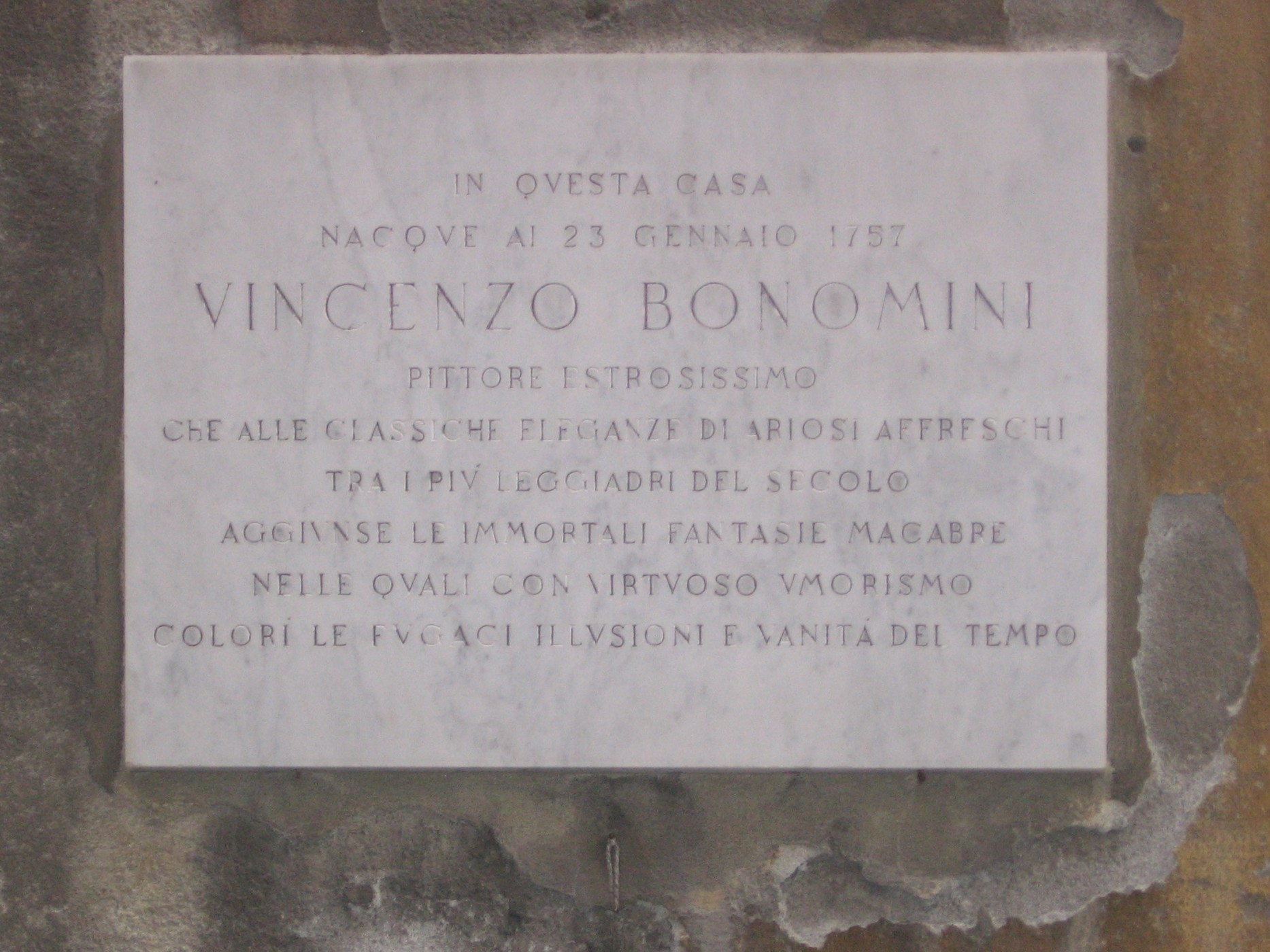
Plaque on the birthplace of Paolo Vincenzo Bonomini, Bergamo

== Works ==
One of his most noted works was scenes of the cycle of living skeletons that were commissioned by the Parish of Santa Grata Inter Vites Borgo Canale to remember the celebration of the Triduum of the dead. These paintings, after being exposed annually during the Triduum of the Dead in the parish of Borgo Canale, were exhibited at the Palazzo Pitti in Florence in 1922, with great success. Noteworthy are also some decorations of public and private buildings in the Bergamo area, as well as the collection of his drawings kept at the Civic Art Collections of the Sforza Castle in Milan.
