= Margravial Opera House =

Building in Bayreuth, Germany

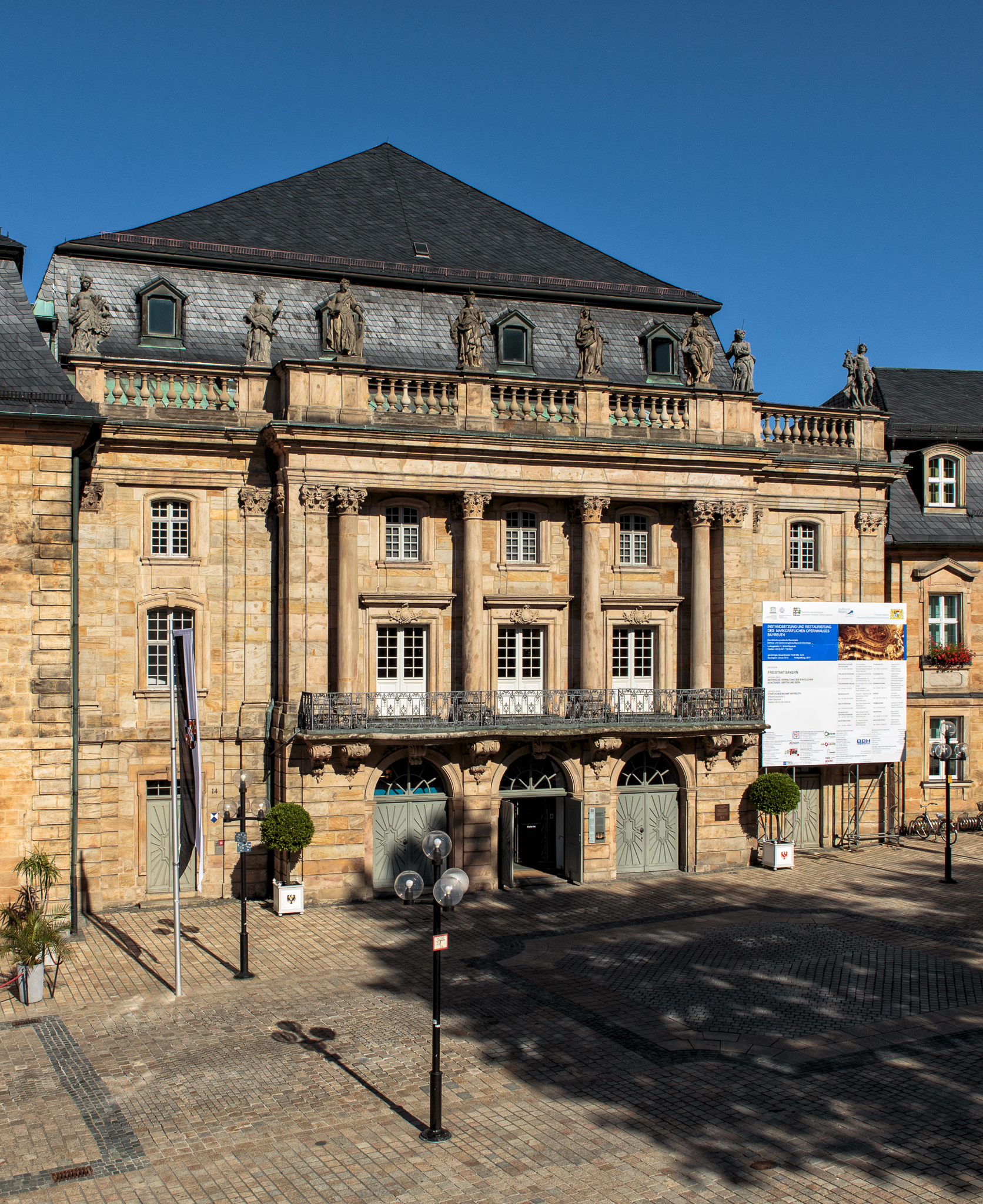
- The Margravial Opera House in 2013
- Interactive map of Margravial Opera House
- Location: Bayreuth, Bavaria, Germany
- Coordinates: 49°56′40″N 11°34′43″E
- Type: Opera house

Construction
- Built: 1744–1748
- Architects: Joseph Saint-Pierre; Giuseppe Galli Bibiena; Carlo Galli Bibiena

UNESCO World Heritage Site
- Official name: Margravial Opera House Bayreuth
- Criteria: Cultural: (i), (iv)
- Reference: 1379
- Inscription: 2012 (36th Session)
- Area: 0.19 ha (0.47 acres)
- Buffer zone: 4.22 ha (10.4 acres)

The Margravial Opera House (German: Markgräfliches Opernhaus) is a Baroque opera house in the town of Bayreuth, Germany. Built between 1745 and 1750, it is one of Europe's few surviving theatres of the period and has been extensively restored. On 30 June 2012, the opera house was added to the UNESCO World Heritage List because of its exceptional Baroque architecture.

== Description ==
Located in a widened part of the street so that carriages could pull up in front, the opera house is 71.5 meters long, 31 meters wide, and 26 meters tall. The building was constructed according to plans designed by the French architect Joseph Saint-Pierre (ca. 1709 – 1754), court builder of the Hohenzollern margrave Frederick of Brandenburg-Bayreuth and his wife Princess Wilhelmine of Prussia. The sandstone façade was designed to blend with the surrounding buildings and to reference the Place Vendôme in Paris, with large Corinthian columns. A balustrade stretches across the entire façade, with sculptures of Minerva, Apollo, and 6 Muses placed atop.

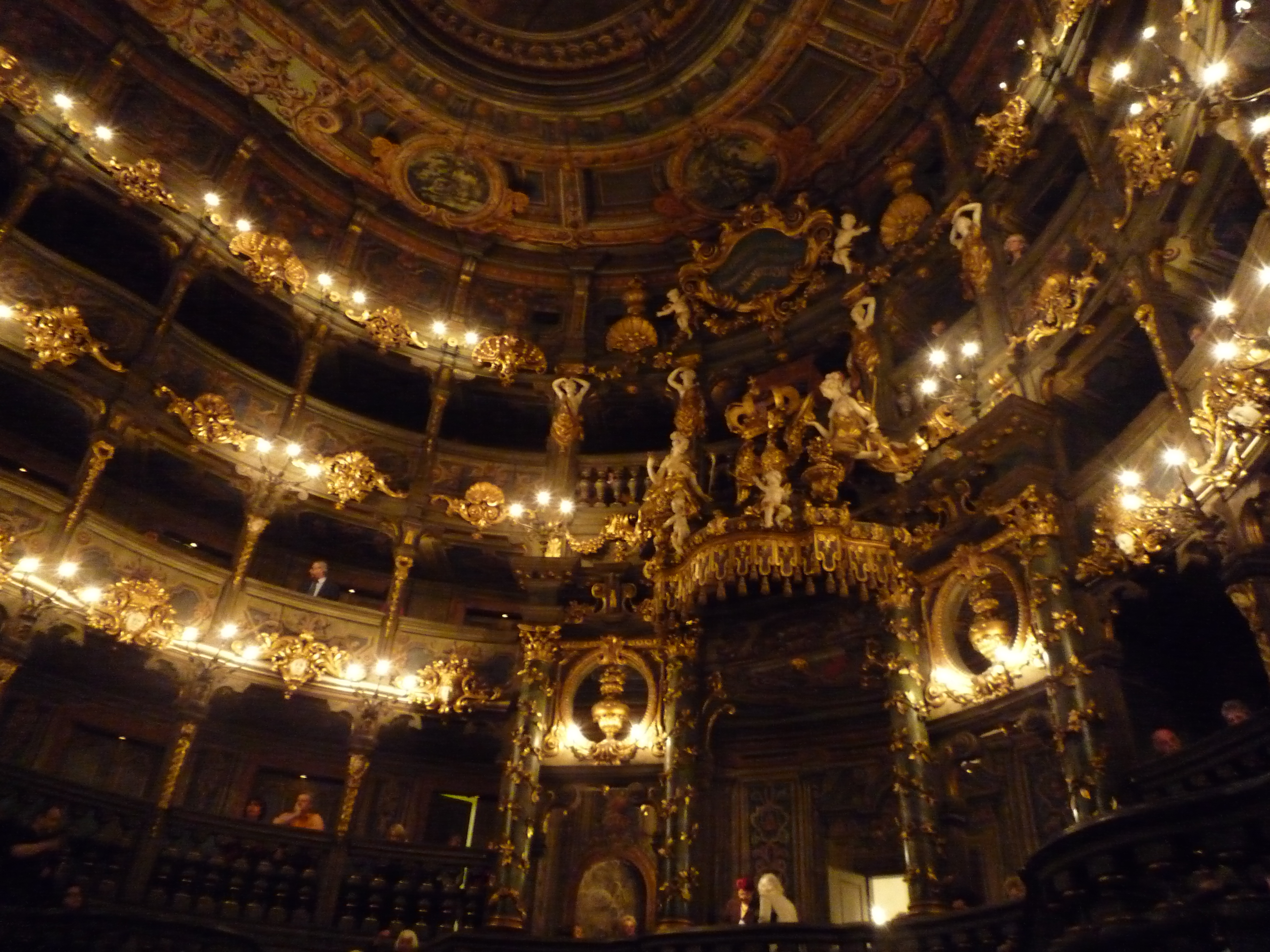
Interior, looking up at the Court Loge

The wooden interior was designed by Giuseppe Galli Bibiena (1696–1757) and his son Carlo from Bologna in an Italian Late Baroque style. The auditorium was built in a bell shape and can seat roughly 500 people. Intricately covered in gold accents, with a trompe-l'œil ceiling, the interior may have attempted to imitate precious stones like lapis lazuli. Some areas of the interior are covered with painted canvas in order to avoid cracks and improve acoustics.

The Court Loge built for the Margrave is located opposite the stage, taking up all three box stories. It is highly ornamented with symbols of the House of Brandenburg and is completely preserved in its original condition, except for the curtain which was taken by Napoleon's troops on their march to the 1812 Russian campaign. However, The Court Loge was seldom used by the art-minded margravial couple, who preferred a front-row seat.

== History ==
The Bayreuth Opera House was inaugurated on the occasion of the marriage of their daughter Elisabeth Fredericka Sophie with Duke Charles Eugene of Württemberg. Princess Wilhelmine, older sister of the Prussian king Frederick the Great, had established the margravial theatre company in 1737. In the new opera house she participated as a composer of opera works and Singspiele, as well as an actor and director. As of 2007 she featured in a sound-and-light presentation for tourists. After her death in 1758, performances ceased and the building went into disuse, one reason for its good conservation status.

More than one hundred years later, the stage's great depth of 27 metres (89 ft) attracted the composer Richard Wagner, who in 1872 chose Bayreuth as festival centre and had the Festspielhaus built north of the town. The foundation stone ceremony was held on 22 May, Wagner's birthday, and included a performance of Beethoven's Symphony No. 9, directed by Wagner.

Parts of the 1994 biopic Farinelli were filmed in the Opera House. The theatre was the site of the annual Bayreuther Osterfestival until 2009. Each September from the year 2000 to 2009, the theatre also hosted the Bayreuth Baroque festival, with performances of early operatic rarities. The 2009 festival included performances of Andrea Bernasconi's festa teatrale, L'Huomo, to a libretto by the Margravine Wilhelmine. Bayreuth Baroque was revived in 2020.

The theatre closed in October 2012 for extensive refurbishment and redevelopment and reopened on 12 April 2018.
