= Victor Bonavia =

Maltese cricketer, physician and British Army officer

Personal information
- Full name: Victor Joseph Bonavia
- Born: 2 September 1893; British Malta
- Died: 20 November 1948 (aged 55); Hamburg, British Occupied Germany
- Batting: Unknown
- Bowling: Unknown

Domestic team information
- Years: Team
- 1925/26–1928/29: Europeans

Career statistics
Competition	First-class
Matches	3
Runs scored	104
Batting average	20.80
100s/50s	–/–
Top score	40
Balls bowled	6
Wickets	0
Bowling average	–
5 wickets in innings	–
10 wickets in match	–
Best bowling	–
Catches/stumpings	–/–
- Source: Cricinfo, 7 November 2021

Victor Joseph Bonavia (2 September 1893 – 20 November 1948) was a Maltese first-class cricketer, physician and British Army officer.

Bonavia was born in British Malta in September 1893. He obtained his medical doctorate at the University of Malta, before obtaining his Membership of the Royal Colleges of Physicians in London. Bonavia served in the First World War and was commissioned as a temporary lieutenant in the Royal Army Medical Corps in February 1917, being assigned to Thessaloniki. He was promoted to lieutenant in full in February 1917, obtaining the temporary rank of captain at the same time, a rank he gained in full in August 1920. He served in Thessaloniki until 1921, before transferring to Netley Hospital in 1923, where he worked as a specialist registrar until 1924. From there he went to British India, where he played first-class cricket for the Europeans cricket team on two occasions against the Sikhs in 1926 and the Muslims in 1929. He also made a first-class appearance for the Punjab Governor's XI against Northern India. In his three first-class matches, Bonavia scored 104 runs with a highest score of 44. He was promoted to major in February 1929, with Bonavia remaining in India until 1930. After returning to England where he practiced at the Royal Herbert Hospital in Woolwich, he left for China in 1932, remaining there until 1936. He later served in the Second World War, during which he was promoted to lieutenant colonel in October 1943, with his promotion to colonel following after the end of the war in November 1947. He was appointed to the BMH Hamburg in the British occupation-zone in Germany in 1947, where he died suddenly in November 1948.
