= William Verstille =

American painter

William Verstille (c. 1757 – 1803) was an American artist who worked in Boston, Philadelphia and New York. He specialized in portraits. Examples of his artwork reside in the collections of the Harvard Art Museum, Massachusetts Historical Society, Metropolitan Museum of Art, Museum of Fine Arts Boston, New York Historical Society, Philadelphia Museum of Art, Smithsonian, and Yale University.

== Images ==
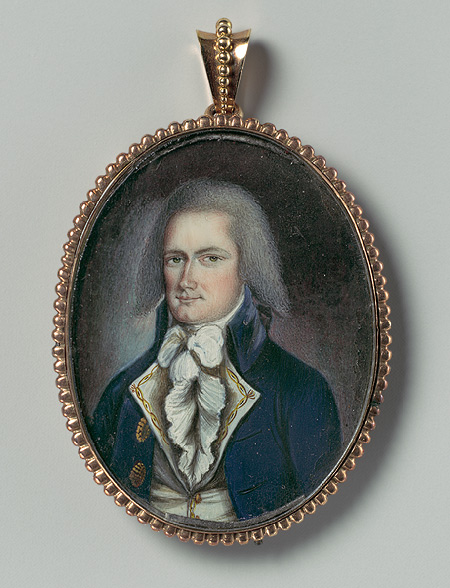
G.H. Remsen by Verstille (Metropolitan Museum of Art)

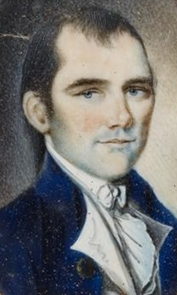
Unidentified man by Verstille

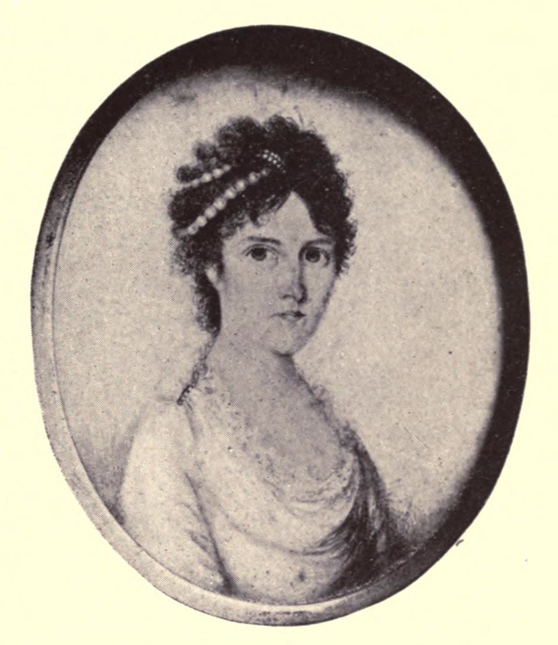
S.H. Ward by Verstille

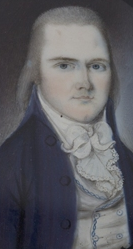
Unidentified man by Verstille

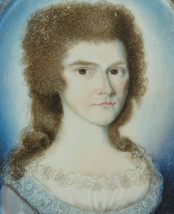
Mrs. Moses B. Russell by Verstille
