= María Luisa Carranque y Bonavía =

Spanish artist

Maria Luisa Carranque y Bonavía was a Spanish noblewoman and pastellist.

Carranque y Bonavía was the daughter of Antonio Carranque Mondragón y Vela and doña Isabel María Bonavía Grana García de Diana; her father was the third marquis of Yebra. Only one daughter, born to the couple in 1753, is recorded, under the names Isabel María; it is unknown whether or not this is the same individual as the artist. In 1773 she was unanimously named an honorary member of the Real Academia de Bellas Artes de San Fernando after submitting for consideration a pastel of the Virgin and Child which has been described as reminiscent of the work of Alonso Cano and Francisco de Zurbarán.
