= Giovanni Battista Brostoloni =

Italian engraver

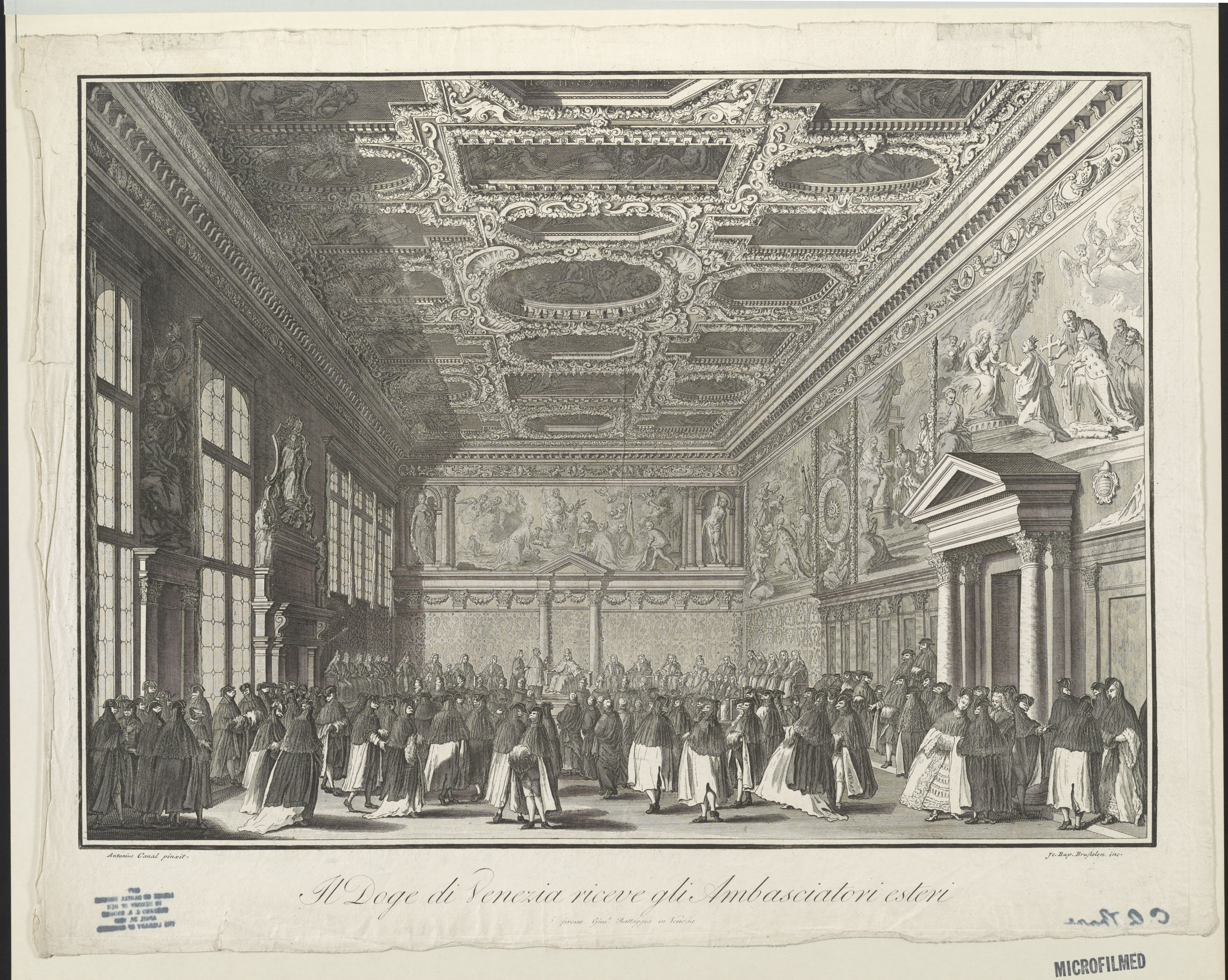

Giovanni Battista Brostoloni (born c. 1726) was an Italian engraver, born in Venice. He was a pupil of Joseph Wagner. He engraved two Portraits of Pope Benedict XIV and a St. Theresa in Adoration. He also produced twenty vedute of Venice (1763) and twelve large plates of Ceremonies of the Election of Doge and his Marriage with Adriatic –all after Canaletto.
