= Françoise Duparc =

Canadian artist

- Born: 15 October 1726; Murcia
- Died: 2 October 1778 (aged 51)
- Known for: painter
- Movement: Baroque

Françoise Duparc (15 October 1726 – 2 October 1778) was a Spanish-born Baroque painter who later lived in France.

== Life ==
Françoise Duparc was born in Murcia, where her father Antoine Duparc, a French sculptor from Marseille, had settled and married a local Spanish woman. The family returned to Marseille in 1730, and Françoise was introduced to painting by her father and served her apprenticeship in the studio of Jean-Baptiste van Loo in Aix-en-Provence from 1742 to 1745.

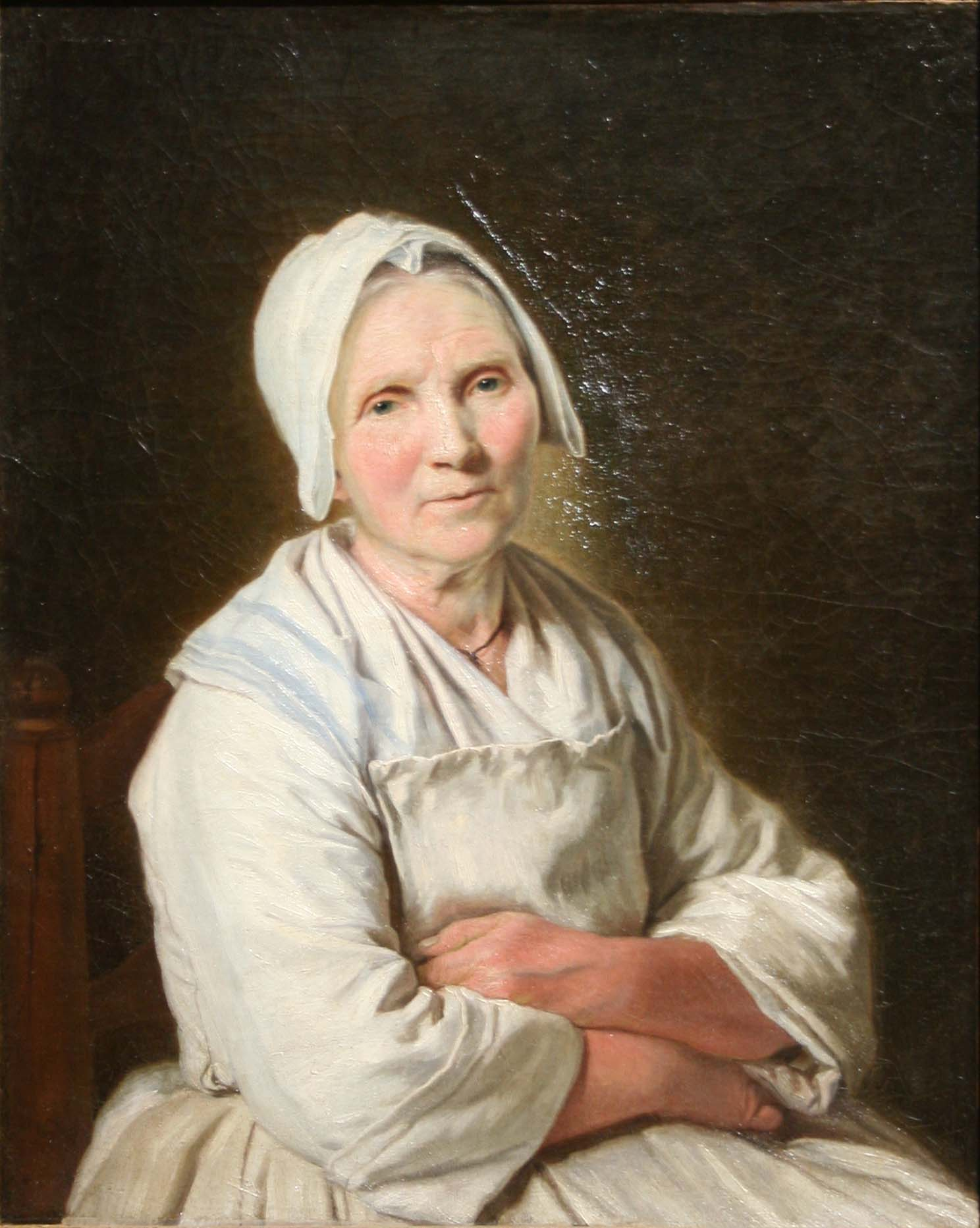
Old woman Sitting by Françoise Duparc, Musée des beaux-arts de Marseille

It is quite difficult to follow Duparc's course as she worked in different European cities: Paris and London, where she participated in two exhibitions in 1763 and 1766, and Wrocław where she spent time with one of her sisters, Claire.

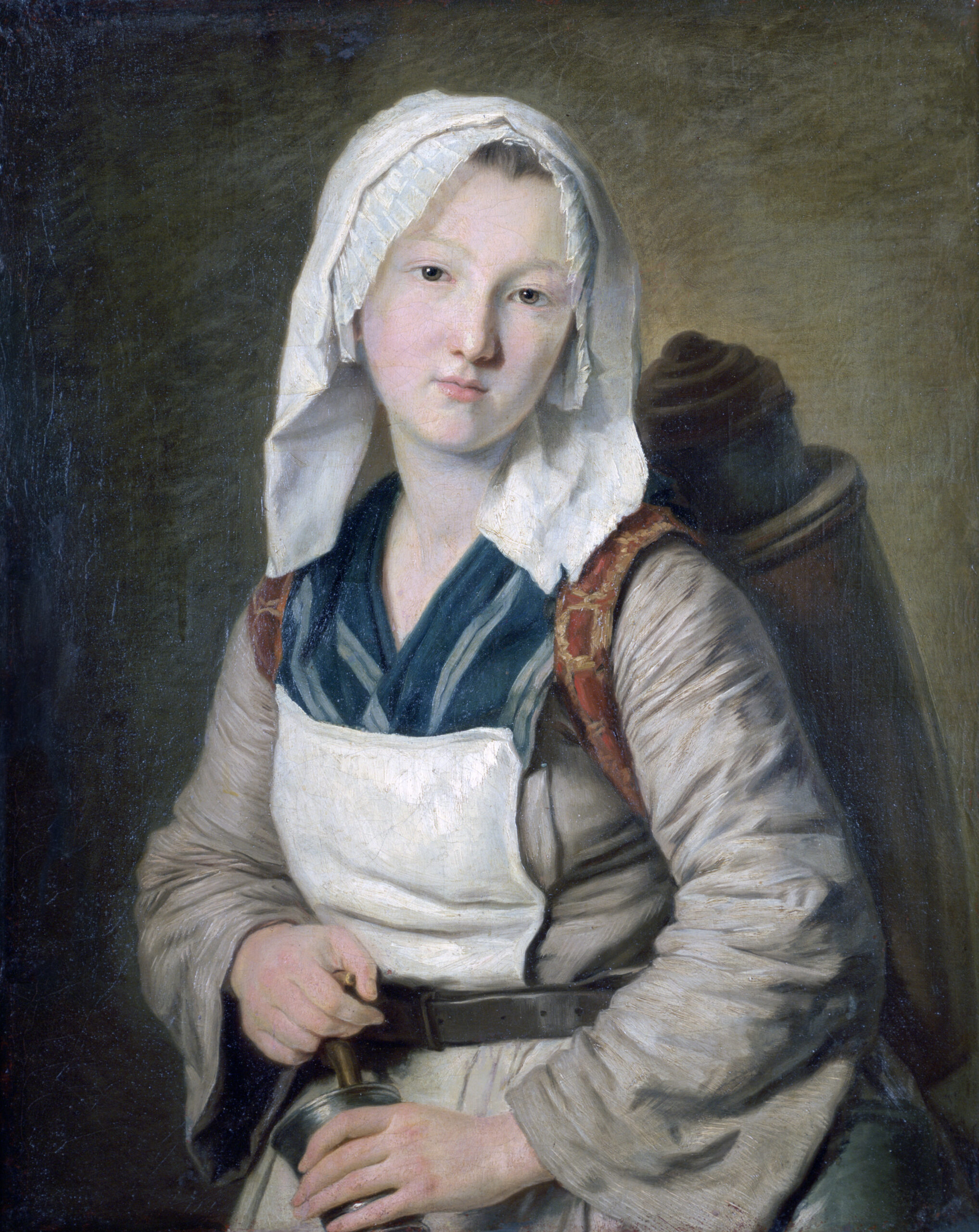
Duparc's painting entitled la marchande de tisane (herbal tea seller), Musée des beaux-arts de Marseille

She returned to Marseille in 1771 where she joined the Academy of Painting and Sculpture in 1776. She died on 2 October 1778. Her estate inventory reported forty-one paintings that have not been found with the exception of the four paintings bequeathed by the artist to the city of Marseille, which are currently in the Musée des beaux-arts de Marseille. These paintings, whose style recalls the humble realism of the Le Nain brothers are: Woman with Book, Tea Merchant, Old Woman and Man.

Duparc's works are marked for their simplicity. She usually depicted scenes in all their sincerity, stripping any embellishments. She mostly painted scenes of daily life, common people on the streets and in their homes. Her work bore the influence of the Dutch style.

Françoise Duparc was a member of the Academy of Painting and Sculpture of Marseille and the city gave her name to a street: Rue Francoise Duparc.
