= Michel-Bruno Bellengé =

French painter

Michel-Bruno Bellengé (1726 – 13 December 1793) was a French painter.

Bellengé was one of the first students of the Rouen School founded by Jean-Baptiste Descamps. He won three awards there between 1748 and 1751.

He specialized in painting flowers on enamel, as well as vegetables and fruits. He worked to paint the ceiling of the La Celle-Saint-Cloud under the direction of Jean-Baptiste Marie Pierre. He also worked with Jean-Baptiste-Henri Deshays. Approved in 1762, he was received in 1764 to the Rouen Academy of Arts on the recommendation of Jean-Baptiste-Siméon Chardin who believed in him.

Appointed director of the Turkey carpet factory in Trocadéro, he made the drawings in which the tapestries were executed for the choir of Notre Dame. It is currently housed in The Louvre.

Ruined by the French Revolution, Bellengé finished widowed and paralyzed for the rest of his life. He died on 13 December 1793 in Rouen.

== Bibliography ==
- Hermann Edition, p. 241
- Théodore-Éloi Lebreton, Biography rouennaise, Rouen, Le Brument, 1865, p. 25.
