= Giuseppe Galli Bibiena =

Italian designer (1969–1757)

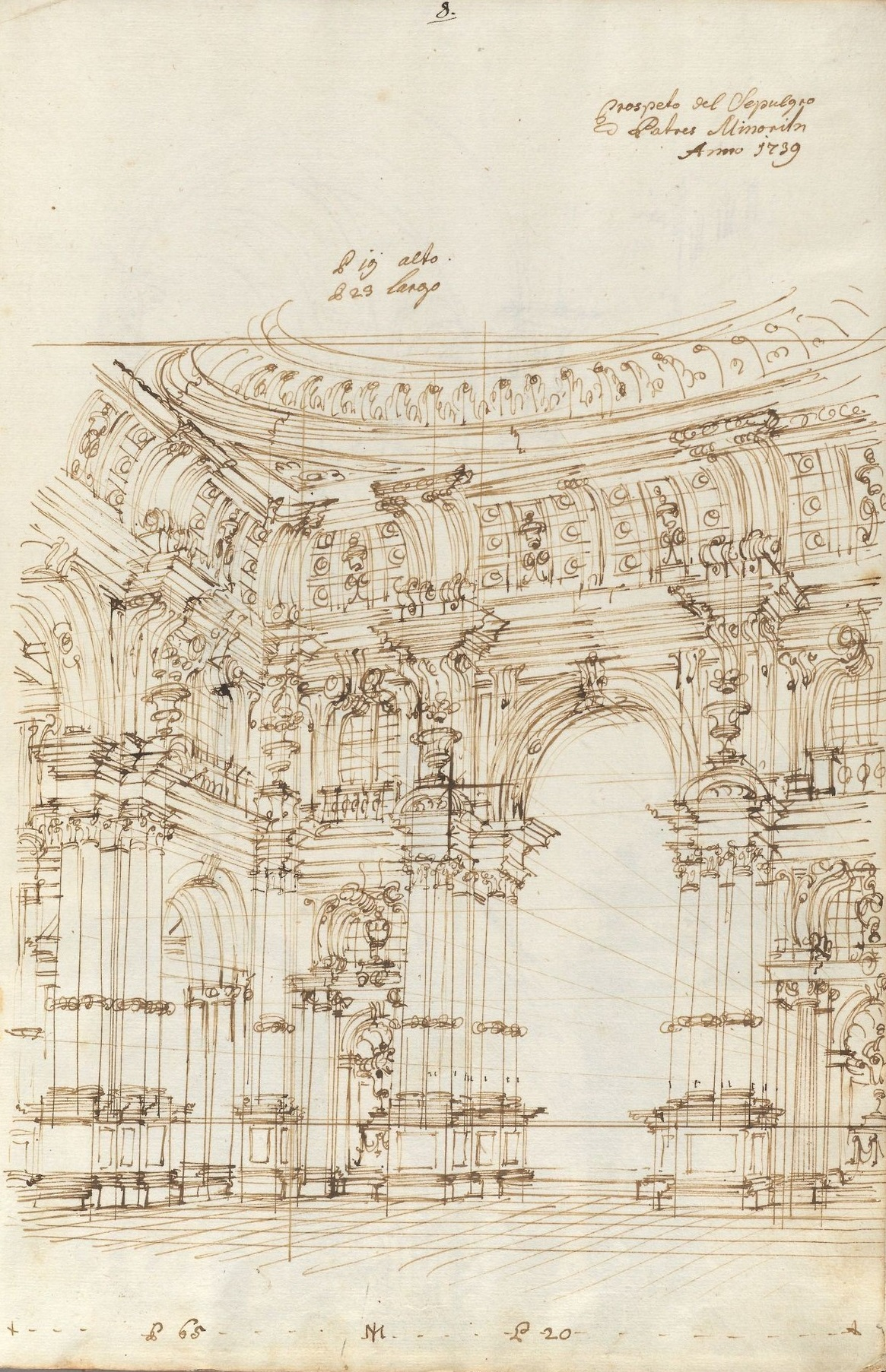
Sketch by Giuseppe Galli Bibiena, 1735–1745

Giuseppe Galli Bibiena (5 January 1696 - 12 March 1757), Italian designer, became the most distinguished artist of the Galli da Bibiena family.

== Life ==
He was born in Parma, Duchy of Parma and Piacenza, the second son of Ferdinando Galli Bibiena. In 1708, Ferdinando was called to Barcelona by Charles III of Habsburg to help organize and decorate his wedding to Elisabeth Christine of Brunswick-Wolfenbüttel, Queen of Prussia, and Giuseppe accompanied him. Later, Giuseppe travelled with his father to the courts of Charles VI, the Holy Roman Emperor (reigned 1711-1740), who hired Fernando to be the court's scenographer and painter. There, when his father left in 1717, he became the chief organizer of the court festivities and official functions and was named "His Majesty's Second Theatrical Engineer". It was not until 1723 that Giuseppe was officially promoted to "His Majesty's First Theatrical Engineer" and kept the position until 1747. After receiving his position in court, Giuseppe became involved in decorating all the Habsburgs' celebratory festivities. He did parties, weddings, funerals, and painted in monasteries and various countries. He also did work for religious venues, such as Melk Abbey (Pulpit and High Altar) and in Prague, where he built a decorative arch in 1729 for the celebration of John of Nepomuk. His younger brother, Antonio Galli Bibiena, was also hired by the Vienna court and worked alongside Giuseppe. Together, Antonio and Giuseppe designed theatre decorations and for festivities in Vienna, also Linz, Graz, and Prague (1723 "Costanza e Fortezza" at Hradčany castle).

The death of Charles VI in 1740 made a significant shift in Giuseppe Bibiena's career. Charles VI's daughter and successor Maria Theresa did not see the theatre as representative of her reign as her father did. Especially after her marriage to Francis I, his French tastes overturned Italian prominence in the Vienna court. Giuseppe stayed in Vienna, organized Maria Theresa's wedding and festivities and still continued to find various jobs in the area, but his significance in the Vienna court diminished. This caused Giuseppe to take various jobs outside Vienna. In 1753, Giuseppe was hired by Frederick the Great of Prussia in his court in Berlin. There Giuseppe spent the last three years of his life and died at the age of 61 on 12 March 1757.

== Works ==
- in 1722, Giuseppe Galli Bibiena worked in Munich
- in 1723, he designed religious venues in Prague
- in 1735, he designed the Pulpit and High Altar for The Abbey Church, Melk Abbey
- in 1742, he designed the decorations for the Vienna state opera
- in 1744, he designed the interior of the Margrave's Opera House at Bayreuth
- in 1747, Giuseppe was employed at the opera in Dresden, Saxony
- in 1750, he renovated the Dresden opera (which burned in 1849)
- in 1751, Giuseppe received occasional orders from Friedrich the Great
- in 1753, worked permanently for Friedrich the Great in Berlin.

== Style ==
Giuseppe's innovation in theatre and in architecture embodied the Baroque/Classical style of the time period. His designs focused on detail, majesty, grandeur, and demonstrated a classical theme which was considered “true art” in the society of that time. Because of this, Giuseppe thrived as an artist. Although most of Giuseppe's designs were made to be temporary and are no longer accessible, many of his drawings were published. His efforts to combine architecture and painting through the perspective can easily be seen in three series of engravings: Alcina (in 1716), Costanza e Fortezza (1723 "Constancy and Fortitude"); and Architetture e prospettive (1740 "Architecture and Perspective"). The baroque style and attention to detail made the Bibiena style of scenography stand out. The multifaceted backdrops gave the audience a more realistic experience and added to the overall aesthetic of the play or opera. They not only impacted the scenery designs inside the theatre but also the architecture of the theatre itself.

== Collections ==
Giuseppe's drawings are held in the permanent collections of several institutions, including the Nelson-Atkins Museum of Art, the Smart Museum of Art, the Metropolitan Museum of Art, the University of Michigan Museum of Art, the Victoria and Albert Museum, the Museo Nacional del Prado, the Detroit Institute of Arts, the La Salle University Art Museum, and the Cooper Hewitt.
