= Vicente Escobar =

Cuban painter

Vicente Escobar y Flores
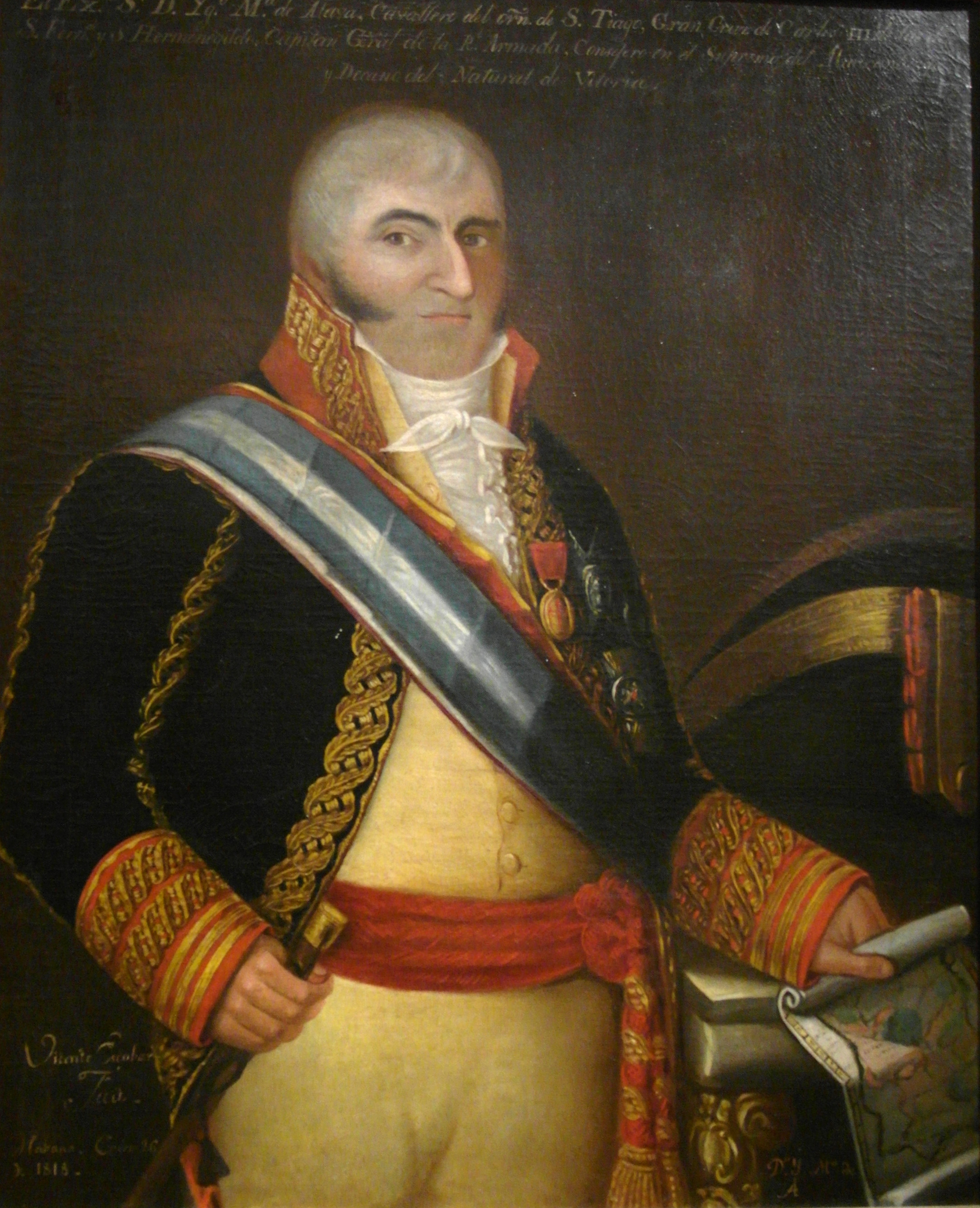
- Born: 1757; Havana, Cuba
- Died: 1834 (aged 76–77); Havana, Cuba
- Education: Real Academia de Bellas Artes de San Fernando
- Known for: Portrait painting
- Movement: Neoclassicism
- Patrons: Ferdinand VII of Spain

Vicente Escobar y Flores (1757–1834) was a Cuban painter.

== Biography ==
Son of Antonio Escobar and Justa María de Flores, he was born into a family of officers of the Pardos y Morenos Regiment. Though registered as black at birth, he took advantage of the "Real Cédula de Gracias al Sacar", a Royal Decree of Graces that allowed certain privileges to those who paid for it, and reportedly died as a legally recognized white man. A native of Havana, he reportedly learned to paint without any teachers, using as models the images of saints inherited from his maternal great-grandmother, though he later graduated from the Real Academia de Bellas Artes de San Fernando in Madrid in 1784, where he was a pupil of Mariano Salvador Maella and became acquainted with the works of Goya. He then undertook a voyage through Spain, Italy, and France. Around 1798, he married Doña Josefa de Estrada y Pimienta, a native of Bejucal, Cuba. In 1827, he was appointed Pintor de Cámara (Court Painter) by Ferdinand VII. He was the first painter to have a workshop in Cuba; among his pupils there was Juan del Río. Escobar primarily painted portraits for the duration of his career. He was undoubtedly the most sought-after portraitist of the time, the most distinctive of all. Renowned in his time, he died of a cholera epidemic in Havana in 1834 without leaving any descendants.
