= Carlo Bonavia =

Italian painter

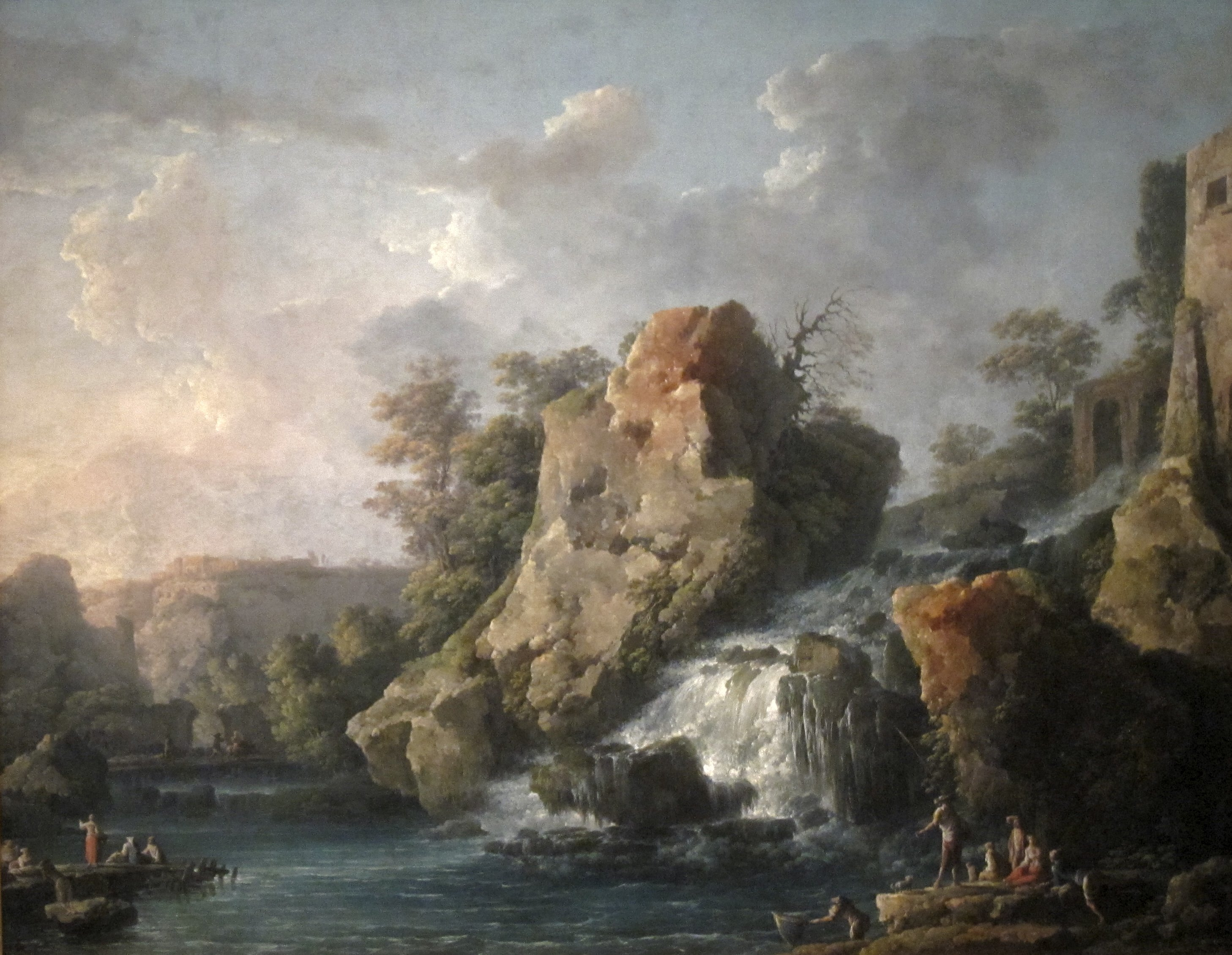
Carlo Bonavia's oil painting Teverone Cascade, 1787, Honolulu Museum of Art

Carlo Bonavia (died 1788) was an Italian painter known for idyllic landscape paintings, engravings and drawings. He was active from 1740 until his death. He is thought to be from Rome, but worked in Naples from about 1751 to 1788. He was trained in the Neapolitan landscape tradition of Salvator Rosa (1615–1673) and Leonardo Coccorante (1680–1750), but was much more strongly influenced by the work of Claude Joseph Vernet, who visited Naples in 1737 and 1746.

Bonavia's paintings share with Vernet's a rococo palette of pale blues, creamy yellows, pinks and soft green, as well as an atmospheric, rather than analytical, approach to landscape. Like Vernet, Bonavia painted capricci in which real features of the Neapolitan countryside were placed in imaginary settings. Bonavia's idyllic landscapes were popular souvenirs of the Grand Tour. Among his patrons were Lord Brudenell and Count Karl Joseph Firmian, the Austrian ambassador to Naples 1753–8. Bonavia had a very successful career and was praised by Pietro Zani in his Enciclopedia Metodica Critico Ragionata delle Belle Arte (1794) as a fine painter of views and history subjects.

The Accademia di San Luca (Rome), the Dulwich Picture Gallery, the Fine Arts Museums of San Francisco, the Honolulu Museum of Art, the Metropolitan Museum of Art, the Museo di Capodimonte (Naples) and Stourhead (Wiltshire, England), Basildon Park (National Trust, Berkshire, England) are among the public collections having paintings by Carlo Bonavia.

== Gallery ==
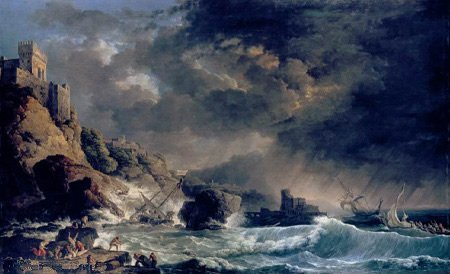
“Storm off Rocky Coast”, 1757

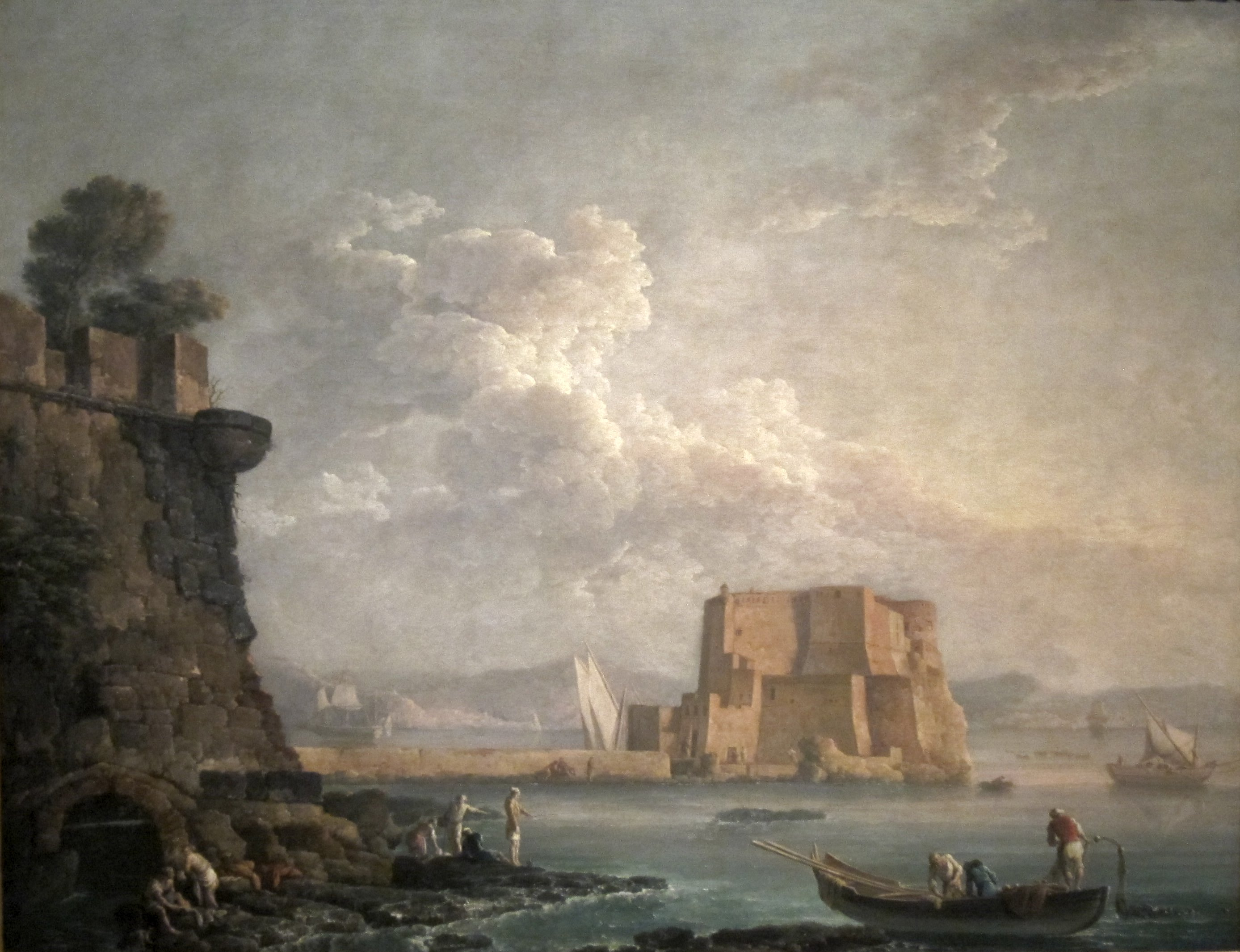
Carlo Bonavia's oil painting Castel dell'Ovo, Naples, 1788, Honolulu Museum of Art

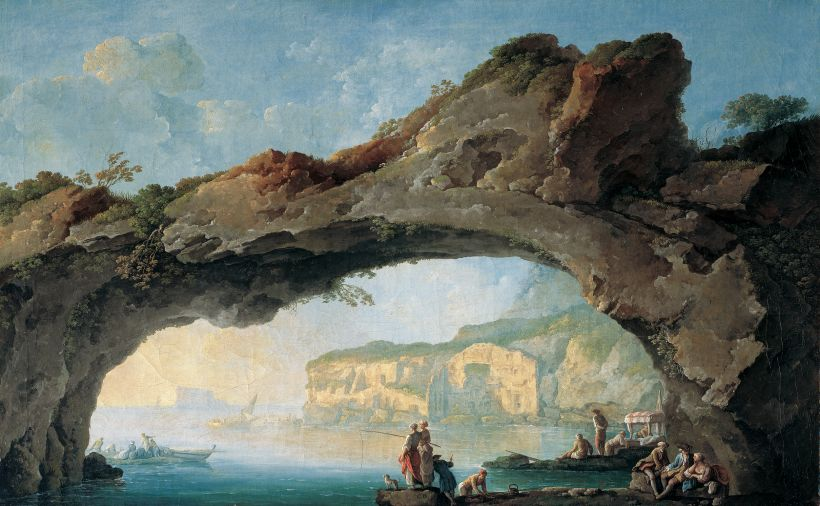
Painting by Carlo Bonavia
