= Odvardt Helmoldt von Lode =

Danish painter and engraver

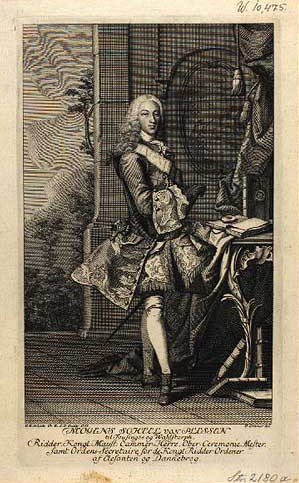
Mogens Scheel von Plessen (1713-1749), Danish nobleman, landowner, and courtier by Odvardt Helmoldt von Lode, 1751

Odvardt Helmoldt von Lode, also Odvardt Helmoldt de Lode (c. 1726 – 3 September 1757), was a Danish painter and engraver.

== Early life ==
Lode was the son of the painter and engraver Gustav de Lode. He followed in his father's footsteps and became a painter in Viborg and later in Copenhagen and was first mentioned in documents in 1742. From 1743 on there were articles about him and his work in several magazines.

== Works ==
In 1745 he painted the frontispiece in Altona, Hamburg. He also engraved a series of portraits of notable people, including Tycho Brahe, Adam Gottlob Moltke, Ole Worm, Peter Tordenskjold, Ludvig Holberg (1752) and Johan Ludvig Holstein-Ledreborg (1757).

== Later life ==
In 1754 he married a wine merchant's daughter, Karen Nordrup. In 1755 he was awarded the Academy's silver medal. He was then commissioned to engrave the twelve Oldenburg kings. He completed Christian I of Denmark in 1757, but died the same year. His widow died in 1763.
