= Jacques Aliamet =

French engraver

- Born: 30 November 1726; Abbeville, France
- Died: 29 May 1788 (aged 61); Paris
- Occupation: Engraver
- Relatives: François-Germain Aliamet (brother)

Jacques Aliamet (30 November 1726 in Abbeville – 29 May 1788 in Paris) was a French engraver. His brother François-Germain Aliamet was also an engraver. He perfected drypoint and his several surviving works include engravings after Nicolaes Berchem, Philips Wouwerman and Claude Joseph Vernet.

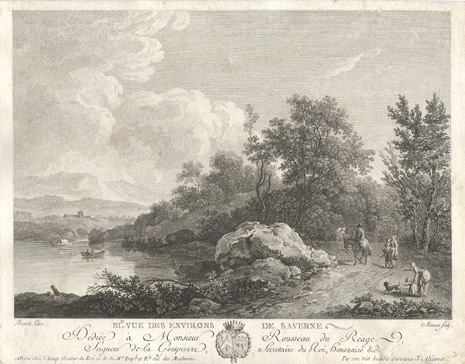
"View of the neighbourhood of Saverne", by Aliamet c. 1760
