= François-Gaspard Teuné =

Parisian ébéniste

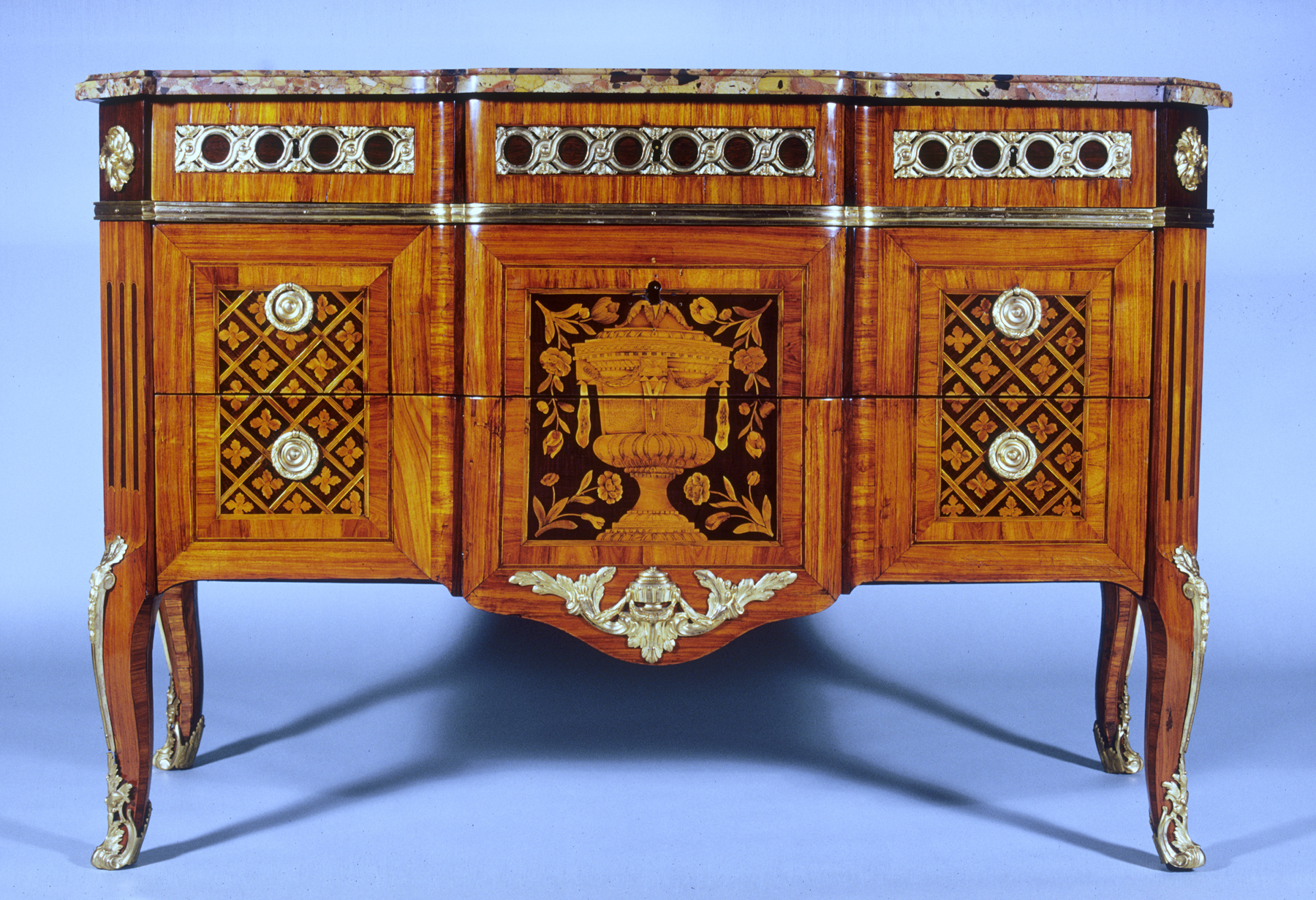
Marquetry commode, mid-1770s, stamped F G Teuné (Walters Art Museum)

François-Gaspard Teuné (1726 - after c 1788) was a Parisian ébéniste who was made master 19 March 1766. His stamped works are in the Neoclassical style, sometimes, as in the marquetry commode at the Walters Art Museum (illustration) reflecting vestiges of the Rococo in stiffened cabriole legs and the softened transitions between planes. He was one of a number of Parisian furniture makers of German families. He had premises in rue Traversière-Saint-Antoine and then in rue de Charonne. He disappears from the documents at the start of the Revolution.

A cylinder desk bearing in the marquetry the arms of the comte d'Artois, and made in 1781–82, is in the Royal Collection, Windsor Castle.

A chaise en gondole from Fontainebleau, one of a suite delivered in 1811, bears an inked label "Teuné", doubtless a member of his family.
