= Ulrich S. Schubert =

German chemist

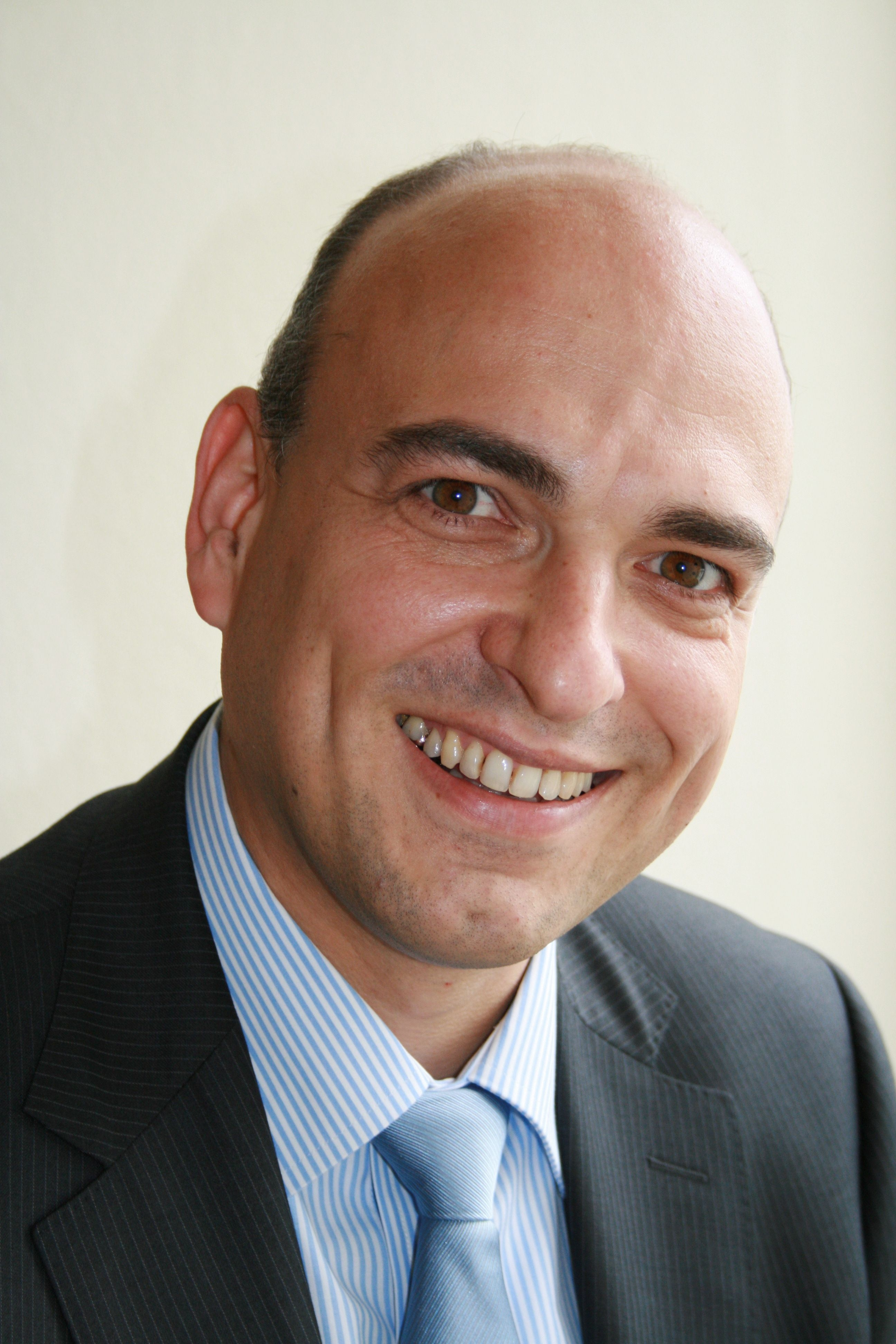
Ulrich Schubert in 2007

Ulrich Sigmar Schubert (born 17 July 1969, Tübingen) is a German chemist and full professor for Organic and Macromolecular Chemistry at the Friedrich-Schiller-University of Jena.

== Academic and professional background ==
Ulrich S. Schubert studied chemistry at the Goethe University Frankfurt and the University of Bayreuth, with a stay abroad in Richmond, Virginia, US. He received his doctorate in Bayreuth including a research stay in Tampa, Florida (supervisors C. D. Eisenbach and George R. Newkome), and had a post-doc stay in Strasbourg with Jean-Marie Lehn (Nobel Laureate for Chemistry 1987). He did his habilitation at the Technical University of Munich (mentor O. Nuyken). His research focuses on macro- and supramolecular chemistry, which produces new materials with potential applications in life sciences such as medicine and nanotechnology as well as energy renewal and energy storage.

Already during his habilitation in 1999, Schubert took up an associate professorship (C3) at LMU Munich at the Center for NanoScience. The following year he received a Heisenberg scholarship from the German Research Foundation (Deutsche Forschungsgemeinschaft, DFG) and worked at the Technical University of Munich. From 2000 to 2007, Schubert held the professorship for Macromolecular Chemistry and Nanosciences at the Eindoven University of Technology (TU/e). From 2003 to 2014 he was Scientific Chairman of the HTE division at the Dutch Polymer Institute (Dutch Polymer Institute) and from 2005 on member of the board of directors of the "Cooperate Research" division. From 2007 to 2010, Schubert took over a part-time professorship for Macromolecular Chemistry and Nanoscience at Eindhoven University of Technology, as he also took up a W3 professorship for Organic and Macromolecular Chemistry at Friedrich Schiller University Jena from this time on.

In addition to his professorship since 2007, he has held various positions at the Friedrich Schiller University Jena, including as director of the Laboratory of Organic and Macromolecular Chemistry (IOMC; 2007–2013, and 2019–2022), spokesperson of the research focus "Innovative Materials and Technologies" (2008-2014), vice dean and dean of the Faculty for Chemistry and Earth Sciences (2010-2017), vice-spokesperson of the research profile line "Light" (2014-2019), member of the senate of FSU Jena (since 2019), member of the mediation committee as representative of the university teachers in the senate and chairman of twelve appointment committees.

In addition, Schubert is (founding) director of the Jena Center for Soft Matter (JCSM, since 2010) and the Center for Energy and Environmental Chemistry Jena (CEEC Jena, since 2014) at the Friedrich Schiller University Jena, where he is also a member of the planning team for the new buildings CEEC Jena II and AWZ CEEC Jena. Schubert initiated five company spin-offs as well as two company establishments and is founding ambassador of the K1 Gründerservice (start-up-service) of FSU Jena. He holds 52 patents/patent applications, 35 of which have been transferred to industry. He is also a member of the international advisory boards of ten scientific journals, guest editor of 14 special issues or books and two specialized textbooks. In October 2015, a publication in the scientific journal Nature attracted particular attention, in which a new metal-free redox flow battery based on polymers as active materials was presented. Schubert was also (co-)organizer of more than 25 international workshops, symposia and conferences.

== Coordination of scientific joint programmes ==
Ulrich S. Schubert was responsible for the coordination of the following joint programmes:

- 2009-2014: Coordinator of the Top Cluster PhoNa (BMBF, EUR 10 Mio.)
- 2009-2020: Coordinator of three ProExcellence programmes and applicant for two ProExcellence professorships, Free State of Thuringia (EUR 4,5 Mio.)
- 2011-2017: Coordinator of the DFG Priority Program (SPP 1568) "Design and Generic Principles of Self-healing Materials" (EUR 12 Mio.)
- 2017-2021: Spokesperson of the DFG Collaborative Research Center 1278 CRC PolyTarget (EUR 10 Mio.)
- Since 2019: Principal Investigator and Research Area Coordinator Cluster of Excellence (EXC) "Balance of the Microverse" / Excellence strategy of the federal and state governments (DFG / Science Council)
- Since 2019: Coordinator EU ITN "POLYSTORAGE" (EUR 4 Mio.)
- Since 2020: Coordinator Priority Programme "Polymer-based Batteries" (SPP 2248), DFG (EUR 12 Mio.)

The volume of third-party funding acquired since 2007 is in total EUR 60 Mio. In addition, Schubert has played a leading role in the university's new building projects with a total volume of EUR 130 Mio.

== Science related activities outside Jena ==
- 2003/2004: Guest professorship Université Catholique de Louvain, Belgium
- Since 2008: Member of the advisory board at the Fraunhofer Institute for Electronic Nano Systems ENAS, Chemnitz, Germany
- Since 2012: Member of the jury for the Innovation Award Thuringia, 2019 chairman of the jury
- 2013-2020: Member of the board of the division Macromolecular Chemistry of the German Chemical Society (Gesellschaft Deutscher Chemiker, GDCh), since 2015 Deputy Chairman of the Management Board
- Since 2014: Chairman of the supervisory board of the BMBF "zwanzig20" consortium "smart3", Dresden
- Since 2015: Member of the advisory board POLYMAT, University of the Basque Country, San Sebastián, Spain
- 2016-2020: Member of the review board 306-03 ("Polymer Materials") of the DFG, vice-chairman for Polymer Sciences. Re-elected as review board member for 2020–2024, chairman for Polymer Sciences
- Since 2017: Appointment as an external scientific member of the Max Planck Institute for Colloids and Interfaces in Potsdam and as a scientific member of the Max Planck Society
- 2018: Guest professorship at the Université Bordeaux, France
- Since 2018: member of the scientific advisory board of the Leibniz Institute DWI Aachen
- Since 2018: Member of the selection committee of the "Catalan Institution for Research and Advanced Studies" (ICREA), Spain
- 2019: Member of the advisory board of the Bavarian Center for Battery Technology (BayBatt) at the University of Bayreuth

== Scientific publications ==
- > 1.100 peer-reviewed publications in international journals
- Web-of-Science Ranking: Total number of citations > 50.500, h-Index 102
- Google Scholar: Total number of citations > 65.000, h-Index 116

== Prizes and awards ==
- 1996: Bavarian habilitation award (Zehetmair Price)
- 1998: Habilitation award of the Section Macromolecular Chemistry of the German Chemical Society (Gesellschaft Deutscher Chemiker, GDCh)
- 2004: VICI award (EUR 1,5 Mio.) of the Netherland Organization for Scientific Research, Netherlands
- 2009: Jan Pieter Lemstra Innovation Award, Dutch Polymer Institute (DPI), Netherlands
- 2010: International Biannual BPG Award, Belgian Polymer Group, Belgium
- 2013: Molecular Science Forum Professorship, Institute of Chemistry, Chinese Academy of Science (CAS), China
- 2013: Polymer Division Fellow, ACS Division of Polymer Chemistry, USA
- 2014: Fellow (FRSC), Royal Society of Chemistry, UK
- 2015: IQ Innovation Award Central Germany (IQ Innovationspreis Mitteldeutschland), JenaBatteries GmbH (Spin-off company)
- Since 2015: "Highly cited researcher", ISI Thomson Reuter / Clarivate Analytics
- Since 2015: Member selection committee for the Liebig commemorative coin (GDCh)
- 2015: Thuringian Innovation Award (Thüringer Innovationspreis), SmartDyeLivery GmbH (Spin-off company)
- 2016: Elected member National Academy of Science and Engineering (acatech)
- 2017: Thuringian Research Award for Applied Research
- 2017: Fellow of the National Academy of Inventors (NAI), USA
- 2018: Federal Cross of Merit with Ribbon, Federal Republic of Germany (Bundesverdienstkreuz), awarded by Federal President Steinmeier
- 2019: University Teacher of the Year, German University Association (Deutscher Hochschulverband, DHV) / DIE ZEIT
- 2019: Culture Prize of the City of Bayreuth (for the Easter Festival Bayreuth)

== Voluntary activities ==
Ulrich S. Schubert is the founder and chairman of the board of the Cultural and Social Foundation International Young Orchestra Academy (Internationale Junge Orchesterakademie, IJOA). In addition to international understanding and the promotion of young talent in the professional music field, the foundation's goal is to support children suffering from cancer and other serious illnesses by donating concerts and selling a benefit CD.

Ulrich S. Schubert received his musical training as a clarinetist in Frankfurt, Richmond and Tampa (both USA). Chamber music courses led him to the Abegg-Trio, Hagen-Quartett, Amadeus-Quartett, Jan Doormann and Francois Benda. He has given concerts in Europe and the USA.

Since May 2019 he has been a member of the Jena City Council (non-party and non-attached).

== Selected publications ==
- T. Hagemann, M. Strumpf, E. Schröter, C. Stolze, M. Grube, I. Nischang, M. D. Hager, Ulrich S. Schubert*: A (2,2,6,6-tetramethylpiperidin-1-yl)oxyl-containing zwitterionic polymer as catholyte species for high-capacity aqueous polymer redox flow batteries. In: Chem. Mater. 2019, 31, 7987 – 7999, doi: 10.1021/acs.chemmater.9b02201
- C. Stolze, J. Meurer, M. D. Hager, Ulrich S. Schubert*: An amperometric, temperature-independent, and calibration-free method for the real-time state-of-charge monitoring of redox flow battery electrolytes. In: Chem. Mater. 2019, 31, 5363 – 5369, doi: 10.1021/acs.chemmater.9b02376
- C. Englert, I. Nischang, C. Bader, P. Borchers, J. Alex, M. Proehl, M. Hentschel, M. Hartlieb, A. Traeger, G. Pohnert, S. Schubert, M. Gottschaldt*, U. S. Schubert*: Photo-induced release from nano- and microparticle containers. In: Angew. Chem. Int. Ed. 2018, 57, 2479 – 2482, doi: 10.1002/anie.201710756
- R. Tepper, S. Bode, R. Geitner, M. Jaeger, H. Goerls, J. Vitz, B. Dietzek, M. Schmitt, J. Popp, M. D. Hager*, U. S. Schubert*: Polymeric halogen bond based donor systems showing self-healing behavior in thin films. In: Angew. Chem. Int. Ed. 2017, 56, 4047 – 4051, doi: 10.1002/anie.201610406
- A.Wild, M. Strumpf, B. Haeupler, M. D. Hager, U. S. Schubert*: All-organic battery composed of thianthrene- and TCAQ-based polymers. In: Adv. Energy Mater. 2017, 7, 1601415, doi: 10.1002/aenm.201601415
- J. Winsberg, C. Stolze, S. Muench, F. Liedl, M. D. Hager, U. S. Schubert*: TEMPO/phenazine combi-molecule – A redox-active material for symmetric aqueous redox-flow batteries. In: ACS Energy Lett. 2016, 1, 976 – 980, doi: 10.1021/acsenergylett.6b00413
- J. Winsberg, T. Janoschka, S. Morgenstern, T. Hagemann, S. Muench, M. Billing, F. H. Schacher, G. Hauffman, J.-F. Gohy, M. D. Hager, U. S. Schubert*: Poly(TEMPO)/zinc hybrid-flow battery – A novel ‘green’, high voltage and safe energy storage system. In: Adv. Mater. 2016, 28, 2238 – 2242. doi: 10.1002/adma.201505000
- N. Kuhl, S. Bode, R. K. Bose, J. Vitz, S. Hoeppener, S. J. Garcia, S. van der Zwaag, M. D. Hager*, U. S. Schubert*: Acylhydrazones as reversible covalent crosslinkers for self-healing polymers. In: Adv. Funct. Mater. 2015, 25, 3295 – 3301, doi: 10.1002/adfm.201501117
- Tobias Janoschka, Norbert Martin, Udo Martin, Christian Friebe, Sabine Morgenstern, Hannes Hiller, Martin D. Hager, Ulrich S. Schubert: An aqueous, polymer-based redox-flow battery using non-corrosive, safe, and low-cost materials. In: Nature. 527, 2015, S. 78, doi:10.1038/nature15746.
- Adrian T. Press, Anja Traeger u. a.: Cell type-specific delivery of short interfering RNAs by dye-functionalised theranostic nanoparticles. In: Nature Communications. 5, 2014, S. 5565, doi:10.1038/ncomms6565.
- Almut M. Schwenke, Steffi Stumpf, Stephanie Hoeppener, Ulrich S. Schubert: Free-Standing Carbon Nanofibrous Films Prepared by a Fast Microwave-Assisted Synthesis Process. In: Advanced Functional Materials. 24, 2014, S. 1602–1608, doi:10.1002/adfm.201301749.
- Tobias Janoschka, Anke Teichler, Bernhard Häupler, Thomas Jähnert, Martin D. Hager, Ulrich S. Schubert: Reactive Inkjet Printing of Cathodes for Organic Radical Batteries. In: Advanced Energy Materials. 3, 2013, S. 1025–1028, doi:10.1002/aenm.201300036.
- Markus J. Barthel, Tobias Rudolph u. a.: Self-Healing Materials via Reversible Crosslinking of Poly(ethylene oxide)-block-Poly(furfuryl glycidyl ether) (PEO-b-PFGE) Block Copolymer Films. In: Advanced Functional Materials. 23, 2013, S. 4921–4932, doi:10.1002/adfm.201300469.
- Stefan Bode, Linda Zedler u. a.: Self-Healing Polymer Coatings Based on Crosslinked Metallosupramolecular Copolymers. In: Advanced Materials. 25, 2013, S. 1634–1638, doi:10.1002/adma.201203865.
- George R. Whittell, Martin D. Hager u. a.: Functional soft materials from metallopolymers and metallosupramolecular polymers. In: Nature Materials. 10, 2011, S. 176–188, doi:10.1038/nmat2966.
