= M. & N. Hanhart =

British lithographic printer and publisher

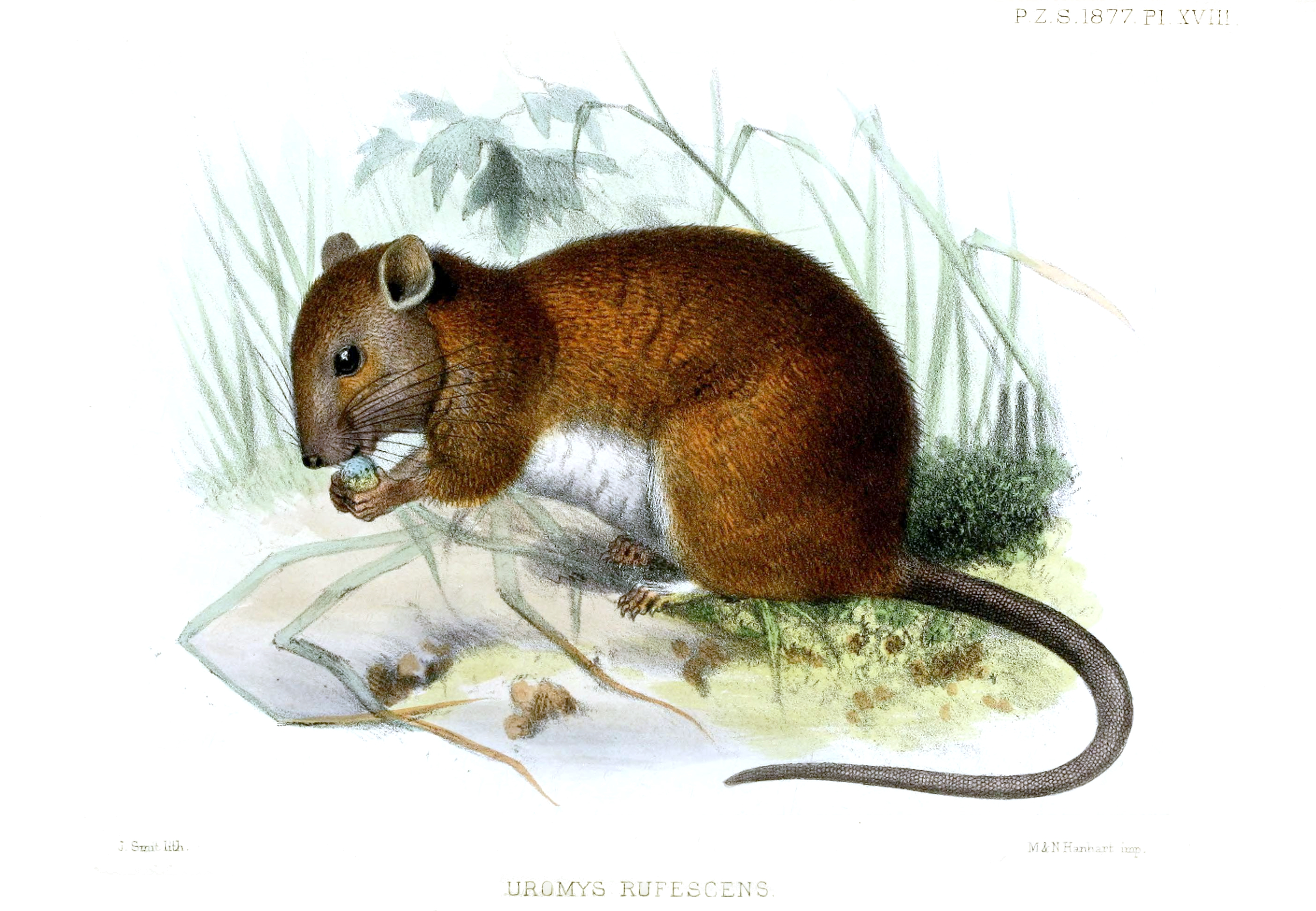
Uromys rufescens by M. & N. Hanhart

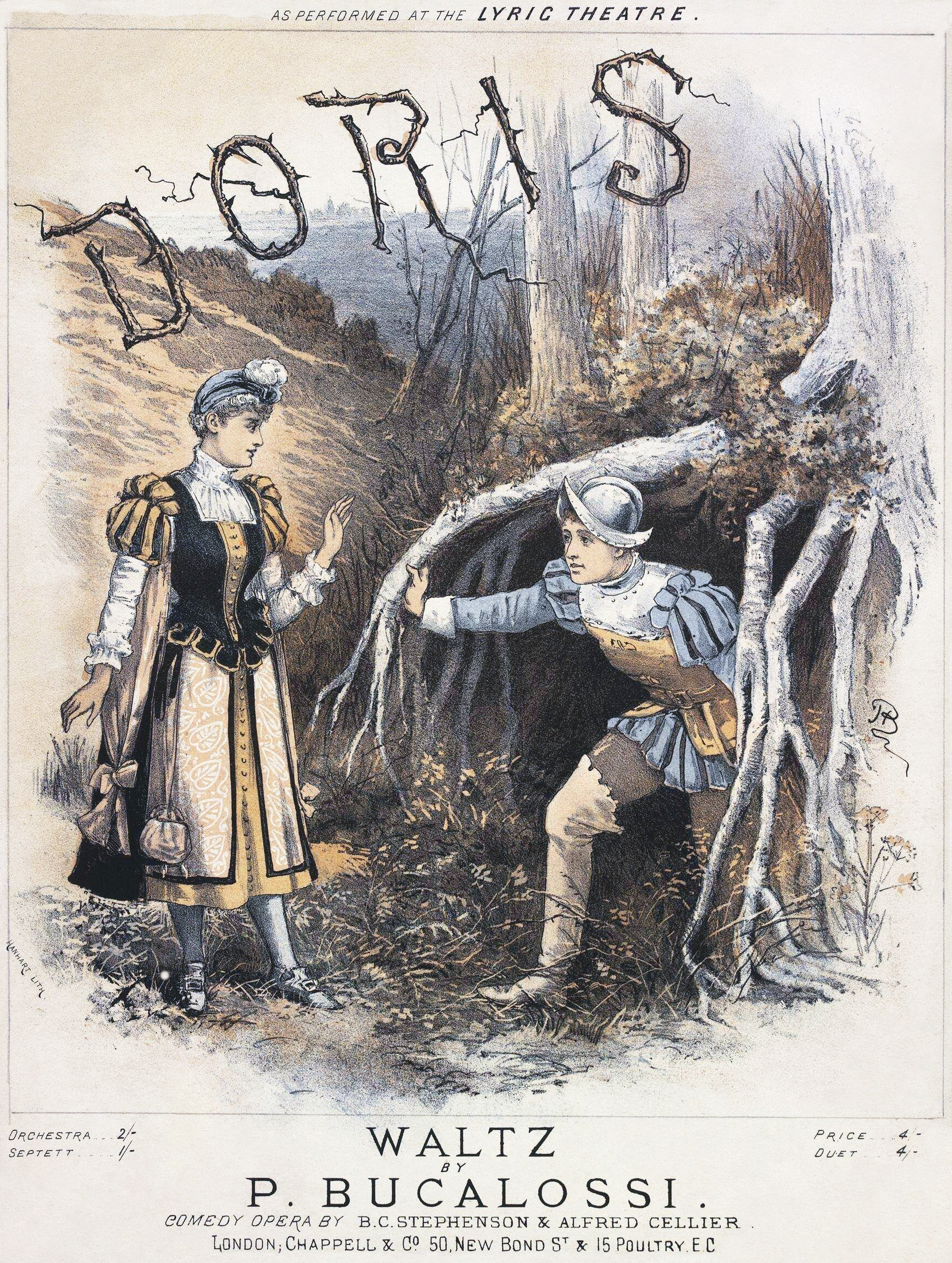
Lithograph by Nicholas, for a waltz arrangement of music from the opera Doris

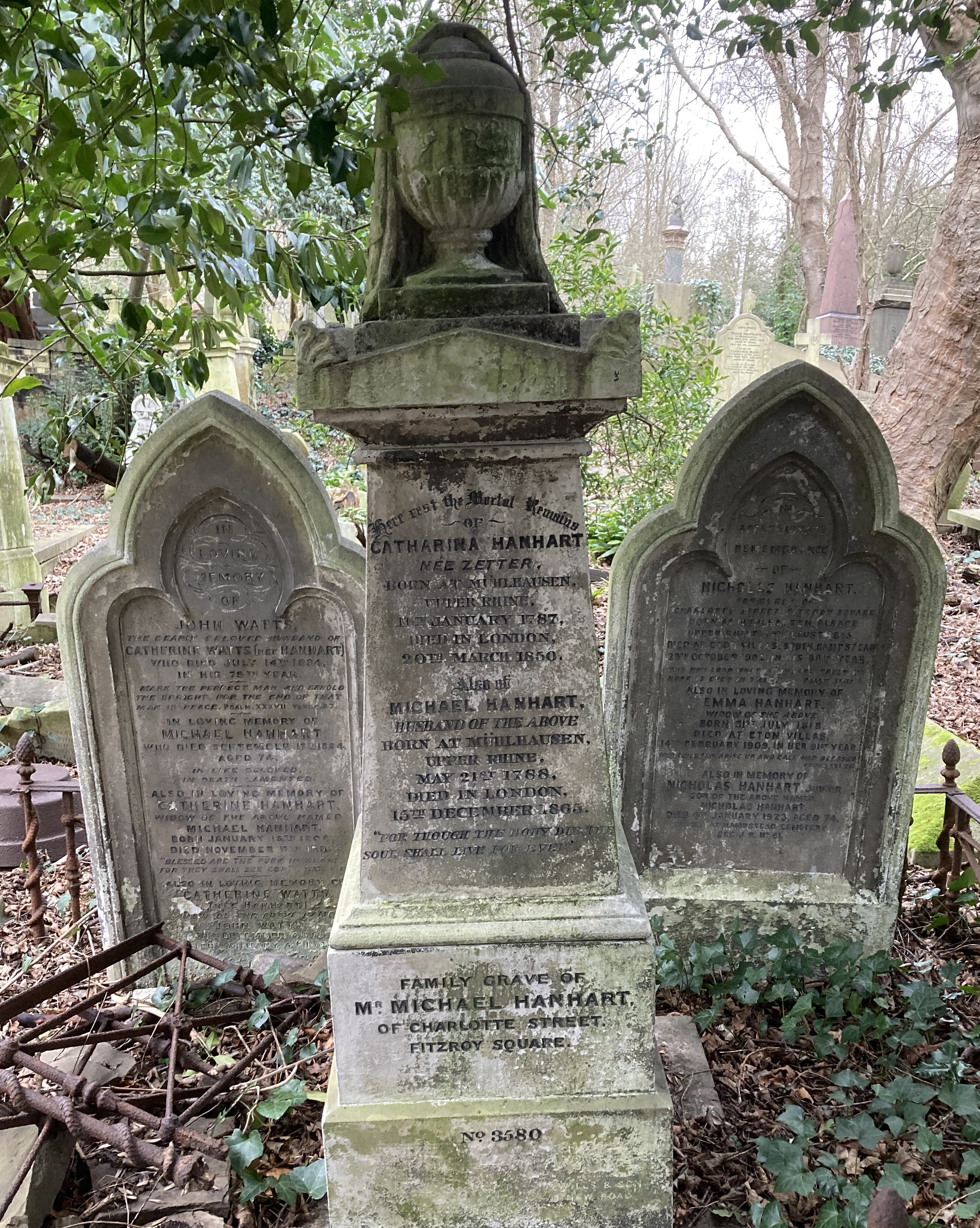
Graves of the Hanhart family in Highgate Cemetery (west side)

M. & N. Hanhart was a London lithographic publishing house founded by Michael Hanhart (21 May 1788 – 16 December 1865) and Nicholas Hanhart (1815–1902).

== History ==
The firm's heyday is considered to have been between 1839 and 1882. They published a wide range of material including book illustrations and lithographic sheet music covers. Their best work was in the field of large chromolithographs. Hanhart used a complex layering of tint stones, to produce work unique in colouration and tonal values.

== Family ==
The family were of French descent, Michael, his wife Catharina (née Zetter) and Nicholas having been born in Muhlhausen, Alsace, Upper Rhine. They, along with several other members of the Hanhart family, are buried together in Highgate Cemetery.
