= 1795 in art =

Events from the year 1795 in art.

== Events ==
- 4 May – The Royal Academy Exhibition of 1795 opens at Somerset House in London
- Nicolas-Jacques Conté patents the modern pencil 'lead' in France and produces the first Conté sticks.

== Works ==
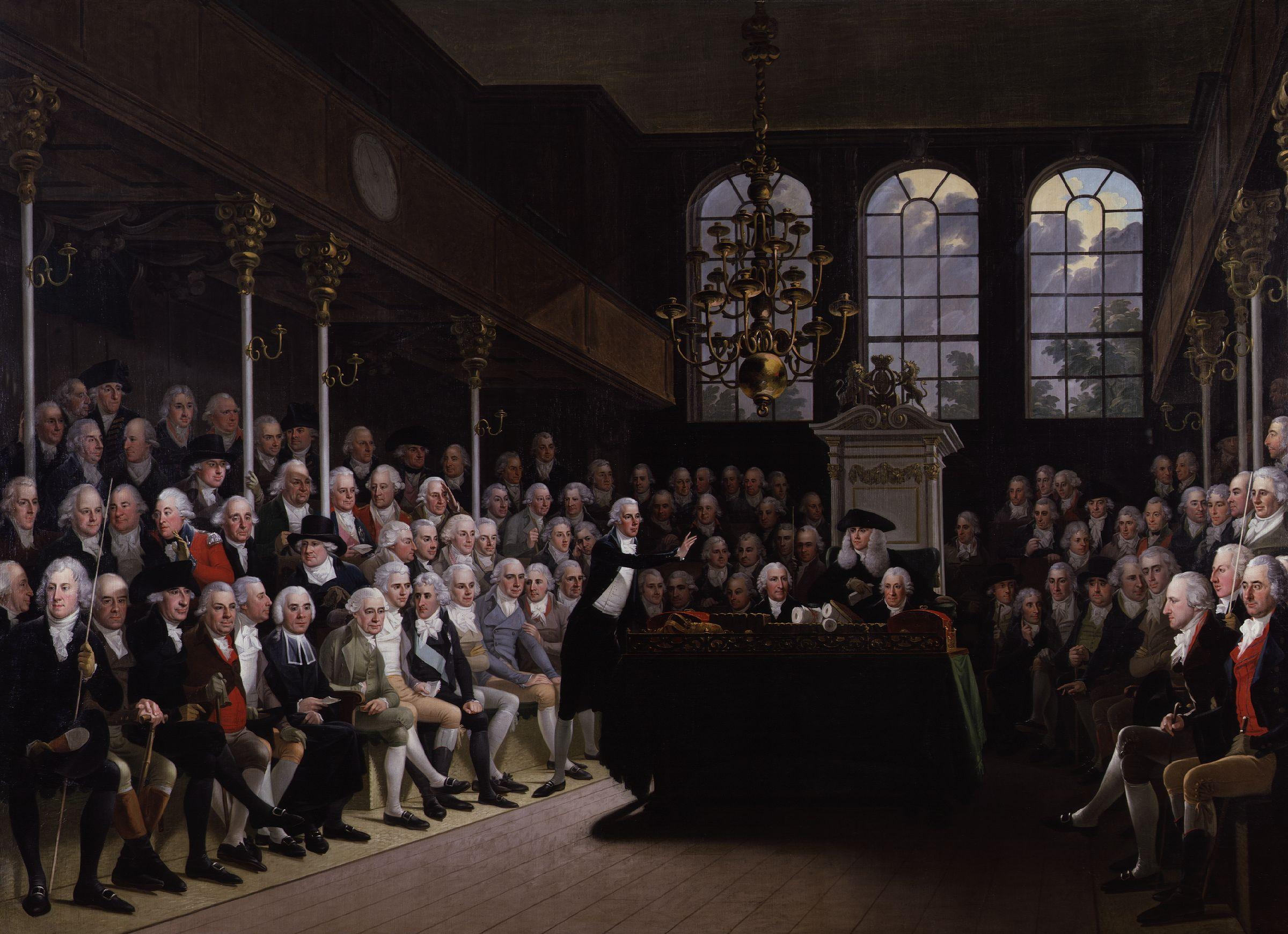
Anton Hickel's The House of Commons, 1793–94.

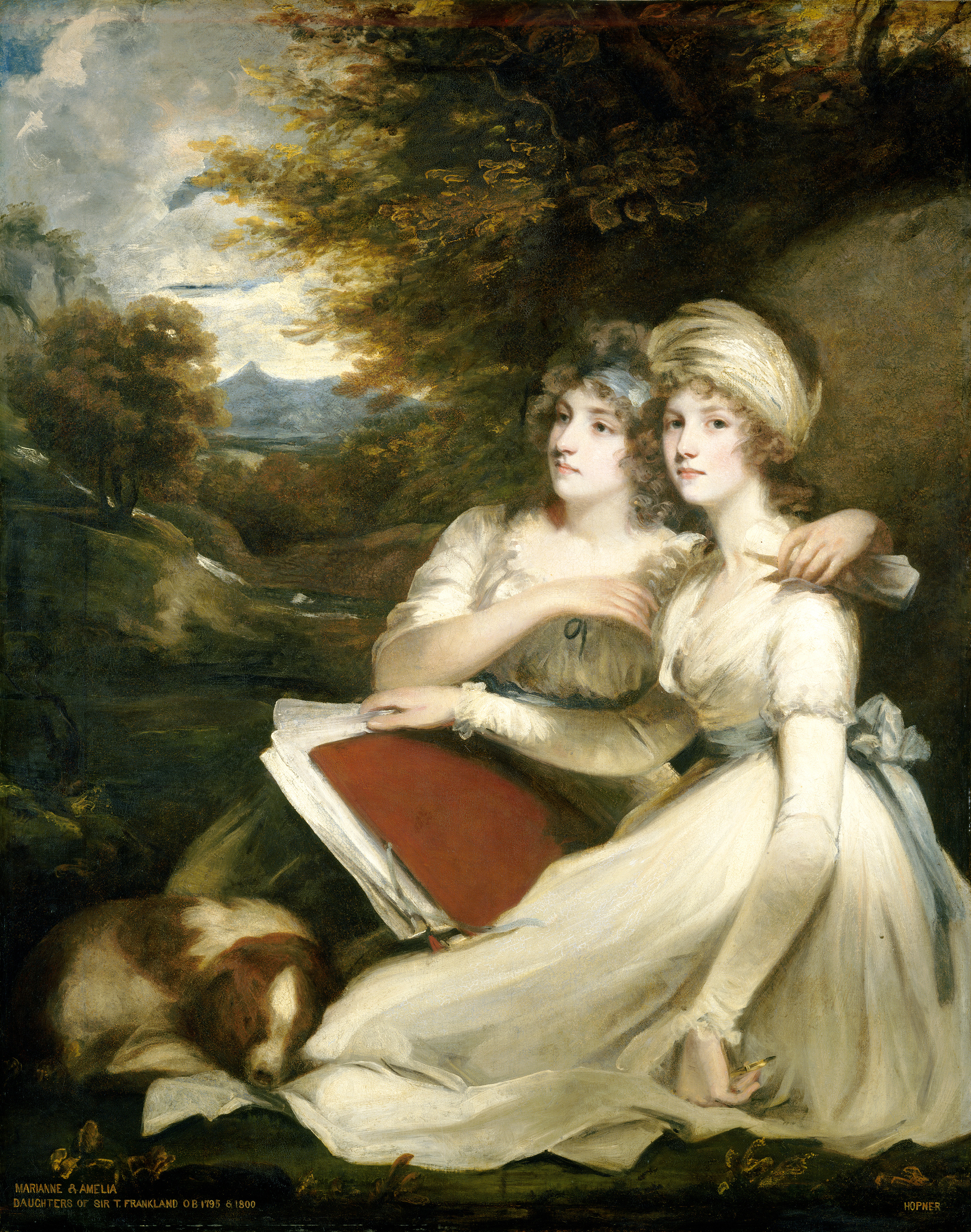
The Frankland Sisters by John Hoppner

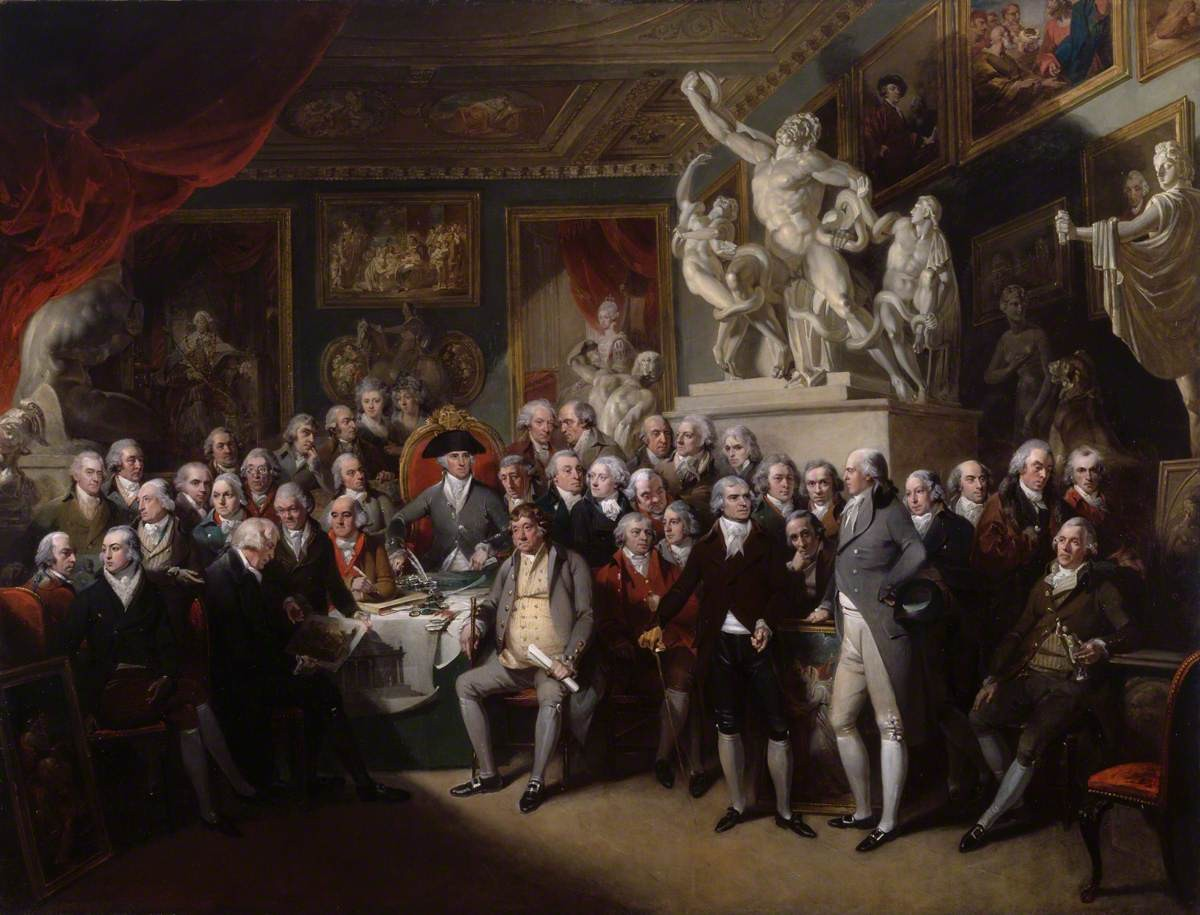
The Royal Academicians in General Assembly, Henry Singleton

- William Blake's monotypes Nebuchadnezzar, Newton, The Night of Enitharmon's Joy and Pity.
- Giuseppe Ceracchi's marble portrait bust of George Washington
- Jacques-Louis David – Portrait of Jacobus Blauw
- Anton Hickel's The House of Commons, 1793–94
- François-Xavier Fabre's Portrait of Lord Holland.
- François Gérard – Jean-Baptiste Isabey and His Daughter
- Francisco Goya's Self-portrait in the studio.
- Guillaume Guillon-Lethière's painting The Death of Cato of Utica
- John Hoppner
  - Portrait of Arthur Wellesley
  - The Frankland Sisters
- Philip James de Loutherbourg's painting Lord Howe's action, or the Glorious First of June.
- William Marlow – Capriccio: St Paul's and a Venetian Canal
- Charles Willson Peale - The Staircase Group
- Henry Singleton – The Royal Academicians in General Assembly
- Henry Tresham – The Earl of Warwick's Vow
- François-André Vincent – William Tell Overturning the Barque of Gessler
- Benjamin West
  - Harvesting at Windsor
  - Musidora and Her Two Companions

== Births ==
- February 10 – Ary Scheffer, French painter of Dutch extraction (died 1858)
- May 3 – Richard James Wyatt, English sculptor (died 1850)
- May 7 – William Fox-Strangways, English diplomat and art collector (died 1865)
- June 23 (bapt.) – William Wyon, English chief engraver at the Royal Mint (died 1851)
- July 11 – Amasa Hewins, American portrait, genre, and landscape painter (died 1855)
- September 12 – John Frederick Herring, Sr., English painter, sign maker and coachman (died 1865)
- October 20 – William Bewick, English portrait painter (died 1866)
- date unknown
  - William Behnes, English sculptor (died 1864)
  - 1795-1798: Stephen Poyntz Denning, English portraitist, artist and curator (died 1864)

== Deaths ==
- January 3 – Josiah Wedgwood, English potter (born 1730)
- January 13 – John Hickey, Irish-born sculptor (born 1756)
- June 12 – Johann Christian Brand, Austrian painter (born 1722)
- June 23 – Alexei Antropov, Russian barocco painter (born 1716)
- August 4 – Francisco Bayeu y Subías, Spanish painter in the Neoclassic style, primarily of religious and historical themes (born 1734)
- August 31 – Maruyama Ōkyo, Japanese painter (born 1733)
- October 6 - Johann Anton de Peters, German painter and etcher (born 1725)
- November 15 – Charles-Amédée-Philippe van Loo, French portrait painter (born 1719)
- November 18 – Antonio Cavallucci, Italian painter of the late Baroque (born 1752)
- December 1 – Antonio Zucchi, Italian painter of the Neoclassic period (born 1726)
- December 8 – Giovanni Battista Casanova, Italian painter and printmaker (born 1730)
- December 25 – John Alefounder, English portrait and miniature painter (born 1757)
- date unknown
  - Christophe-Gabriel Allegrain, French sculptor in the neoclassical style (born 1710)
  - Carlo Giuseppe Ratti, Italian art biographer and painter of the late-Baroque period (born 1737)
  - Francesco Sozzi, Italian painter (born 1732)
  - Paul Theodor van Brussel, Dutch flower painter (born 1754)
