= Harvesting at Windsor =

Painting by Benjamin West

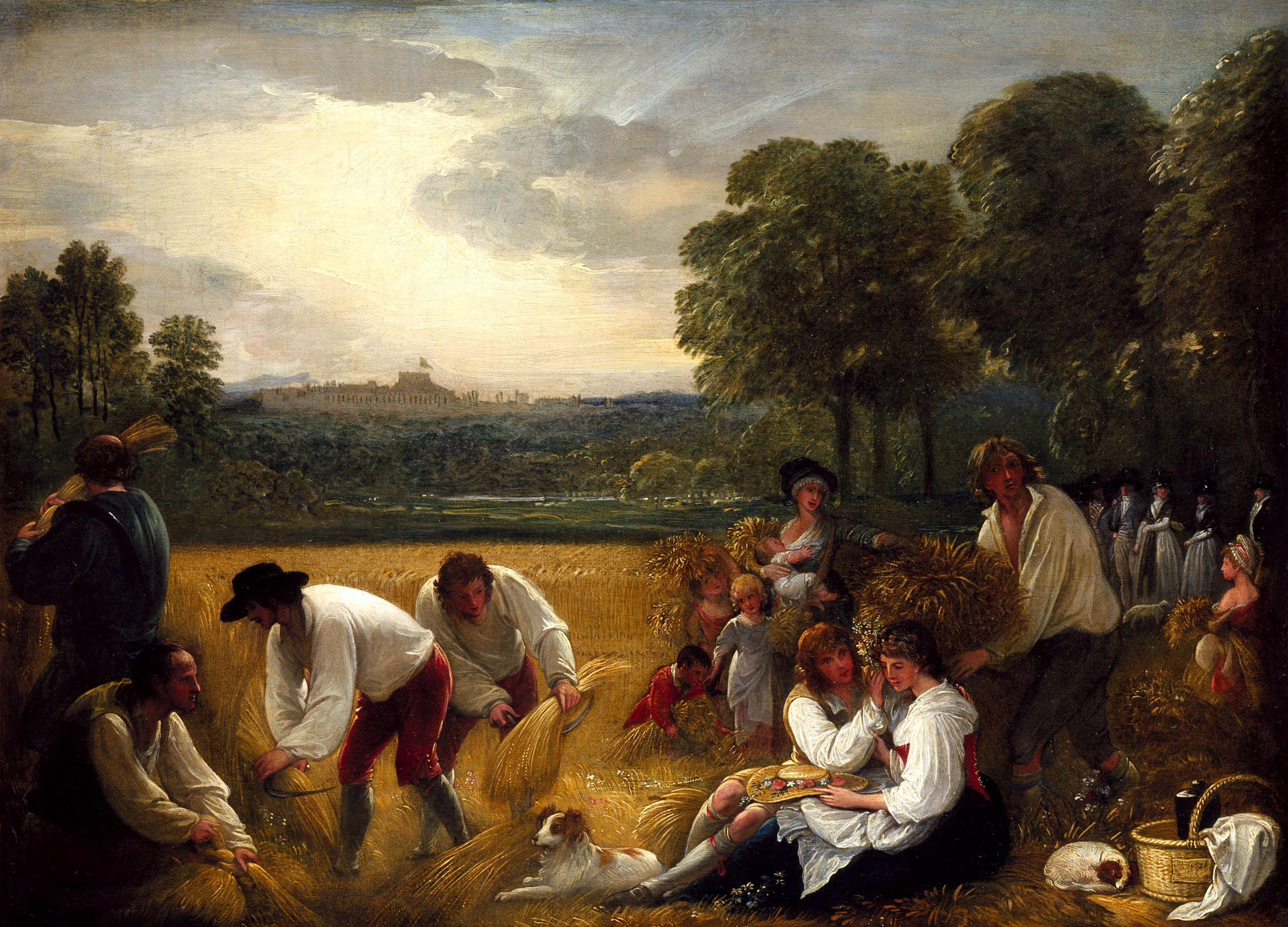
- Artist: Benjamin West
- Year: 1795
- Type: Oil on canvas, genre painting
- Dimensions: 50.8 cm × 68.5 cm (20.0 in × 27.0 in)
- Location: Denver Art Museum, Colorado

Harvesting at Windsor is a 1795 oil painting by the Anglo-American artist Benjamin West. A genre painting, it shows a group of labourers harvesting wheat near Windsor in Berkshire. Windsor Castle can be seen in the background. Benjamin West had succeeded Joshua Reynolds to become the second President of the Royal Academy in 1792. While West had become best known for his Neoclassical history paintings, he also produced a variety of genre scenes of more ordinary life including Gentlemen Fishing. Like that work, this painting may contain portraits of the artist's friend and possibly even a self-portrait. It was based on sketches he had had made in the Windsor area that year.

This work was possibly displayed at the Royal Academy Exhibition of 1796 held at Somerset House in London along with Woodcutters in Windsor Park. The previous year West had also exhibited a painting called Harvest Home at the 1795 edition. Unsold during West's lifetime, it was part of a major sale of his studio works by his sons in 1829. The painting is today in the collection of the Denver Art Museum in Colorado.

== Bibliography ==
- Alberts, Robert C. Benjamin West: A Biography. Houghton Mifflin, 1978.
- Grossman, Lloyd. Benjamin West and the Struggle to be Modern. Merrell Publishers, 2015.
- Kraemer, Ruth S. Drawings by Benjamin West and His Son, Raphael Lamar West. Pierpont Morgan Library, 1975.
