= Young Woman Overtaken by a Storm =

Painting by Féréol Bonnemaison

- Artist: Féréol Bonnemaison
- Year: 1799
- Type: Oil on canvas, genre painting
- Dimensions: 100 cm × 80.5 cm (39 in × 31.7 in)
- Location: Brooklyn Museum; New York City

Young Woman Overtaken by a Storm (French: Une Jeune Femme s'étant Avancée dans la Campagne se Trouve Surprise par l'orage) is a 1799 oil painting by the French artist Féréol Bonnemaison. It depicts a young woman caught in a storm. She is wearing very light translucent clothing, exposing her to the elements. Gothic in style, it has been taken to be an allegorical reference to the chaos that had followed the French Revolution. Bonnemaison himself had fled into exile in Britain during the Reign of Terror. It's Romanticism went against the prevailing Neoclassicism of Revolutionary France typified by Jacques-Louis David. The work was displayed at the Salon of 1799 held at the Louvre in Paris. Today the painting is in the Brooklyn Museum in New York City.

== Bibliography ==
- Flint, Kate. Flash!: Photography, Writing, & Surprising Illumination. Oxford University Press, 2017.
- Rabine, Leslie W. & Melzer, Sara E. (ed.) Rebel Daughters: Women and the French Revolution. Oxford University Press, 1992.
- Rauser, Amelia. The Age of Undress: Art, Fashion, and the Classical Ideal in the 1790s Yale University Press, 2020.
