= Crown Collection =

Canadian collection of art and other items

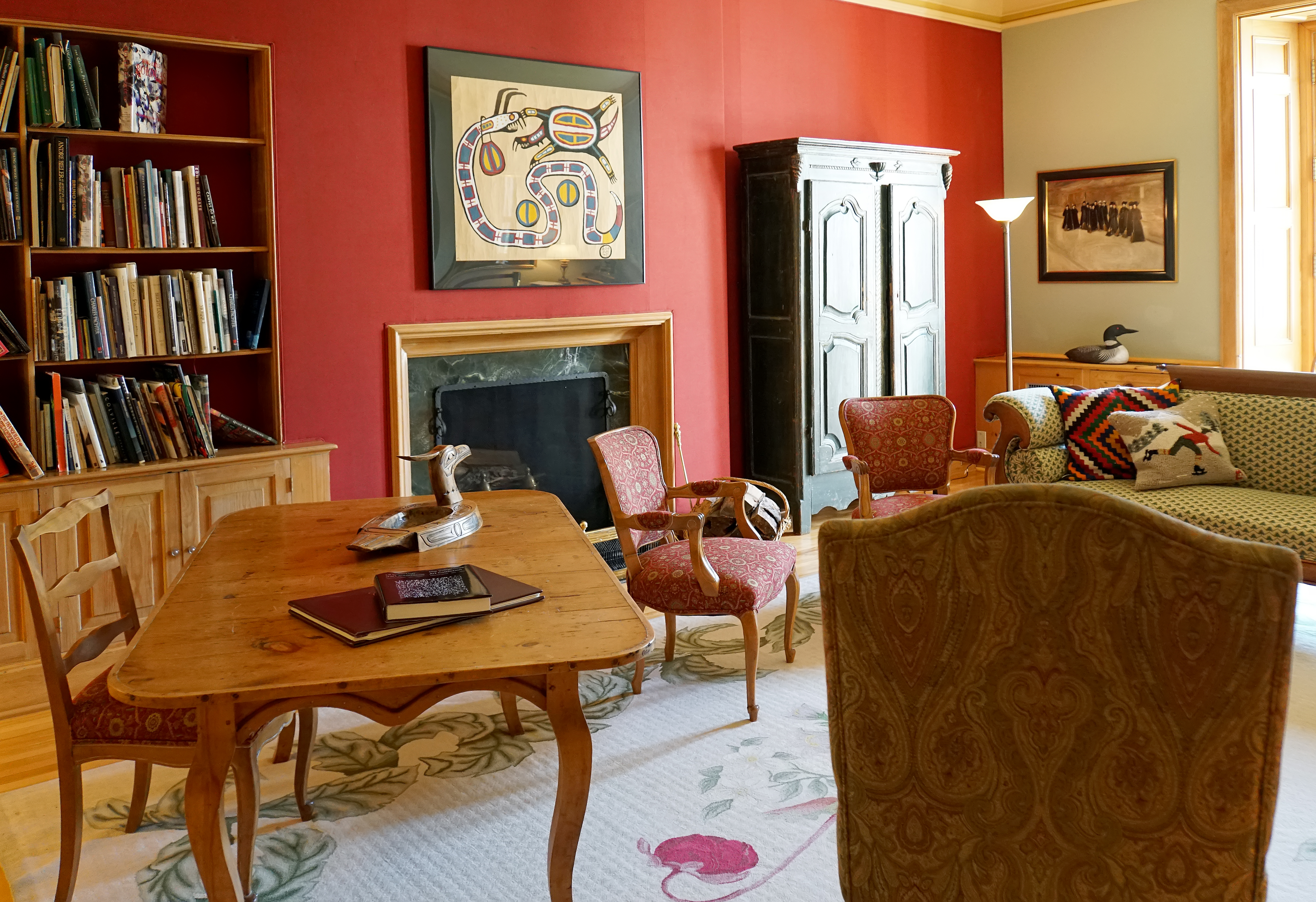
While the monarch's and viceroy's official Ottawa residence, Rideau Hall, is furnished throughout with pieces from the Crown Collection, the Pauline Vanier room is specifically designated to showcase distinctly Canadian art and craftsmanship.

The Crown Collection is the assemblage of more than 7,000 objects, including contemporary and antique art and furnishings, books, rugs, and other objects owned by the sovereign in right of Canada, many of which are used to furnish the country's official residences.

The collection is managed by the National Capital Commission and pieces are acquired either as gifts from philanthropic benefactors to, or through purchase by, the Canadiana Foundation, an organisation established in 2005 specifically to manage the furnishings of the official residences and which is under the patronage of the governor general of Canada. The foundation collects, via its Canadiana Fund (established in 1990), donations of both money and pieces that have been approved by the Canadian Cultural Property Export Review Board as having "outstanding significance or national importance". A curator oversees acquisitions, research, conservation, inventory management, de-accessioning, loans, and all agreements with donors, partners, and stakeholders.

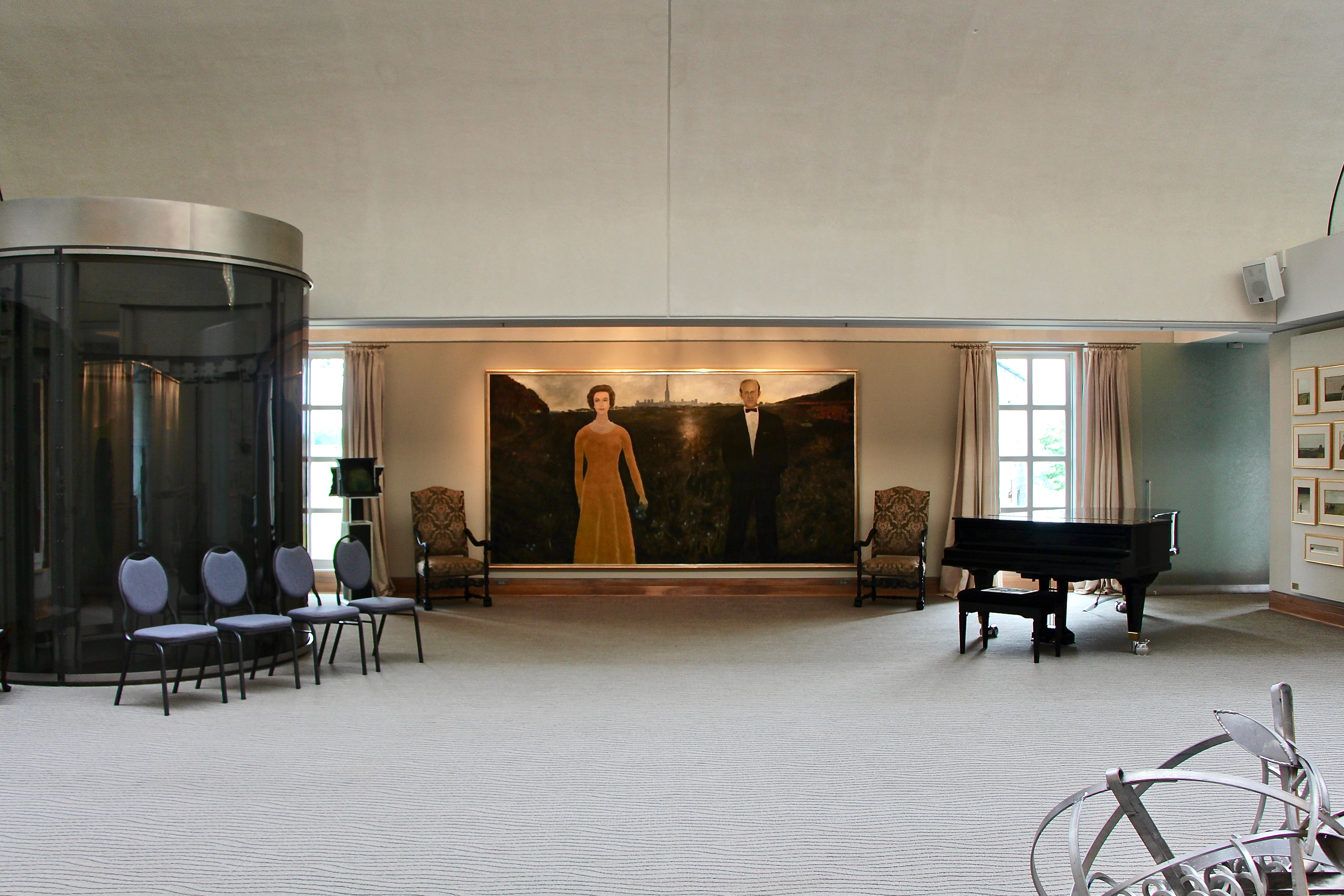
Jean Paul Lemieux's 1979 work affectionate memory images, in the monarch's and governor general's residence at la Citadelle, in Quebec City

Works are generally by Canadian artists and craftsmen and/or are of significance in Canadian history, such as the MacKay-Keefer Legacy Cup, created in 1831 to commemorate the construction of the Rideau Canal; a Last Spike Pin, made from the bent last spike driven by the Lord Strathcona and Mount Royal into the Canadian Pacific Railway; a tall-case clock produced in 1825 by J. B. Twiss of Montreal, and a Quebec pine armoire crafted in the Louis Quinze style between 1750 and 1760. Also in the collection is the piece 24 heures de l'Isle-aux-Oyes by Jean-Paul Riopelle, as well as the Grant de Longueuil Epergne, a silver centrepiece made in 1759. The collection does also hold, however, pieces from Europe and the Far East.

Pieces used in Canada's official residences are selected so as to reflect the country's "diverse artistic and cultural traditions"; all art displayed is by Canadian artists, including Inuit works. Public Services and Procurement Canada oversees the Crown Collection pieces that have been installed in the official residences, keeping inventory and commissioning any necessary restoration.

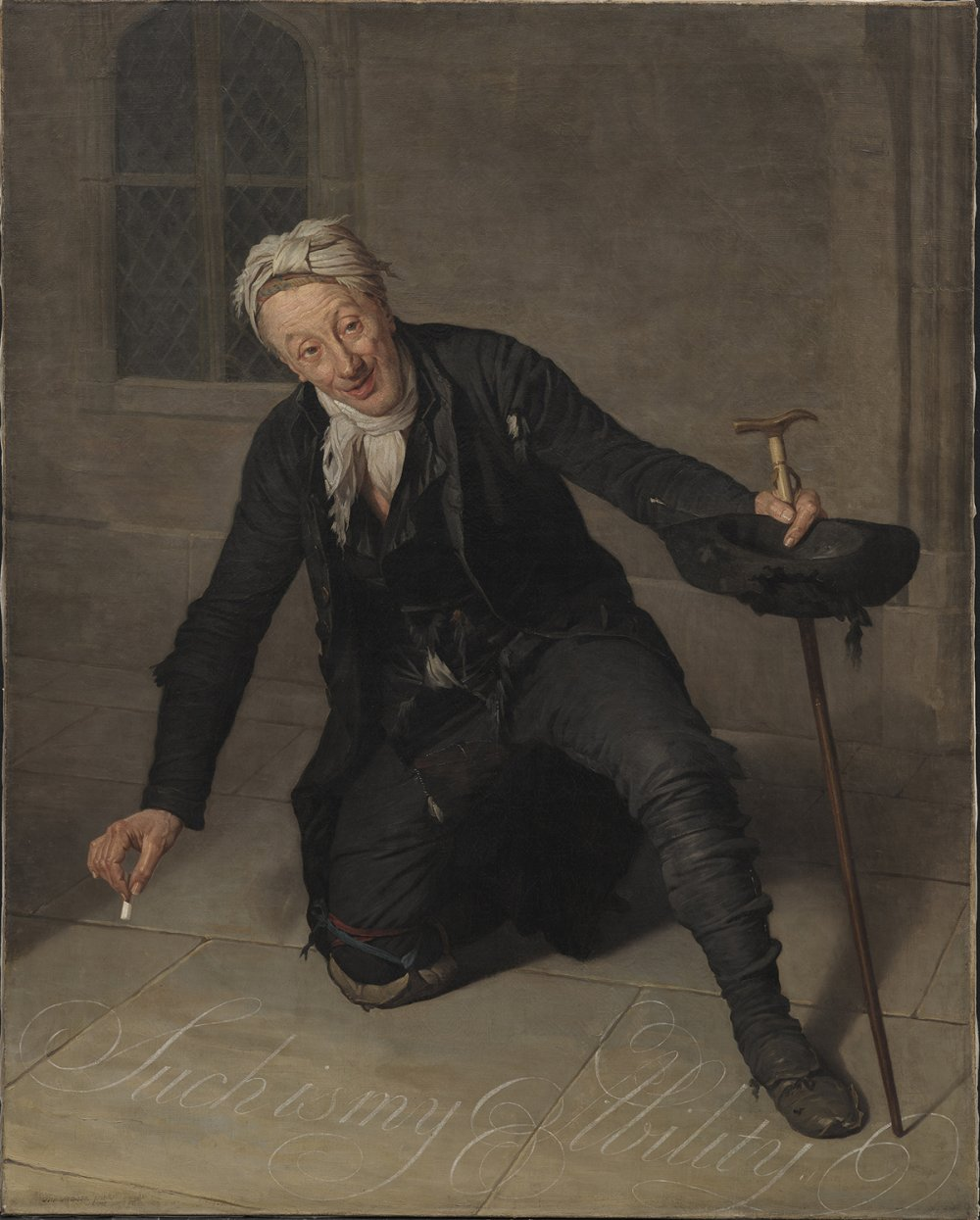
Whitfield, the Writer on the Pavement, 1795, a painting by Féréol Bonnemaison in the Official Residences Crown Collection

== See also ==
- Royal Collection
