= Jean-Baptiste Isabey =

French painter (1767–1855)

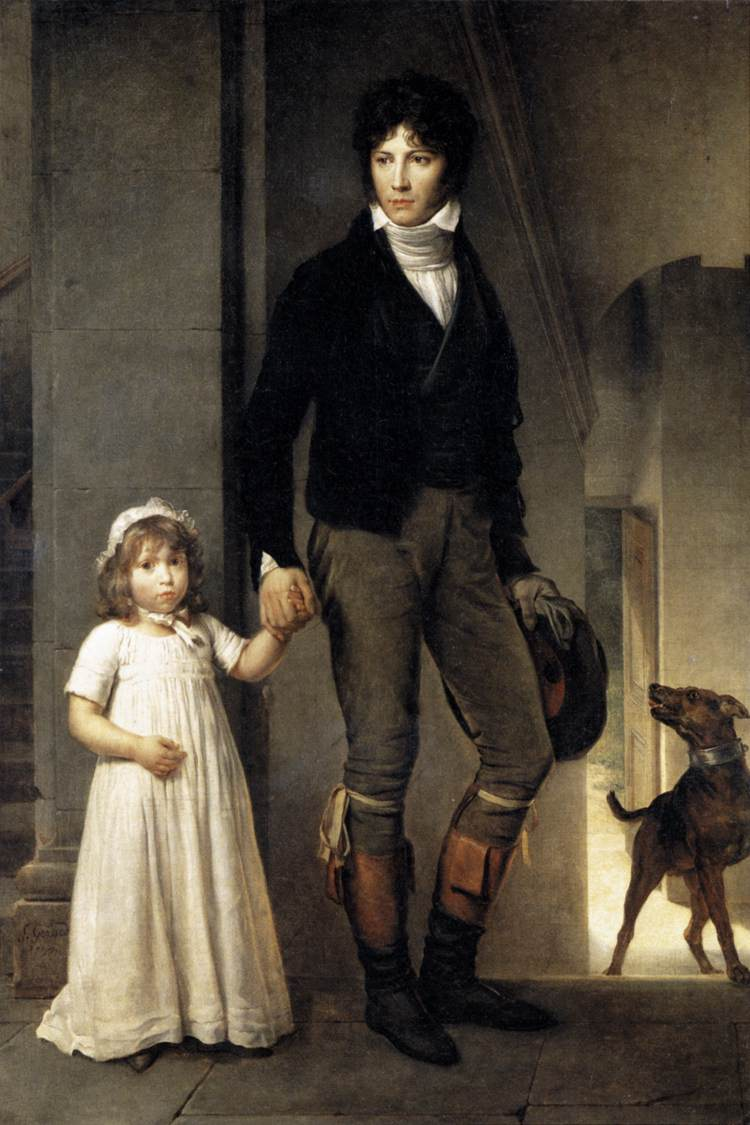
Jean-Baptiste Isabey and His Daughter depicted in a 1795 portrait by François Gérard

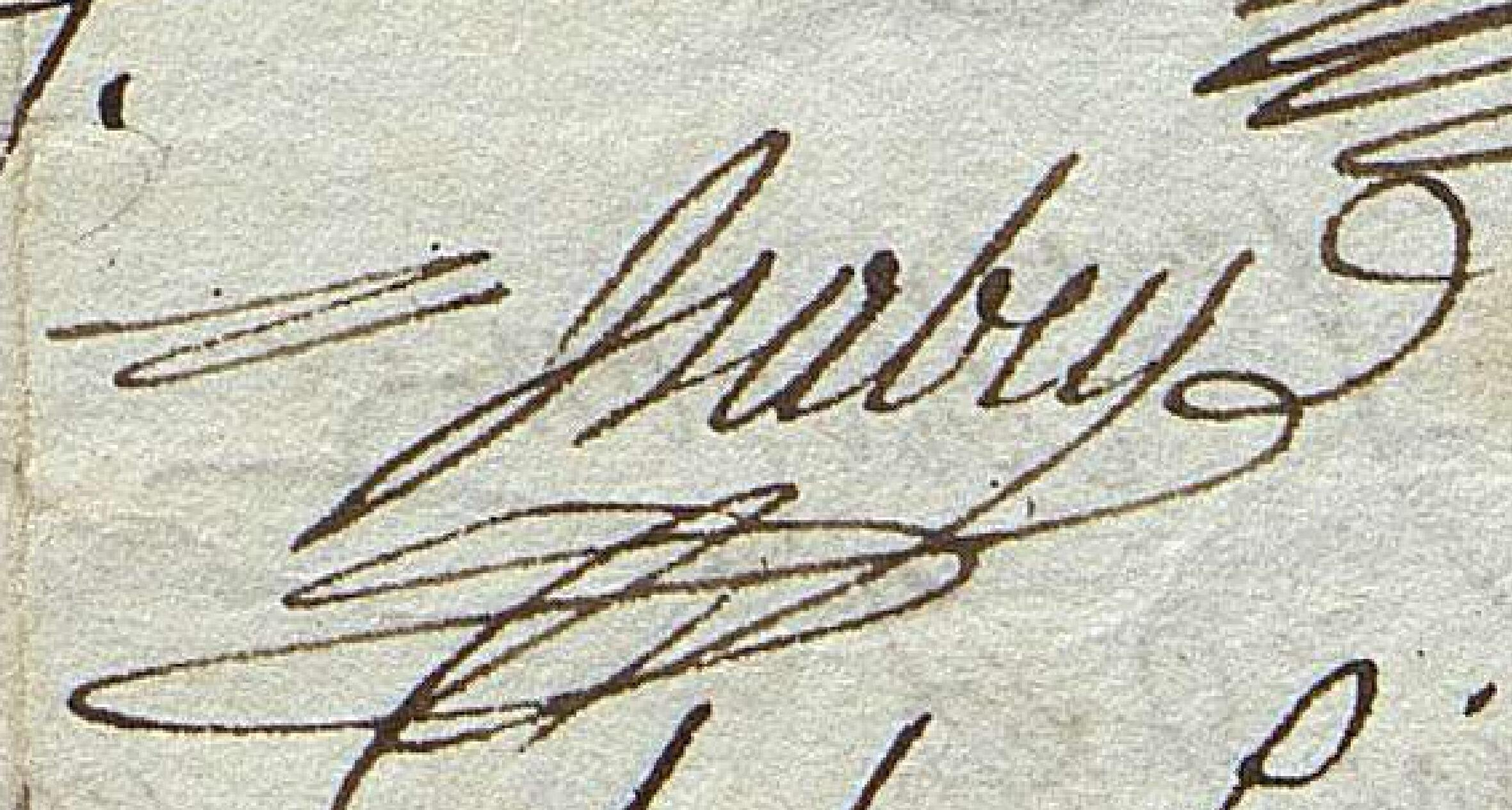

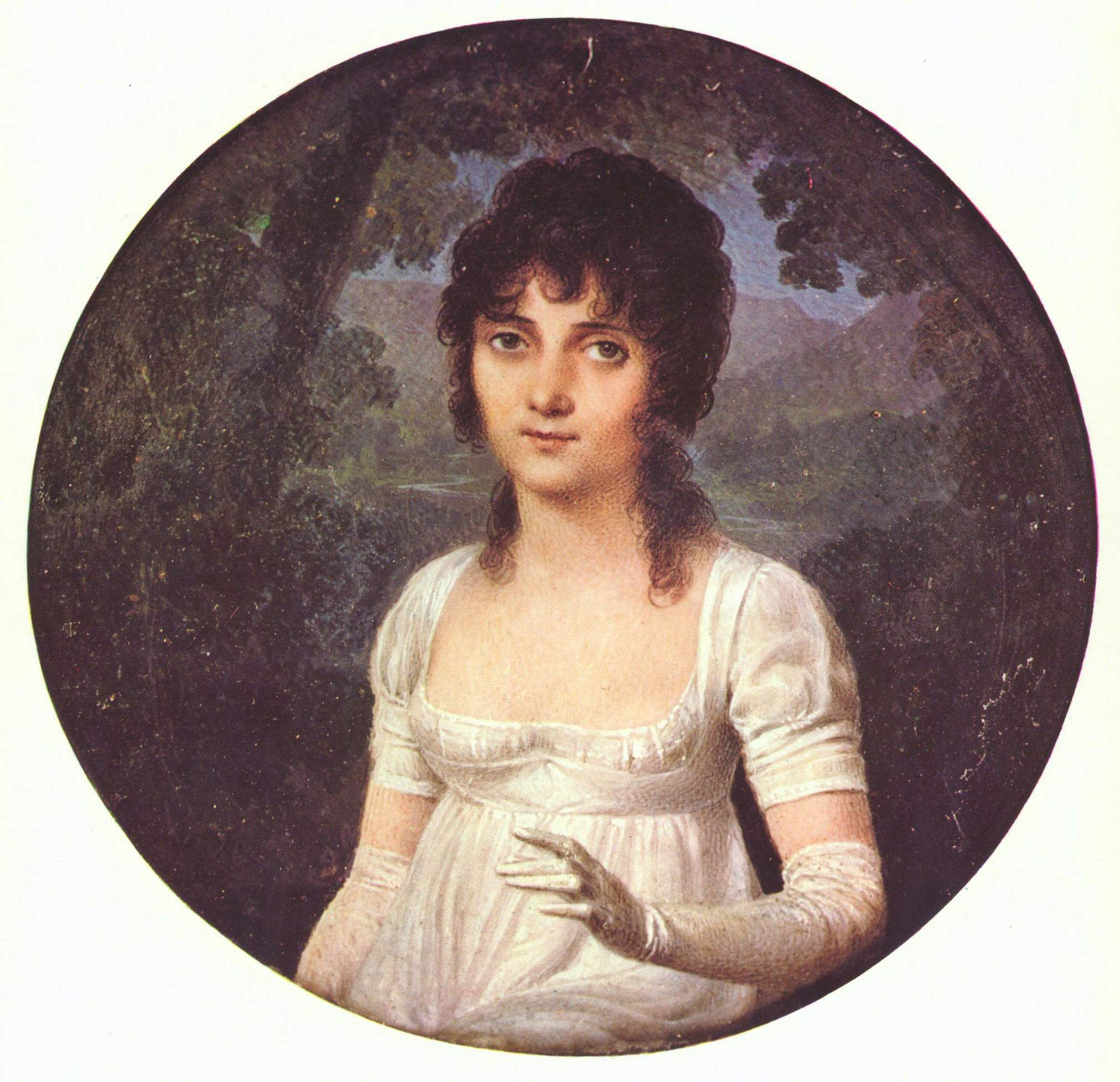
A miniature of Christine Boyer by Isabey in the beginning of the 19th century

Jean-Baptiste Isabey (French pronunciation: [ʒɑ̃ batist izabɛ]; 11 April 1767 – 18 April 1855) was a French artist during both the First Empire and the Restoration.

His son Eugène Isabey also became a painter, known for his Romantic seascapes.

== Early life and education ==
Isabey was born in Nancy, France on 11 April 1767. At the age of 19, following some lessons from Francois Dumont, the miniature painter to Marie Antoinette, Isabey became a pupil of Jacques-Louis David.

== Career ==
Isabey was hired by the Palace of Versailles to paint portraits of the dukes of Angoulême and Berry. He was commissioned by the queen, the first of several commissions he was awarded by successive French rulers until his death in 1855.

Patronized by Josephine and Napoleon Bonaparte, he arranged the ceremonies of their coronation and prepared drawings for the publication intended as its official commemoration. After the Restoration, he was paid for his work by Louis XVIII, whom he painted a portrait of (engraved by Philibert-Louis Debucourt) which was completed in 1814. Although Isabey did homage to Napoleon on his return from Elba, he continued to enjoy the favour of the Restoration, and took part in arrangements for the coronation of Charles X.

The July Monarchy conferred on him an important post in connection with the royal collections, and Napoleon III granted him a pension, and the cross of commander of the Legion of Honor. Review of Troops by the First Consul was one of his most important compositions.

Isabey's Boat, which was engraved by Charles Paul Landon, is a drawing of Isabey and his family. Produced at a time when Isabey was occupied with lithography, Boat was a great success at the Salon of 1820. His portrait, Napoleon at Malmaison, is considered his best, and his tiny head of the King of Rome, painted for a breast-pin, is distinguished by decision and breadth.

A biography of Isabey was published by Edmond Taigny in 1859. Charles Lenormant's article, written for Joseph-François Michaud's Biographie Universelle, was based on facts furnished by Isabey's family.

== Sources ==
- Basily-Callimaki, Eva de, Mme, J.B. Isabey: sa vie, son temps, 1767-1855: Suivi du Catalogue de l'oeuvre gravée par et d'apres Isabey
- Chaudonneret, Marie-Claude (2003). "Isabey, Jean-Baptiste". Grove Art Online.
