= Féréol Bonnemaison =

French painter (1766–1827)

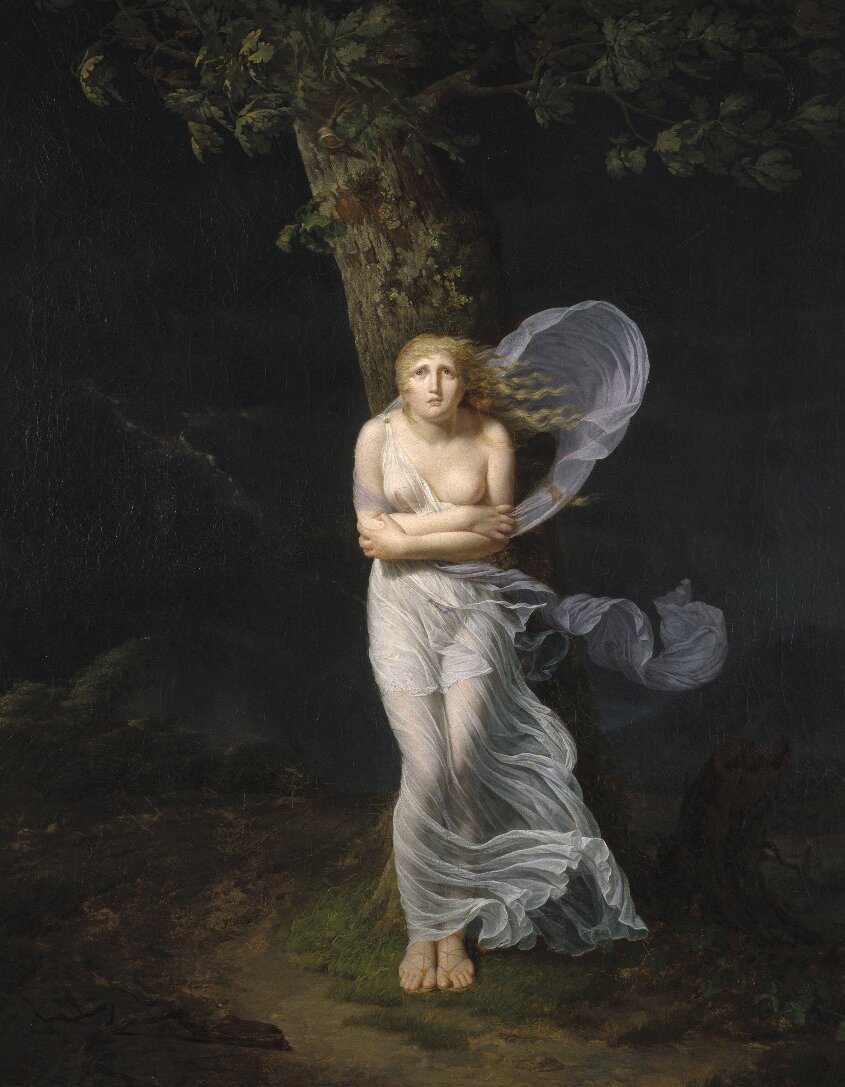
Féréol Bonnemaison, Young Woman Overtaken by a Storm, c. 1799, oil on canvas, 100 × 80.5 cm. Brooklyn Museum

Féréol Bonnemaison (8 February 1766 – 22 August 1827) was a French portrait painter, lithographer, restorer, and art dealer.

== Life ==
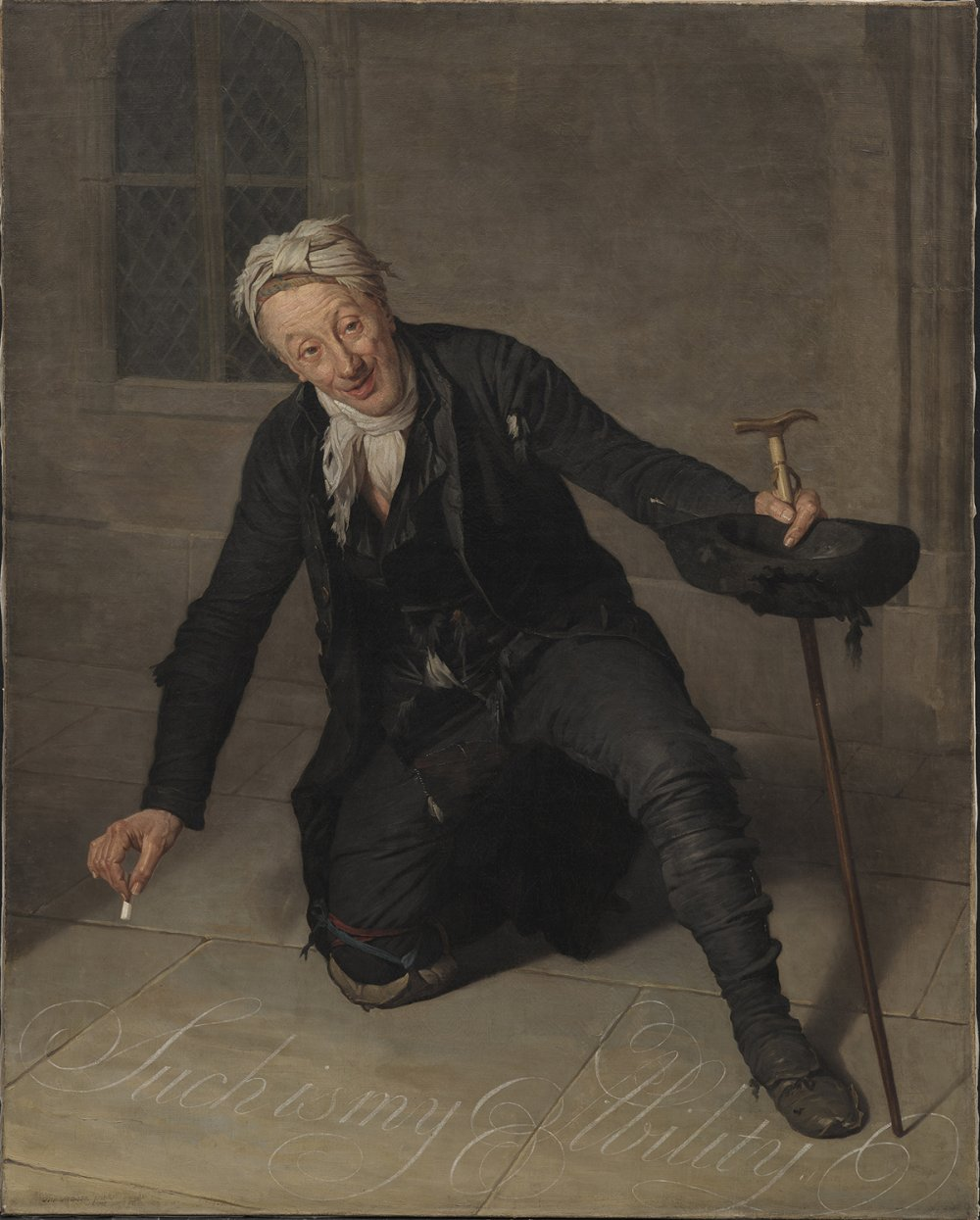
Whitfield, the Writer on the Pavement, by Féréol Bonnemaison, painted in England and exhibited at the Royal Academy Exhibition of 1795 (Ottawa, National Capital Commission, Official Residences Crown Collection.

Born 8 February 1766 in Toulouse, Bonnemaison was educated in Montpellier. Following the French Revolution he fled to England, but returned to France shortly afterwards, and exhibited portraits and other works at the Paris Salon from the Salon of 1796 onwards.

He restored five paintings by (or at least then believed to be by) Raphael, which Joseph Bonaparte had removed from the Spanish royal collection and taken to Paris, and oversaw the transfer of four of them from panel to canvas. For this he was awarded the Légion d’Honneur by Louis XVIII. Johann David Passavant believed that Bonnemaison had mistreated the works, supporting his claim with an anecdote told to him by Jacques-Louis David:

On visiting Bonnemaison one day, at his studio, David found him, to his great consternation, with a sponge full of spirits of turpentine in his hand, with which he was most unmercifully rubbing the injured parts; and that to all his remonstrances on the danger of such a proceeding he could elicit no answer beyond, "That's of no consequence, turpentine is good for them".

As an art dealer he is recorded as having sold 150 pictures from the collection of Prince Vincenzo Giustiniani to Frederick William III of Prussia in 1815, and two years later he sold Talleyrand's collection of Dutch and Flemish works to a fellow dealer, William Buchanan. He acted as an agent for the Duke of Wellington, buying pictures, including some notable Dutch genre paintings, on his behalf at auctions in Paris in 1817 and 1818. Wellington also commissioned him to make full-sized copies of four of the Raphaels seized from Spain before their return to Madrid in 1818.

In 1818, he published a Suite d'études calquées et dessinées d'après cinq tableaux de Raphael, and in 1822 a series of lithographs after recent French paintings in the gallery of the Duchess de Berry.

He died in Paris on 22 August 1827, aged 61.

== Selected works owned by Bonnemaison ==
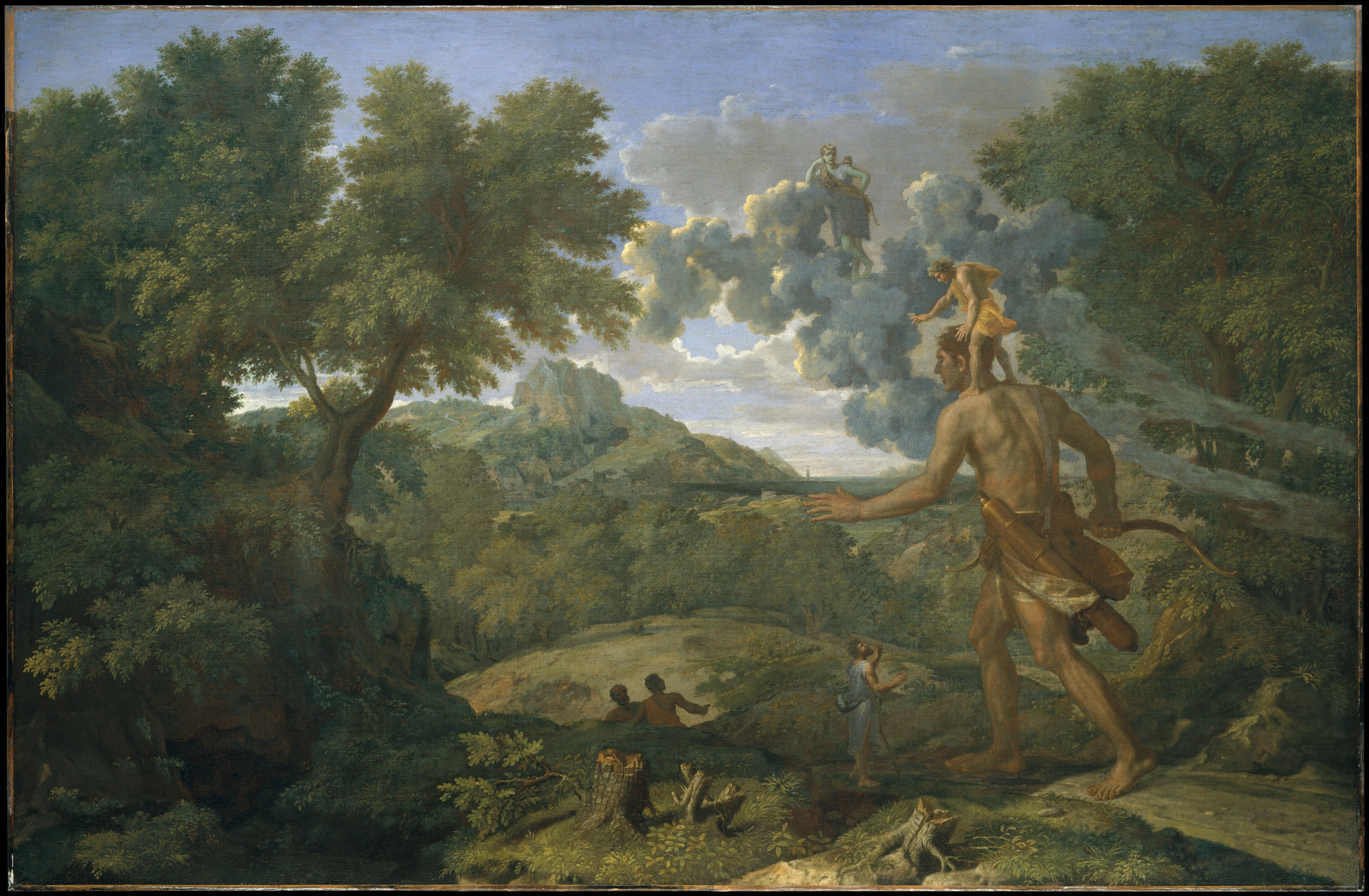
Nicolas Poussin, Blind Orion Searching for the Rising Sun (1658), The Metropolitan Museum of Art, New York

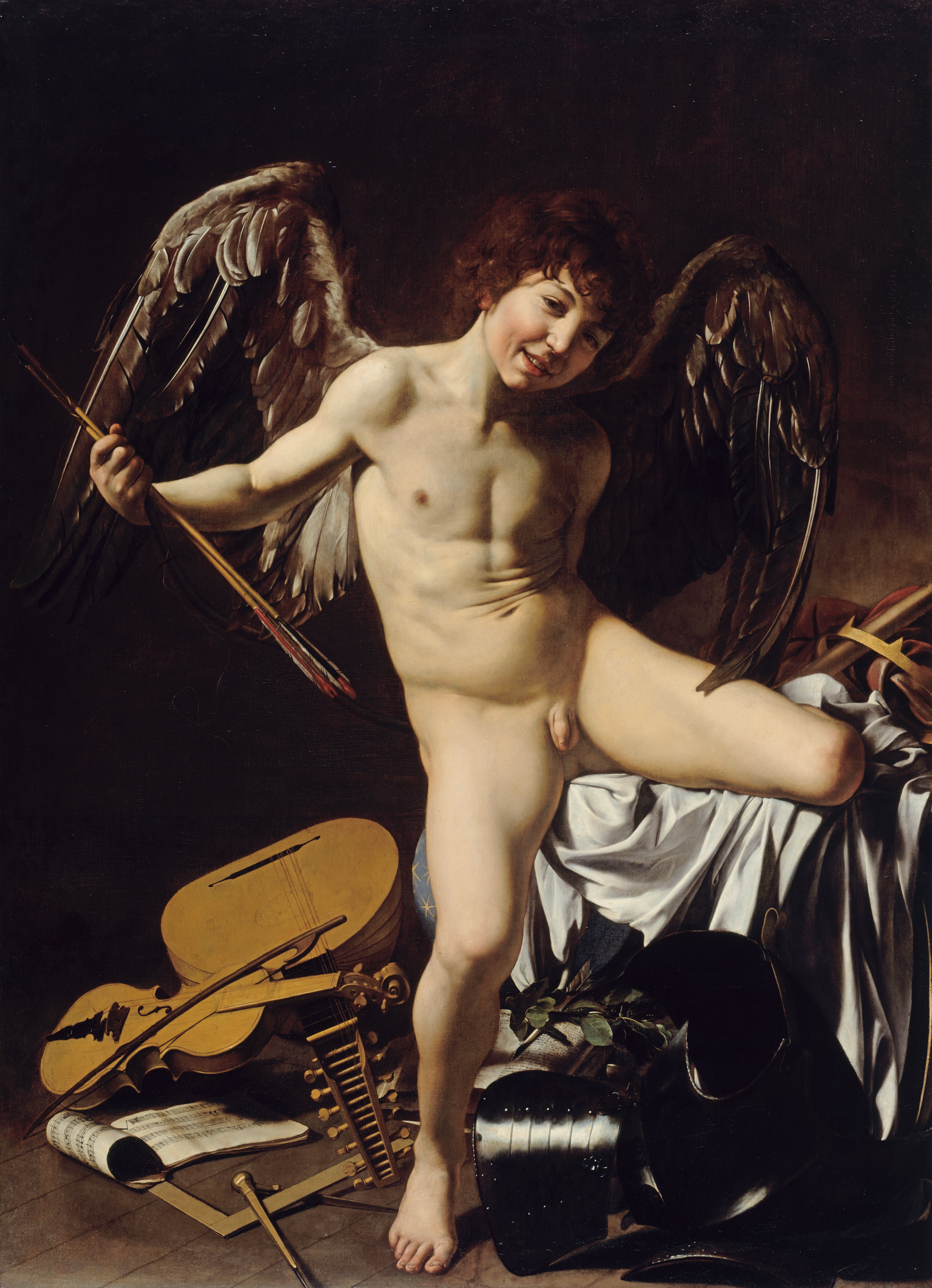
Caravaggio, Amor Vincit Omnia (1602-1603), Gemäldegalerie, Berlin

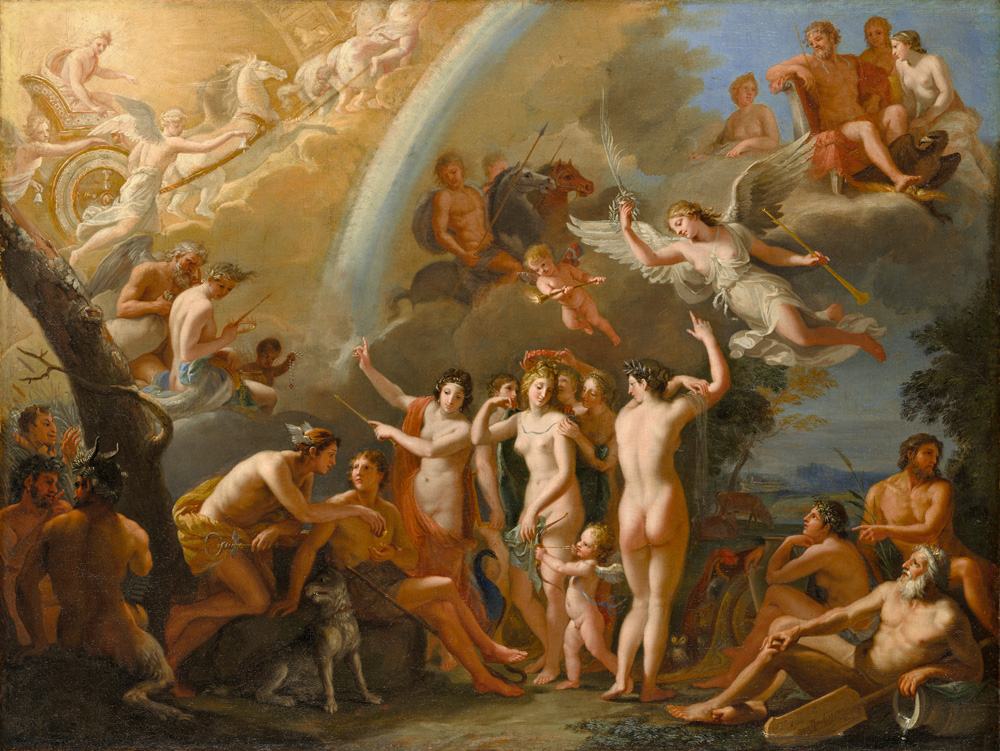
Jacques Stella, The Judgement of Paris (1650), Wadsworth Atheneum, Hartford

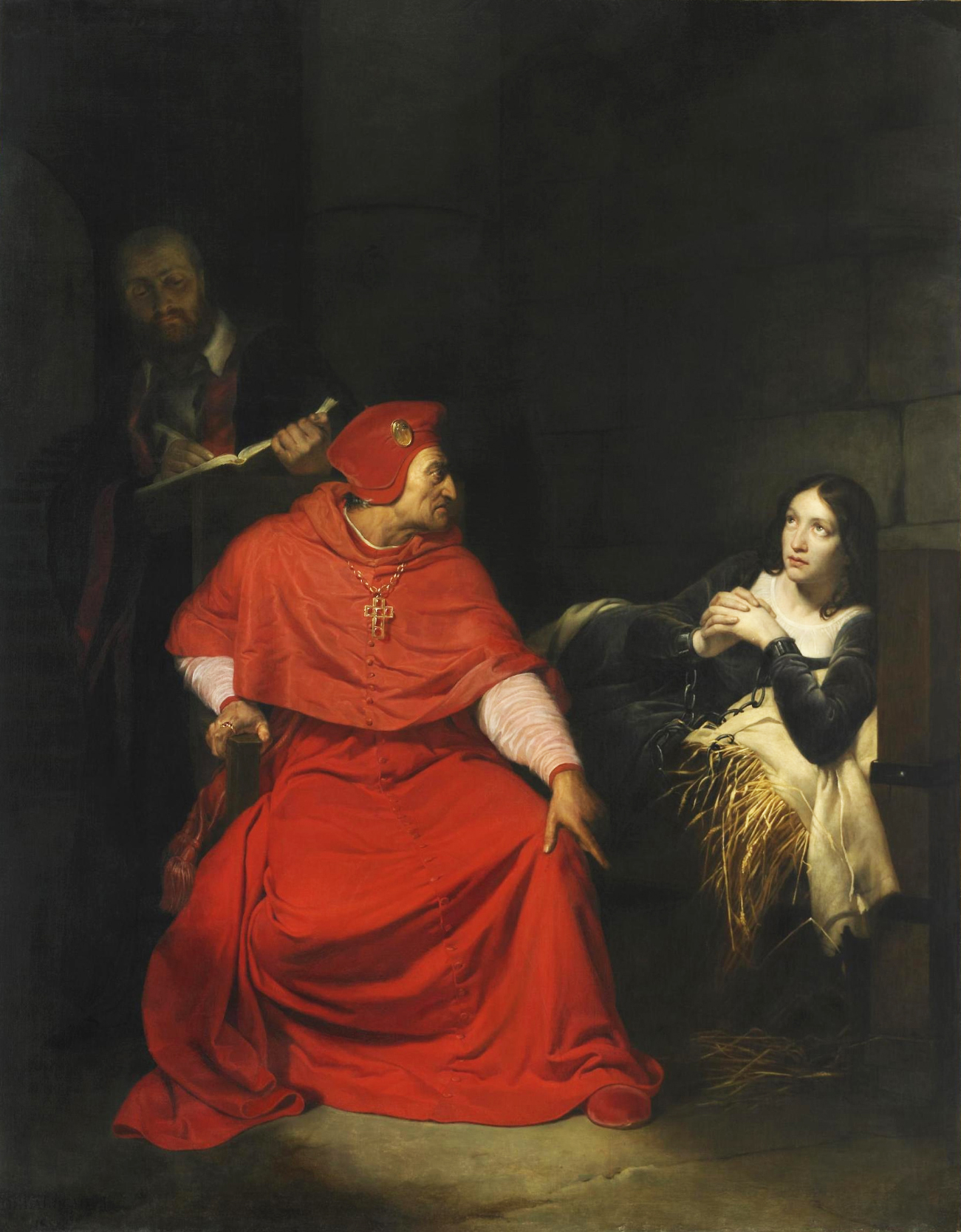
Paul Delaroche, Joan of Arc is interrogated (1824), Musée des Beaux-Arts de Rouen
