= Musidora and Her Two Companions =

Painting by Benjamin West

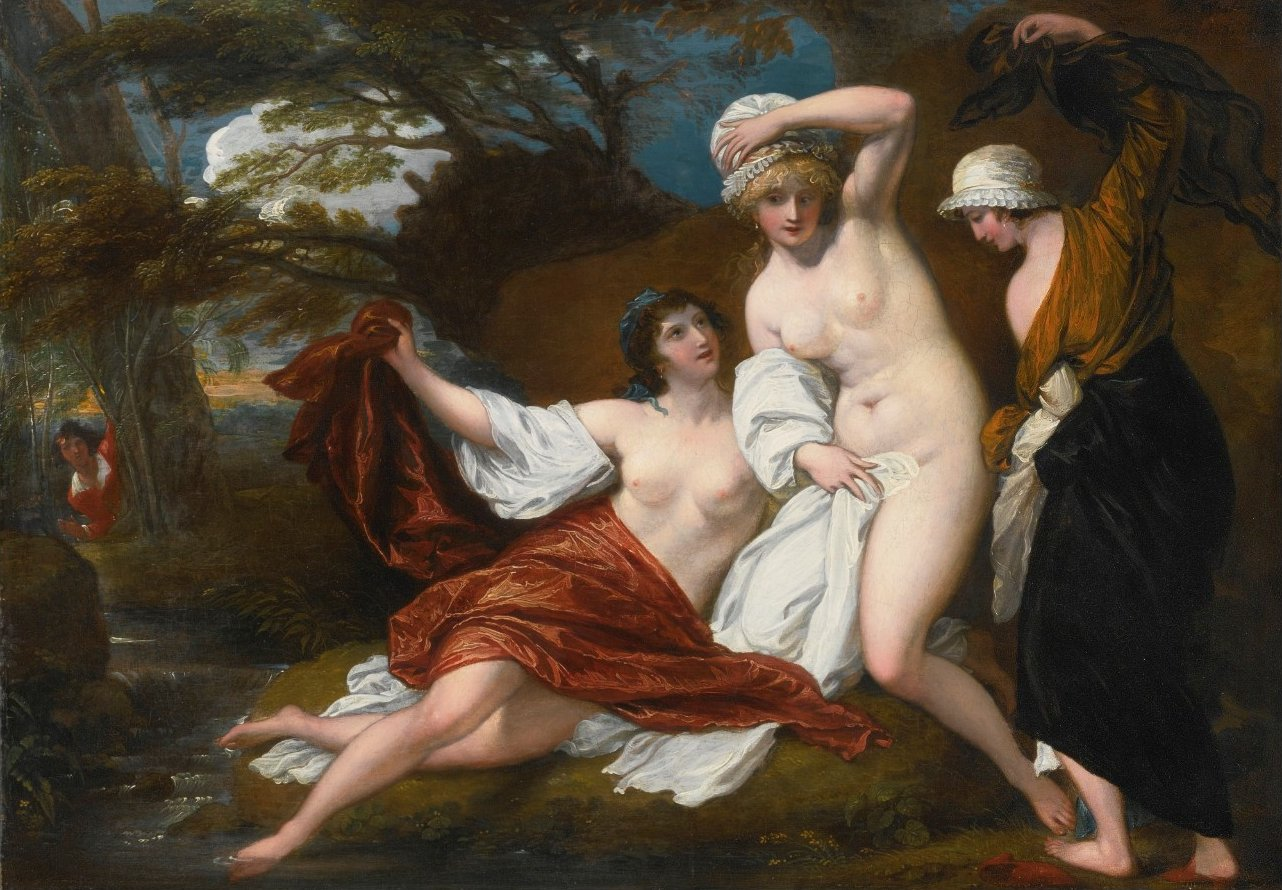
- Artist: Benjamin West
- Year: 1795
- Type: Oil on canvas, history painting
- Dimensions: 52.1 cm × 72.4 cm (20.5 in × 28.5 in)
- Location: Private collection

Musidora and Her Two Companions is a 1795 oil painting by the Anglo-American artist Benjamin West. It depicts a nude scene inspired by James Thomson's 1727 poem Summer, part of his larger work The Seasons. Musidora and her companions Sacharissa and Amoret are surprised while bathing in a stream by the watching Damon. The subject was a popular one in British art, with works by Thomas Gainsborough and William Etty amongst others.

It is likely that it was displayed at the Royal Academy's Summer Exhibition of 1795 at Somerset House under the title Nymphs Bathing. In 2015 it was auctioned at Sotheby's.

== Bibliography ==
- Alberts, Robert C. Benjamin West: A Biography. Houghton Mifflin, 1978.
- Clubbe, John. Byron, Sully, and the Power of Portraiture. Taylor and Francis, 2017.
- Dillenberger, John. Benjamin West. Trinity University Press, 1977
- Grossman, Lloyd. Benjamin West and the Struggle to be Modern. Merrell Publishers, 2015.
- Robinson, Leonads. William Etty: The Life and Art. McFarland, 2007.
