= The Frankland Sisters =

Painting by John Hoppner

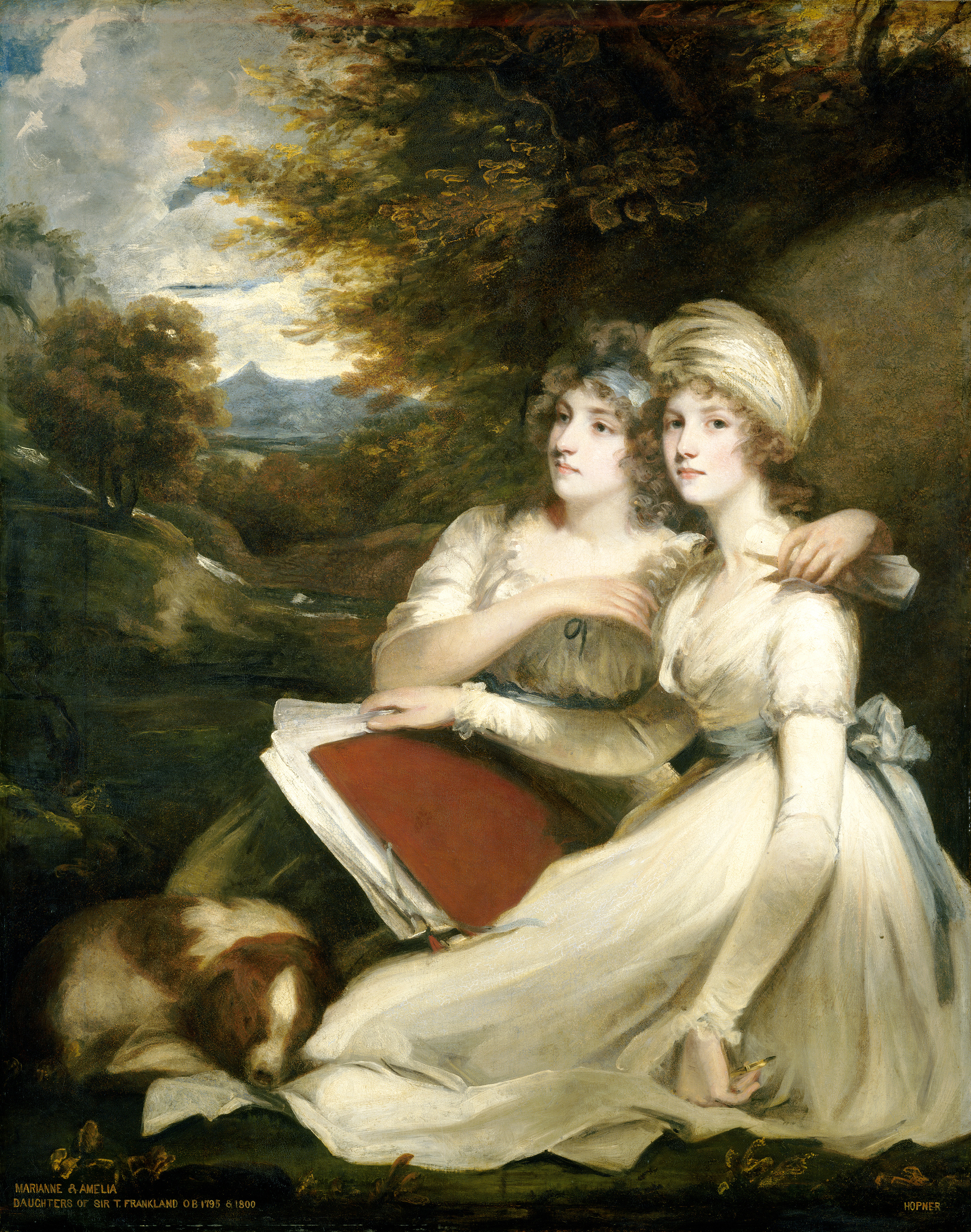
- Artist: John Hoppner
- Year: 1795
- Type: Oil on canvas, portrait painting
- Dimensions: 155 cm × 125 cm (61 in × 49 in)
- Location: National Gallery of Art, Washington D.C.

The Frankland Sisters is an oil painting on canvas by the British artist John Hoppner, from 1795. It is a double portrait of Amelia and Marianne, the two daughters of the Yorkshire landowner and politician Sir Thomas Frankland.

The two sisters are depicted in the countryside. They are both seated in the ground, with one of them carrying a large book of sketches. She looks directly to the viewer, unlike her sister, who embraces her. A small, quiet dog, sleeps at their feet. The scene opens to a majestic landscape in the background.

The painting was displayed at the Royal Academy Exhibition of 1795 held at Somerset House in London. It is now in the collection of the National Gallery of Art in Washington D.C. having been gifted by Andrew W. Mellon in 1937.

In 1797 a mezzotint based on the picture was produced by the engraver William Ward.

== Bibliography ==
- Gandolfo, Giampaolo. National Gallery, Washington. Hamlyn, 1969.
- Hayes, John T. British Paintings in the National Gallery of Art. Cambridge University Press, 1992.
