= Plundering the King's Cellar at Paris =

Painting by Johan Zoffany

- Artist: Johan Zoffany
- Year: 1794
- Type: Oil on canvas, history painting
- Dimensions: 103 cm × 126.5 cm (41 in × 49.8 in)
- Location: Wadsworth Atheneum, Hartford

Plundering the King's Cellar at Paris is an oil on canvas history painting by the German-born British artist Johan Zoffany, from 1794.

== History and description ==
It depicts a scene from the French Revolution from 10 August 1792 when the Tuileries Palace in Paris was stormed by armed revolutionaries. The revolutionaries of Paris are portrayed as a Hogarthian mob, having broken into the wine cellar of Louis XVI. Zoffany also produced another painting of the day's events Celebrating Over the Bodies of the Swiss Soldiers which shows the women of Paris dancing by the corpses of the Swiss Guards who had been killed in the fighting.

By the time the painting was produced Louis XVI had been guillotined and France had declared war on Britain which joined the First Coalition against the French Republic. Zoffany had only briefly visited Paris once in 1772 and his depiction of the Tuileries is largely imaginary. The painting was displayed at the Royal Academy's Summer Exhibition of 1795 at Somerset House in London. Richard Earlom produced a mezzotint based on the work in 1795, which was widely circulated. Today the painting is in the collection of the Wadsworth Atheneum in Connecticut.

== Bibliography ==
- Guest, Harriet. Unbounded Attachment: Sentiment and Politics in the Age of the French Revolution. OUP Oxford, 2013.
- Kornhauser, Elizabeth Mankin & Barringer, Tim. Thomas Cole's Journey: Atlantic Crossings. Metropolitan Museum of Art, 2018.
- Pressly, William L. The French Revolution as Blasphemy: Johan Zoffany's Paintings of the Massacre at Paris, August 10, 1792. University of California Press, 2023.
- Treadwell, Penelope. Johan Zoffany: Artist and Adventurer. Paul Holberton, 2009.
- Webster, Mary. Johan Zoffany, 1733-1810. National Portrait Gallery, 1976.
