= Jean-Baptiste Isabey and His Daughter =

Painting by François Gérard

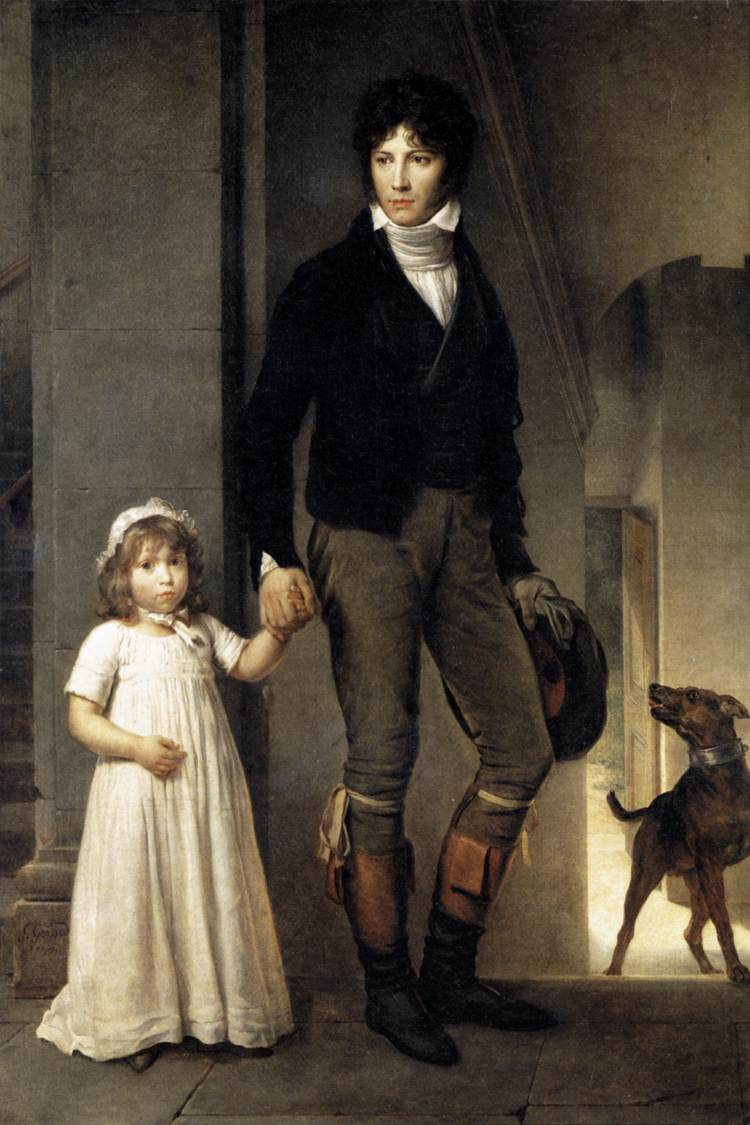
- Artist: François Gérard
- Year: 1795
- Type: Oil on canvas, portrait painting
- Dimensions: 194.5 cm × 130 cm (76.6 in × 51 in)
- Location: Louvre, Paris

Jean-Baptiste Isabey and His Daughter is a 1795 portrait painting by the French artist François Gérard. It depicts his fellow painter Jean-Baptiste Isabey, accompanied by his four-year-old daughter Alexandrine and a pet dog, on the Henry IV staircase at the Louvre in Paris Isabey was a celebrated painter of miniatures.

Gérard was a pupil of Jacques-Louis David, and became a leading portraitist during the Napoleonic and Restoration eras and the President of the Royal Académie. The painting was exhibited at the Salon of 1796 at the Louvre. Today it forms part of the collection of the Louvre, having been acquired in 1852.

== Bibliography ==
- Crow, Thomas. Emulation; Making Artists for Revolutionary France. Yale University Press, 1995.
