= Stephen Poyntz Denning =

English painter

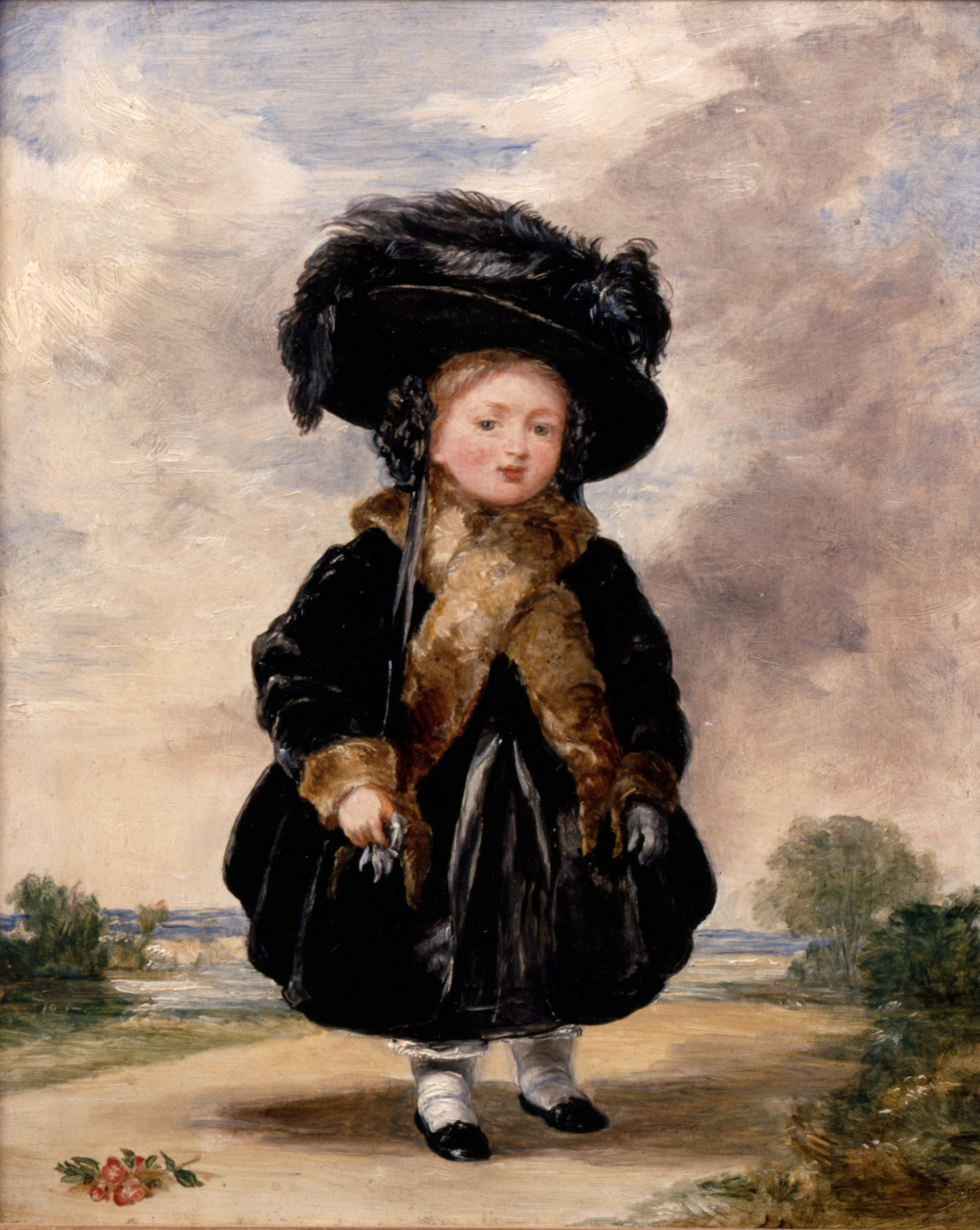
Princess Alexandrina Victoria aged four, portrait by Denning, 1823

Stephen Poyntz Denning (1795 – 8 June 1864) was an English portrait painter and gallery curator. He studied drawing and painting under John Masey Wright, working from Wright's address from 1814 to 1817, before exhibiting oil and watercolour miniature portraits at the Royal Academy between 1814 and 1852, as well as a small number of oil genre scenes in 1844 at the British Institution. In 1821 he became Curator of the Dulwich Picture Gallery, a post he held until his death. He died at Dulwich and was buried on 10 June 1864 at West Norwood Cemetery.
