= Royal Academy Exhibition of 1795 =

1795 art exhibition in London

Plundering of the King's Cellar at Paris by Johan Zoffany

The Royal Academy Exhibition of 1795 was the twenty seventh annual exhibition held by the British Royal Academy of Arts It was held at Somerset House in London from 4 May to 13 June, attracting over 40,000 visitors. It featured many of the leading painters, sculptors and architects of the later Georgian era.

Britain and the French Republic were fighting in the French Revolutionary Wars and the artworks displayed reflected this. These included paintings depicting the naval victory at the Glorious First of June. Johann Zoffany featured the anti-revolutionary scenes the Plundering the King's Cellar at Paris.The Anglo-American President of the Royal Academy Benjamin West showed several history paintings including The Treaty of Allahabad, which he was to exhibit again later in his career. He also displayed the genre painting Gentlemen Fishing featuring himself and friends on the River Thames east of Greenwich.

The young portraitist Thomas Lawrence again drew critical and public interest for his works, with his Portrait of Lord Mountstuart being widely discussed. In addition Pinkie, which became one of his best-known paintings, featured at the exhibition. Another younger artist Richard Westall attracted attention for his watercolour paintings as did J.M.W. Turner who featured scenes from around Britain including Tintern Abbey.

== Gallery ==
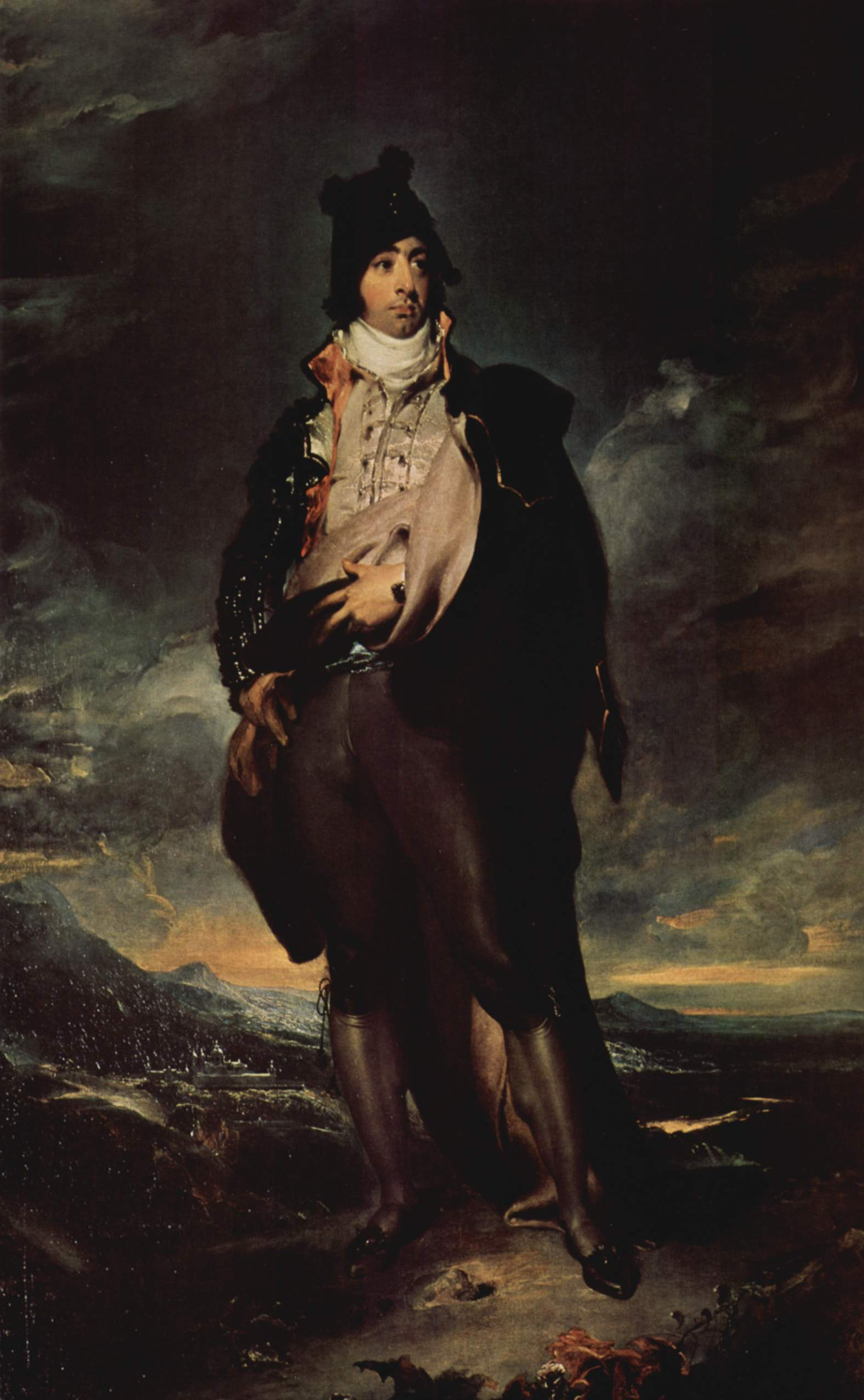
Portrait of Lord Mountstuart by Thomas Lawrence

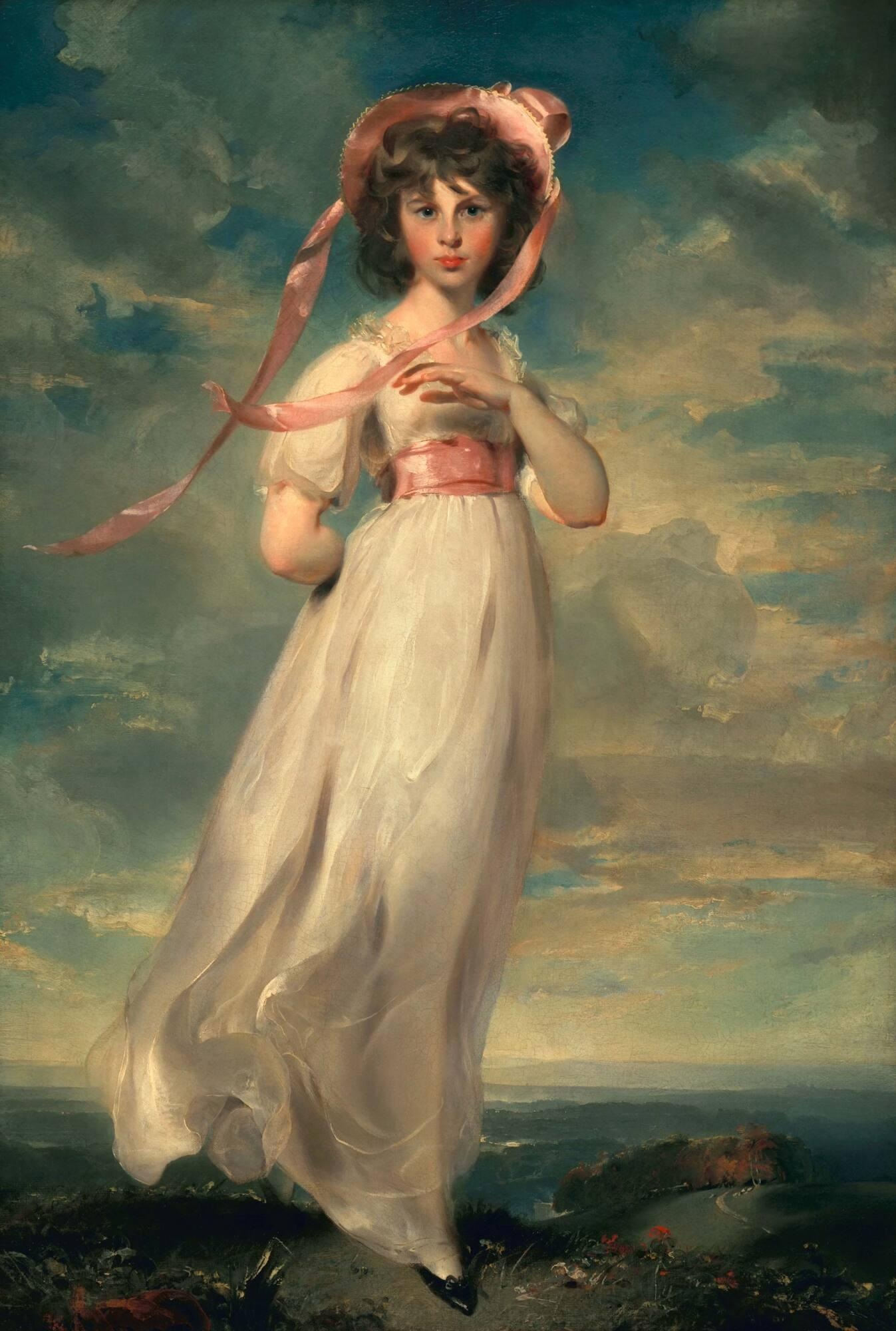
Pinkie by Thomas Lawrence

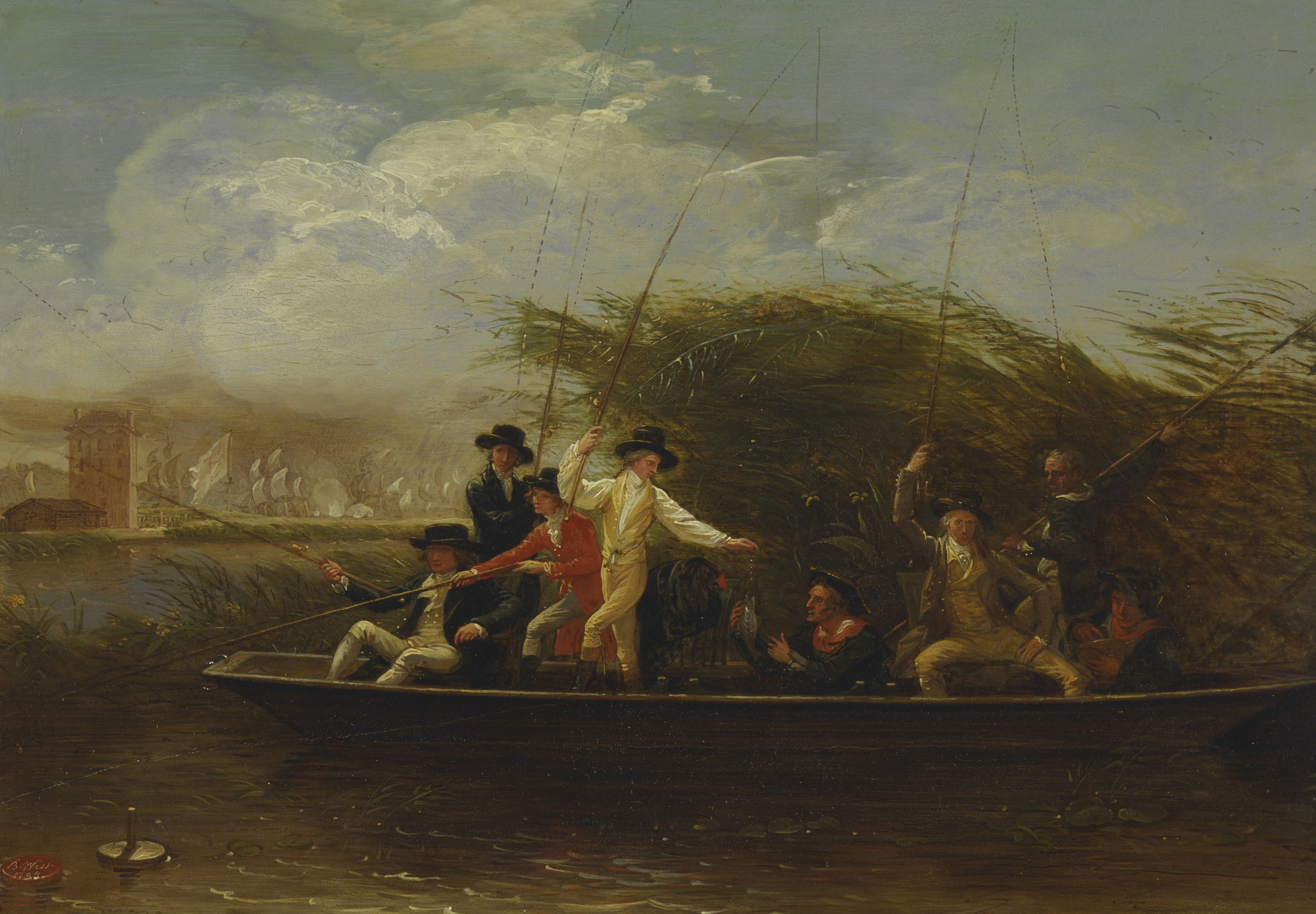
Gentlemen Fishing by Benjamin West

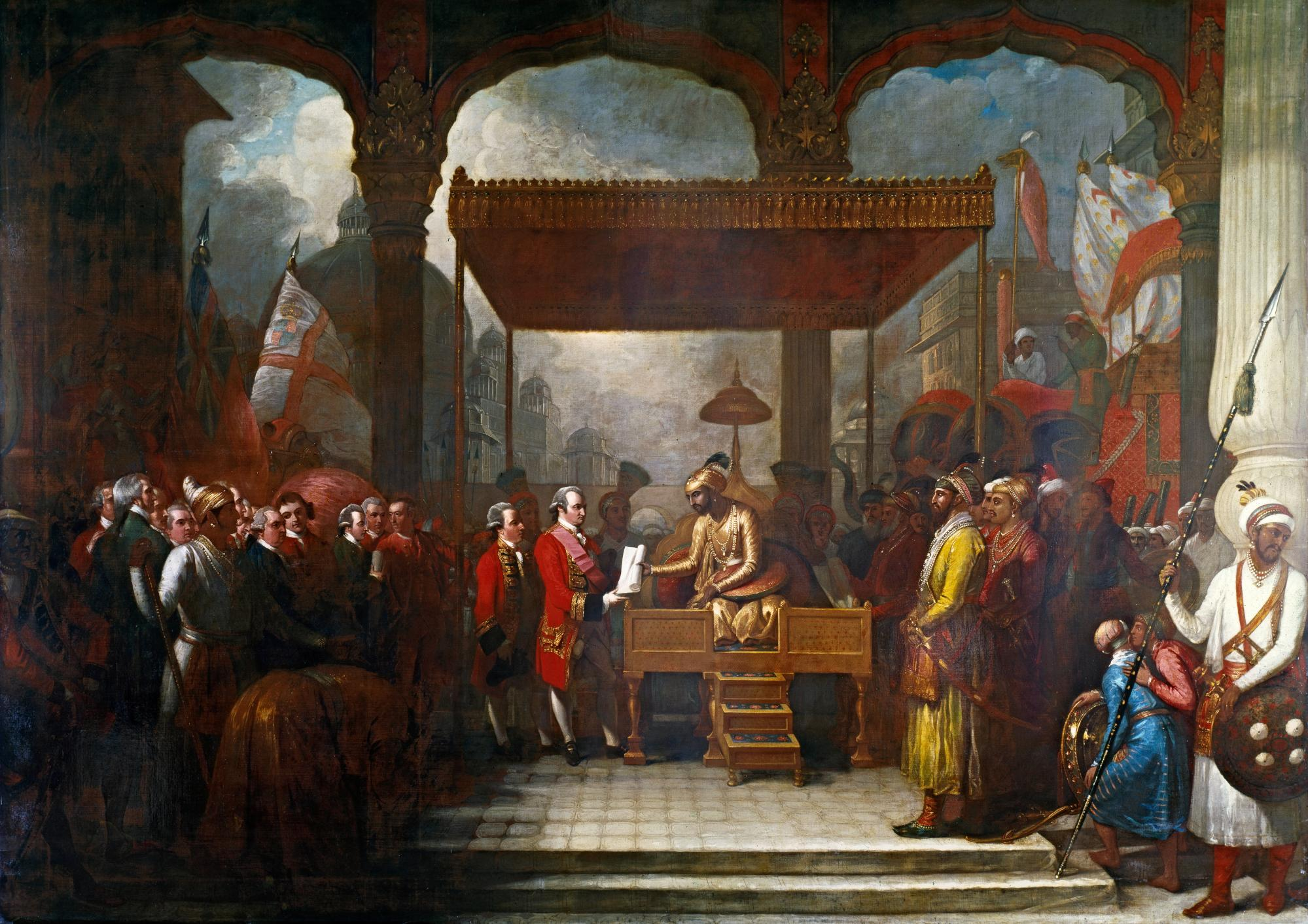
The Treaty of Allahabad by Benjamin West

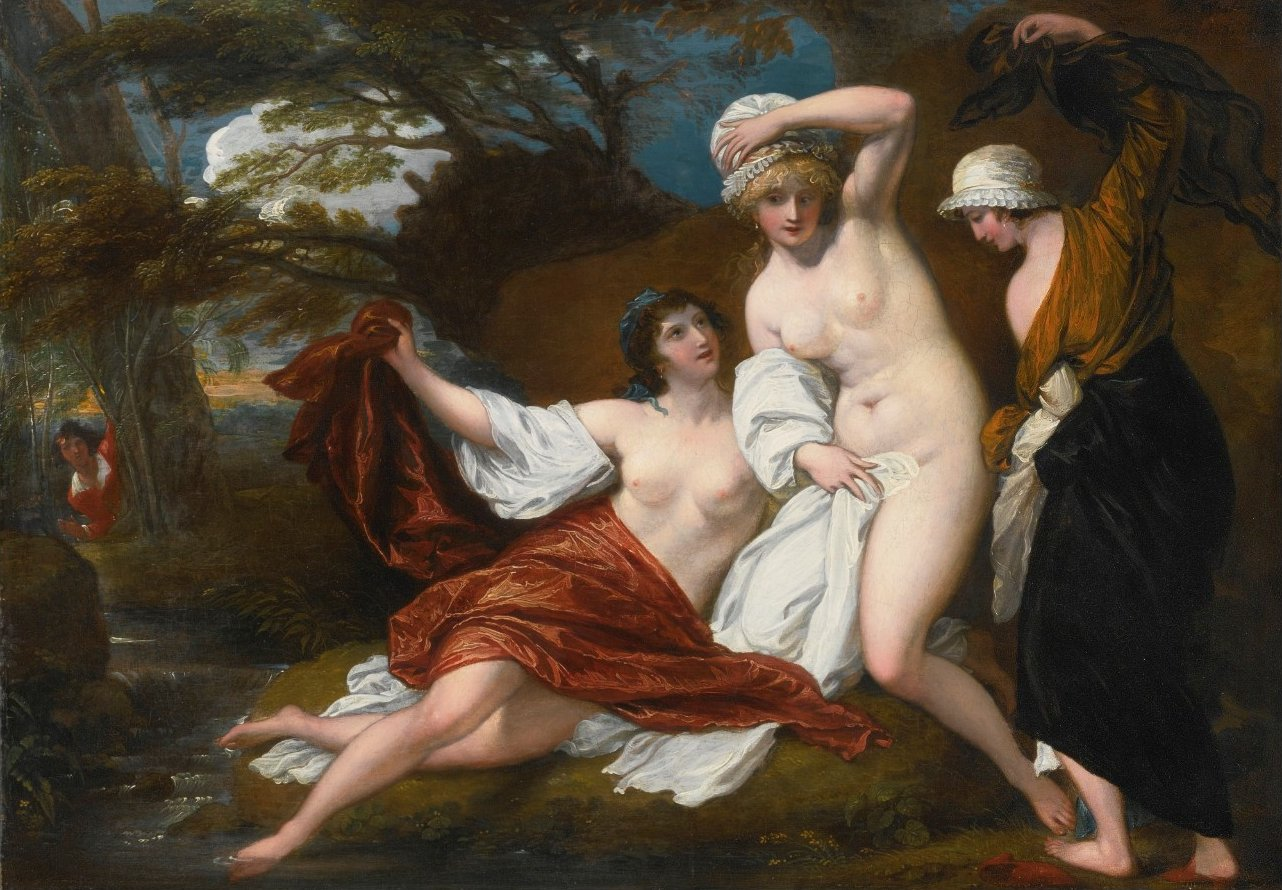
Musidora and Her Two Companions by Benjamin West

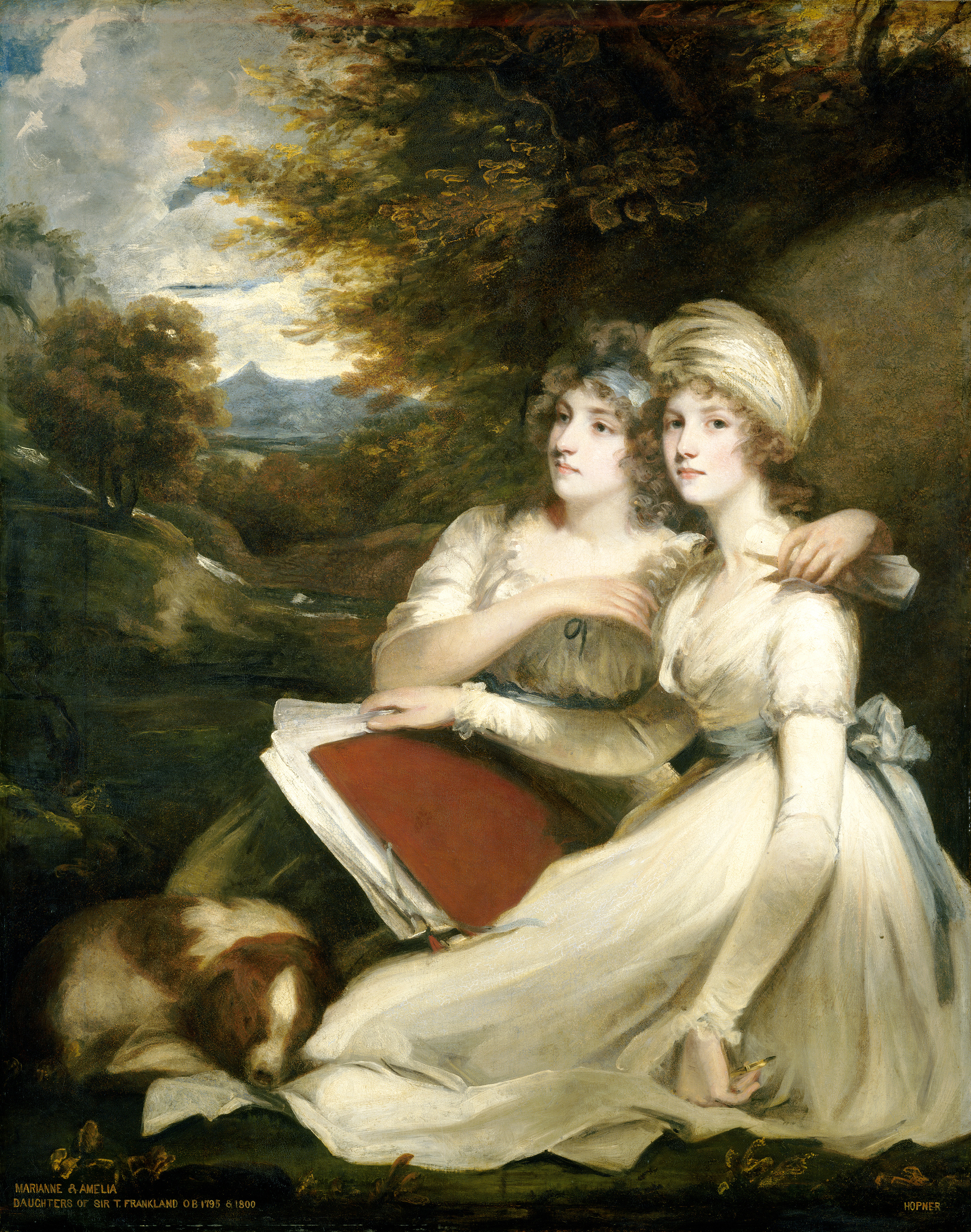
The Frankland Sisters by John Hoppner, 1795

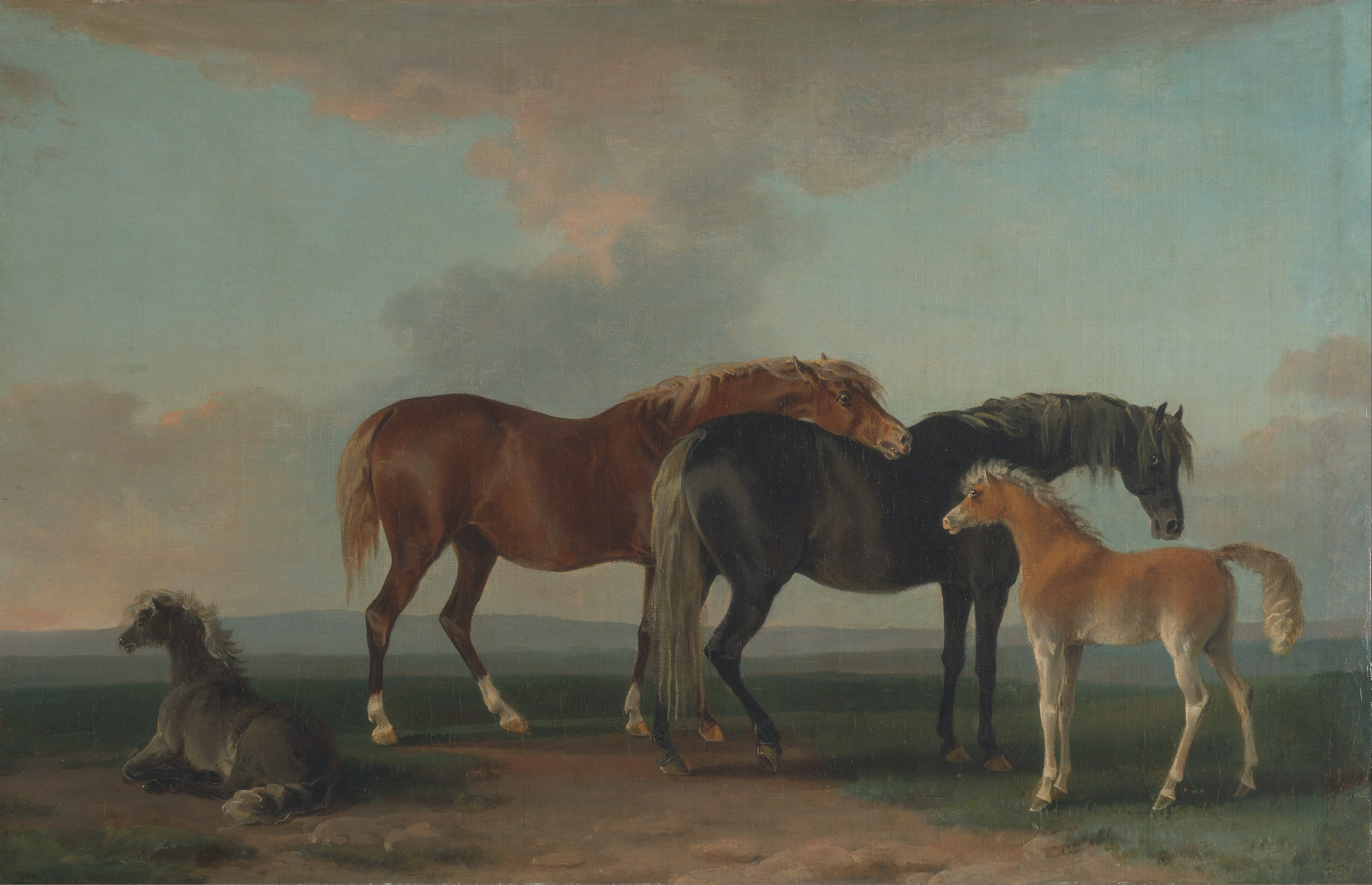
Mares and Foals by Sawrey Gilpin

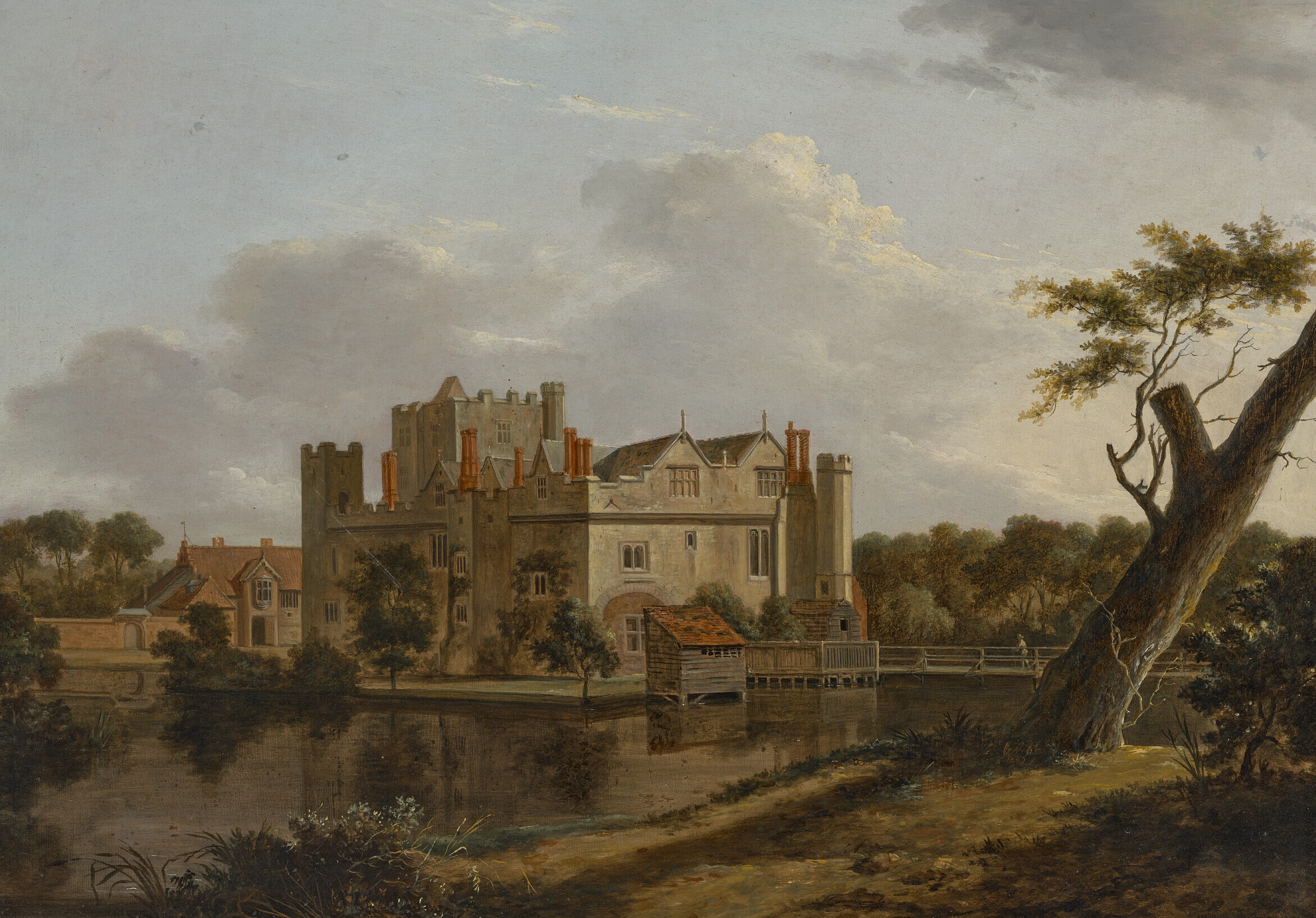
A View of Hever Castle by Hendrik Frans de Cort

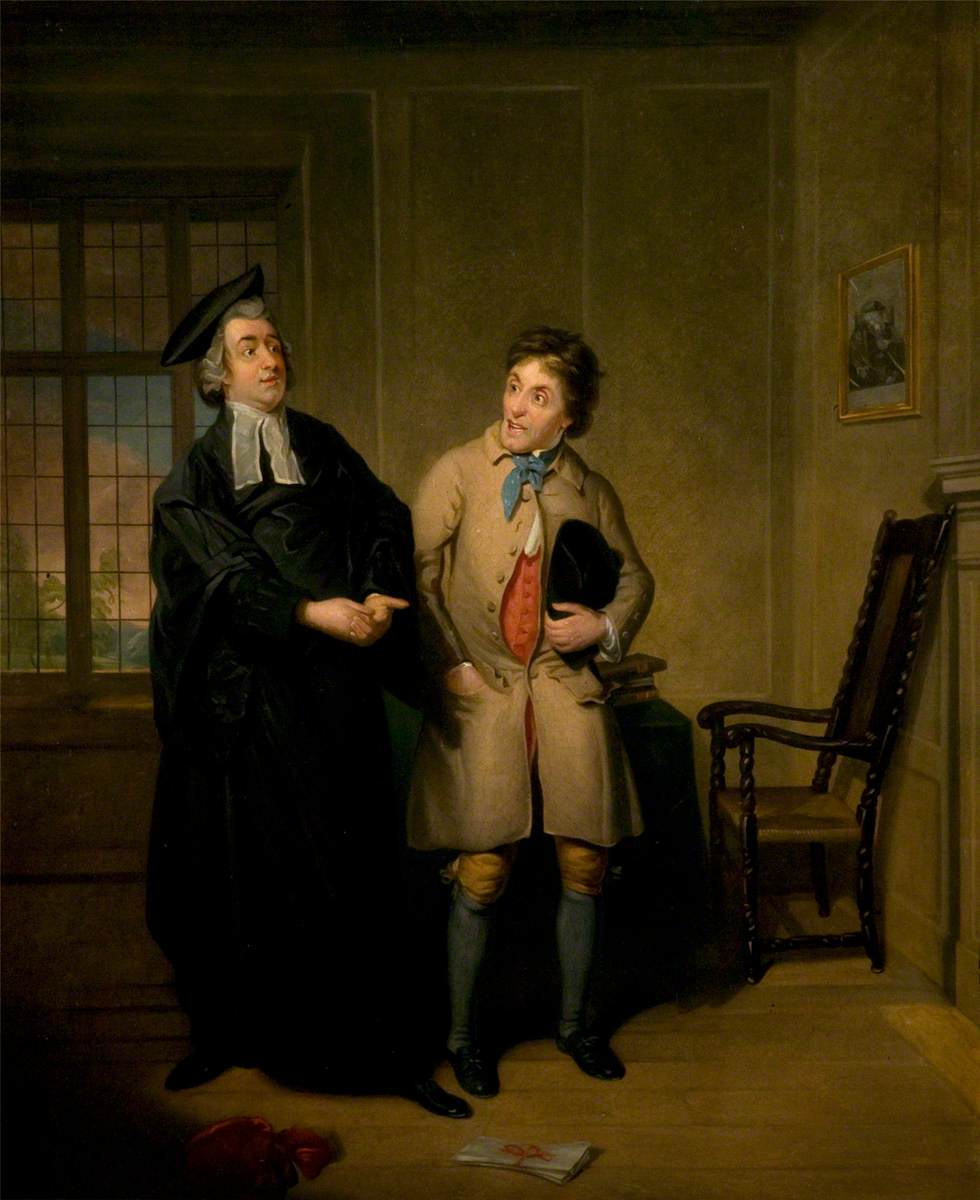
Scene from The Village Lawyer by Samuel de Wilde

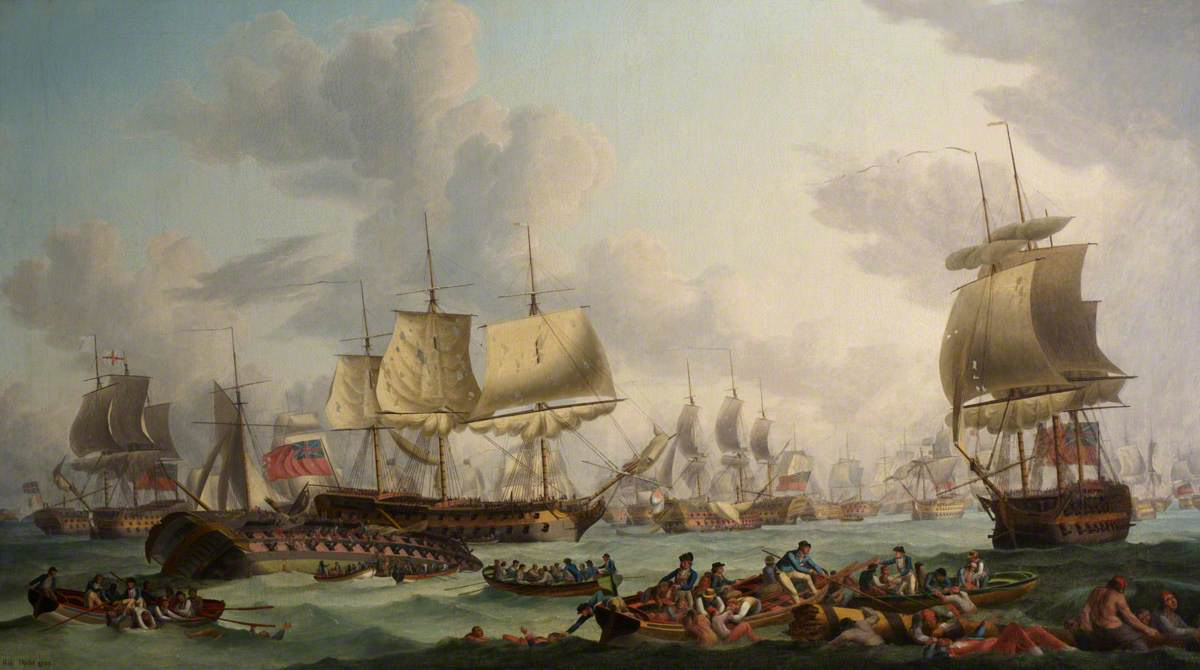
The Battle of the First of June by Robert Dodd

Old Welsh Bridge, Shrewsbury by J. M. W. Turner

Marford Mill by J. M. W. Turner

Cathedral Church at Lincoln by J. M. W. Turner

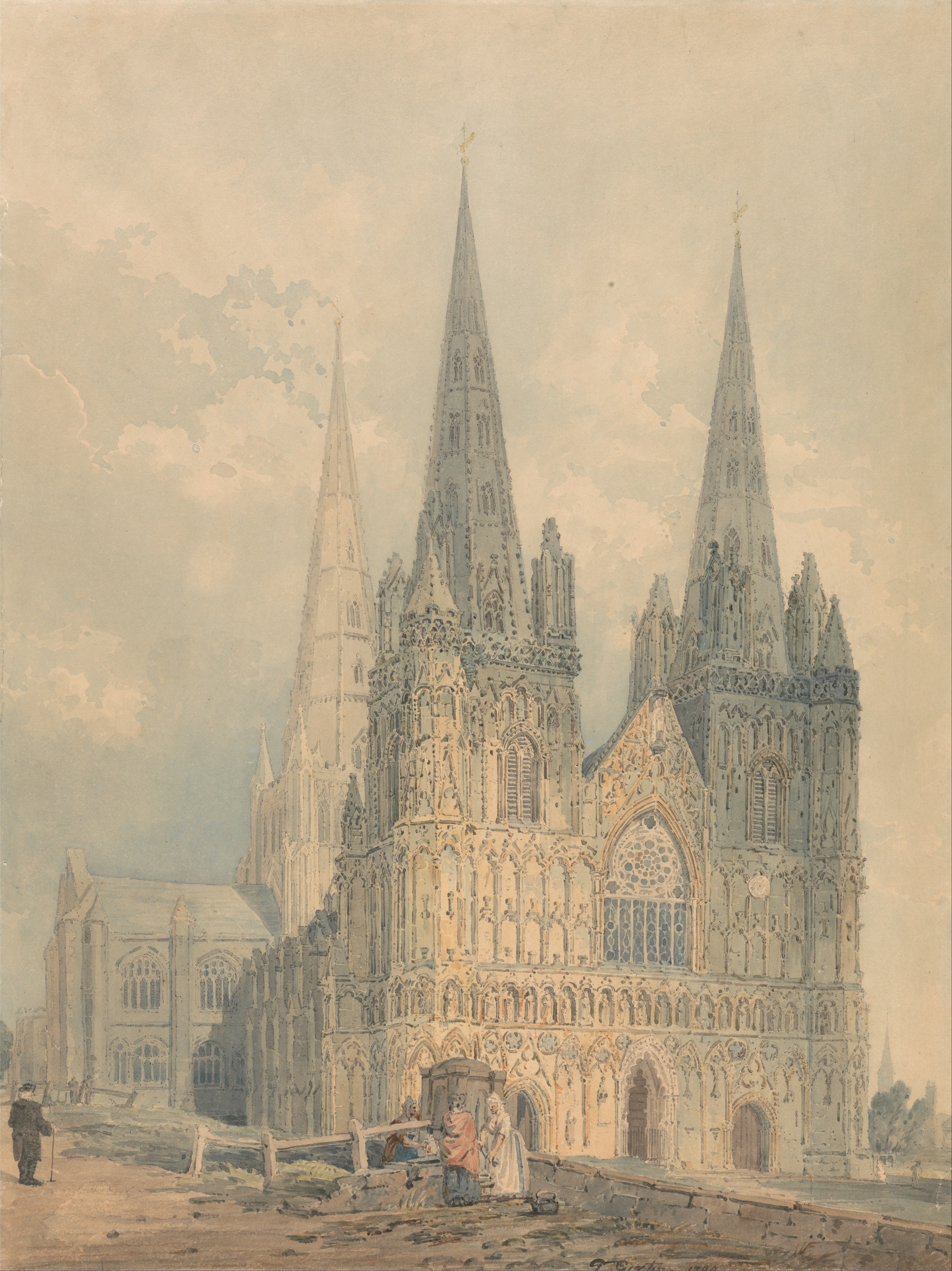
Lichfield Cathedral by Thomas Girtin

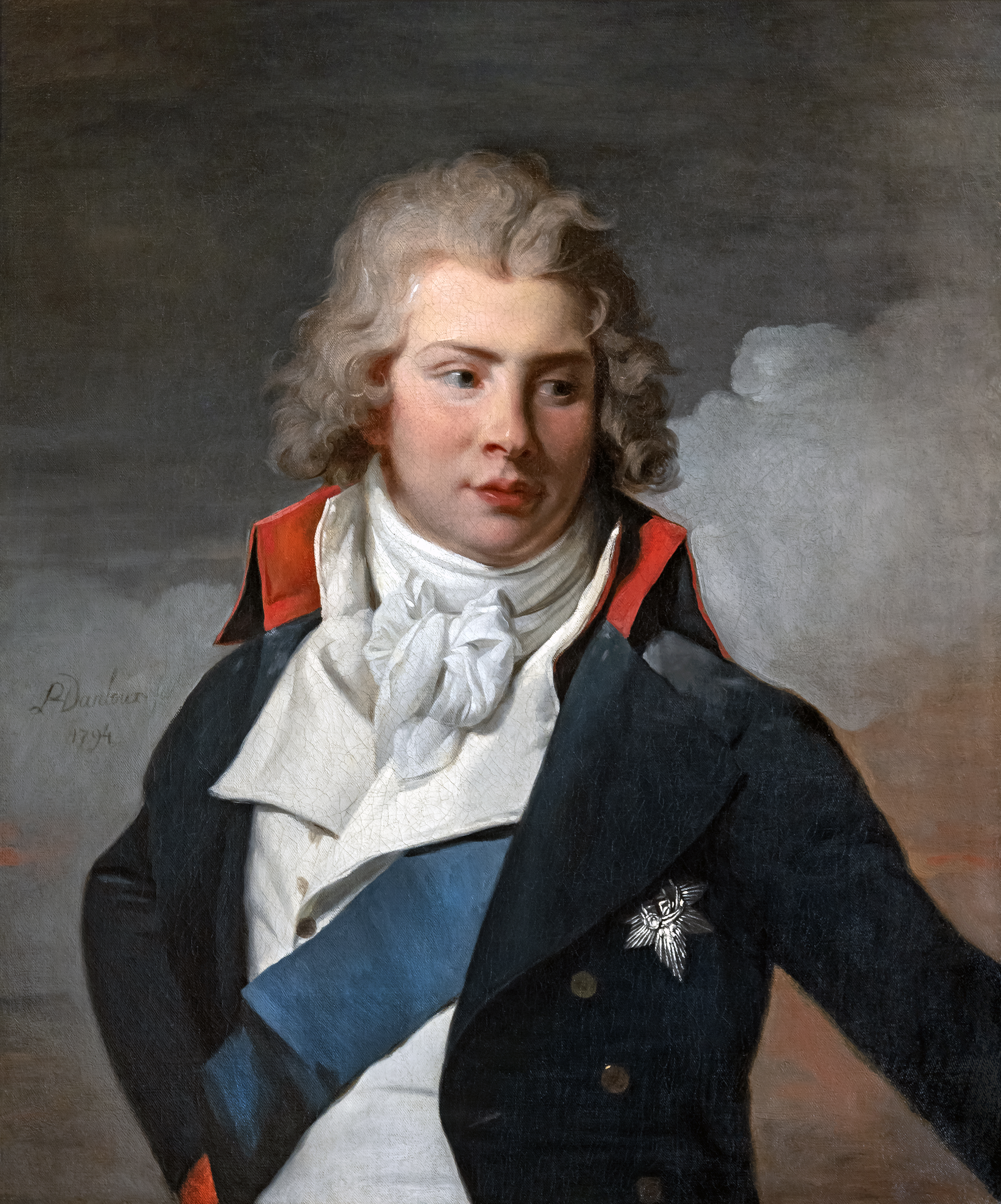
Portrait of Prince Augustus by Henri-Pierre Danloux

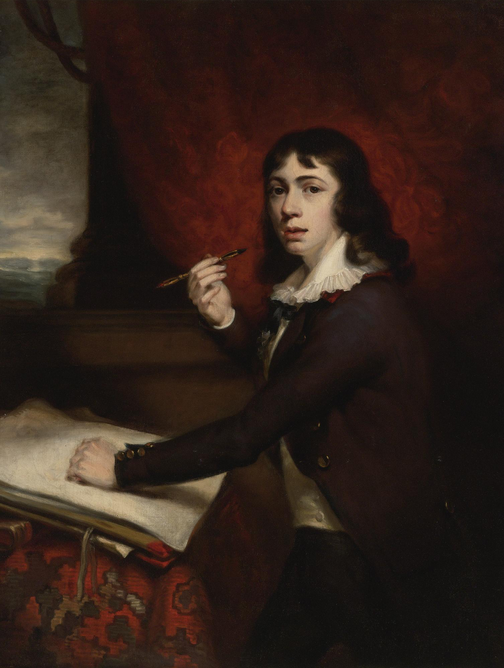
Self-portrait by John James Masquerier

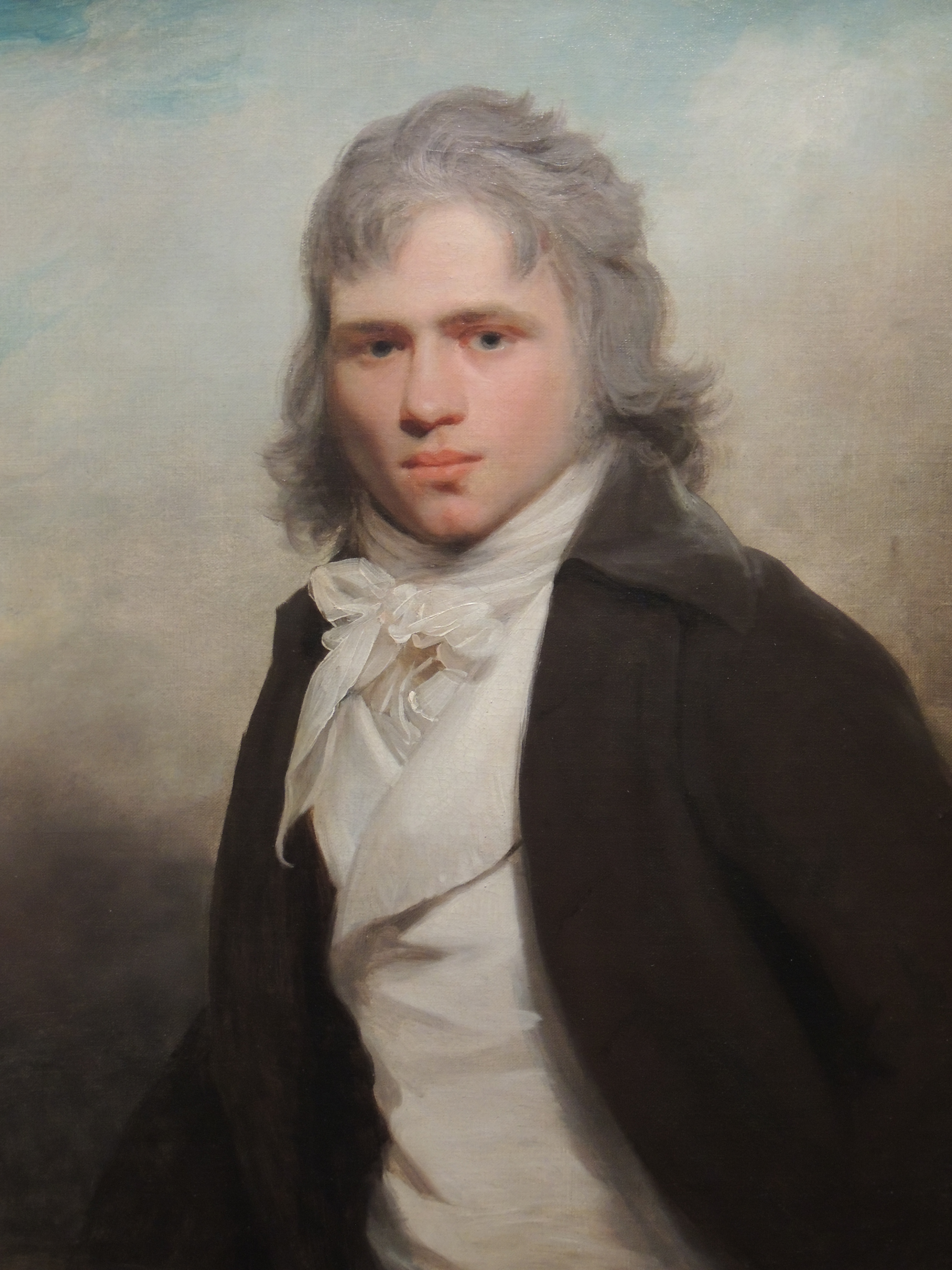
Portrait of Thomas Law Hodges by William Beechey

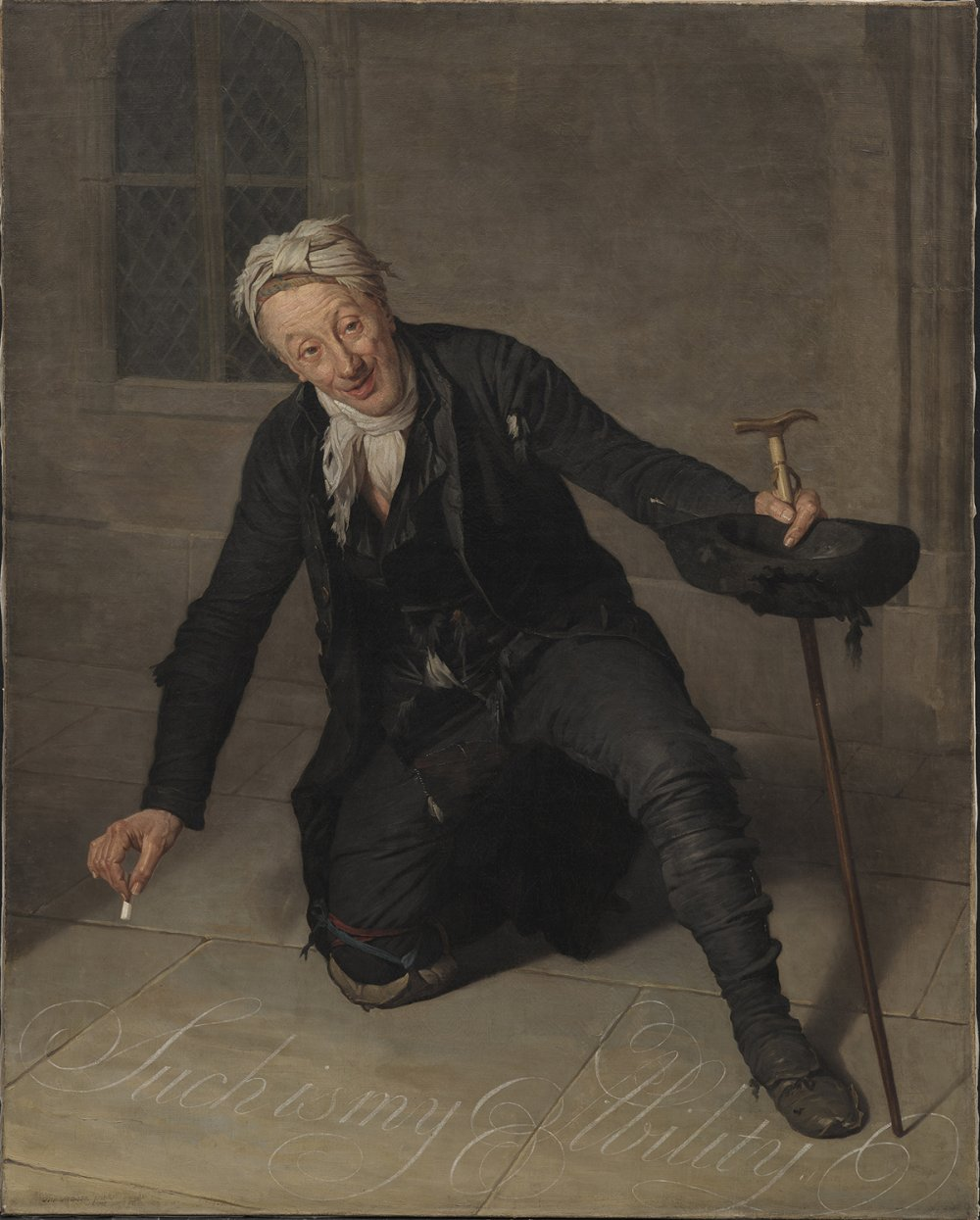
Whitfield, the Writer on the Pavement by Féréol Bonnemaison

== Bibliography ==
- Bailey, Anthony. J.M.W. Turner: Standing in the Sun. Tate Enterprises, 2013.
- Levey, Michael. Sir Thomas Lawrence. Yale University Press, 2005.
- Pressly, William L. The French Revolution as Blasphemy: Johan Zoffany's Paintings of the Massacre at Paris, August 10, 1792. University of California Press, 2023.
- Wark, Robert R. The Revolution in Eighteenth-century Art: Ten British Pictures, 1740-1840. Huntington Library, 2001.
