= Gentlemen Fishing =

1794 painting by Benjamin West

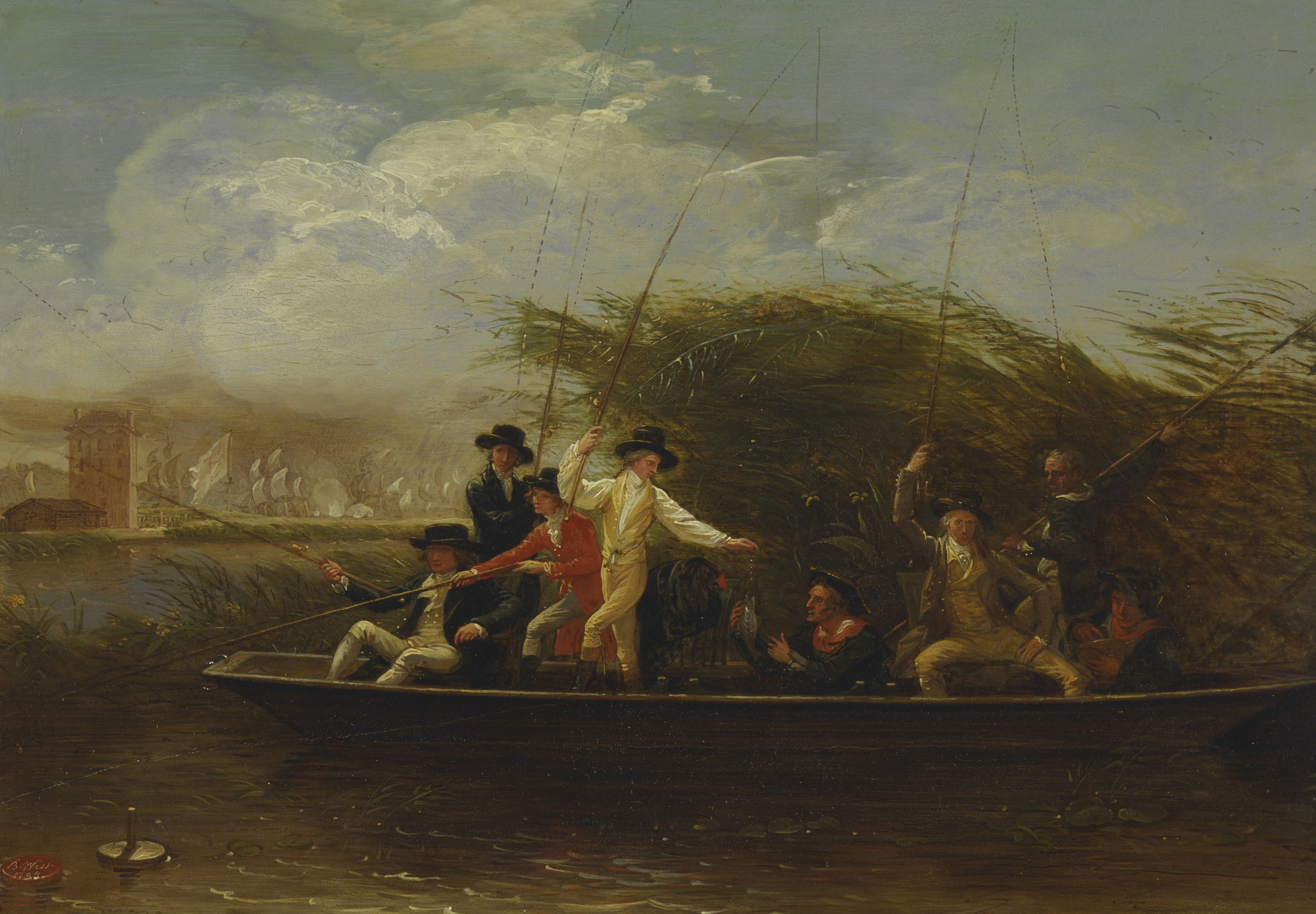
- Artist: Benjamin West
- Year: 1794
- Type: Oil on slate, genre painting
- Dimensions: 30.8 cm × 43.2 cm (12.1 in × 17.0 in)
- Location: Yale Center for British Art, New Haven

Gentlemen Fishing is a 1794 genre painting by the American-born British artist Benjamin West. It features a group of men fishing at Dagenham Breach a lake on the River Thames a few miles east of Greenwich. Amongst the men portrayed on the expedition are West himself, the elegantly-dressed figure in the centre shown handing a fish to a servant, and his friend Sir Hugh Palliser, 1st Baronet, who is shown third from right. In the background maritime traffic on the Thames can be seen.

West had succeeded Joshua Reynolds as President of the Royal Academy in 1792 and was best known for his history paintings. The work was displayed at the Royal Academy's Summer Exhibition of 1795 at Somerset House. Today the painting is in the Yale Center for British Art in Connecticut as part of the Paul Mellon Collection.

== Bibliography ==
- Alberts, Robert C. Benjamin West: A Biography. Houghton Mifflin, 1978.
- Grossman, Lloyd. Benjamin West and the Struggle to be Modern. Merrell Publishers, 2015.
- Warner, Malcolm. Paul Mellon Bequest: Treasures of a Lifetime, Yale Center for British Art. Yale Center for British Art, 2001.
