= 1865 in art =

Events from the year 1865 in art.

== Events ==
- February–April – Alexander Gardner photographs Abraham Lincoln (before and after his death) and his assassins.
- July 21 – Charles Dodgson (Lewis Carroll) photographs Effie Gray Millais, John Everett Millais, and their daughters Effie and Mary at 7 Cromwell Place, London.
- Ford Madox Brown completes his painting Work after thirteen years.
- Morris, Marshall, Faulkner & Co. install the stained-glass east window in the chapel of St Edmund Hall, Oxford, England, designed by Edward Burne-Jones, William Morris and Philip Webb.
- Édouard Manet's painting Olympia is first exhibited, at the Salon (Paris), and causes controversy.
- Jean-François Millet's painting The Angelus (L'Angélus) is first exhibited and becomes very popular in France.
- The Bargello in Florence becomes an art museum.

== Works ==
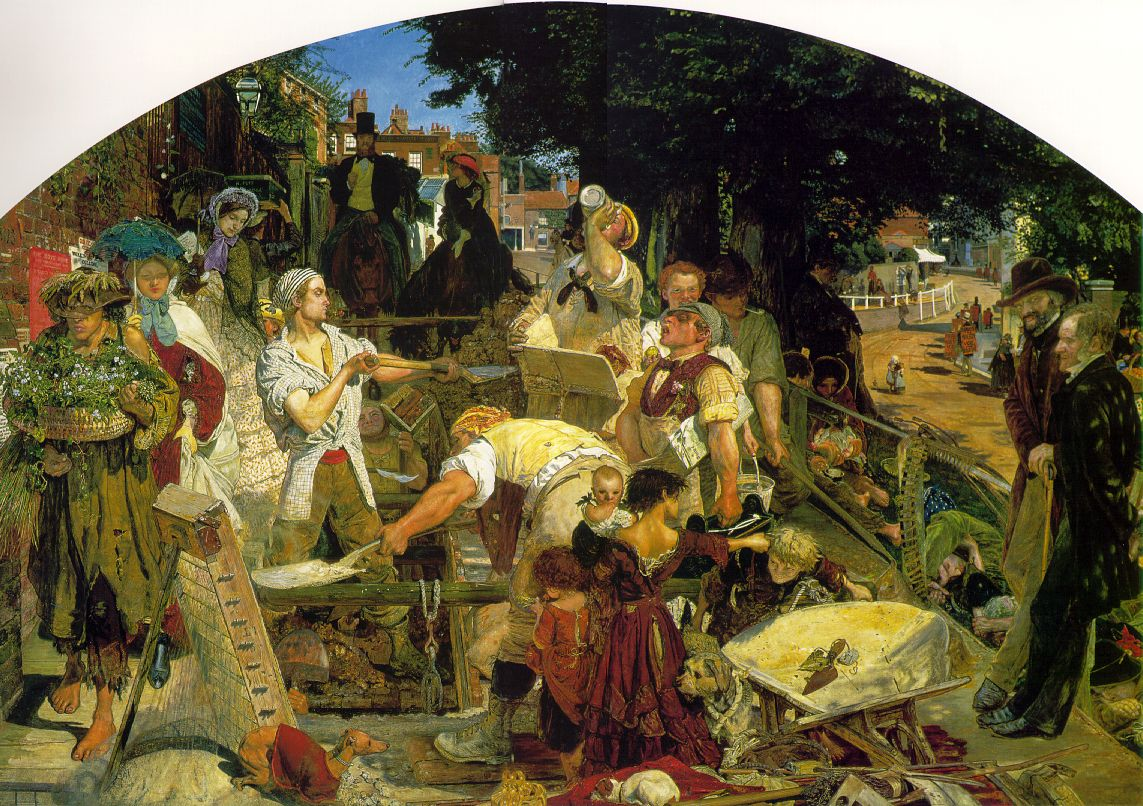
Ford Madox Brown – Work

- Lawrence Alma-Tadema – An Egyptian at his Doorway
- Edward Armitage – The Festival of Esther
- John Ballantyne – Sir Edwin Landseer in His Studio
- Thomas Jones Barker – The Studio of Salvator Rosa in the Mountains of the Abruzzi
- Albert Bierstadt
  - Looking Down Yosemite Valley, California
  - Staubbach Falls, near Lauterbrunnen, Switzerland
- Ford Madox Brown – Work
- Constantino Brumidi – The Apotheosis of Washington (fresco in United States Capitol rotunda)
- Augustus Burke – Connemara Girl
- Edward Burne-Jones and William Morris – The Crucifixion (stained-glass window for chapel of St Edmund Hall, Oxford)
- Philip Hermogenes Calderon – Her Most High, Noble and Puissant Grace
- Frederic Edwin Church – Aurora Borealis
- Jean-Baptiste-Camille Corot – Ville d'Avray
- Gustave Courbet
  - Proudhon and His Children
  - Portrait of Countess Karoly
  - Le ruisseau noir
- Honoré Daumier – The Third-Class Carriage (National Gallery of Canada, Ottawa)
- Edgar Degas – Medieval War Scene, his first painting exhibited at the Salon (Paris)
- Thomas Faed – The Last of the Clan
- William Powell Frith
  - The Marriage of the Prince of Wales
  - Portrait of Mary Elizabeth Braddon
  - Uncle Toby and the Widow Wadman
- Jean-Léon Gérôme – Prayer
- Henri Harpignies – Les Corbeaux
- Henry Holiday – Stained glass windows for chapel of Worcester College, Oxford
- Winslow Homer – The Veteran in a New Field
- John Callcott Horsley – A Pleasant Corner
- Elisabeth Jerichau-Baumann – A Wounded Danish Soldier
- Edwin Landseer
  - The Connoisseurs
  - Lady Godiva's Prayer
- Andrew and George Anderson Lawson – Wellington's Column, Liverpool
- Benjamin Williams Leader – Autumn's Last Gleam
- Edward Lear – Jerusalem (Ashmolean Museum, Oxford)
- Thomas Le Clear – Interior with Portraits

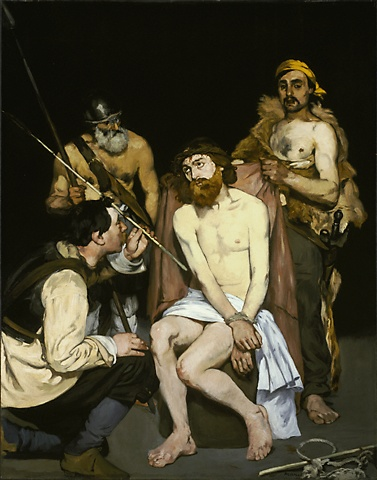
Édouard Manet – The Mocking of Christ

- Édouard Manet
  - Angélina (Musée d'Orsay, Paris)
  - Bull-Fighting Scene (Private collection)
  - The Mocking of Christ (Art Institute of Chicago)
  - The Tragic Actor (Rouvière as Hamlet) (National Gallery of Art, Washington, D.C.)
- George Hemming Mason – The Cast Shoe
- Adolph Menzel – The Coronation of King William I in Königsberg 1861
- John Everett Millais
  - Esther
  - Joan of Arc
  - Waking
- Aimé Millet – Vercingétorix monument
- Henry Moore – The Rainbow
- Gustave Moreau – Thracian Girl Carrying the Head of Orpheus on His Lyre
- John Phillip – The Early Career of Murillo
- Edward Poynter – Faithful Unto Death
- Val Prinsep – The Lady of the Tooti-Nameh or The legend of the parrot
- Illarion Pryanishnikov – Jokers: Gostiny Dvor in Moscow
- Dante Gabriel Rossetti – The Blue Bower
- Alfred Sisley – Avenue of Chestnut Trees near La Celle-Saint-Cloud
- John Tenniel – illustrations to Alice's Adventures in Wonderland
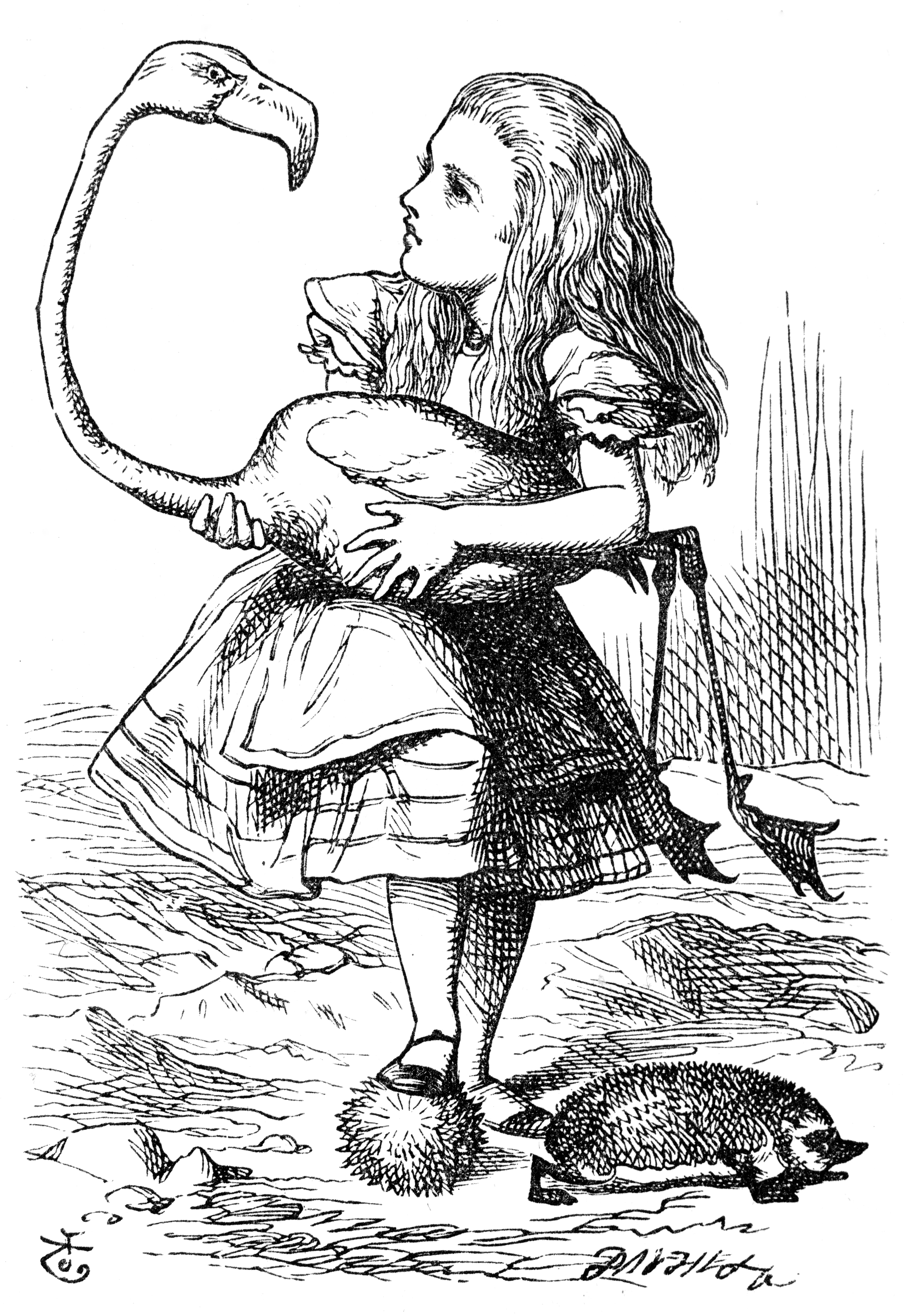
  Tenniel illustration to Alice's Adventures in Wonderland
- S. S. Teulon – Buxton Memorial Fountain (Westminster)
- James McNeill Whistler – Rose and Silver: The Princess from the Land of Porcelain
- Franz Xaver Winterhalter – Portrait of Franz Joseph I
- Thomas Woolner – Godley Statue

== Births ==
- January 19 – Valentin Serov, Russian portrait painter (died 1911)
- January 23 – Connie Gilchrist, English child actress and model (died 1946)
- April 26 – Akseli Gallen-Kallela, Finnish painter (died 1931)
- May 5 – Albert Aurier, French poet, art critic and painter, devoted to Symbolism (died 1892)
- June 25 – Robert Henri, American painter, leader of the Ash Can School (died 1929)
- June 26 – Bernard Berenson, Lithuanian-born American art historian (died 1959)
- June 28 – David Young Cameron, Scottish painter (died 1945)
- August 2 – John Radecki, Polish-born Australian stained glass artist (died 1955)
- August 20 – Frank DuMond, American painter, illustrator and teacher (died 1951)
- September 23 – Suzanne Valadon, French artists' model and painter (died 1938)
- November 11 – Donatus Buongiorno, Italian-born American painter (died 1935)
- December 28 – Félix Vallotton, Swiss painter and graphic artist (died 1925)
- date unknown – Adelaïde Alsop Robineau, American painter and potter (died 1929)

== Deaths ==
- January 10 – William Fox-Strangways, 4th Earl of Ilchester, English diplomat and art collector (born 1795)
- January 12 – Kunisada, Japanese designer of ukiyo-e woodblock prints (born 1786)
- January 19 – Clementina Maude, Viscountess Hawarden, British portrait photographer (born 1822)
- January 21 – Johan Erik Lindh, Swedish painter and former decorative painter who moved to Finland (born 1793)
- January 23 – Joseph-Désiré Court, French painter of historical subjects and portraits (born 1797)
- February 21 – Constant Troyon, French painter (born 1810)
- March 8 – Gerard Bilders, Dutch painter (born 1838)
- April 21 – Josef Matěj Navrátil, Czech painter of murals and frescoes (born 1798)
- April 28 – Robert William Sievier, English engraver, sculptor and inventor (born 1794)
- June 18 – Antoine Wiertz, Belgian painter (born 1806)
- July 11 – Ammi Phillips, American folk portrait painter (born 1788)
- August 14 – Fitz Henry Lane, American Luminist marine painter (born 1804)
- August 23 – Ferdinand Georg Waldmüller, Austrian painter and writer (born 1793)
- September 17 – John Neagle, American portrait painter (born 1796)
- September 23 – John Frederick Herring, Sr., English painter, signmaker and coachman in Victorian England (born 1795)
- September 29 – François Joseph Heim, French painter (born 1787)
- November 1 – Charles-François Lebœuf, French sculptor (born 1792)
- December 24 – Charles Lock Eastlake, English painter and art collector (born 1793)
- date unknown
  - Tivadar Alconiere, Hungarian painter (born 1797)
  - Michael Hanhart, English lithographer and chromolithographer (born 1788)
