= William Henry Simmons =

British printmaker

William Henry Simmons (11 June 1811 – 10 June 1882 London) was a British printmaker.

== Life ==
Simmons became a pupil of William Finden, the line engraver, but eventually he almost entirely abandoned that style of the art for mezzotinto, in which he attained a high degree of excellence.

Simmons died, after a short illness, at 247 Hampstead Road, London, on 10 June 1882, and was buried on the western side of Highgate Cemetery. His grave (plot no.5984) no longer has a headstone or readable memorial.

== Works ==
Several of his best-known plates are after pictures by Thomas Faed. After Edwin Landseer he engraved Rustic Beauty (the single figure of a girl from the Highland Whisky Still).

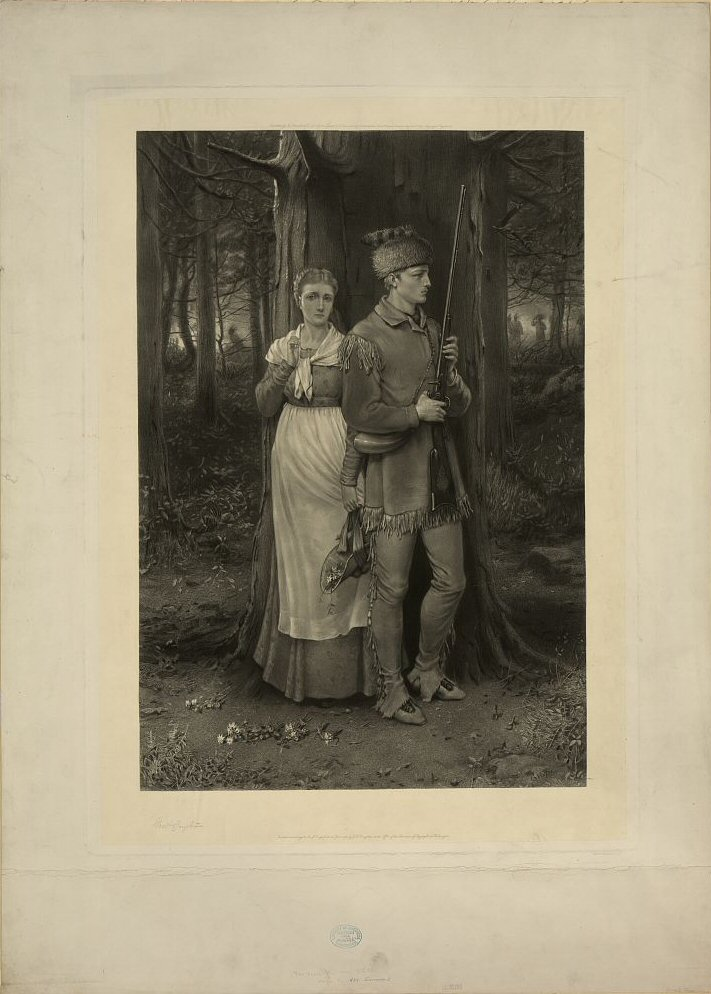
'Mixed method' engraving after George Henry Boughton - Too Near the War-Path

Other works by him are

- The Light of the World and Claudio and Isabella, after William Holman Hunt;
- The Proscribed Royalist, The Parable of the Lost Piece of Money, and Rosalind and Celia, after John Everett Millais;
- Broken Vows, after Philip H. Calderon;
- The Blind Beggar, after J. L. Dyckmans;
- Luff, Boy, after James Clarke Hook;
- Hesperus, In Memoriam, Mors Janua Vitæ, and Thy Will be done, after Joseph Noel Paton;
- The Marriage of the Prince and Princess of Wales, after William Powell Frith;
- Boswell's Introduction to Dr. Johnson, after Eyre Crowe;
- Christ weeping over Jerusalem, after Charles Lock Eastlake;
- An Old Monarch, A Humble Servant, An Old Pensioner, and the small plate of The Horse Fair, after Rosa Bonheur;
- The Triumph of Christianity over Paganism, after Gustave Doré.

He engraved also many plates from paintings by Thomas Brooks, Henry O'Neil, George B. O'Neill, George Henry Boughton, Philip Richard Morris, Richard Ansdell, Henry Le Jeune, James Sant, Frank Stone, Edouard Frère, and others.

Simmons left unfinished The Lion at Home (after Rosa Bonheur) which was completed by Thomas Lewis Atkinson. His prints appeared at the Royal Academy between 1857 and 1882.
