= Connoisseur (disambiguation) =

A connoisseur is a person who has expert knowledge in matters of taste or the fine arts.

Connoisseur may also refer to:

== Arts and media ==
- Connoisseur Media, a US radio station holding company
- The Connoisseur (magazine), a periodical on fine art, collectables and antique furniture founded in 1901, closed in 1992
- The Connoisseur (newspaper), a London weekly 18th century newspaper
- The Connoisseurs, an 1865 painting by Edwin Landseer
- The Connoisseur, a 1962 work by Norman Rockwell
- Connoisseur Society, a US audiophile classical and music jazz record label

== Other uses ==
- Connoisseur (Hi-Fi), a British manufacturer of Hi-Fi equipment
- Connoisseur Grammar School, a private school in Pakistan
- The Connoisseur car, a long-distance passenger railway carriage
- Rover 75 Connoisseur, a British luxury motor car
