= Robert Leahy Fair =

United States Army general

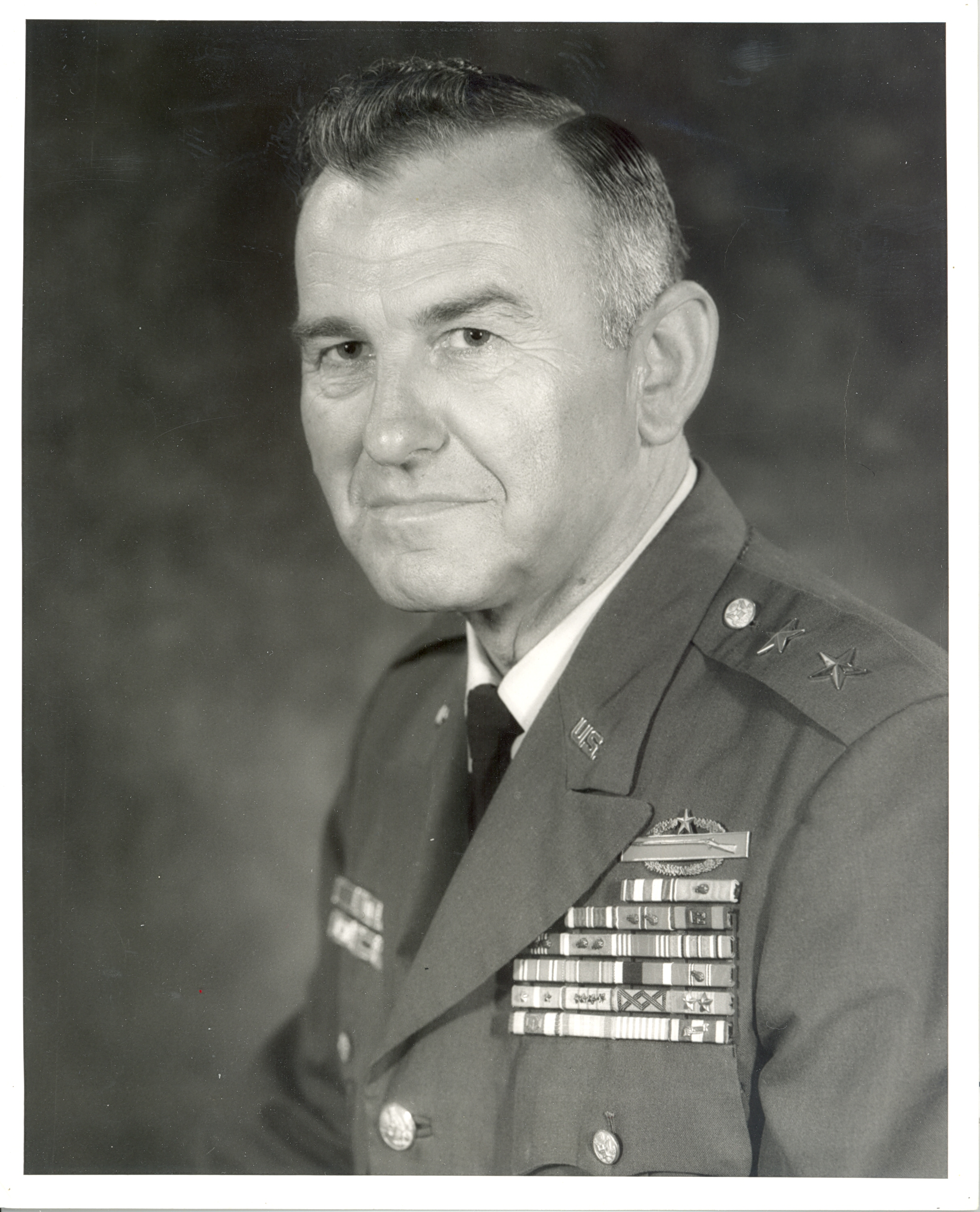
- Fair in June 1972
- Nickname: "Old Hardnose"
- Born: Robert Leahy Fair; May 18, 1923; San Francisco County, California, U.S.
- Died: September 14, 1983 (aged 60) Santa Clara, California, U.S.
- Allegiance: United States
- Branch: U.S. Army
- Service years: 1944–1976
- Rank: Lieutenant general
- Commands: V Corps; 2nd Armored Division; 1st Brigade, 25th Infantry Division; 1st Battalion, 6th Infantry Regiment
- Conflicts: World War II; Korean War; Vietnam War
- Awards: Silver Star; Legion of Merit with an oak leaf cluster Distinguished Flying Cross; Bronze Star with two oak leaf clusters Purple Heart with two oak leaf clusters
- Spouse: Alys Tendrich

Robert Leahy Fair (May 18, 1923 – September 14, 1983) was a United States Army lieutenant general and a field commander in Germany during the Cold War. Fair commanded V Corps from August 25, 1975, until January 4, 1976. After 32 years in the U.S. Army and service in three wars, Fair concluded his career in 1976, and died in 1983.

Fair received a Bachelor of Science degree from The University of Maryland in 1961, and a Master of Arts from George Washington University in 1963. He also attended the University of Michigan, where he studied the Japanese language in preparation for an assignment on General MacArthur's Staff.

"Fair's approach won plaudits. Novelist Josiah Bunting (The Lionheads), an ex-major himself, praised Fair's leathery style in a Playboy article last fall, describing the general as ‘an admirable soldier’ who is ‘always in bristling motion.’ But other officers, whose palms sweat when Fair raked them over with abrasive questions, disliked him intensely. To some enlisted men, Fair was a bush-league General Patton." One member of the Lancer Brigade said, "The colonel is a doer. When he decides something, that means we're gonna have some action."

A 1976 Time magazine article quoted an admiring captain as saying, "I'd have followed him into the jaws of hell—and had a hard time catching up with him."

== Early life and education ==
Born in San Francisco, California, Fair was the son of Robert A. Fair. He attended St. Paul's Grammar School in San Francisco and graduated in 1941 from the High School of Commerce, where he was active in the school's Reserve Officer Training Corps program.

Fair attended the University of San Francisco before receiving an appointment to the United States Military Academy. He entered West Point on July 19, 1942. He was appointed by Rep (R-CA) Richard J. Welch, the California 5th District. Found to be deficient in Mathematics, he was dismissed on January 12, 1943. Prior to his enlistment in the Army, he also attended the University of Chicago from 1943 to 1944.

Fair attended Infantry Officer Candidate School at Fort Benning, Georgia, and received his commission as an Infantry officer in 1944.

== Career ==
His initial assignment was as an instructor in the Weapons Department at The Infantry School, Fort Benning. Following attendance at the University of Michigan for Japanese language training, First Lieutenant Fair served as an intelligence officer and interpreter on General MacArthur's Staff in Tokyo from 1946 to 1948.

He returned to the United States in August 1948, and was assigned to Fort Lewis, Washington, where he served as a platoon leader and regimental staff officer with the 23d and 38th Infantry Regiments.

=== Korean War ===
Territory often changed hands early on in the Korean War, until the front stabilized.

Patch of the 2nd Infantry Division.

In August 1950, he accompanied the 38th Infantry Regiment to Korea. Fair served on the 38th Infantry Regimental Staff during the Korean War, where he fought on the Naktong River and later was to meet the Chinese Forces in North Korea; he later became the G-3 (Air), 2nd Infantry Division. Fair was awarded the Silver Star, Bronze Star, and Purple Heart medals and an Army Commendation Ribbon for meritorious service. On November 29, 1950, Captain Fair earned the Silver Star for actions with Headquarters Company, 38th Infantry Regiment, in the vicinity of Kunu-ri.

=== Interwar service ===
Upon returning to the United States, he served as Assistant G-3 (Operations), Sixth U.S. Army at The Presidio of San Francisco in California. In August 1952, he attended the Infantry Officers' Advanced Course at Fort Benning, Georgia. Upon graduation, Captain Fair was assigned as the Regimental Operations Officer (and Ceremonial Officer) for the 3d Infantry Regiment (The Old Guard) at Fort Myer, Virginia, until August 1954.

After attending the Command and General Staff College at Fort Leavenworth, Kansas, as a captain, Fair was assigned to Headquarters, V Corps, U.S. Army Europe as the Plans Officer, G-3/5/7.
He attended the Armed Forces Staff College in Norfolk, Virginia, from August 1958 to January 1959. From there he served as a staff officer in the Joint War Plans Division, Office of the Deputy Chief of Staff for Military Operations from January 1959 to August 1960.

His next assignment took him to Offutt Air Force Base, Nebraska, where he worked on the Joint Strategic Target Planning Staff as a Plans Officer. From August 1962 to June 1963, he attended the Naval War College in Newport, Rhode Island. Following this he became Secretary of the General Staff, Headquarters, Eighth U.S. Army from July 1963 to August 1964.

In August 1964, Lieutenant Colonel Fair assumed command of the 1st Battalion, 6th Infantry (Mechanized), 1st Armored Division at Fort Hood, Texas.

He then returned to Washington, D.C., where he served as a member of the Department of the Army Board of Inquiry on the Army Logistics System; the Chief of the Coordination Division, Office of the Chief of Staff, and subsequently as Executive Officer to the Vice Chief of Staff, U.S. Army.

=== Vietnam War ===
Patch of the 25th Infantry Division.

Colonel Fair commanded 1st Brigade, 25th Infantry Division in Tay Ninh, in South Vietnam, in 1968–1969. He received the Vietnamese Cross of Gallantry for his participation in heavy fighting around Ven Cau. During combat in Vietnam, his brigade was awarded the U. S. Valorous Unit Award and the Vietnamese Cross of Gallantry (with Palm). He was instrumental in establishing a "Holiday Inn" in the Tay Ninh province so that soldiers returning from combat missions had an opportunity to shower, do laundry, repair their gear, and get a good night's sleep, a hot meal, and a little rest and recuperation (R & R). Fair was quoted, "We want to make the man who struggles in the field day and night, week after week, feel like a king for a couple of days." He later became the Chief of Staff, 25th Infantry Division, in Cu Chi, Vietnam.

=== Cold War ===
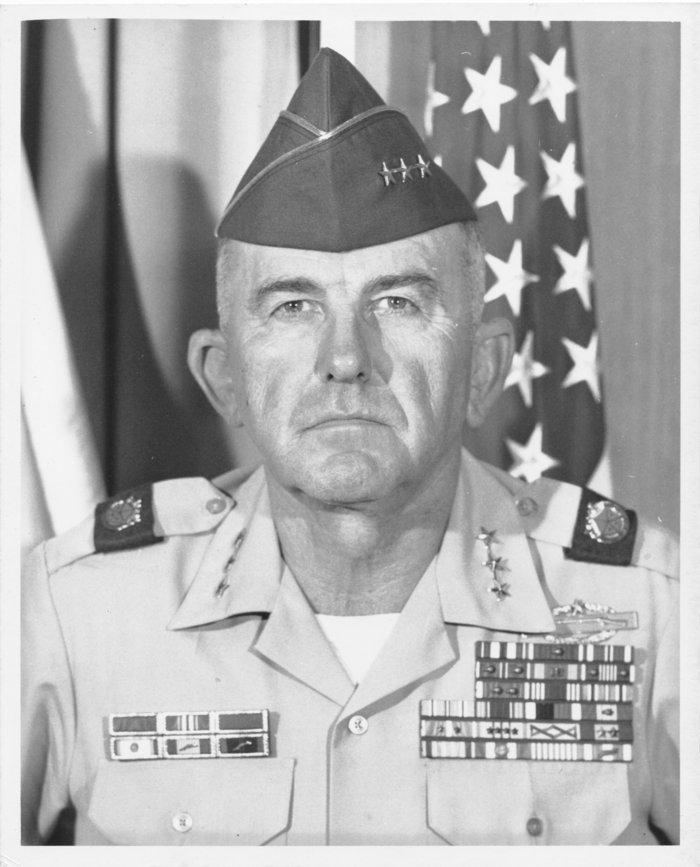
Fair in Class B uniform

Fair was assigned to the Management Information Systems Directorate, Office of the Assistant Vice Chief of Staff from September 1969 to April 1970. He later became Director of the Management Information Systems, and was promoted to Brigadier General. Fair commanded the 2nd Armored Division at Fort Hood from July 16, 1973, to August 5, 1975. He worked diligently for operations-intelligence integration as the 2nd Armored Division prepared for its return of forces to Germany (Exercise Reforger) mission, and their annual Reforger exercise supporting the Army’s operational plans. During the Cold War, the 2nd Armored Division's primary mission was to prepare to conduct heavy armored combat against Warsaw Pact forces in defense of NATO. Hell On Wheels formed a key component of the U.S. military's plan to move "ten divisions in ten days" to Europe in the event of a Soviet threat to NATO. The division practiced this task numerous times during Exercise REFORGER (Return of Forces to Germany) from 1967 to 1988.

Josiah Bunting noted in his 1975 article on the Volunteer Army: "In fiscal 1974, Fair's division reenlistment goal was 813: 1222 took their burst of six. In July 1973, before Fair got to the division, the A.W.O.L. rate was 44 per 1000; a year later, it was 14 per 1000. From January to June 1974, 1194 troopers raised their G.T. scores, and of all the soldiers who re-upped when Fair was in command, 72 percent re-enlisted for his division." Bunting commented that Fair would be "a tough act to follow."

Patch of the V Corps

On August 25, 1975, Lieutenant General Fair assumed command of V Corps at Frankfurt, Federal Republic of Germany from Lieutenant General William R. Desobry. He was responsible for the training and readiness of V Corps, headquartered at Abrams Barracks, which included the 8th Infantry Division (Mechanized) "Pathfinder," the 3rd Armored Division "Spearhead," and the 11th Armored Cavalry Regiment "Blackhorse." Major General John R. D. Cleland commanded the "Pathfinder" Division, which was headquartered at Rose Barracks, Bad Kreuznach. Major General (later Lieutenant General) Charles J. Simmons commanded the "Spearhead" Division headquartered at Frankfurt. Colonel (later Lieutenant General) John L. Ballantyne III commanded the "Blackhorse" Regiment headquartered at Fulda.

While he was reportedly the only modern day corps commander to be relieved of duty during peacetime, a Time magazine article noted, "Lieut. General Robert L. Fair is headed for a more prosaic destination, however, and defenders of a tough, no nonsense, old-style Army are dismayed. As of next week Fair, 52, will retire for 'personal reasons' – the most important being that he and his commanding officer hated each other's guts." General George S. Blanchard served as the USAREUR Commander from 1975 to 1979. In fact there is no evidence that either general did not respect the other. Truth of the matter, Gen Fair was most concerned about troop readiness and Gen Blanchard was concerned about his obligations to Congress. Both Generals were dedicated to service to the US Army. Gen Blanchard sent Gen Fair a back channel message advising him to return monies he had transferred from construction to training back to construction. Gen Fair did not do so. These funds were regulated by US Congress. Lieutenant General (later General) Donn A. Starry assumed command of V Corps on February 16, 1976.

== Later life and death ==
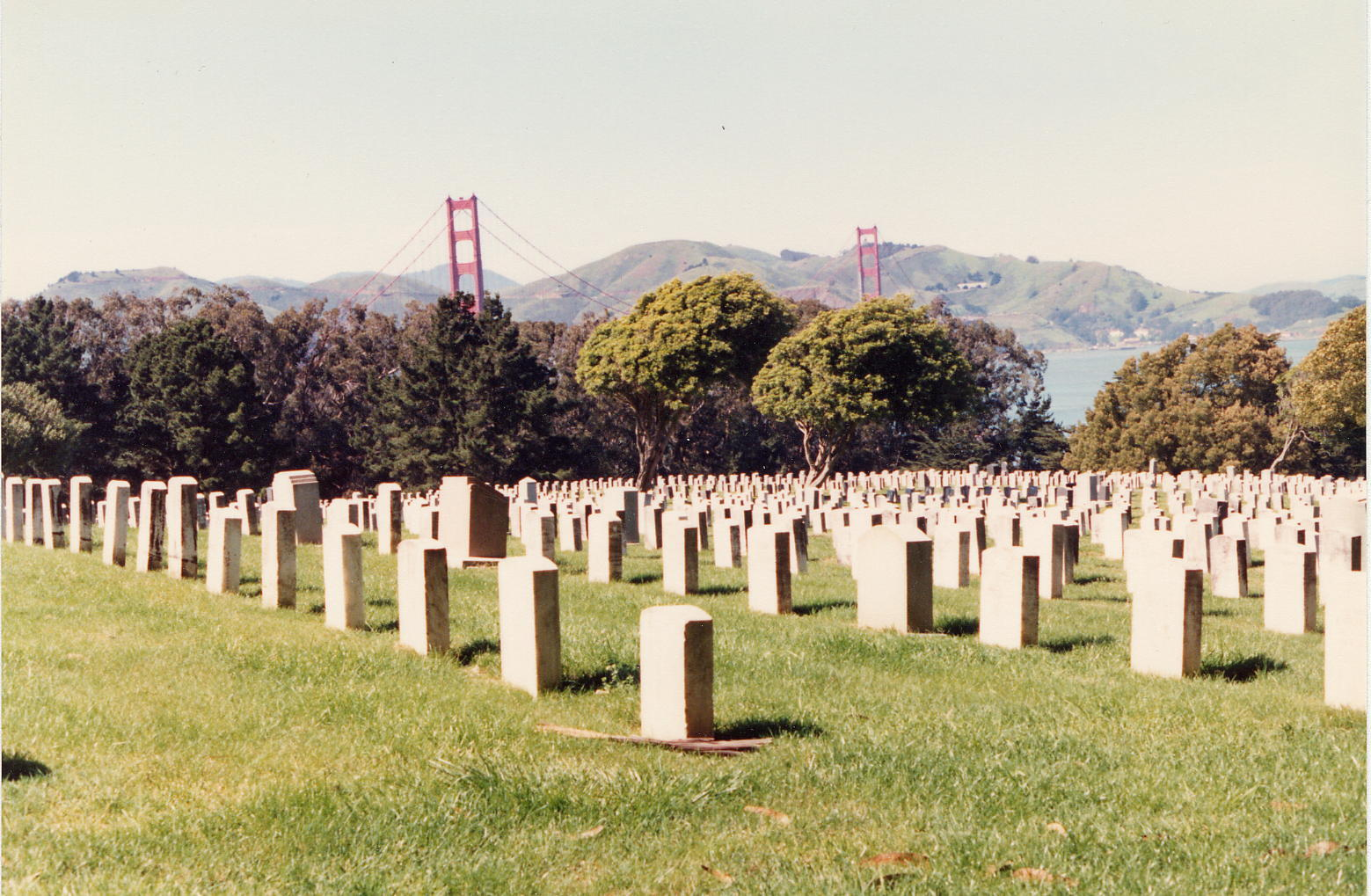
The San Francisco National Cemetery

Following retirement from the military, Fair worked for SRI International, formerly Stanford Research Institute, before transitioning to Lockheed Corporation. While at Lockheed, he worked on the MQM-105 Aquila remote piloted vehicle (RPV), now called unmanned aerial vehicles (UAV).

Fair died on September 14, 1983, at Santa Clara, California.

== Personal life ==
Fair was married to the former Alys Tendrich on July 9, 1949. They had three children.

== Dates of rank ==
Second Lieutenant	First Lieutenant	Captain
O-1	O-2	O-3
November 18, 1944	April 22, 1946	September 27, 1950

Major	Lieutenant Colonel	Colonel
O-4	O-5	O-6
July 10, 1956	June 13, 1961	October 12, 1966

Brigadier General	Major General	Lieutenant General
O-7	O-8	O-9
June 1, 1970	May 1, 1972	August 5, 1975

== Awards and decorations ==
Military Decorations
Combat Infantryman Badge with Star (2nd award)
Army Staff Identification Badge

General Fair’s awards include the Silver Star, Legion of Merit with two Oak Leaf Clusters, Distinguished Flying Cross, Bronze Star with two Oak Leaf Clusters, Purple Heart with two Oak Leaf Clusters, Air Medal, Combat Infantryman’s Badge with Star (two awards), and Army Staff Identification Badge. His foreign awards include the Vietnam Distinguished Service Order (2nd Class), Vietnam Cross of Gallantry with Gold and Bronze Stars, the Vietnam Armed Forces Honor Medal (1st Class), and the Vietnam Psychological Operations Award (1st and 2nd Class).

Silver Star
Legion of Merit (with Oak Leaf Cluster)
Distinguished Flying Cross
Bronze Star (with 2 Oak Leaf Clusters)
Air Medal with award numeral 13 (13 Awards)
Army Commendation Medal (with 2 Oak Leaf Clusters)
Purple Heart (with 2 Oak Leaf Clusters)
Army Good Conduct Medal
American Campaign Medal
Asiatic-Pacific Campaign Medal
World War II Victory Medal
Army of Occupation Medal with Japan Campaign Clasp
National Defense Service Medal (with Oak Leaf Cluster)
Korean Service Medal (with 6 Campaign Stars)
Vietnam Service Medal (with 4 Campaign Stars)
Vietnam Distinguished Service Order, 2nd Class
Vietnam Gallantry Cross with Gold and Bronze Stars
Vietnam Armed Forces Honor Medal, 1st Class
United Nations Service Medal
Vietnam Campaign Medal
Korean War Service Medal
Army Presidential Unit Citation
Valorous Unit Award
Meritorious Unit Commendation
Republic of Korea Presidential Unit Citation
Vietnam Gallantry Cross Unit Citation with Palm
Vietnam Civil Actions Unit Citation

== Assignment history ==
- 1944: Graduation from Officer Candidate School, Fort Benning, Georgia
- 1946: Central Interrogation Center, Far East Command, Tokyo, Japan
- 1950: 38th Infantry, 2nd Infantry Division, Republic of Korea
- 1955: Graduate, Army Command and General Staff College, Fort Leavenworth, Kansas
- 1959: Graduate, Armed Forces Staff College, Norfolk, Virginia
- 1963: Graduate, Naval War College, Newport, Rhode Island
- 1964: Commander, 1st Battalion, 6th Infantry, Fort Hood, Texas
- 1968: Commander, 1st Brigade, 25th Infantry Division, Cu Chi, Republic of Vietnam
- 1969: Chief of Staff, 25th Infantry Division, Cu Chi, Republic of Vietnam
- 1970: Director, Management Information Systems, Department of the Army
- 1973: Commanding General, 2nd Armored Division, Fort Hood, Texas
- 1975: Commanding General, V Corps, Frankfurt, Federal Republic of Germany
- 1976: Retired from active service

== See also ==
- 2nd Armored Division (United States)
- V Corps (United States)
