= William R. Desobry =

United States Army general

William Robertson Desobry
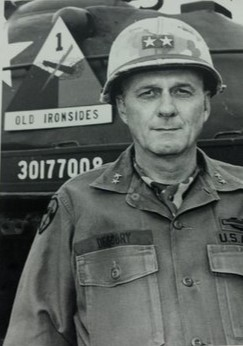
- Desobry as a Major General commanding the 1st Armored Division
- Nicknames: "Bill" "Des"
- Born: September 11, 1918; Manila, Philippines
- Died: January 12, 1996 (aged 77) San Antonio, Texas, U.S.
- Allegiance: United States
- Branch: United States Army
- Service years: 1941–1975
- Rank: Lieutenant General
- Commands: V Corps; United States Army Armor School; 1st Armored Division; Combat Command C, 2d Armored Division; 20th Armored Infantry Battalion
- Conflicts: World War II; Ardennes-Alsace; Siege of Bastogne; Vietnam War
- Awards: Distinguished Service Medal (2); Silver Star; Legion of Merit (5); Bronze Star (2); Purple Heart

William Robertson Desobry (September 11, 1918 – January 12, 1996) was a senior U.S. Army field commander in Germany during the Cold War, and a Lieutenant General in the United States Army. General Desobry was a decorated hero from World War II, and played a significant role as an advisor to the Republic of Vietnam Army and on the Army Staff during the Vietnam War. In addition to commanding a division and corps, he was the Commanding General of the Armor Center and was the President of the Tank Task Force, which led to the creation of the M1 Abrams.

After 34 years in the Army and service in two wars, Lieutenant General Desobry completed his military career in 1975.

== Education ==
Desobry received a Bachelor of Science degree in 1941 from Georgetown University, where he was a distinguished graduate of their Reserve Officer Training Corps program and earned a Regular Army commission.

== Early biography ==
Born in Manila in the Philippine Islands in 1918, Desobry was the son of Colonel and Mrs. Elmer C. Desobry. He attended high-schools in Chicago, Illinois, and Honolulu, Hawaii–graduating from Punahou Academy in 1936. John McManus described Desobry:

"Rail-thin at six-feet-four and one-hundred-sixty pounds, he was the son of a career soldier. He qualified as something of a family rebel because he had elected to go to Georgetown University instead of West Point. He had graduated in 1941 with an ROTC (Reserve Officers' Training Corps) commission. Although he had been in the Army only four years, he had deployed overseas as commander of the 20th Armored Infantry Battalion because of his natural leadership skills. His subsequent performance in combat only enhanced his fine reputation. Now he found himself in charge of 325 soldiers and fifteen tanks in a mixed task force generally known as 'Team Desobry.'"

== World War II ==
General Desobry's service during World War II included a tour of duty with the 29th Infantry Regiment at Fort Benning, Georgia and the 10th Armored Division in CONUS, and the European Theater of Operations. He commanded an armored infantry battalion task force during the defense of Bastogne, and was wounded and hospitalized by the Germans at Ibbenbueren, Germany. He was liberated in the spring of 1945 after imprisonment at Fallingbostel, Germany, a branch of the Belsen prison camp, and at Brunswick, Germany. Charles MacDonald, noted Army historian and Battle of the Bulge veteran, described then Major Desobry's heroic actions in his 1997 book, A Time for Trumpets. It is arguably the definitive account of this dramatic victory and displays the actions of Desobry and his armored-infantrymen, often in close combat and at times in hand-to-hand combat.

The road between Noville and Bourcy, which Team Desobry held briefly during the defense of Bastogne, was renamed Rue du Général Desobry in his honor.

== Post-war service ==
Upon his return to the United States, Lieutenant Colonel Desobry served for short periods at Fort Rucker and Fort McClellan, Alabama and in G2, Department of the Army. In July 1946, he returned to Europe where he served as an Assistant G1 in Headquarters, Third Army and US Forces in Austria.

Upon his return to the United States in 1950, he attended the Command and General Staff College at Fort Leavenworth, Kansas and subsequently served four years on the faculty.

He returned to Germany in 1955 and served as Commanding Officer, Combat Command C, 2d Armored Division, and later Chief of Staff, 2d Armored Division and G3, V Corps. Upon his return to the United States in 1958, he attended the National War College, graduating in 1959. He was then assigned to the Office Chief of Legislative Liaison, where he served for three years in the Plans and Projects Division.

In 1962 he was assigned to the faculty of the Army War College, Carlisle Barracks, Pennsylvania, where he served as a Course Director, Chairman of a Faculty Group, and the Chairman of the Department of Strategy.

== Vietnam War ==
From August 1965 to June 1966, Colonel Desobry was assigned to Headquarters Military Assistance Command, Vietnam (MAC-V) with duty as Deputy Senior Advisor to the ARVN IV Corps in the delta region of Vietnam under Colonel George Barton. On June 3, 1966, Brigadier General Desobry assumed duties as the Senior Advisor to the ARVN IV Corps. Desobry and his advisory teams were involved in four campaigns during his two and a half years tour: Defense; and Counter-Offensive Phases 1–3. IV Corps was the southernmost of the four major military and administrative units of South Vietnam in the 1960s and early 1970s. Its headquarters were located at Cần Thơ in the Mekong Delta. Also known as Military Region 4 (MR 4), IV Corps was the fourth allied tactical combat zone. Because of the nature of its terrain, and more important, its geographical isolation from major North Vietnamese strongholds, the Delta area had generally been infiltrated by enemy guerrilla or small force rather than large force bands. Thus, except for the Mobile 3 Riverine Force and small Special Forces units, no U.S. troops had normally operated in the area until Operation Deckhouse V in 1967 when the U.S. 9th Infantry Division initiated two years of intensive antiguerrilla activities. Otherwise, MR 4 had been and continued to be primarily a Vietnamese area of operations. Brigadier General Desobry turned over his duties to Major general George S. Eckhardt, and left Vietnam on January 14, 1968, only three weeks before the Tet Offensive.

== Cold War service ==
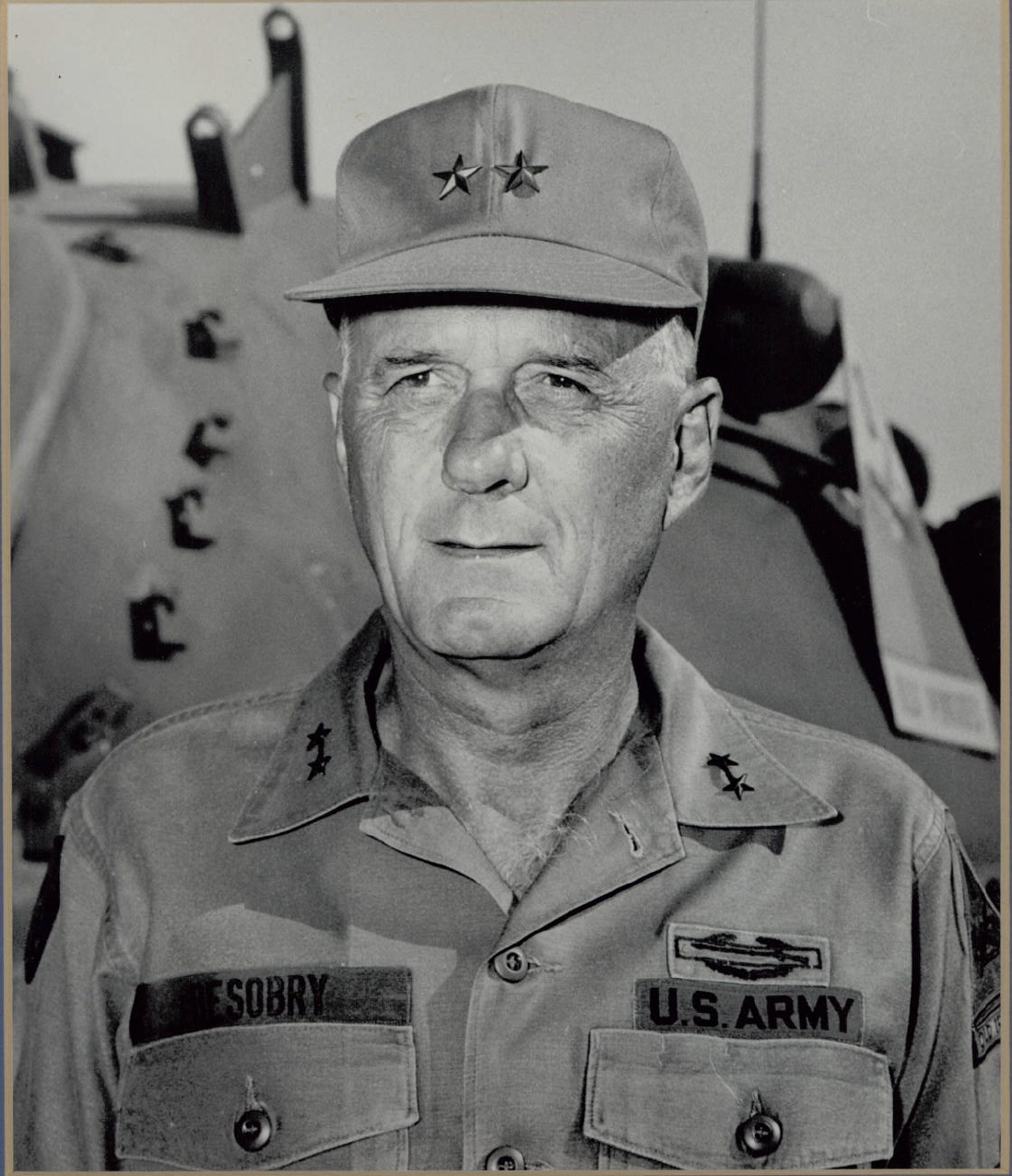
MG Desobry in fatigue style uniform

Following over two years as Senior Advisor to the ARVN IV Corps, Brigadier General Desobry became the Director of Army Operations, The Army Staff. Major General Desobry then served as Commanding General of the 1st Armored Division at Fort Hood, Texas from 1969 to 1971. In 1971, he became the Commanding General of the Armor Center and Armor School at Fort Knox, Kentucky. While there, he was appointed President of the XM1 Tank Task Force, which led to the M1 Abrams.

In 1968, Desobry returned to Washington, D. C. where he served as a member of the Department of the Army Board of Inquiry on the Army Logistics System; the Chief of the Coordination Division, Office of the Chief of Staff, and subsequently as Executive Officer to the Vice Chief of Staff, U. S. Army.

On June 1, 1973, Lieutenant General Desobry assumed command of V Corps at Frankfurt, Federal Republic of Germany from Lieutenant General Willard Pearson. He was responsible for the training and readiness of V Corps, headquartered at Abrams Barracks, which included the 8th Infantry Division (Mechanized) "Pathfinder," the 3rd Armored Division "Spearhead," and the 11th Armored Cavalry Regiment "Blackhorse." Major General Joseph C. McDonough commanded the "Pathfinder" Division, which was headquartered at Rose Barracks, Bad Kreuznach. Major General Jonathan R. "Jack" Burton commanded the "Spearhead" Division headquartered at Frankfurt. Colonel (later Lieutenant General) Robert L. Schweitzer (1973–1974) and Colonel (later Lieutenant General) John L. Ballantyne III (1974–1976) commanded the "Blackhorse" Regiment headquartered at Fulda.

Desobry turned over command of V Corps to Lieutenant General Robert L. Fair on August 24, 1975.

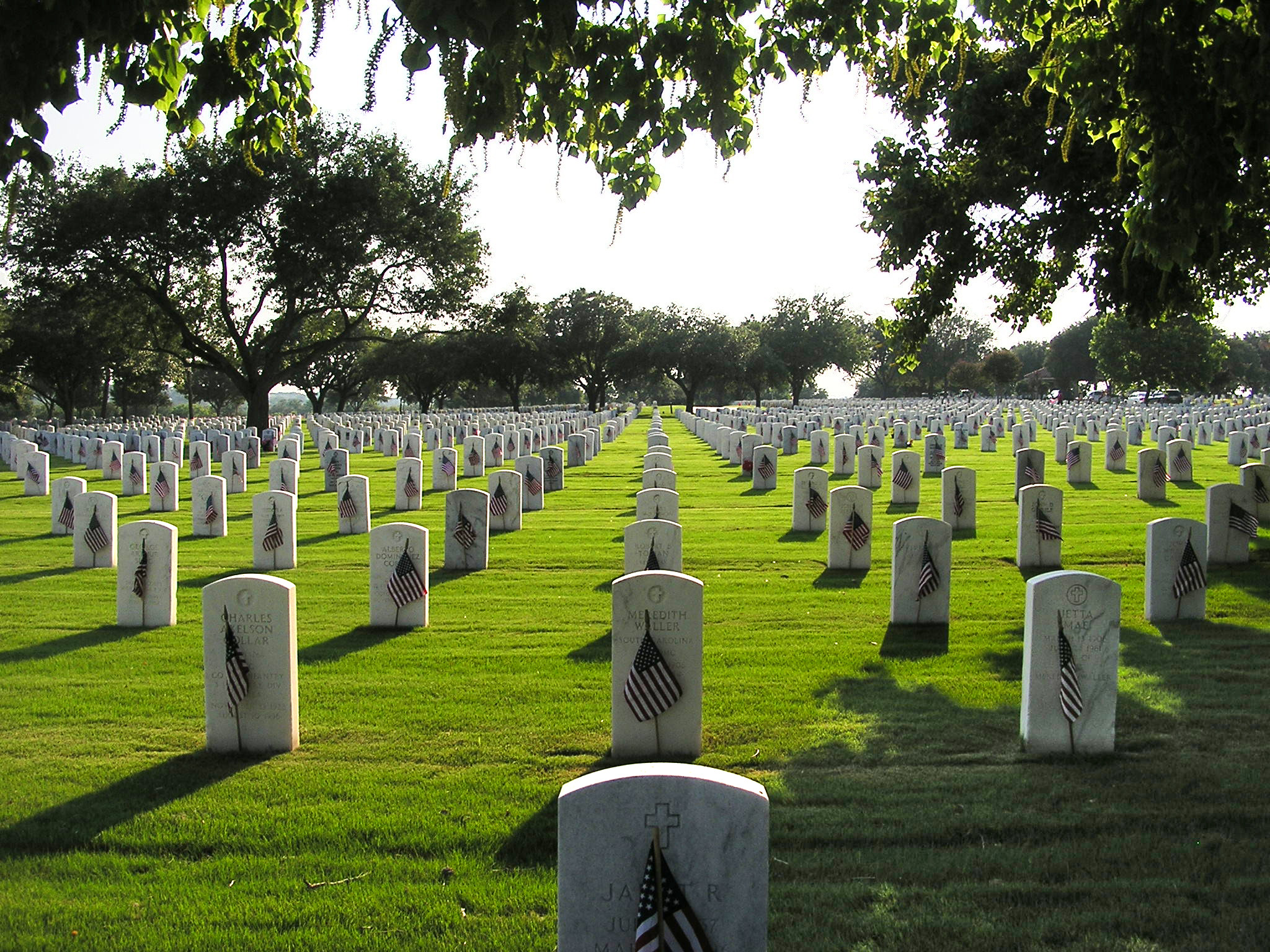
Fort Sam Houston National Cemetery, Memorial Day, 2010.

== Retirement ==
Lieutenant General Desobry continued to support the Armor community after his retirement from Army. As a result, he received the U.S. Cavalry and Armor Association's Gold Medallion Winners Hall of Fame in 1989.

Desobry died on January 12, 1996, in San Antonio, Texas.

== Personal life ==
General Desobry was married to the former Jacqueline Keyes of San Antonio, Texas, on August 22, 1942. They had six children. Mrs. Desobry died in San Antonio on September 10, 2011.

=== Rank earned ===
Second Lieutenant	First Lieutenant	Captain
O-1	O-2	O-3
May 29, 1941	June 19, 1942	February 19, 1943

Major	Lieutenant Colonel	Colonel
O-4	O-5	O-6
October 27, 1943	March 20, 1945	September 2, 1965

Brigadier General	Major General	Lieutenant General
O-7	O-8	O-9
September 2, 1965	September 1, 1966	September 18, 1968

== Awards and decorations ==
General Desobry's awards include the Distinguished Service Medal with Oak Leaf Cluster, Silver Star, Legion of Merit with four Oak Leaf Clusters, Bronze Star Medal, Purple Heart, Air Medal (10 awards), Prisoner of War Medal, Combat Infantryman's Badge, and Army Staff Identification Badge. His foreign awards include the French Croix de Guerre with 2 Silver Palms and 1 Bronze Palm, Belgian Croix de Guerre with Palm, French Legion of Honour, German Verdienstkreuz, Vietnamese Cross of Gallantry with Gold and Bronze Stars, and the Vietnam Armed Forces Honor Medal (1st Class).

Military Decorations
Combat Infantryman Badge
Army Staff Identification Badge
Distinguished Service Medal with Oak Leaf Cluster
Silver Star
Legion of Merit (with Oak Leaf Cluster)
Bronze Star with Oak Leaf Cluster
Air Medal with award numeral 10 (10 awards)
Purple Heart
Prisoner of War Medal
American Defense Service Medal
American Campaign Medal
European-African-Middle Eastern Campaign Medal
World War II Victory Medal
Army of Occupation Medal with Germany Campaign Clasp
National Defense Service Medal (with oak leaf cluster)
Vietnam Service Medal (with 4 Campaign Stars)
Vietnam Gallantry Cross with gilt and bronze star
Vietnam Armed Forces Honor Medal, 1st Class
Vietnam Campaign Medal
Army Presidential Unit Citation
Meritorious Unit Commendation
Vietnam Gallantry Cross Unit Citation with Palm

== Assignment history ==
- 1941: Graduation from Georgetown University Army Reserve Officer Training Corps Program, Washington, D.C.
- 1943: Commander, 20th Armored Infantry Battalion, 10th Armored Division
- 1944: Commander, "Team Desobry"—a battalion-sized tank-infantry task force of the 10th Armored Division—Noville, Belgium
- 1945: Prisoner of War
- 1951: Graduate, Army Command and General Staff College, Fort Leavenworth, Kansas
- 1954: Commander, Combat Command C, 2d Armored Division
- 1959: Graduate, National War College, Fort McNair, Washington, D.C.
- 1965: Deputy Senior Advisor, IV ARVN Corps, Republic of Vietnam
- 1966: Senior Advisor, IV ARVN Corps, Republic of Vietnam
- 1968: Director of Operations, Deputy Chief of Staff for Military Operations, U.S. Army, Washington, D.C.
- 1969: Commanding General, 1st Armored Division, Fort Hood, Texas
- 1971: Commanding General, U.S. Army Armor Center and School, Fort Knox, Kentucky
- 1973: Commanding General, V Corps, Frankfurt, Federal Republic of Germany
- 1975: Retired from active service

== See also ==
- 1st Armored Division (United States)
- V Corps (United States)

Military offices
Preceded by John K. Boles, Jr.	Commander, 1st Armored Division; February 1970–March 1971	Succeeded by James C. Smith
Preceded by Willard Pearson	Commanding General, V Corps; 1 June 1973–24 August 1975	Succeeded by Robert L. Fair
