= Sir Edwin Landseer in His Studio =

Painting by John Ballantyne

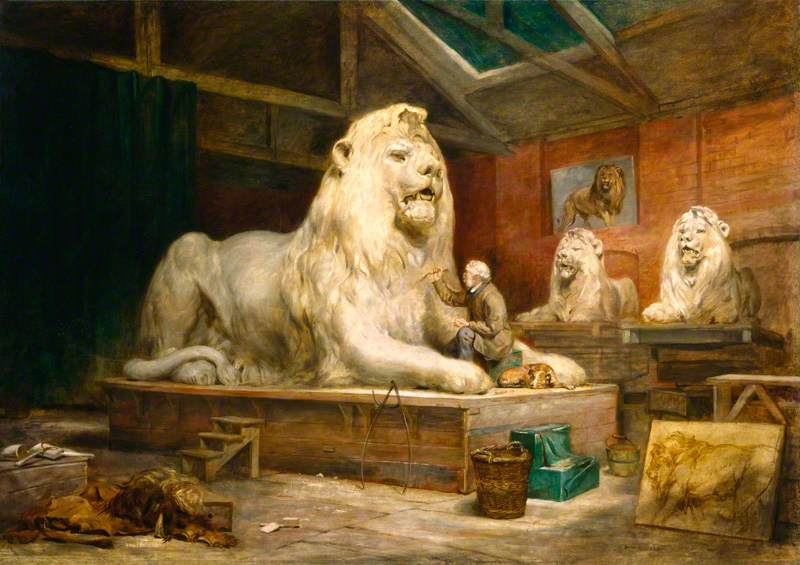
- Artist: John Ballantyne
- Year: c.1865
- Type: Oil on canvas, portrait painting
- Dimensions: 80 cm × 113 cm (31 in × 44 in)
- Location: National Portrait Gallery; London

Sir Edwin Landseer in His Studio is an 1865 portrait painting by the British artist John Ballantyne showing Edwin Landseer at work. Landseer, a noted animal painter, was commissioned to create sculptures for the lions at the base of Nelson's Column in Trafalgar Square. He is shown working in the borrowed London studio of Carlo Marochetti.

Ballantyne (1815-1897) was a Scottish painter who had trained in Edinburgh under William Allan. This is one of a series of depictions of leading artists at work including Francis Grant, William Holman Hunt and John Phillip, some of which are in the Scottish National Gallery in Edinburgh.

Ballantyne displayed this and other his other pictures of artists in a one-man exhibition in Pall Mall. Landseer objected to this as he didn't want the painting to be seen until the lions were finished and on display in Trafalgar Square and Ballantyne withdrew it from the exhibition and didn't publicise it until 1867. It was then engraved as a lithograph. The painting was then acquired by the art collector William Wells, a noted patron of Landseer. The work is today in the collection of the National Portrait Gallery in London, having been gifted by Wells in 1890.

== Bibliography ==
- Hargreaves, Roger. Trafalgar Square: Through the Camera. National Portrait Gallery Publications, 2005.
- Galinou, Mireille. Cottages and Villas: The Birth of the Garden Suburb. Yale University Press, 2010.
- Ormond, Richard. Early Victorian Portraits, National Portrait Gallery, 1974. .
