= Saint Elizabeth of Hungary's Great Act of Renunciation =

Painting by Philip Hermogenes Calderon

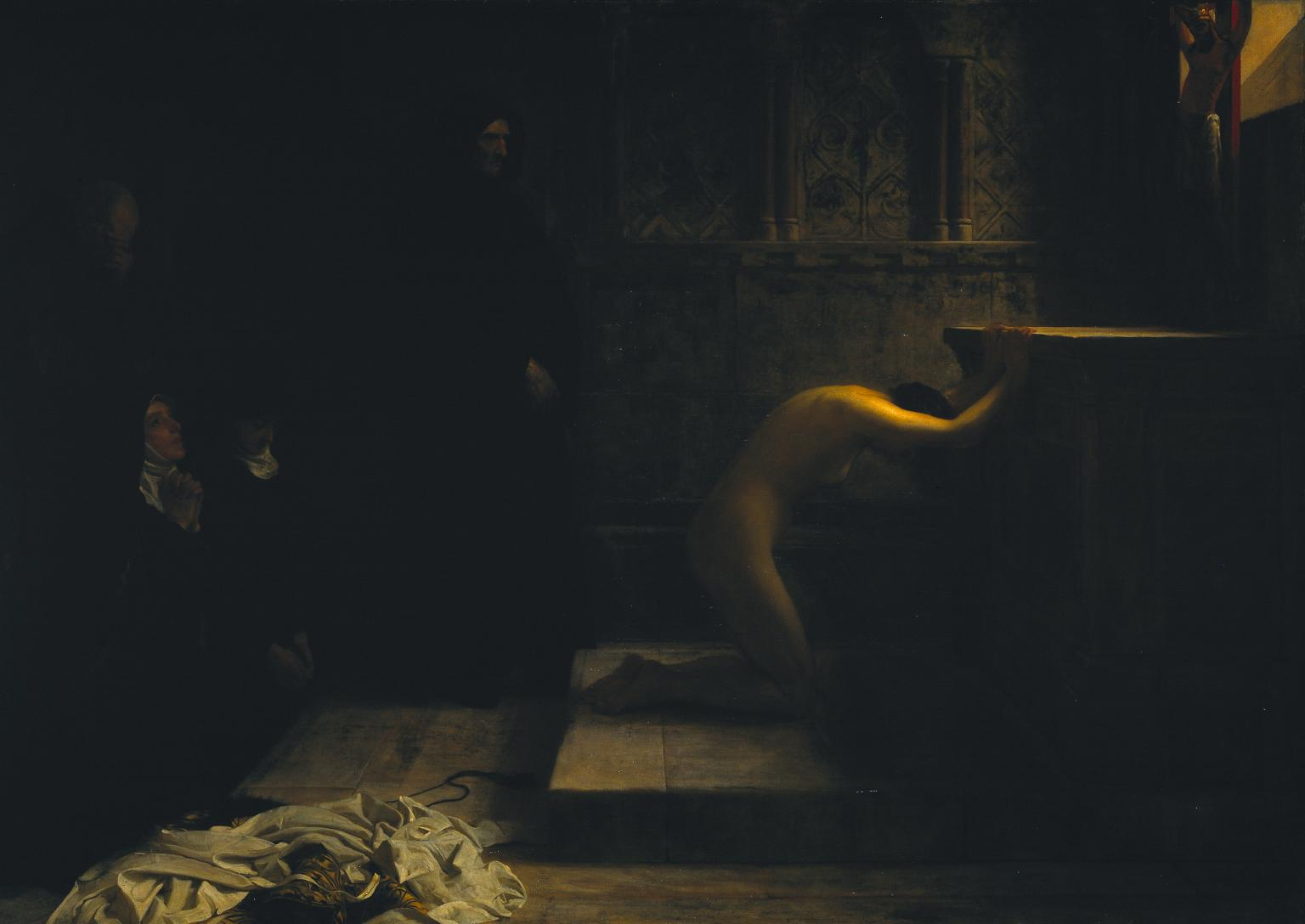
- Artist: Philip Hermogenes Calderon
- Year: 1891
- Type: Oil on canvas, history painting
- Dimensions: 153 cm × 213.4 cm (60 in × 84.0 in)
- Location: Tate Britain, London

Saint Elizabeth of Hungary's Great Act of Renunciation is an 1891 religious history painting by the British artist Philip Hermogenes Calderon. It depicts Catholic saint Elizabeth of Hungary. The widow of Louis IV, Landgrave of Thuringia, who had died while departing for the Sixth Crusade, she entered a convent after his death. Calderon was inspired by the 1848 play The Saint's Tragedy by Charles Kingsley. He shows Elizabeth, having renounced all worldly possessions, kneeling naked in prayer. A group of nuns and monks are shown behind her.

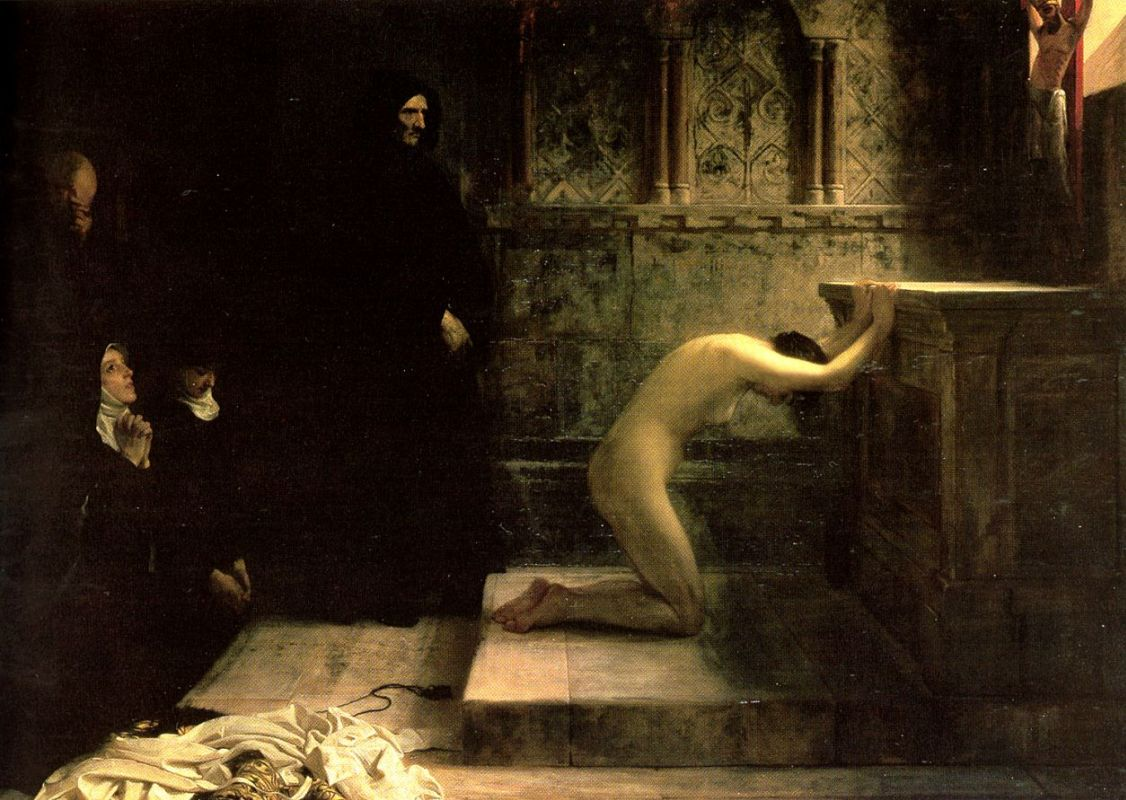
Alternative, brighter image of the painting

Calderon was born in France and initially followed the Pre-Raphaelite style. This work was produced towards the end of his career. The picture was displayed at the Royal Academy Exhibition of 1892 at Burlington House in London. Some Catholic groups objected to its portrayal of a venerated Catholic figure and unsuccessfully attempted to have it withdrawn from the exhibition. Today it is in the collection of the Tate Britain, having been acquired through the Chantrey Bequest.

== Bibliography ==
- Sullivan, Karen. The Inner Lives of Medieval Inquisitors. University of Chicago Press, 2011.
- Wagner, Corinna & Parker, Joanne. The Oxford Handbook of Victorian Medievalism. Oxford University Press, 2020.
