= John Ballentine =

John Ballentine may refer to:

- John Goff Ballentine (1825–1915), American politician
- John J. Ballentine (1896–1970), United States naval aviator
- John J. Ballentine (politician) (1927–2006), American politician

== See also ==
- John Ballantyne (disambiguation)
