= John Ballantyne =

John Ballantyne may refer to:

- John Bellenden (fl. 1533–1587), or Ballantyne, Scottish writer
- John Ballantyne (publisher) (1774–1821), Scottish publisher
- John Ballantyne (footballer) (1892–after 1917), Scottish footballer
- Johnny Ballantyne (1899–1977), Scottish footballer
- John Ballantyne (minister) (1778–1830), Scottish minister of religion
- John L. Ballantyne III (born 1931), American general
- John William Ballantyne (1861–1923), Scottish physician
- John Ballantine (banker) (1743–1812), Scottish merchant, banker and friend of Robert Burns

== See also ==
- Jon Ballantyne (born 1963), Canadian musician
- Jon Ballantyne (footballer) (born 1969), Australian rules footballer
- John Ballantine House
- John Ballentine (disambiguation)
