= The Black Stream =

Painting by Gustave Courbet

- Le ruisseau noir (French)
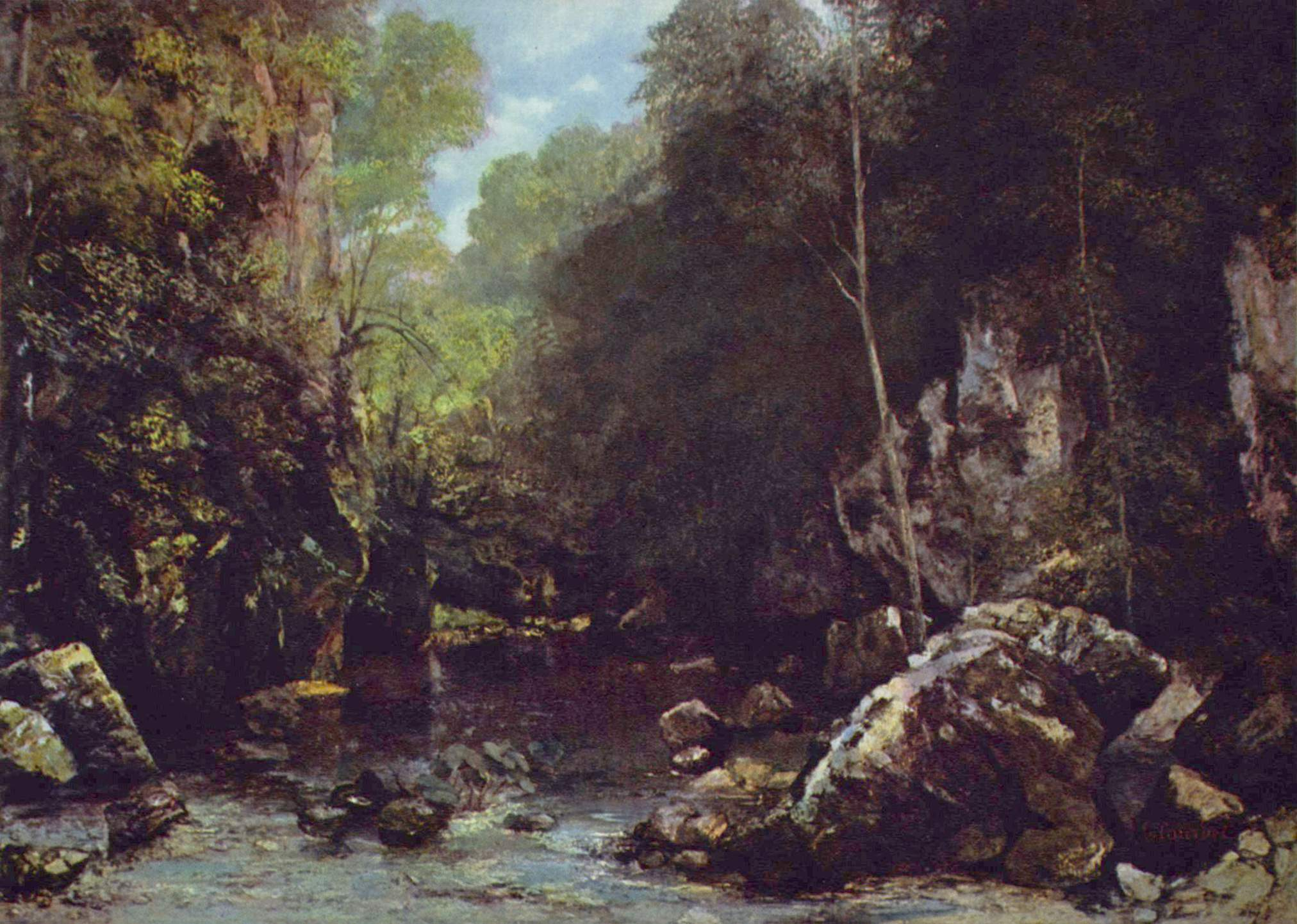
- Artist: Gustave Courbet
- Year: 1865
- Medium: Oil on canvas
- Dimensions: 93.5 cm × 131.5 cm (36.8 in × 51.8 in)
- Location: Musée d'Orsay, Paris

The Black Stream (also known as Stream in a Ravine) is an oil-on-canvas landscape painted in 1865 by the French artist Gustave Courbet. It held at the Musée d'Orsay in Paris.

== History ==
This picture was included in the Exposition Universelle of 1867, and was bought from the artist in the same year by the Comte de Nieuwerkerque, Director of Museums, for Napoleon III, at the price of 2000 French francs. It was part of the Emperor's personal property, and was allotted to the Louvre by the Tribunal de la Seine, along with other paintings, on 12 February 1879. In 1881, it was exhibited in the Luxembourg, with the title Le puits noir (The Black Ravine), which is really the name of another work painted in 1869.

The landscape is currently housed and exhibited at the Musée d'Orsay in Paris, and represents a gorge, a ravine through which runs a winding stream, its bed littered with rocks, between steep walls covered with wild vegetation. The stream depicted is the Loue, a capricious creek flowing through the village of Ornans, where Courbet was born. The artist seems to have returned to this spot several times: it can be recognised in a number of his paintings

Of this landscape, Courbet wrote:

It is perhaps the best I have ever painted; it shows the Loue walled up between vast boulders of mossy rock, with thick sunlit foliage in the background.

Courbet loved to seek out some unspoilt corner in these lonely gorges, where the damp atmosphere conveys the impression of a strange world from which the primordial waters have only just receded. In this work, in which one senses the enthusiasm of the artist, Courbet's technique is at its peak of perfection. He has only used the brush in the background shadows; elsewhere the painting has been done with the palette knife. Courbet crushes his pigments and spreads them diagonally with his knife, thus letting underlying wads of paint show through: this creates the effect of transparency and depth as rich as those obtained by means of glazes in the work of earlier artists. His splendid greens evoke the luxuriance of a semi-aquatic world where vegetation runs riot.
