= Her Most High, Noble and Puissant Grace =

Painting by Philip Hermogenes Calderon

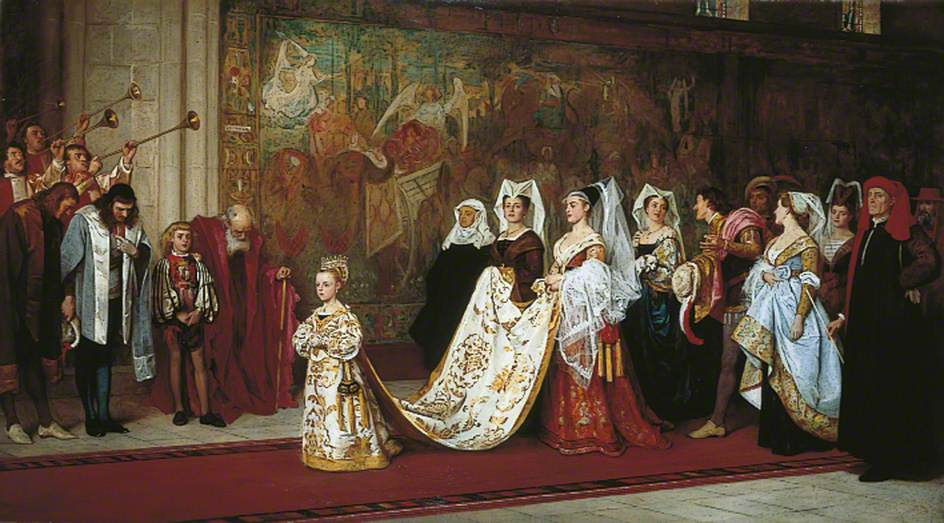
- Artist: Philip Hermogenes Calderon
- Year: 1865
- Type: Oil on canvas, history painting
- Dimensions: 119.4 cm × 213.4 cm (47.0 in × 84.0 in)
- Location: Leeds Art Gallery, Leeds, England

Her Most High, Noble and Puissant Grace is an 1865 history painting by the French-born British artist Philip Hermogenes Calderon. It depicts a scene from the fifteenth century in which a young child monarch goes through extravagant court ceremonials. The Art Journal praised it as his most important work yet.

The painting was first displayed at the Royal Academy Exhibition of 1866 held at the National Gallery in London. The following year it was exhibited at the Exposition Universelle in Paris, where it was awarded a gold medal. Today the painting is in the collection of Leeds Art Gallery in Yorkshire, having been donated by Sir James Kitson in 1903.

== Bibliography ==
- Higgins, Leslie (ed.) The Collected Works of Gerard Manley Hopkins: Volume III. Oxford University Press, 2006.
- Trumble, Angus. Love & Death: Art in the Age of Queen Victoria. Art Gallery of South Australia, 2001.
