= The Studio of Salvator Rosa in the Mountains of the Abruzzi =

Painting by Thomas Jones Barker

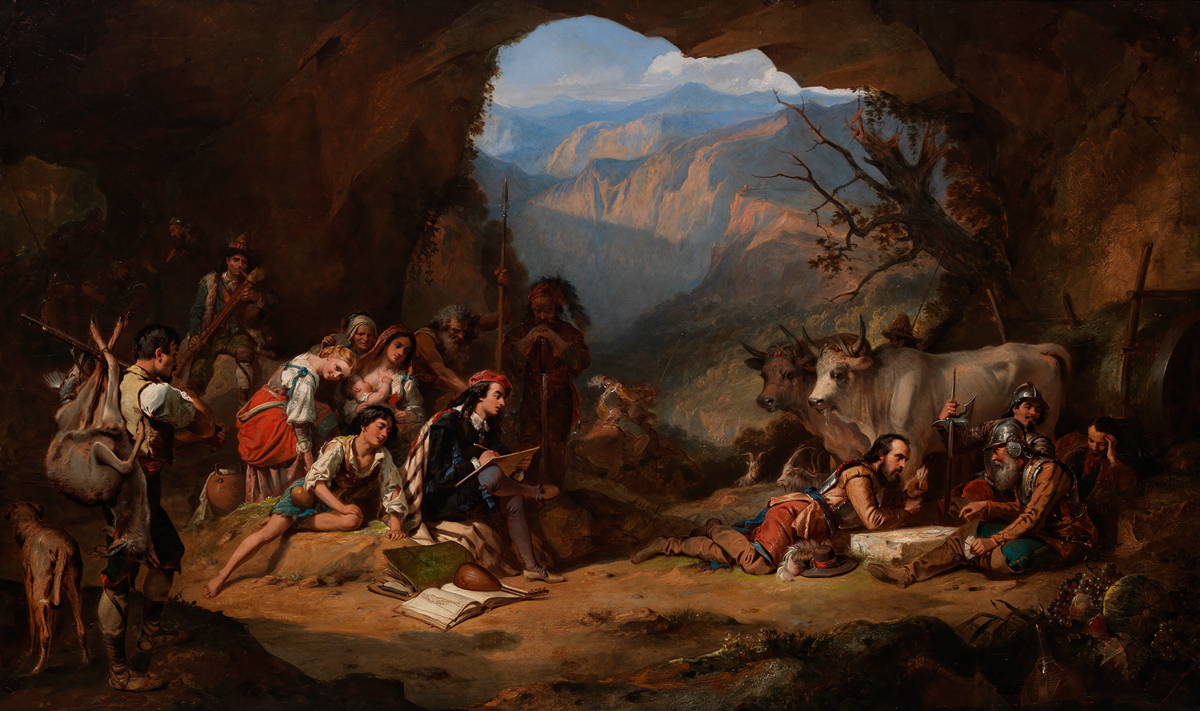
- Artist: Thomas Jones Barker
- Year: 1865
- Type: Oil on canvas, history painting
- Dimensions: 111.7 cm × 183.1 cm (44.0 in × 72.1 in)
- Location: Joslyn Art Museum; Omaha

The Studio of Salvator Rosa in the Mountains of the Abruzzi is an 1865 history painting by the British artist Thomas Jones Barker. It features a scene inspired by the myth that the Italian Baroque artist Salvator Rosa had been captured by bandits in his youth and loved amongst them in the Abruzzo mountains using their secret hideout as an art studio. Produced amidst the context of the ongoing Risorgimento, it reflects the still significant Romantic style. Barker had originally trained in France under Horace Vernet before returning to become a popular artist in Victorian Britain.

The painting was displayed at the Royal Academy Exhibition of 1865 held at the National Gallery in London. Today the work is in the collection of the Joslyn Art Museum in Omaha, Nebraska, which acquired it in 1985.

== Bibliography ==
- Aurnhammer, Achim (ed.) Salvator Rosa in Deutschland: Studien zu seiner Rezeption in Kunst, Literatur und Musik. Rombach, 2008.
- Clifton, James (ed.) A Portrait of the Artist, 1525-1825: Prints from the Collection of the Sarah Campbell Blaffer Foundation. Museum of Fine Arts, Houston, 2005.
