= Connoisseur (Hi-Fi) =

Connoisseur was the brand name of the products manufactured by the British manufacturer of Hi-Fi Equipment Sugden and Co Ltd, more particularly turntables.
