= Broken Vows (painting) =

Painting by Philip Hermogenes Calderon

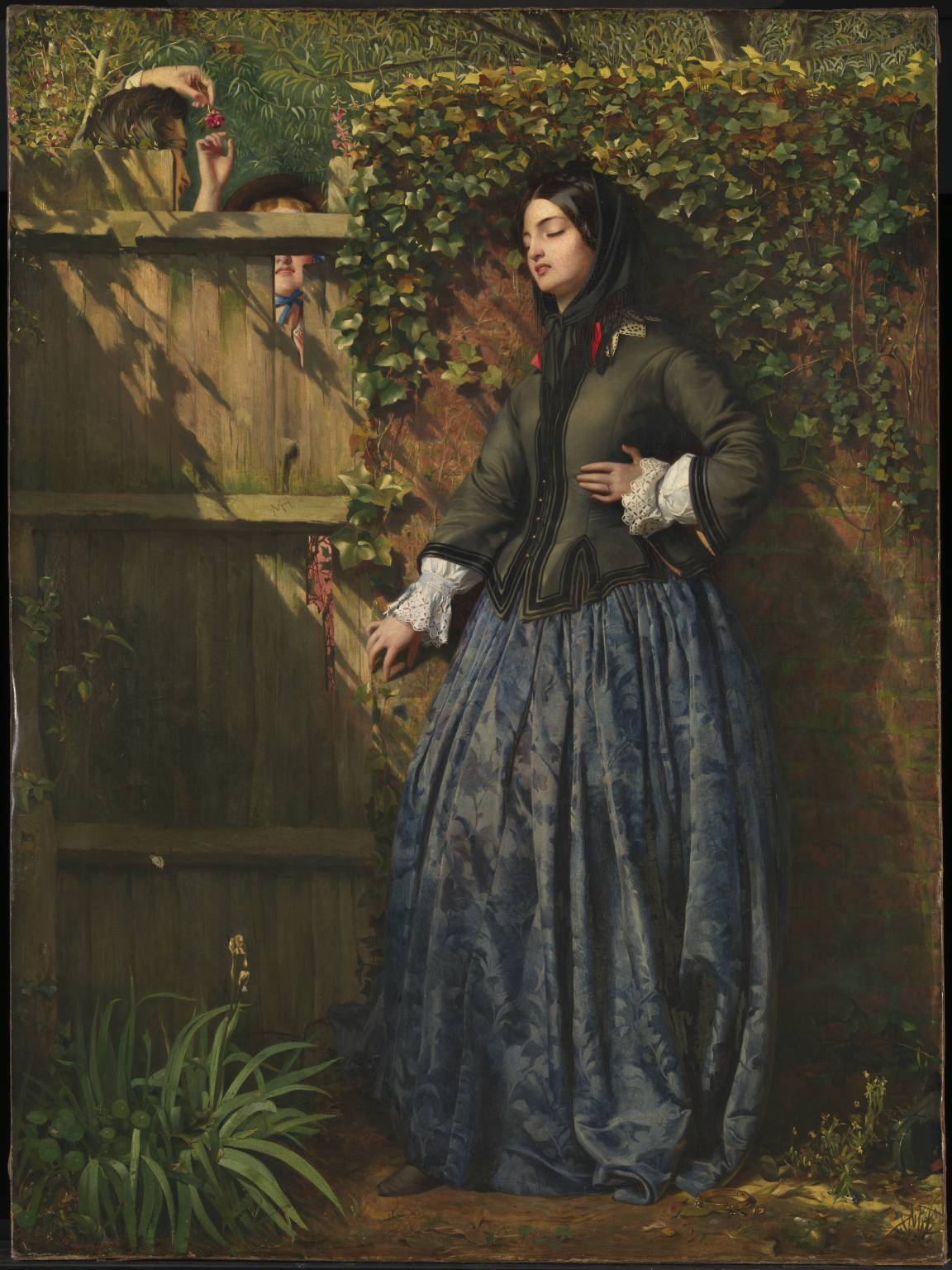
- Artist: Philip Hermogenes Calderon
- Year: 1856
- Type: Oil on canvas, genre painting
- Dimensions: 91.4 cm × 67.9 cm (36.0 in × 26.7 in)
- Location: Tate Britain, London

Broken Vows is an 1856 oil painting by the British artist Philip Hermogenes Calderon. It depicts a distraught young woman who has just made the crushing discovery that her beloved is being unfaithful to her with another woman. The couple are glimpsed the other side of a fence as he offers her a rose bud. The painting is filled with many of the symbols of disappointed love including a discarded necklace and dying flowers. The painting was displayed at the Royal Academy Exhibition of 1857 at the National Gallery in London. It is now in the collection of the Tate Britain, having been purchased in 1947.

== Bibliography ==
- Kern, Stephen. The Culture of Love: Victorians to Moderns. Harvard University Press, 1992.
- Meisel, Martin. Realizations: Narrative, Pictorial, and Theatrical Arts in Nineteenth-Century England. Princeton University Press, 2014.
