= Portrait of Countess Karoly =

Painting by Gustave Courbet

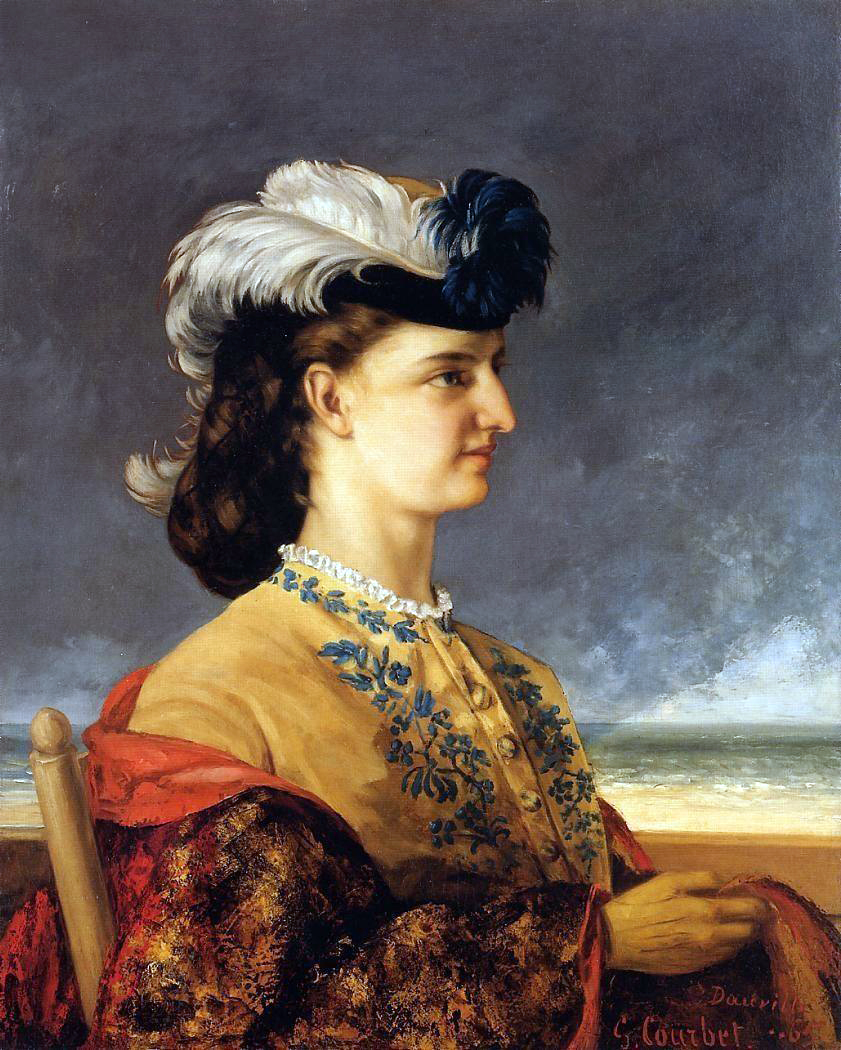
- Portrait of Countess Karoly
- Artist: Gustave Courbet
- Year: 1865
- Medium: Oil on canvas
- Dimensions: 32.1 cm × 25.8 cm (12.6 in × 10.2 in)
- Owner: Private collection

Portrait of Countess Karoly is an oil-on-canvas painting by French realist painter Gustave Courbet, created in 1865.

It was sold for $717,500 on 5 May 1998 at Christie's.
