= The Connoisseurs =

Painting by Edwin Landseer

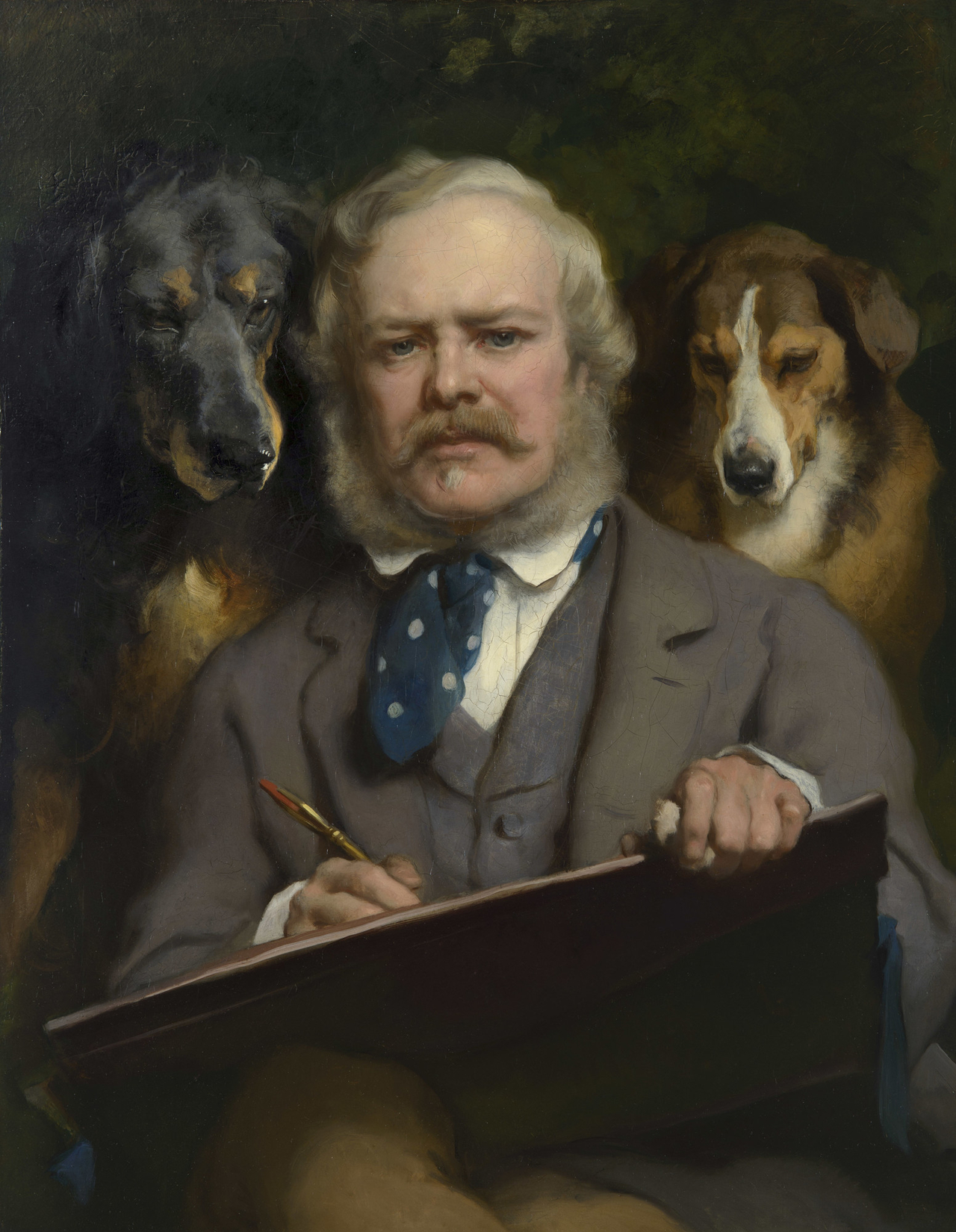
- Artist: Edwin Landseer
- Year: 1865
- Type: Oil on canvas, portrait
- Dimensions: 235 cm × 183 cm (92.4 in × 72.1 in)
- Location: Royal Collection

The Connoisseurs is an 1865 oil painting by the British artist Edwin Landseer. It features a self portrait of Landseer, then in his early sixties, with two dogs looking over his shoulder judgmentally as he works. It is also known by the alternative title Portrait of the Artist with Two Dogs

Landseer was a noted animal painter who had enjoyed decades of commissions from Queen Victoria and the royal family. A prodigy during the Regency era, he became a prominent figure of the art establishment. He was elected to the presidency of the Royal Academy but turned the position down. The painting was displayed at the Royal Academy Exhibition of 1865 at the National Gallery in London. He presented this particular work to Edward, Prince of Wales in 1868. It remains in the Royal Collection today.

== Bibliography ==
- Donald, Diana. Picturing Animals in Britain, 1750-1850. Yale University Press, 2007.
- Galinou, Mireille. Cottages and Villas: The Birth of the Garden Suburb. Yale University Press, 2010
- Ormond, Richard. Sir Edwin Landseer. Philadelphia Museum of Art, 1981
