= Philip Hermogenes Calderon =

English painter (1833–1898)

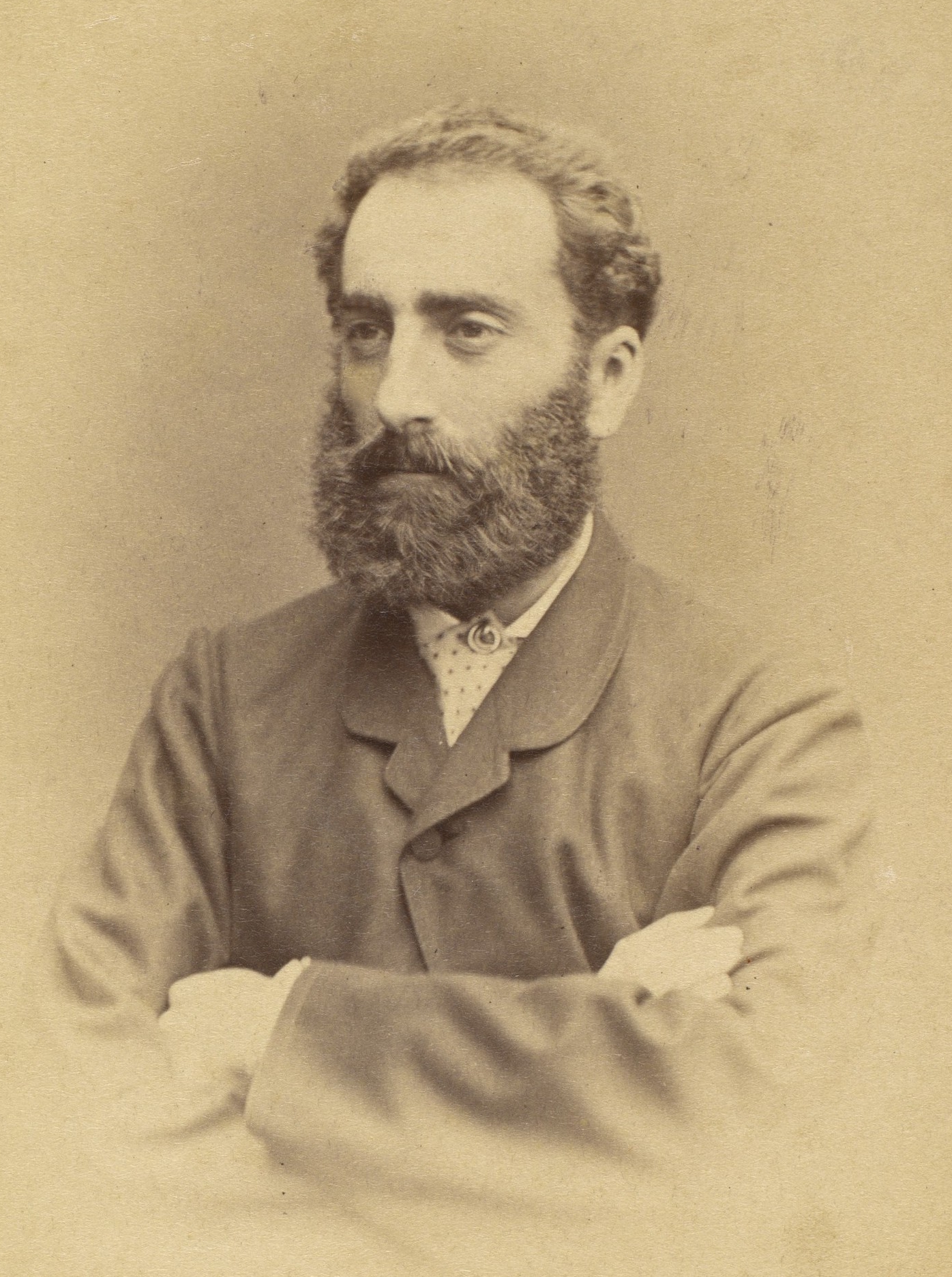
- Calderon in the 1860s
- Born: 3 May 1833; Poitiers, France
- Died: 30 April 1898 (aged 64); London, United Kingdom
- Occupation: Painter
- Children: William Frank Calderon; George Calderon

Philip Hermogenes Calderon RA (3 May 1833 – 30 April 1898) was a British painter of Spanish-French ancestry, who initially worked in the Pre-Raphaelite style before moving towards historical genre painting. He was Keeper of the Royal Academy in London.

== Life ==
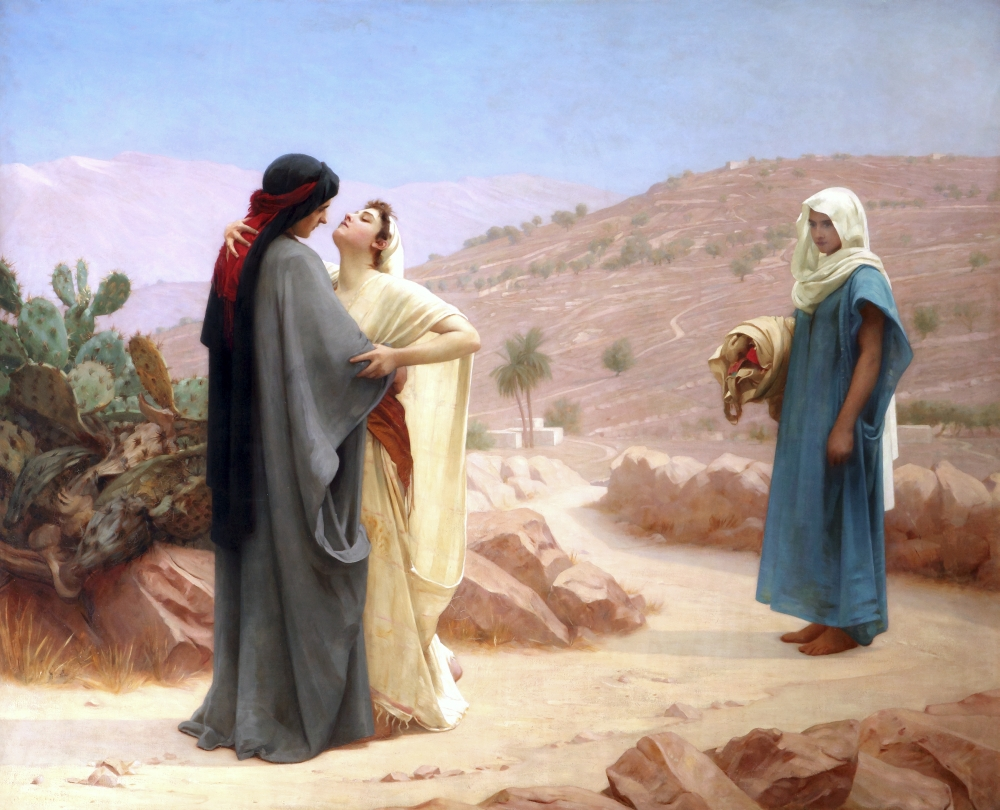
Ruth, Boas and Naomi

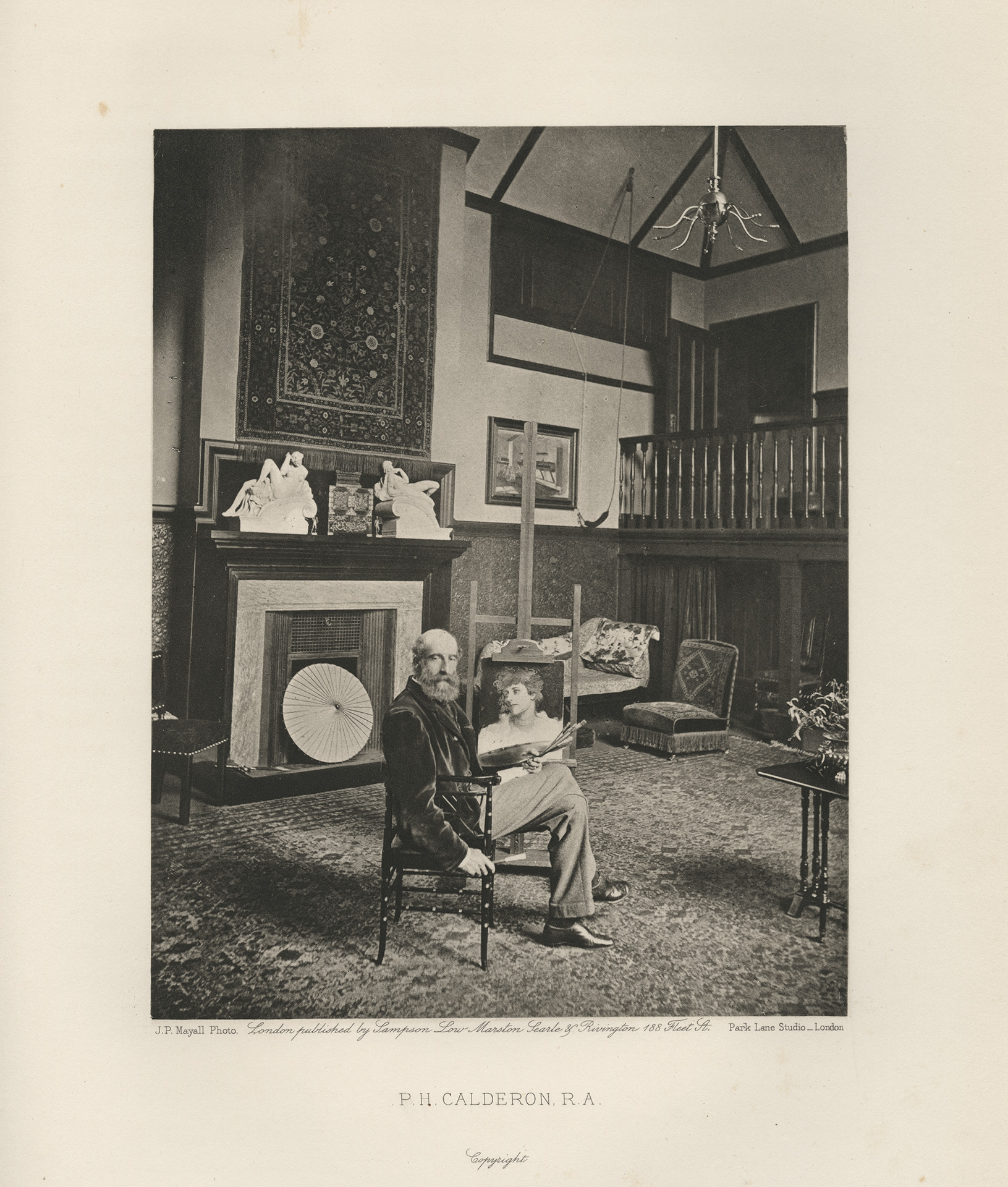
Calderon by J. P. Mayall from Artists at Home, published 1884, Department of Image Collections, National Gallery of Art Library, Washington, DC

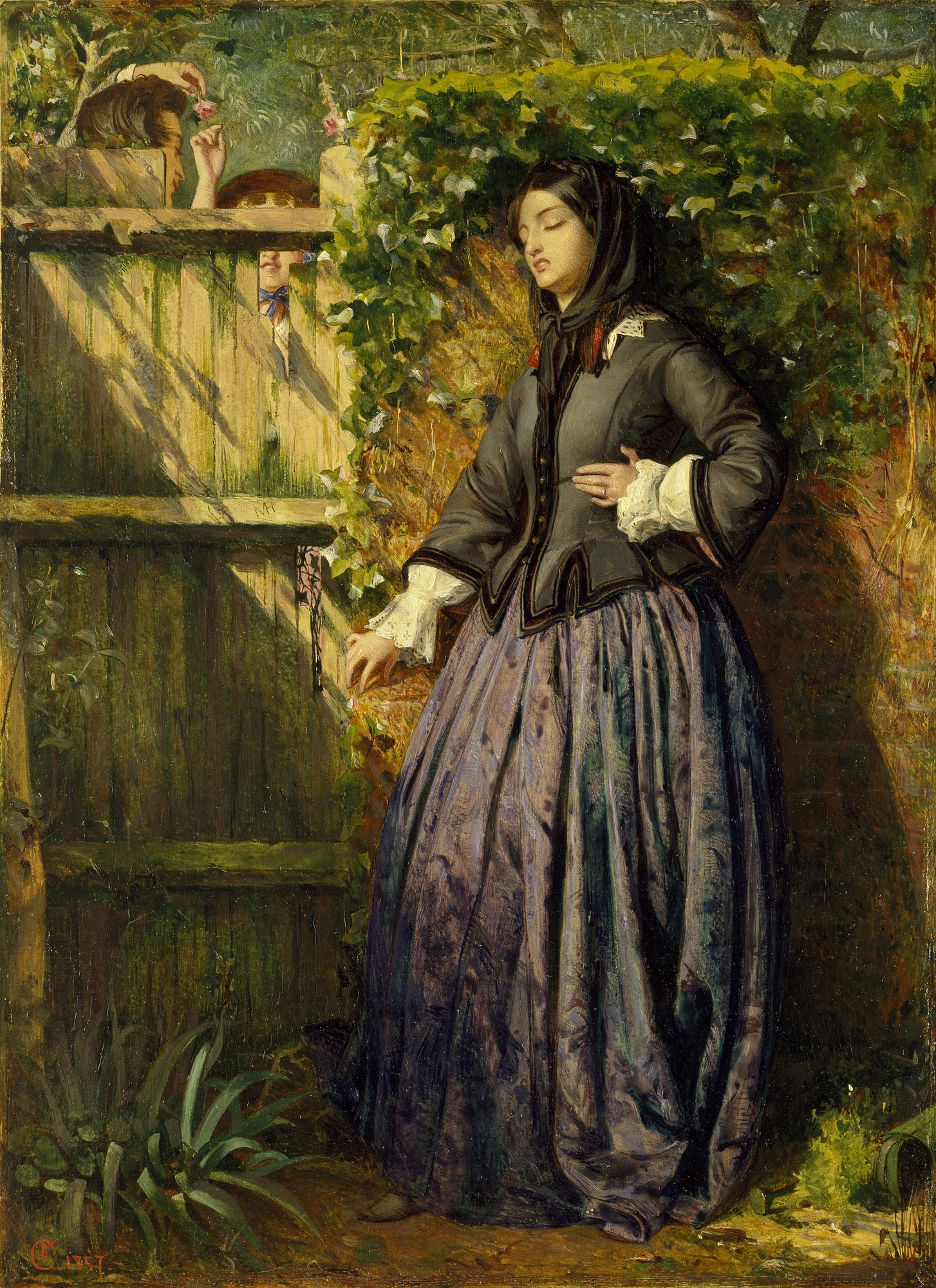
Broken Vows (1856; Tate Britain, London).

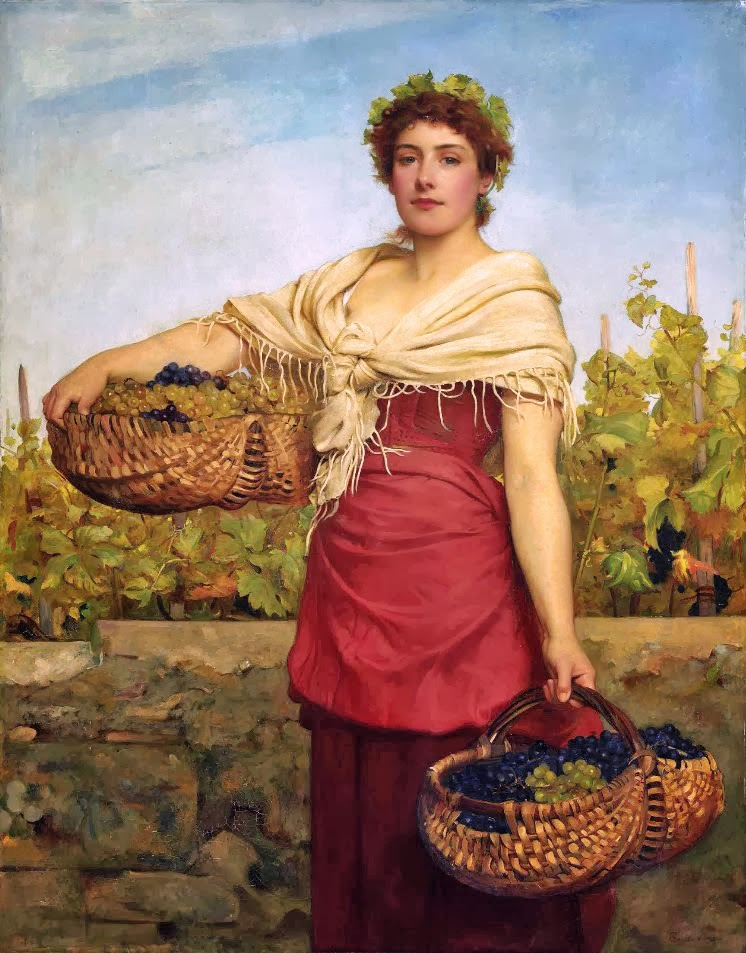
The Vine

Calderon was born in Poitiers, France. His father, the Reverend Juan Calderón (19 April 1791 in Villafranca de los Caballeros – 28 January 1854 in London) was a professor of Spanish literature and a former Roman Catholic priest who had converted to Anglicanism. Calderon planned to study engineering, but he became so interested in drawing technical figures and diagrams that he changed his mind and devoted his time to art. In 1850, he trained at Leigh's art school, London, then went to Paris to study under François-Édouard Picot in 1851. His first successful painting was called By the waters of Babylon (1852), which was followed by a much more popular one called Broken Vows (1856). From the beginning he was inspired by the Pre-Raphaelites, and some of his work showed the detail, deep colors, and realistic forms that characterize the style. The artist Henry Stacy Marks was his friend and brother-in-law, and Calderon exhibited his portrait at the Royal Academy in 1872.

Calderon became a leading member of the St John's Wood Clique, a group of artists interested in modern genre and historical subjects who were inspired, both artistically and socially by the Pre-Raphaelites. Historical, biblical, and literary themes were common in Calderon's later work. Many of his pieces show women wearing rich, silky clothing in gently colored landscapes. His Morning (1884) features a copper-haired maiden watching a sunrise.

His Juliet (1888) shows Shakespeare's Juliet seated on her balcony gazing at the stars. His later paintings adopt a more classical style, comparable to Edward Poynter, which resulted from his close relationship with Frederic Leighton, then-President of the Royal Academy. Calderon became Keeper of the Royal Academy in 1887, and from then on worked to support the teaching of anatomy based on nude models at the Royal Academy Schools. His 1891 painting Saint Elizabeth of Hungary's Great Act of Renunciation was secured by the Chantrey bequest for the national collection, and is now located in Tate Britain, but caused considerable controversy because of its perceived anti-Catholic message. It depicted the saint bending nude over an altar watched by monks.

== Works ==
- By the waters of Babylon (1852; Tate, London)
- 'Lord, Thy Will Be Done' (1855; Yale Center for British Art, New Haven)
- Broken vows ('More hearts are breaking in this world of ours, than one would say — Longfellow) (1856; Tate, London)
- French peasants finding their stolen child (1859; Private collection)
- The massacre of St. Bartholomew (1863; Private collection)
- Margaret (1876; Manchester Art Gallery)
- Morning (1884)
- Juliet (1888)
- St. Elizabeth of Hungary's great act of renunciation (1891; Tate, London)

== Gallery ==
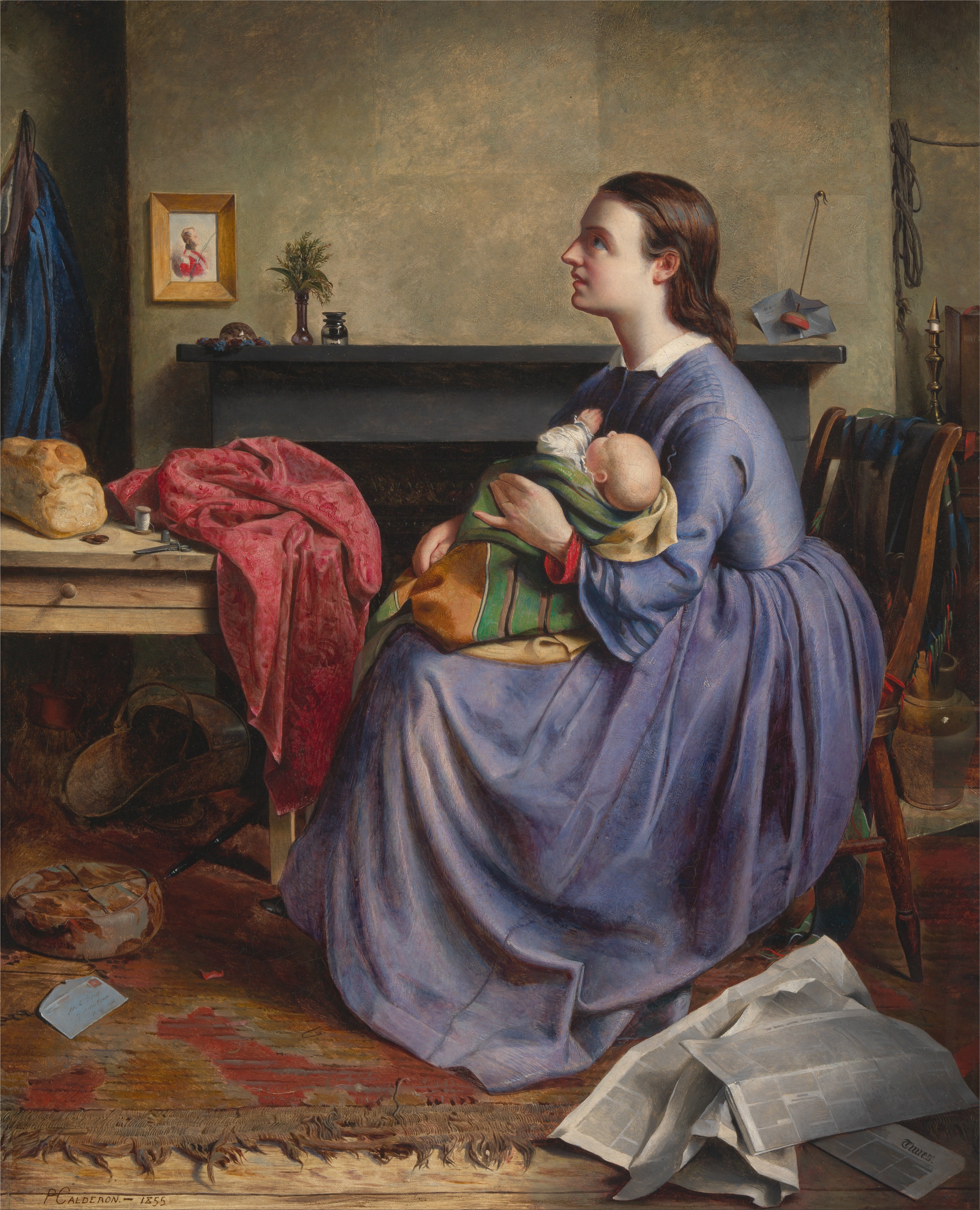
'Lord, Thy Will Be Done' (1855)

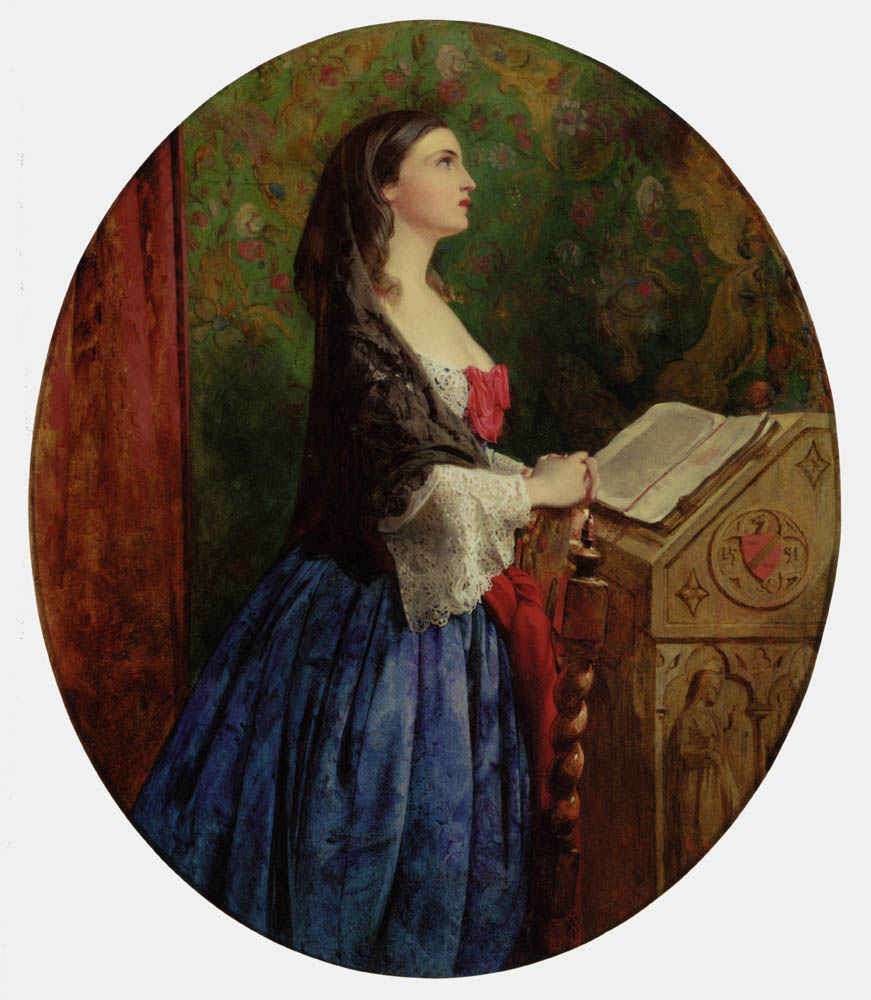
Ave Maria (1858)

Flora MacDonald's Farewell to Charles Edward (1858)

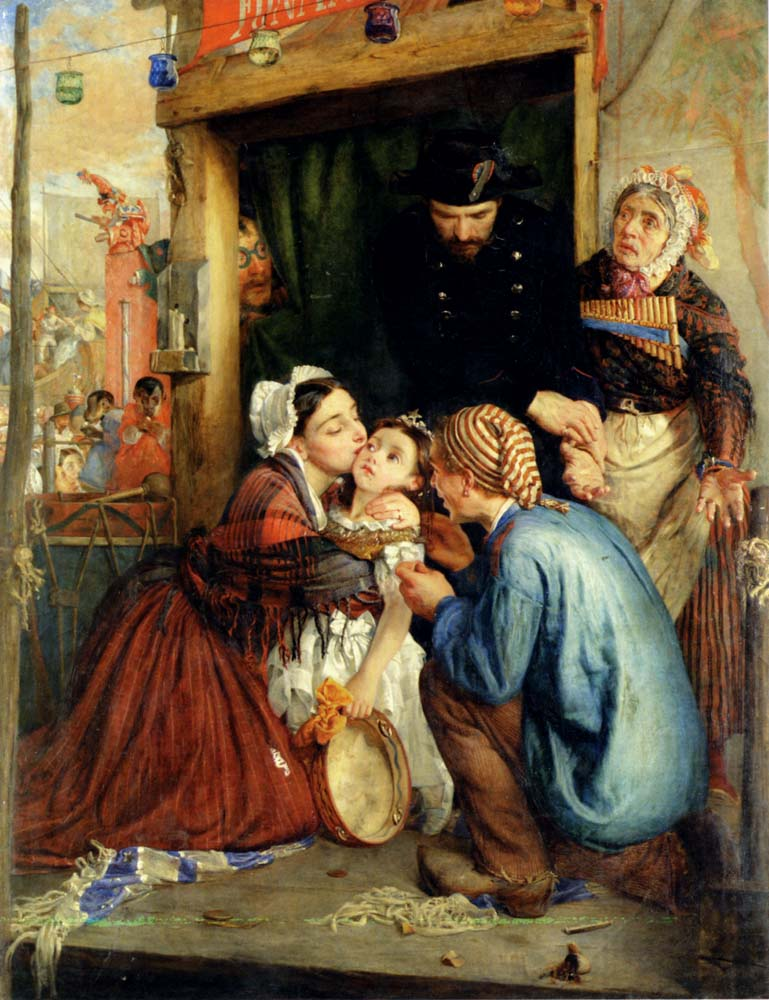
French Peasants Finding Their Stolen Child (1859)

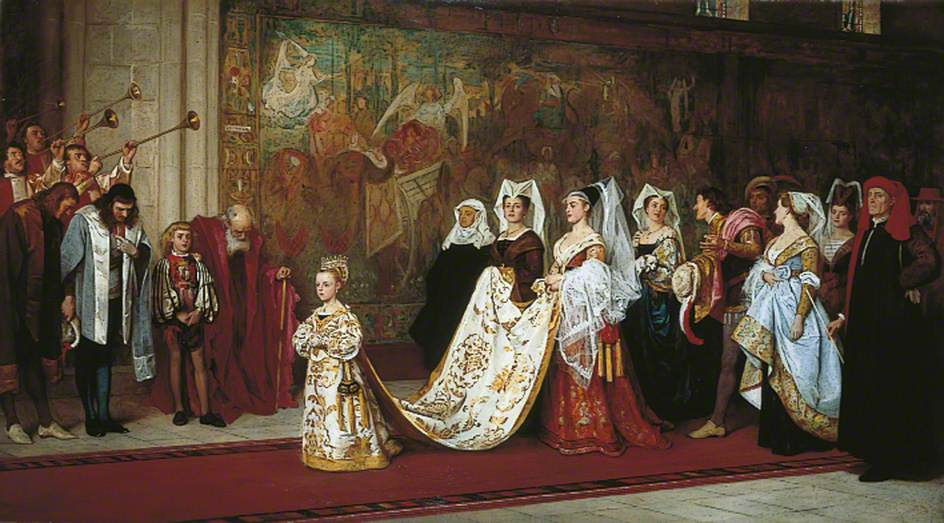
Her Most High, Noble and Puissant Grace (1865)

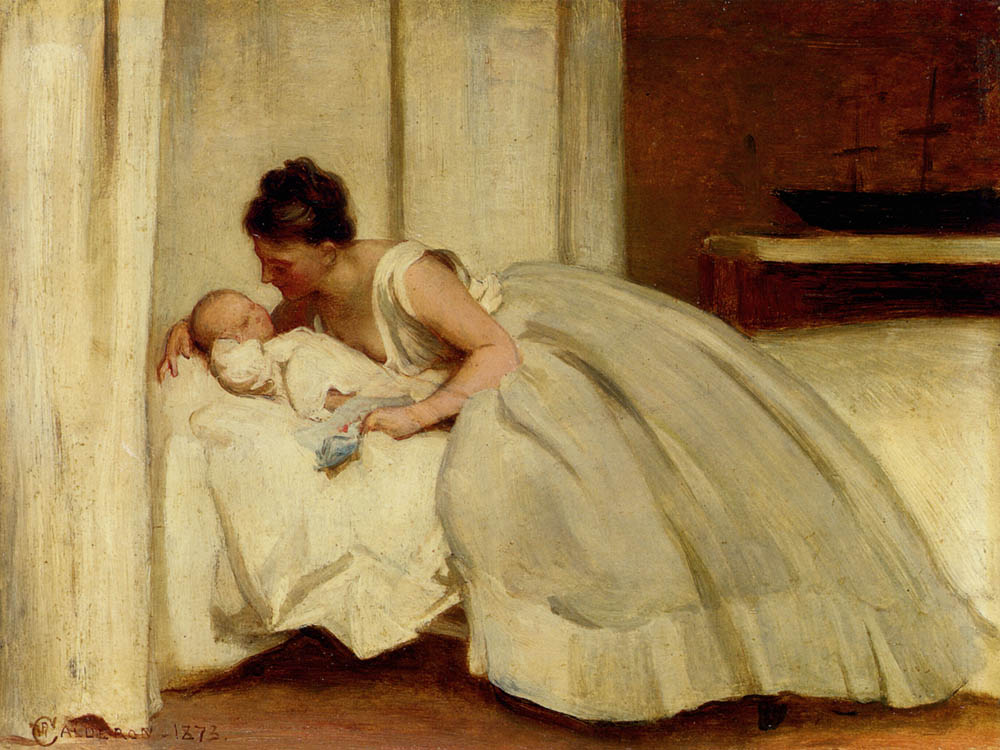
Letter From Daddy (1873)

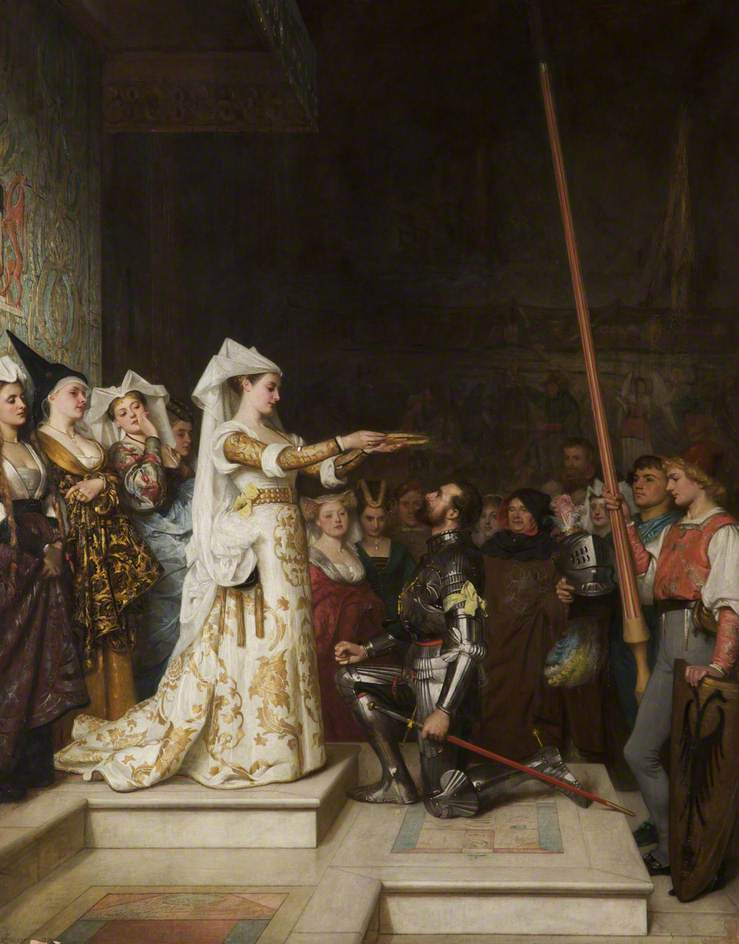
The Queen of the Tournament (1874)

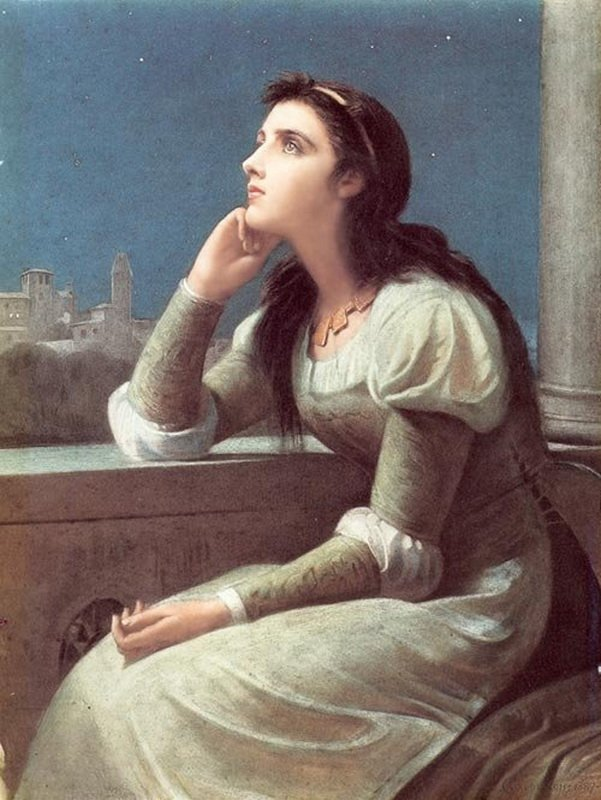
Juliet (1888)

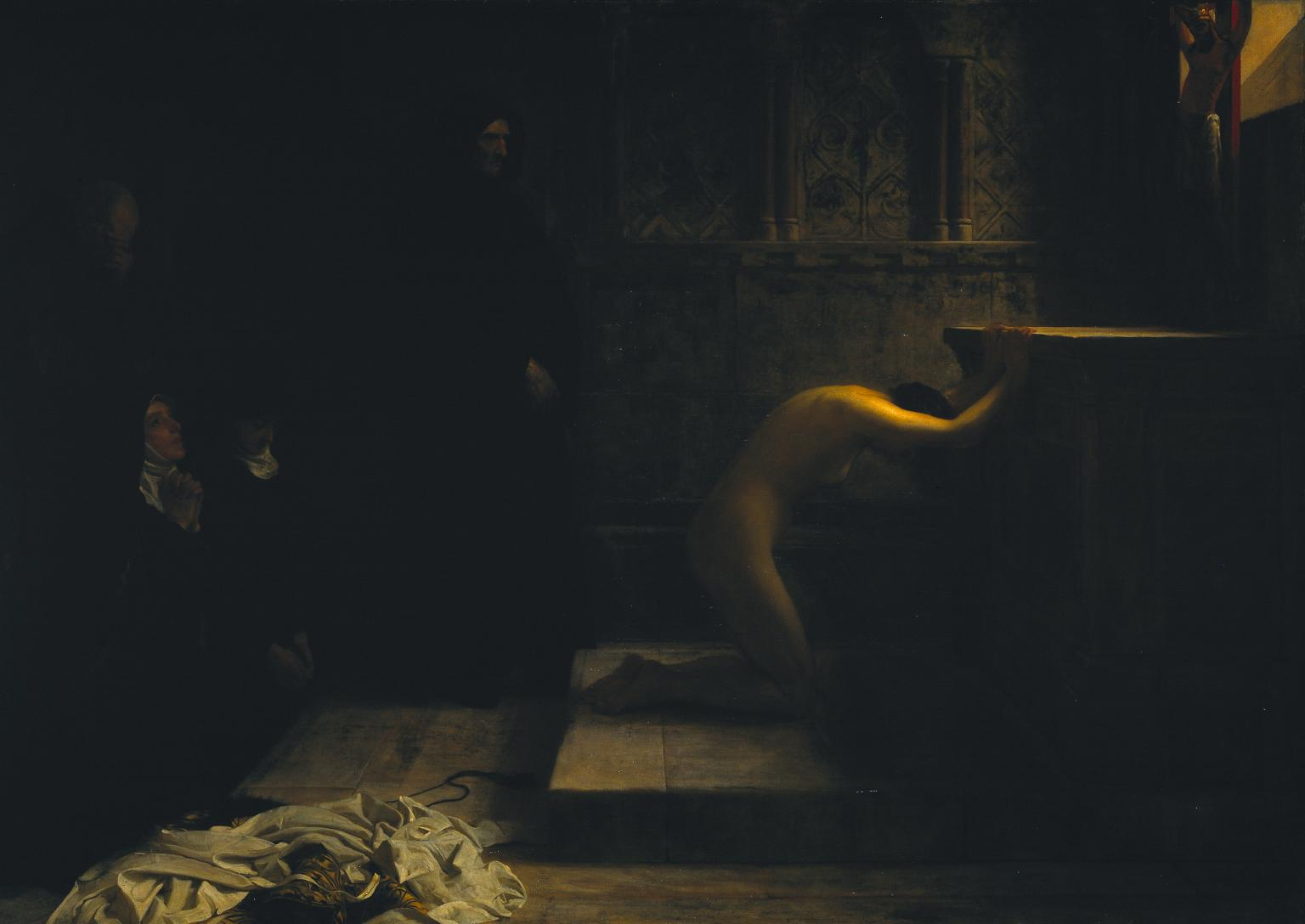
Saint Elizabeth of Hungary's Great Act of Renunciation (1891)

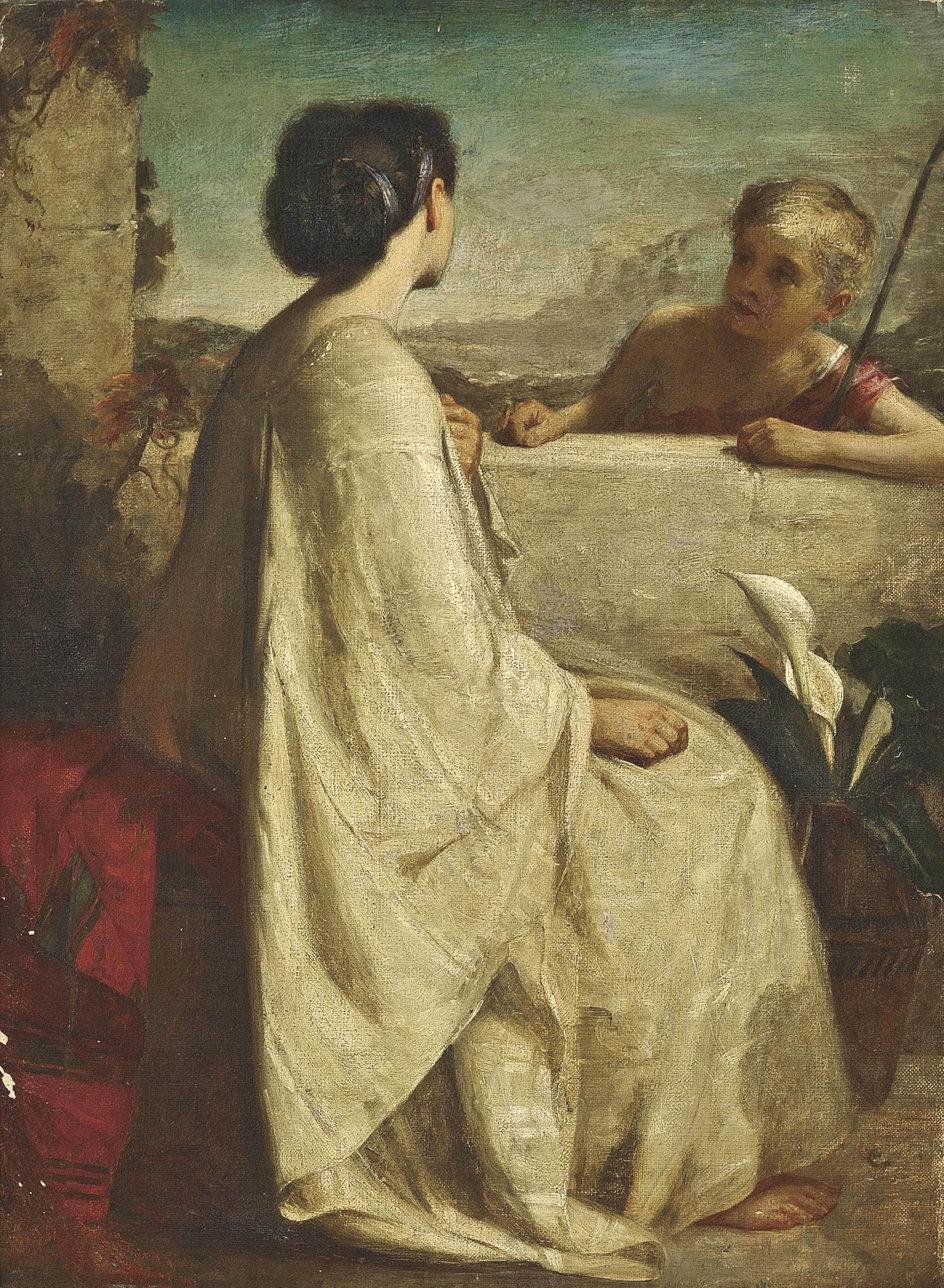
Mariana (scene depicts Act IV, Scene I, from‚ "Measure for Measure" by William Shakespeare.)
