= John L. Ballantyne III =

United States Army general

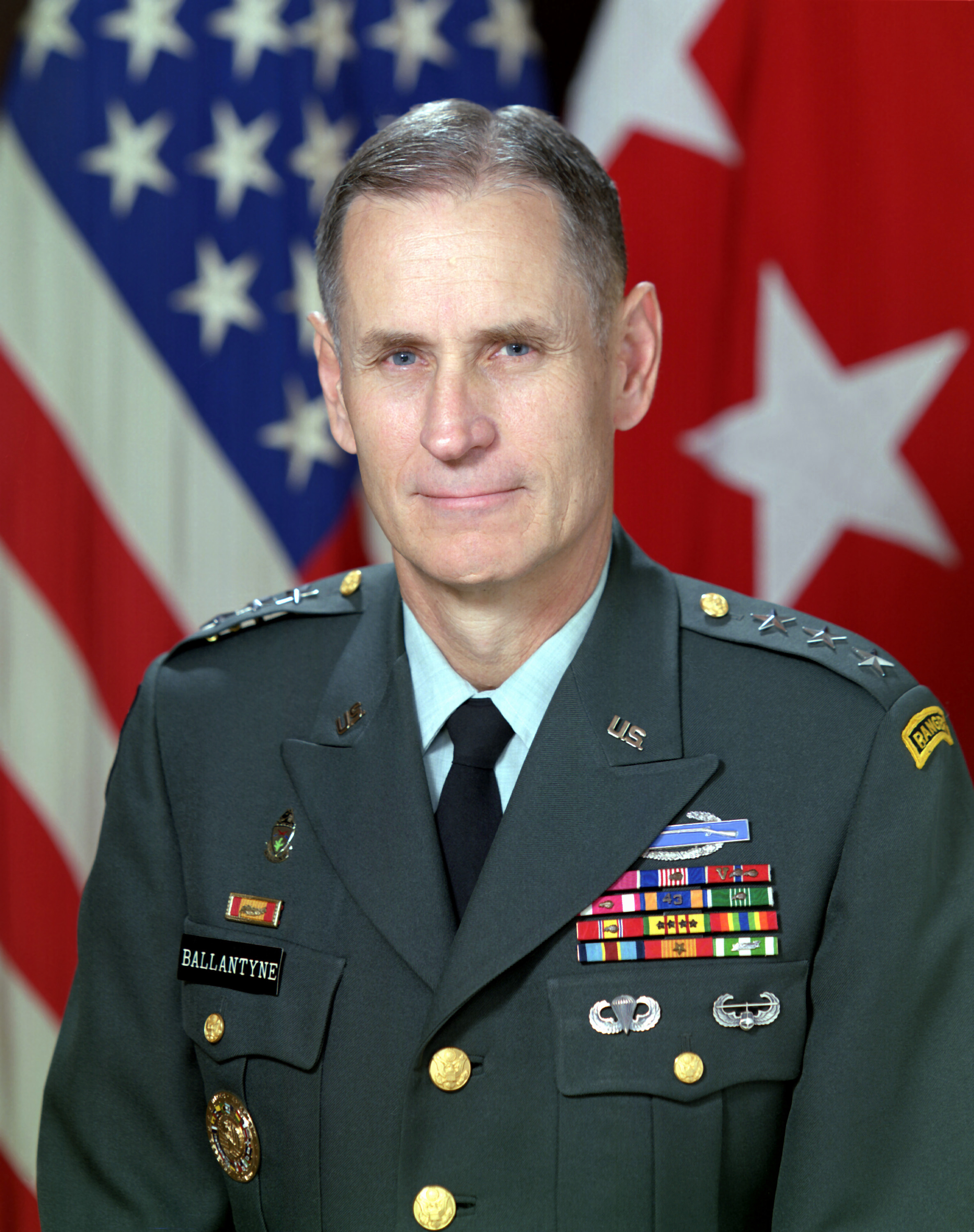
- Born: July 20, 1931 (age 95); El Paso, Texas, U.S.
- Military career
- Allegiance: United States
- Branch: United States Army
- Service years: 1949–1990
- Rank: Lieutenant General
- Conflicts: Vietnam War

John Lawson Ballantyne III (born July 20, 1931) is a retired lieutenant general in the United States Army.

Ballantyne is a 1954 graduate of the United States Military Academy. He later earned an M.S. degree in engineering mechanics from Georgia Tech in 1962.

In 1970, he commanded the 2nd Squadron of the 11th Armored Cavalry Regiment in Vietnam and, in 1974, was given command of the regiment in Germany.

He served as commander of the United States Army Military District of Washington from 1983 to 1986 and as chairman of the Inter-American Defense Board from July 1988 to June 1989.

Ballantyne was formerly a commander of a Combined Arms Operations Research Activity operation.

His military awards include the Distinguished Service Medal, Legion of Merit with Oak Leaf Cluster, the Soldier's Medal with Oak Leaf Cluster*, the Bronze Star Medal with 'V' for 'VALOR' device and two Oak Leaf Clusters, the Meritorious Service Medal with Oak Leaf Cluster, the Air Medal with awards numeral 43 and the Army Commendation Medal with Oak Leaf Cluster.

(* - two awards of the Soldier's Medal is rare, seldom noted)

His father, John Lawson Ballantyne II (January 13, 1898 – September 20, 1978), was a 1922 graduate of the U.S. Military Academy Class of 1923 who served in World War II and retired from active duty in 1946 as a colonel.

General Ballantyne is an Honorary Companion of the Military Order of the Loyal Legion of the United States.
