= List of art critics =

This list of art critics enumerates persons who had or have a significant part of their known creative output in the form of art criticism, which consists mostly of the written discussion and aesthetic evaluation of works of art.

== Scope ==
There is no official list of art critics, the compilation of which is compounded by problems in defining art criticism – not least of which is the overlap with art history, and philosophy of art. Herein will be included those authors that are mentioned as being art critics or producing art criticism in works of reference, as are encyclopedias, dictionaries or scholarly reviews.

According to one authority, art criticism, in a close approximation to the current sociocultural framework of the activity, started in the 18th century CE in Western Europe. However, many authors living before that time and outside that region of the world wrote on the subject of art and aesthetic experience, though using terms and concepts that may not have a direct translation into the lexicon of the Western tradition. These, when mentioned, will be included as well though pertinently noted.

== A ==
- Ansel Adams
- Qadi Ahmad – pre-18th century, non-Western
- Lawrence Alloway
- Antigones of Karystos – pre-18th century
- Guillaume Apollinaire
- Pietro Aretino – pre-18th century
- St. Augustine – pre-18th century
- Albert Aurier

== B ==
- Robert Balmanno
- Alfred H. Barr, Jr.
- Iris Barry
- Roland Barthes
- Geoffrey Batchen
- Charles Baudelaire
- Germain Bazin
- Monroe Beardsley
- Samuel Beazley
- Clive Bell
- Walter Benjamin
- John Berger
- Heinz Berggruen
- Olivier Berggruen
- Oswell Blakeston
- Franz Boas
- André Breton
- Osip Brik
- Benjamin Buchloh
- Clarence Joseph Bulliet
- Victor Burgin

== C ==
- Charles Caffin
- Dan Cameron
- F. Lennox Campello
- Maxime Du Camp
- William Paulet Carey
- Carl Gustav Carus
- Fernando Castro
- Germano Celant
- Jean-François Chevrier
- John Chandler
- Henry Fothergill Chorley
- Cynthia Chris
- Robert Coates
- Georges Cochet
- Charles-Nicolas Cochin
- A.D. Coleman
- John Coplans
- Douglas Crimp
- Benedetto Croce
- George Cumberland
- Allan Cunningham

== D ==
- Richard Dagley
- Arthur Danto
- George Darley
- Olivier Debroise
- David Deitcher
- John Dewey
- Erik de Smedt
- Thomas Frognall Dibdin
- Denis Diderot
- Charles Wentworth Dilke
- Regis Durand
- Edward Dubois
- Henry Bate Dudley
- Edouard Dujardin
- Théodore Duret

== E ==
- John Eagles
- Tomas Elsaesser
- James Elmes
- Hugo Erfurth
- Walker Evans
- Nissim Ezekiel

== F ==
- Sara Facio
- Anna Fárova
- Edmund Burke Feldman
- Ernest Fenellosa
- Carl Ludwig Fernow
- Filarete – pre-18th century
- Hal Fischer
- Étienne La Font de Saint-Yenne
- André Fontainas
- Hal Foster (b. 1955)
- Michael Fried
- Michel Frizot
- Roger Fry
- Tatsuo Fukushima

== G ==
- Theóphile Gautier
- Lorenzo Ghiberti — pre-18th century
- André Gide
- Antoine Joseph Gorsas
- David Green
- Clement Greenberg
- Guo Hsi – pre-18th century, non-Western
- Guo Ruoxu – pre-18th century, non-Western

== H ==
- Gustav Hartlaub
- Sadakichi Hartmann
- Benjamin Robert Haydon
- William Hazlitt
- Eleanor Heartney
- Dave Hickey
- Prince Hoare
- Fred Hoffman
- John Hoppner
- Robert Hughes
- Robert Hunt
- Joris-Karl Huysmans

== I ==
- Amelia Ishmael

== J ==
- Ian Jeffrey
- Jiri Jenícek
- Edward Alden Jewell
- William Jerdan
- Daudet de Jossan
- Donald Judd

== K ==
- Ilee Kaplan
- Mary Kelly
- Max Kozloff
- Hilton Kramer
- Rosalind Krauss
- Barbara Kruger
- Donald Kuspit

== L ==
- John Landseer
- Lucia Lendelova
- Claude Lévi-Strauss
- Lucy Lippard
- Lucian – pre-18th century
- György Lukács

== M ==
- Janet Malcolm
- André Malraux
- Elizabeth McCausland
- Edward Mayhew
- Vijayakumar Menon
- Ursula Meyer
- Catherine Millet
- Nikolay Alexandrovich Milyutin
- Octave Mirbeau
- Gilles Mora
- Robert Morris
- Thomas Munro

== N ==
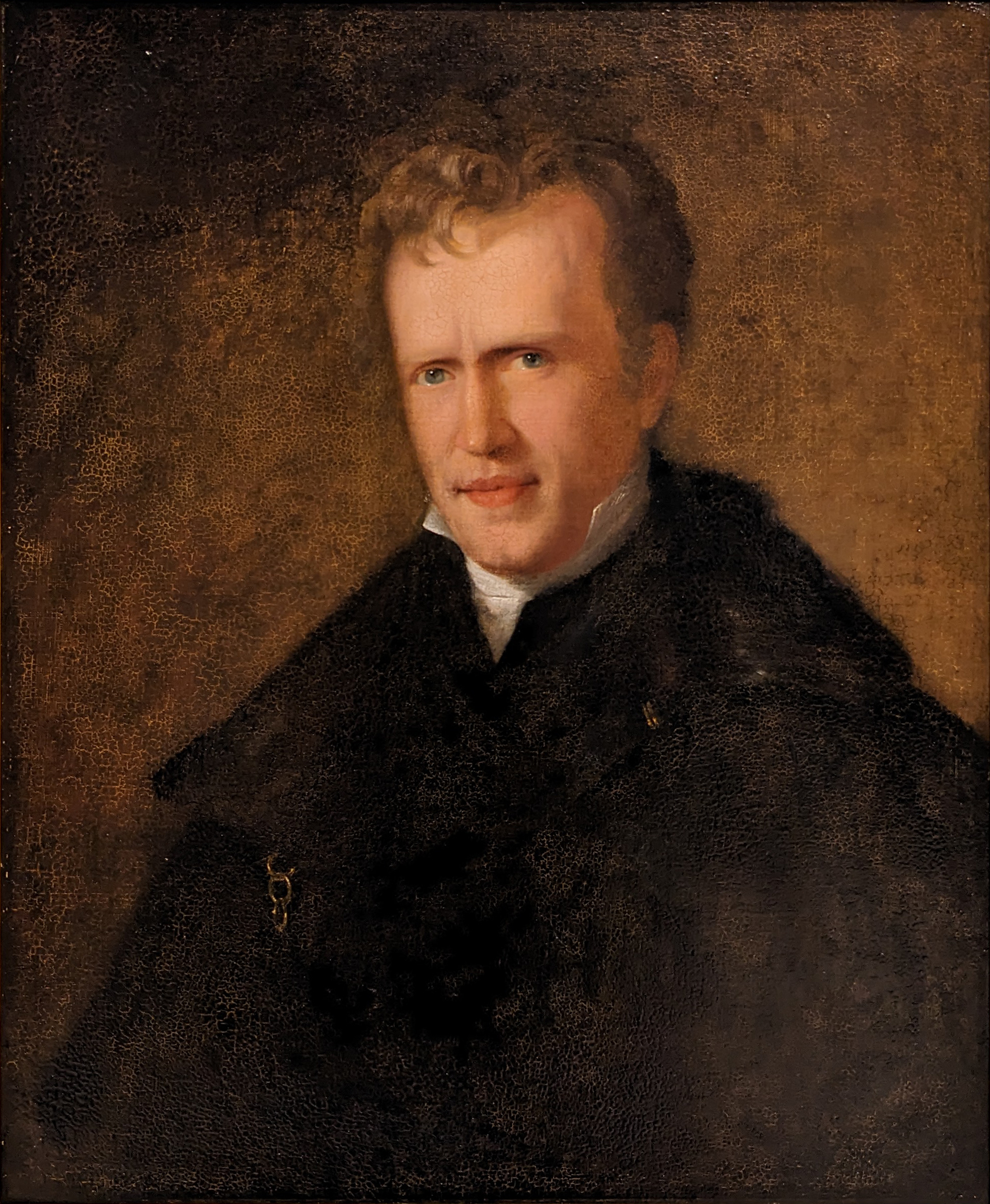
John Neal, first American art critic

- John Neal
- Barnett Newman
- Friedrich Nietzsche
- Bernard Noël

== O ==
- Jerzy Olek
- Craig Owens
- Martha Tracy Owler

== P ==
- Walter Pater
- José Pierre
- Plato – pre-18th century
- Nikolai Punin
- William Henry Pyne

== R ==
- Jasia Reichardt
- Antoine Renou
- Pierre Restany
- Jacques Rivière
- John Hamilton Reynolds
- Arthur Roessler
- Franz Roh
- Barbara Rose
- Jacqueline Rose
- Harold Rosenberg
- Robert Rosenblum
- Martha Rosler
- William Rubin
- John Ruskin
- Philip Rylands

== S ==
- Irving Sandler
- Elaine Scarry
- August Wilhelm von Schlegel
- John Scott
- Victor Serge
- Michael Seuphor
- William Sharp
- Willoughby Sharp
- Martin Archer Shee
- Viktor Shklovsky
- Ralph A. Smith
- Robert Smithson
- Rebecca Solnit
- Abigail Solomon-Godeau
- Susan Sontag
- Jo Spence
- Carol Squiers
- Leo Steinberg
- George Stanley
- Wendy Steiner
- Louis Stettner
- John Szarkowski

== T ==
- Catherine Taft
- John Taylor
- Tériade
- William Makepeace Thackeray
- Theophilus – pre-18th century
- Gene Thornton
- Calvin Tomkins
- Charles Traub
- Sergei Tretyakov

== V ==
- Giorgio Vasari – pre-18th century
- Marina Vaizey
- Louis Vauxcelles
- Carl Van Vechten
- Egon Vietta
- Paul Virilio
- Vitruvius – pre-18th century

== W ==
- Thomas Griffiths Wainewright
- Walter Henry Watts
- Francis Wey
- Oscar Wilde
- John Williams
- Deborah Willis-Kennedy
- Johann Joachim Winckelmann
- Stanislaw Witkiewicz
- Stanisław Ignacy Witkiewicz (Witkacy)
- Wilhelm Worringer
- Téodor de Wyzewa

== X ==
- Xenocrates of Sikyon – pre-18th century

== Y ==
- Yao Jui-Chung

== Z ==
- Marius de Zayas

== See also ==
- List of aestheticians
- List of critics
- List of painters
- List of philosophers
- List of sculptors
