= Renou =

Renou is a French surname. Notable people with the surname include:

- Antoine Renou (1731–1806), 18th–19th-century French painter and playwright
- Franck Renou (born 1973), retired French football defender
- Louis Renou (1896–1966), French ethnologist
- René Renou (1952–2006), French winemaker
