= David S. Rubin =

American curator (born 1949)

- Born: David Stuart Rubin; June 18, 1949 (age 77); Los Angeles, California, U.S.
- Education: University of California, Los Angeles (BA); Harvard University (MA)
- Occupations: Curator, art critic, artist
- Known for: curatorial work, writings, automatic drawing
- Website: davidsrubin.com

David Stuart Rubin (born June 18, 1949) is an American curator, art critic, and artist.

== Early life and education ==
Rubin was born in Los Angeles, California. He earned a Bachelor of Arts degree in philosophy from the University of California, Los Angeles, and a Master of Arts degree in art history from Harvard University in Cambridge, Massachusetts.

== Career ==
As a contemporary art curator, Rubin is recognized for thematic exhibitions, including Old Glory: The American Flag in Contemporary Art, It's Only Rock and Roll: Rock and Roll Currents in Contemporary Art, and Psychedelic: Optical and Visionary Art since the 1960s.

Rubin has held curatorial positions at Scripps College, Pomona College, Santa Monica College, the San Francisco Art Institute, the San Francisco Museum of Modern Art, Albright College, the Museum of Contemporary Art Cleveland, the Phoenix Art Museum, the Contemporary Arts Center, and the San Antonio Museum of Art. In 1996, Rubin served as the U.S. Commissioner for the Cuenca Bienal of Painting.

Rubin has organized solo exhibitions for Martha Alf, Robert Arneson, William Baziotes, Willie Birch, Douglas Bourgeois, Ellen Brooks, Peter Campus, Cynthia Carlson, Petah Coyne, Salvador Dalí, Jay DeFeo, Tomer Ganihar, Allen Ginsberg, David Halliday, Wally Hedrick, Al Held, Mark Kostabi, Donald Lipski, Christian Marclay, Ana Mendieta, Dennis Oppenheim, Martin Puryear, Alison Saar, Robert Stackhouse, Vincent Valdez, Carrie Mae Weems, and Emerson Woelffer. Rubin's curatorial archives are housed in the Archives of American Art.

As an art critic, Rubin has written for Arts Magazine, Art in America, Hyperallergic, and other art journals.

He has published numerous books and catalogs in conjunction with exhibitions.

As an artist, Rubin is known for automatic drawing. His drawings have been exhibited at the Blue Star Contemporary Art Museum in San Antonio, Texas; the Bradbury Art Museum at Arkansas State University in Jonesboro, Arkansas; and California State University, Northridge. His drawings are in the permanent collections of the Ogden Museum of Southern Art in New Orleans, Louisiana; and the Bradbury Art Museum.

== See also ==
- List of American artists
- List of American writers
- List of art critics
- List of Harvard University people
- List of people from Los Angeles
- List of University of California, Los Angeles people
