= Portrait of Arthur Wellesley =

Painting by John Hoppner

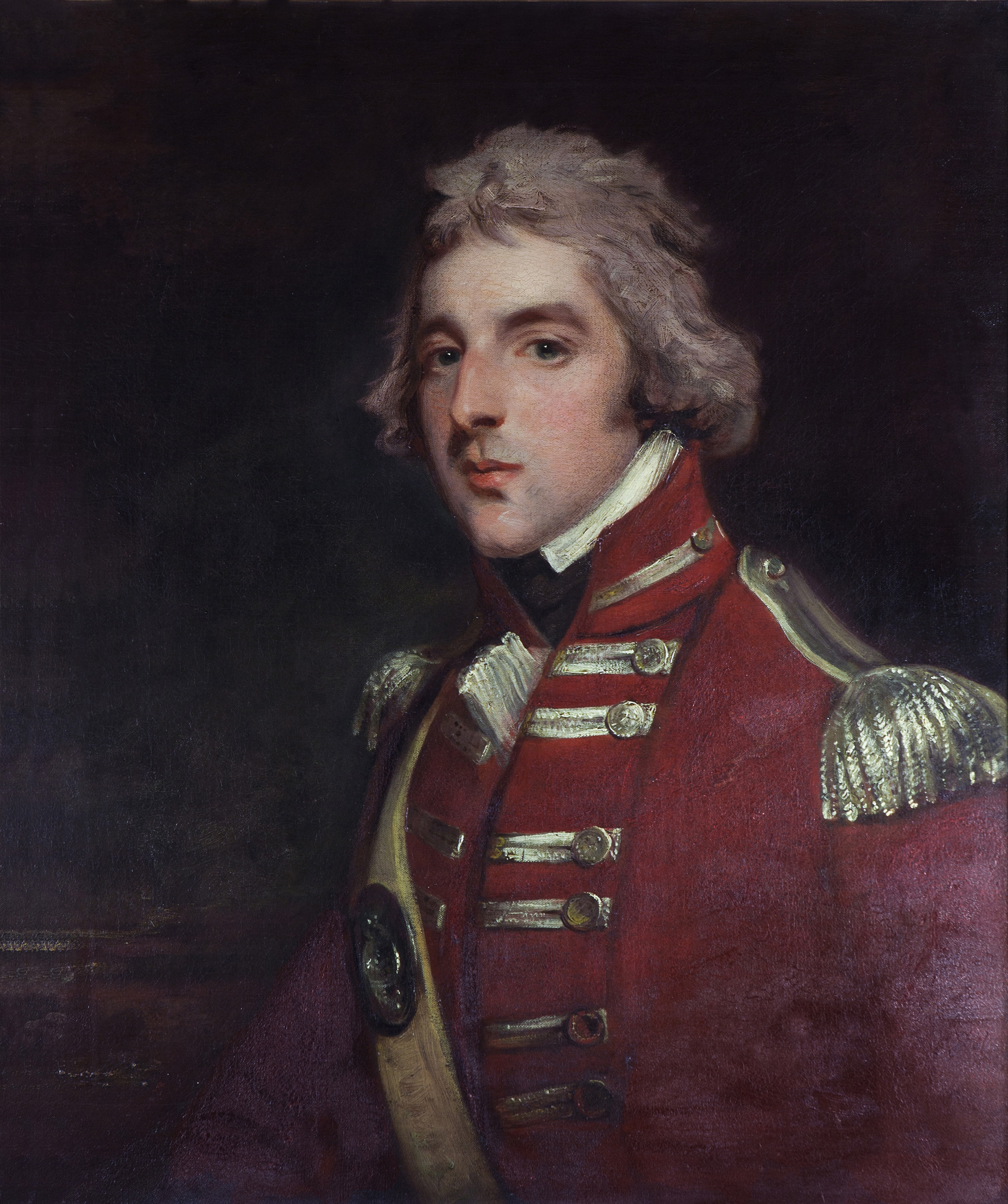
- Artist: John Hoppner
- Year: 1795
- Type: Oil on canvas, portrait painting
- Dimensions: 74 cm × 61.2 cm (29 in × 24.1 in)
- Location: Stratfield Saye House, Hampshire

Portrait of Arthur Wellesley is an oil on canvas portrait painting by the English artist John Hoppner depicting the Anglo-Irish soldier Arthur Wellesley. It was created in 1795.

== History and description ==
The twenty six-year old Wellesley was then lieutenant colonel of the 33rd Foot. Wellesley had recently returned from serving in the Flanders Campaign. He departed for India shortly afterwards where he earned fame for his victories, notably at the Battle of Assaye in 1803. Later he won a string of victories during the Peninsular War against France and as Duke of Wellington led Allied forces to success against Napoleon at the Battle of Waterloo in 1815.

Hoppner was of Bavarian parentage and also one of the leading portrait painters in late 18th century Britain. The work was likely to have been commissioned by the sitter's elder brother Richard, Earl of Mornington. This is one of the best-known images of the younger Wellesley, who was later painted many times following his success in the European War. Today the painting is in the Wellington Collection at the Duke's former residence at Stratfield Saye House, in Hampshire. In 1806 Hoppner painted Wellesley again following his return from India, this time it was a full-length portrait featuring his horse Diomed.

== Bibliography ==
- Muir, Rory. Wellington: The Path to Victory, 1769–1814. Yale University Press, 2013.
- Shaw, Matthew. The Duke of Wellington. British Library, 2005.
- Wellesley, Charles. Wellington Portrayed. Unicorn Press, 2014.
