= Portrait of Sir George Beaumont =

Painting by John Hoppner

- Artist: John Hoppner
- Year: 1803
- Type: Oil on canvas, portrait painting
- Dimensions: 77.5 cm × 73.5 cm (30.5 in × 28.9 in)
- Location: National Gallery, London

Portrait of Sir George Beaumont is an 1803 portrait painting by the British artist John Hoppner. It depicts the English landowner and art patron Sir George Beaumont, 7th Baronet. Beaumont was a key figure in the founding of the National Gallery in London, offering to donate sixteen of his own Old Masters if the government acquired the collection of John Julius Angerstein. He was also an amateur artist, regularly submitting landscape paintings to the Royal Academy.

Hoppner was a celebrated portraitist, although in his later years he faced intense competition from the younger Thomas Lawrence. Beaumont sat for this portrait at the urging of his friend Lord Mulgrave, but was dissatisfied with the result and preferred his earlier portraits by Joshua Reynolds and Thomas Lawrence. It was engraved as a print in 1808. The following year Hoppner displayed the picture at the Royal Academy Exhibition of 1809 held at Somerset House. In 1810 Beaumont and Mulgrave exchanged portraits as a gesture of friendship, and Hoppner's painting of Beaumont was swapped with one of Mulgrave by William Beechey.

Today the painting is part of the collection of the National Gallery, having been part of a large bequest by Claude Dickason Rotch in 1962.

== Bibliography ==
- Hamilton, James. Constable: A Portrait. Hachette UK, 2022.
- Hebron, Stephen, Shields, Conal & Wilcox, Timothy. The Solitude of Mountains: Constable and the Lake District. Wordsworth Trust, 2006.
- Skipton, Horace Pitt Kennedy. John Hoppner. Methuen, 1905.
