= Portrait of Lord Grenville =

Painting by John Hoppner

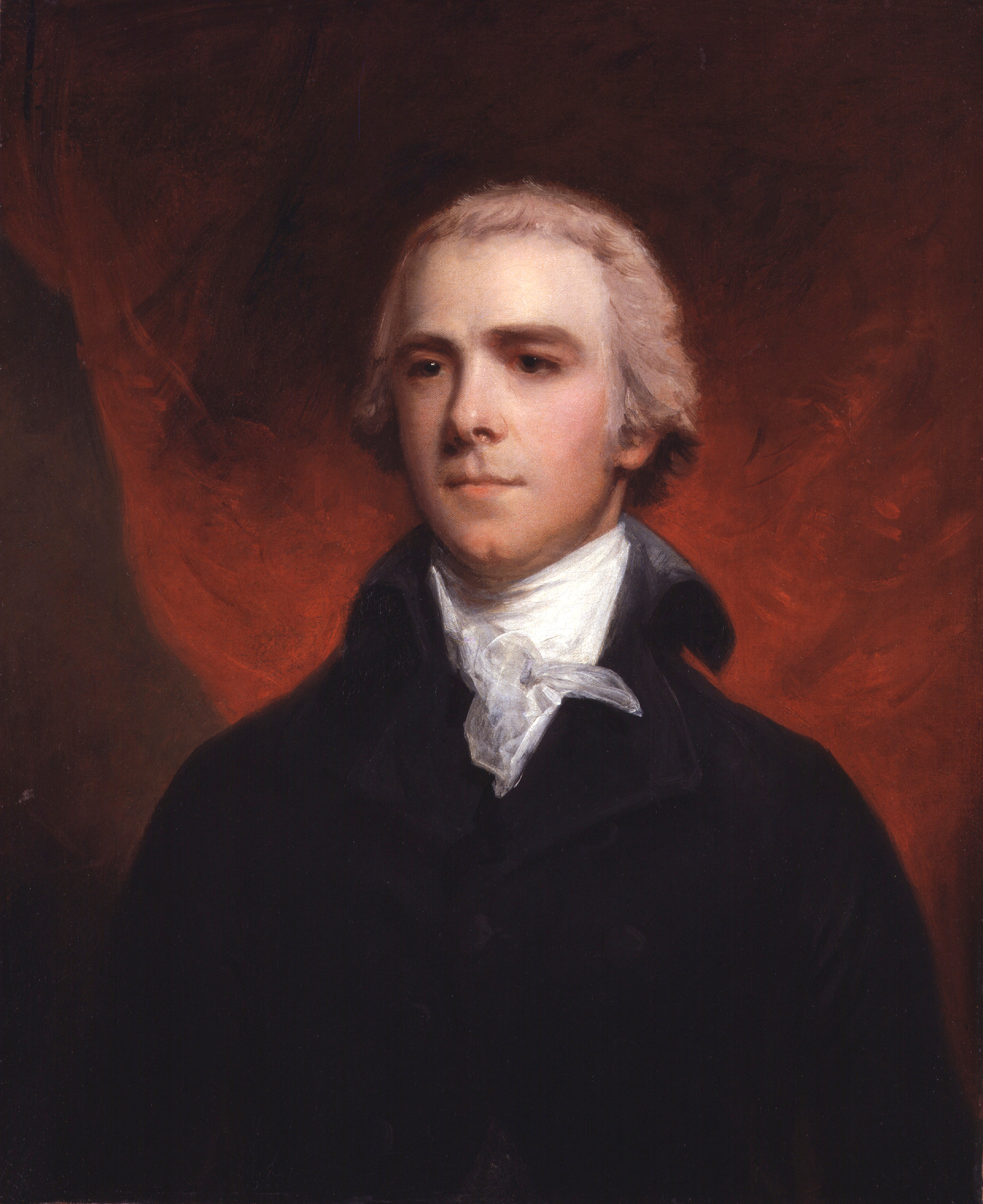
- Artist: John Hoppner
- Year: c. 1800
- Medium: Oil on canvas
- Subject: Lord Grenville
- Dimensions: 76.8 cm (30.2 in) × 63.5 cm (25.0 in)
- Location: National Portrait Gallery, London
- Owner: P. & D. Colnaghi & Co.
- Accession no.: NPG 318
- Identifiers: Art UK artwork ID: william-wyndham-grenville-1st-baron-grenville-156843

Portrait of Lord Grenville is an oil on canvas portrait painting by the English artist John Hoppner, from 1800. It depicts the British politician William Grenville, 1st Baron Grenville, later prime minister from 1806 to 1807.

The son of George Grenville, prime minister during the 1760s, Grenville was a strong supporter of his cousin William Pitt the Younger. He broke with Pitt in the early 1800s and joined with the opposition Whigs led by Charles James Fox. Following Pitt's death in 1806 Grenville succeeded him as prime minister, heading the Whig-dominated Ministry of All the Talents; however, this fell from power after thirteen months.

Hoppner was the London-born son of German-born parents and established himself as a prominent portraitist in Regency Britain. Today the painting is in the National Portrait Gallery, London.
