= Portrait of Anne Isabella Milbanke =

Painting by John Hoppner

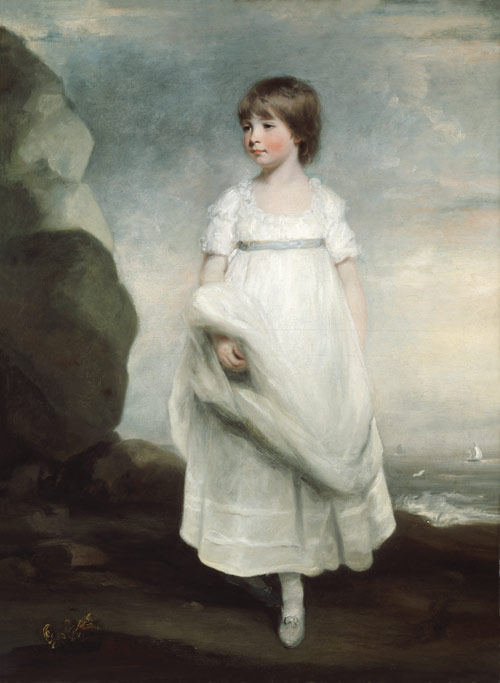
- Artist: John Hoppner
- Year: 1800
- Type: Oil on canvas, portrait painting
- Dimensions: 153.3 cm × 112 cm (60.4 in × 44 in)
- Location: Ferens Art Gallery, Hull

'Portrait of Anne Isabella Milbanke is an 1800 portrait painting by the British artist John Hoppner. It depicts Anne Isabella Milbanke, the daughter of Ralph Noel a wealthy County Durham landowner at the age of seven. The sitter was well connected from a line of the Milbanke baronets. Her first cousin Lord Melbourne later became Prime Minister. She became famous for her marriage to the Romantic poet Lord Byron in 1815. The marriage was stormy and they rapidly separated and lived apart until his death in 1824 during the Greek War of Independence. She was an active abolitionist and raised Ada Lovelace, known for her pioneering role in computing.

Hoppner was a leading portraitist of the later Georgian era and was an early rival to Thomas Lawrence who went on to dominate the Regency era. It was produced while the sitter's family were staying in London. The picture is now in the collection of Ferens Art Gallery in Hull, having been acquired in 1952.

== See also ==
- Portrait of Lord Byron, an 1814 portrait of her husband by Thomas Phillips

== Bibliography ==
- Elwin, Malcolm. Lord Byron's Wife. John Murray, 1974.
- Pierson, Joan. The Real Lady Byron. Hale, 1992.
- Skipton, Horace Pitt Kennedy. John Hoppner. Methuen, 1905.
- Wright, Christopher. From Medieval to Regency: Old Masters in the Collection of the Ferens Art Gallery. Hull City Museums & Art Gallery, 2002.
