= Douglas Bourgeois =

American sculptor and painter (born 1951)

Two Poets on an Island (Emily Dickinson & Rakim Allah), oil painting on wood panel by Douglas Bourgeois, 1991, Honolulu Museum of Art

Douglas Bourgeois (born 1951) is an American sculptor and figurative painter. Bourgeois has been called one of the new "visionary imagists".

== Life ==
Bourgeois was born in Gonzales, Louisiana and grew up in St. Amant, Louisiana. He received a BFA from Louisiana State University in 1974.

== Collections ==
Bourgeois' work is held in the following collections:

- the Frederick R. Weisman Art Foundation (Los Angeles),
- The Historic New Orleans Collection,
- the Honolulu Museum of Art, the Morris Museum of Art (Augusta, GA),
- the New Orleans Museum of Art,
- the Ogden Museum of Southern Art (New Orleans),
- the Smithsonian American Art Museum (Washington, DC), and
- the Southeastern Center for Contemporary Art (Winston-Salem, NC).

== Bibliography ==
- Arthur Roger Gallery, Douglas Bourgeois, New Orleans, Arthur Roger Gallery, 1994
- Bourgeois, Douglas, Dan Cameron, Estill Curtis Pennington, David S. Rubin and Jay Weigel, Baby-boom Daydreams, the Art of Douglas Bourgeois, New York, Hudson Hills Press, 2003 ISBN 1-55595-221-6
- Delehanty, Randolph, Art in the American South, Works from the Ogden Collection, Baton Rouge, Louisiana State University Press, 1996, p. 225.
