= The Literary Gazette =

Defunct British literary magazine

The Literary Gazette was a British literary magazine, established in London in 1817 with its full title being The Literary Gazette, and Journal of Belles Lettres, Arts, Sciences. Sometimes it appeared with the caption title, "London Literary Gazette". It was founded by the publisher Henry Colburn, who appointed the journalist and contributor William Jerdan as editor in July 1817. Jerdan wrote most of the articles and set the character of the magazine, and then became a shareholder and eventually the owner. He retired in 1850, and the magazine ceased publication in 1863.

The format of the magazine was always essentially the same, each issue consisting of about sixteen pages typeset in three columns. Illustrations were rarely included. The periodical would feature several book reviews, with the leading article being a book review occupying two or three pages. Feature sections included "Original Correspondence" and a social column as well as notice of theatre productions. An "Original Poetry" section consisted of work sent in by the public, the poets being called "Correspondents", as well as some work by staff writers. Advertisements filled the last two pages, which were used by publishers to publicise books. The magazine also occasionally featured news of subjects of interest such as archaeological discoveries, inventions, art exhibitions, architecture and the sciences. William Paulet Carey and Walter Henry Watts acted as art critics.

At its peak from the 1820s until the end of the 1840s, The Literary Gazette had unprecedented power and influence. While the reviewers in the influential quarterlies tended to write political tracts rather than describing the book they were supposed to be reviewing, Jerdan as a professional journalist had no interest in promoting political ideology, and his practice was to include extensive quotations from the book being reviewed. This reading material attracted a mass audience who also appreciated the weekly publication giving "a spontaneity which the monthlies and quarterlies could not acquire" and the low price of only eight pence, with circulation reaching four thousand copies a week. A favourable review in The Literary Gazette meant almost certain success for writers and publishers, but a mixed review could be disastrous.
