= Walter Henry Watts =

Walter Henry Watts (1776 – 4 January 1842) was an English miniature painter and journalist.

== Life ==
Watts was born in the East Indies in 1776, the son of a captain in the Royal Navy. He was sent to England at an early age and placed at school in Cheshire. He had talent as an artist, and devoted some time to the study of drawing and painting.

In 1808 Watts was a member of the Society of Associated Artists in Watercolours. He obtained some renown as a miniature painter, and from 1808 to 1830 exhibited miniatures at the Royal Academy of Arts. In 1816 he was appointed miniature painter to Princess Charlotte of Wales. Not being able for some time to make a living from painting, he found employment as a parliamentary reporter on the staff of The Morning Post in 1803. About 1813 he joined The Morning Chronicle in the same capacity. In 1826 he undertook to manage the reporting department of The Representative, but, returning to The Morning Chronicle in the following year, he continued to act as a parliamentary reporter until 1840.

During this time he also contributed criticisms on matters connected with the fine arts to The Literary Gazette, and edited the Annual Biography and Obituary from its beginning in 1817 until 1831. He was a co-founder in 1837 of the Newspaper Press Benevolent Association, and was its first chairman.

Watts died at his lodgings at Earl's Court Terrace, Old Brompton, on 4 January 1842.
