= Catherine Taft =

Catherine Taft is an art critic, curator, and writer. Taft has been published in Artforum, i-D Magazine, Modern Painters, ArtReview, Metropolis-M, Kaleidoscope Publishing, and multiple exhibition catalogs and artist books. She cowrote Part-Objects, an artist book for Scott Benzel that was published by Human Resources and Lockitch Press.

Taft was a Curatorial Associate in the department of Architecture and Contemporary Art of the Getty Research Institute in Los Angeles. She helped organize the Pacific Standard Time: Art in Los Angeles (2011).
