= John Hoppner =

English painter (1758–1810)

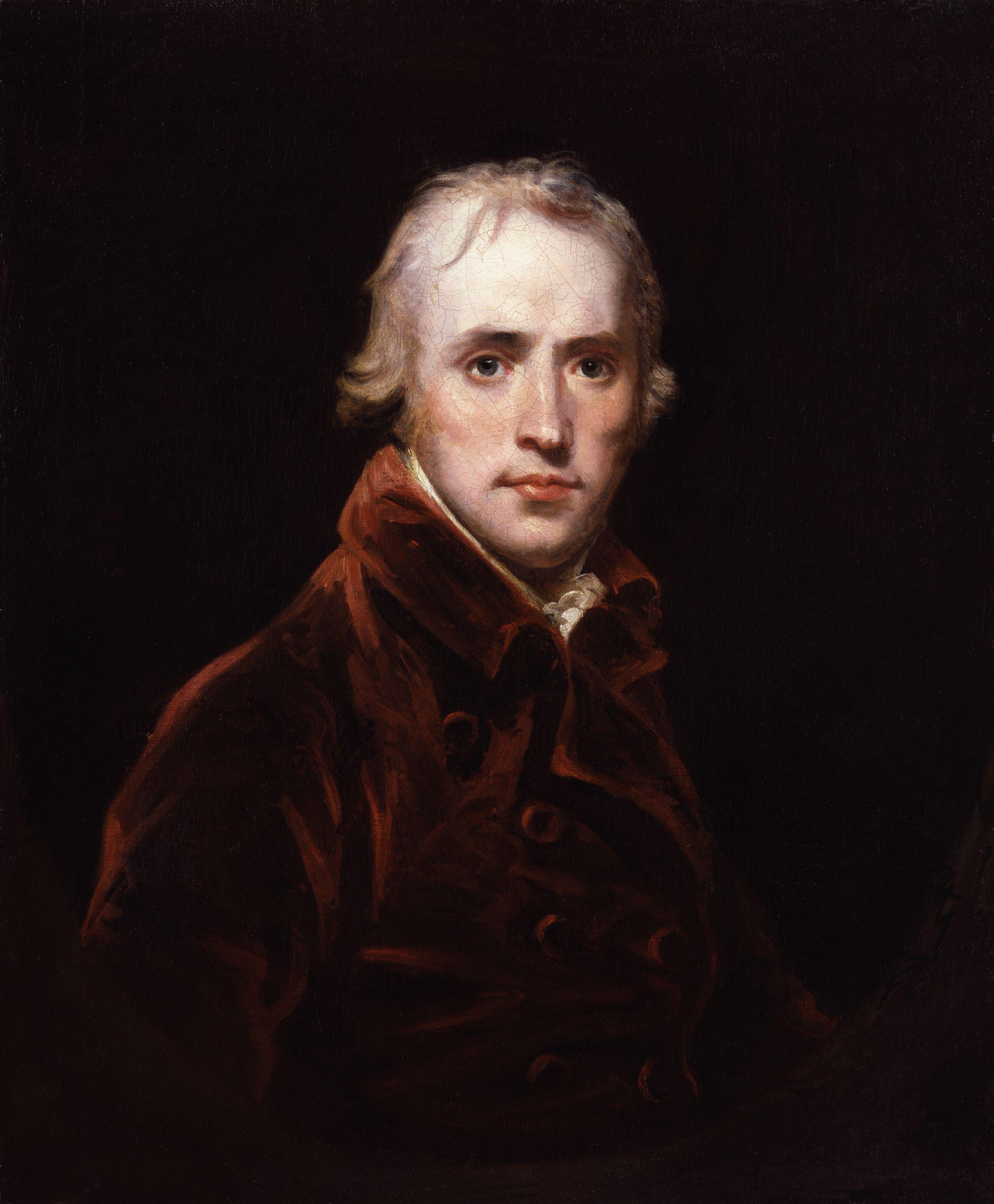
- Self-portrait, c. 1780
- Born: Whitechapel, London
- Baptised: 4 April 1758
- Died: 23 January 1810 (aged 51); London, England
- Known for: Portrait painting

John Hoppner RA (4 April 1758 – 23 January 1810) was an English painter, very largely of portraits. He was much influenced by Joshua Reynolds, and was regarded as a fine colourist. He had a successful career painting the high society of his native London, including the Prince Regent.

== Early life ==
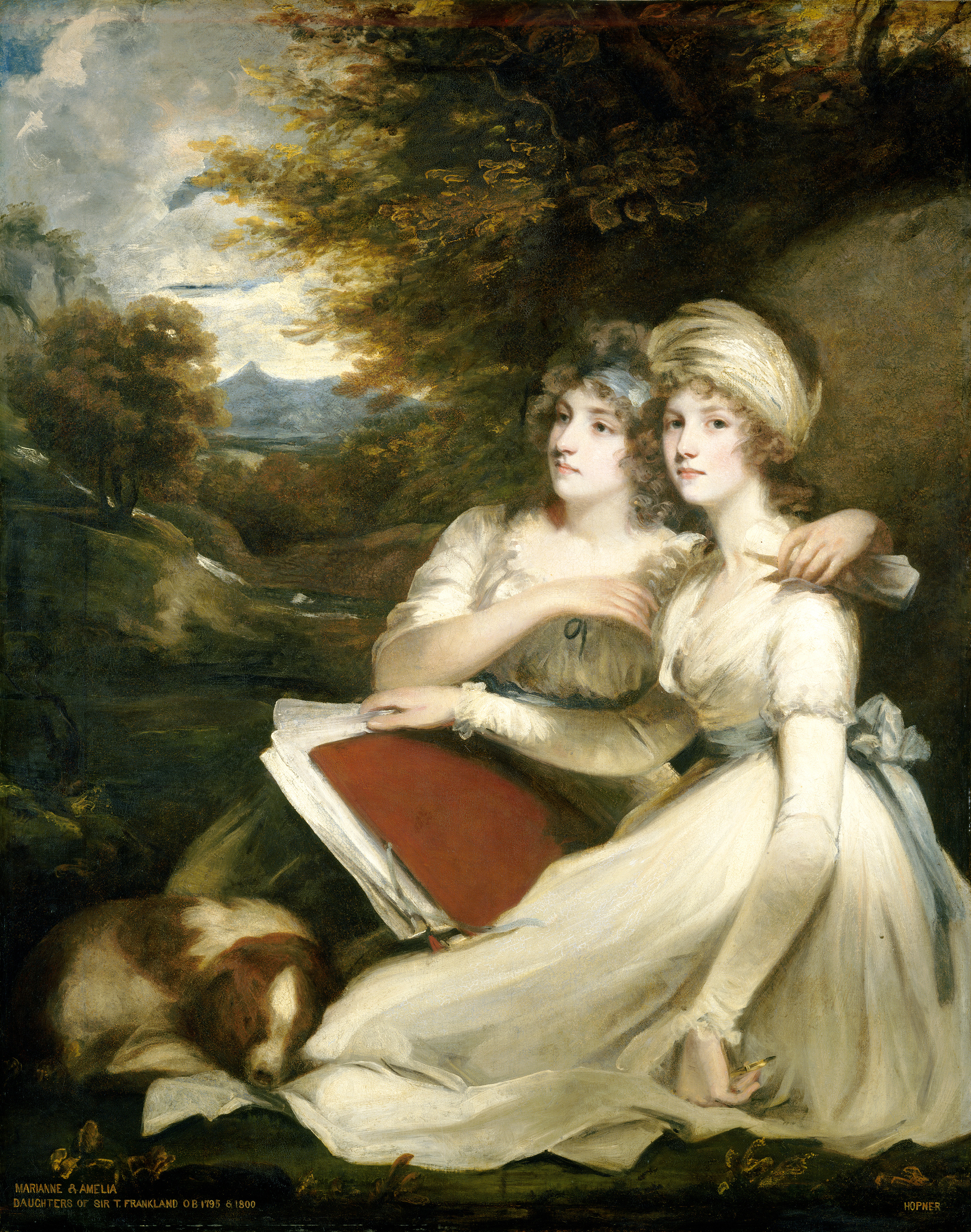
The Frankland Sisters, 1795

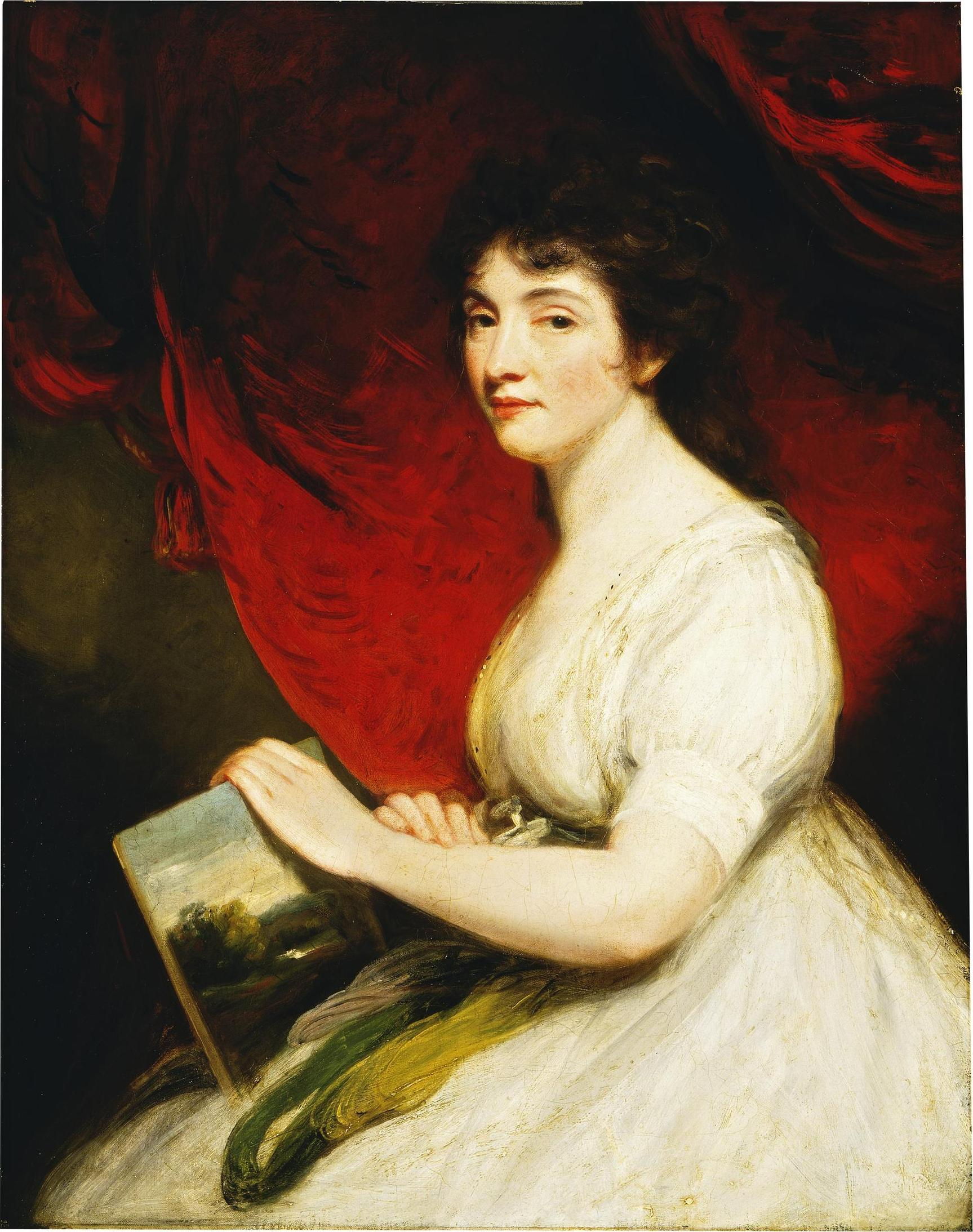
Miss Mary Linwood, about 1800, John Hoppner V&A Museum no. 1439-1874

Hoppner was born in Whitechapel, London, the son of German parents – his mother was one of the German attendants at the royal palace. George III showed a fatherly interest and patronage of the young boy that gave rise to rumours, quite unfounded, that he may have been his illegitimate son.

Hoppner became a chorister at the royal chapel, but, showing strong inclination for art, in 1775 he entered the Royal Academy. In 1778, he took a silver medal for drawing from life, and in 1782 the Academy's highest award, the gold medal for historical painting, his subject being King Lear.

== Career ==
Hoppner first exhibited at the Royal Academy in 1780. His earliest love was for landscape, but necessity obliged him to turn to the more lucrative business of portrait painting. At once successful, he had throughout life the most fashionable and wealthy sitters, and was the greatest rival to the growing attraction of Thomas Lawrence, with whom he shared an assistant between 1803 and 1809, Samuel Lane, much to Lawrence's annoyance. He rarely attempted subjects from history painting or mythology, though a Sleeping Venus, Belisarius, Jupiter and Io, a Bacchante and Cupid and Psyche are recorded among his works. The Prince of Wales visited him especially often, and many of his finest portraits were hung in the state apartments at St James's Palace, notably those of the prince himself, the Duke and Duchess of York, Lord Rodney and Lord Nelson. His other sitters included Sir Walter Scott, the Duke of Wellington, Henry Bartle Frere and Sir George Beaumont.

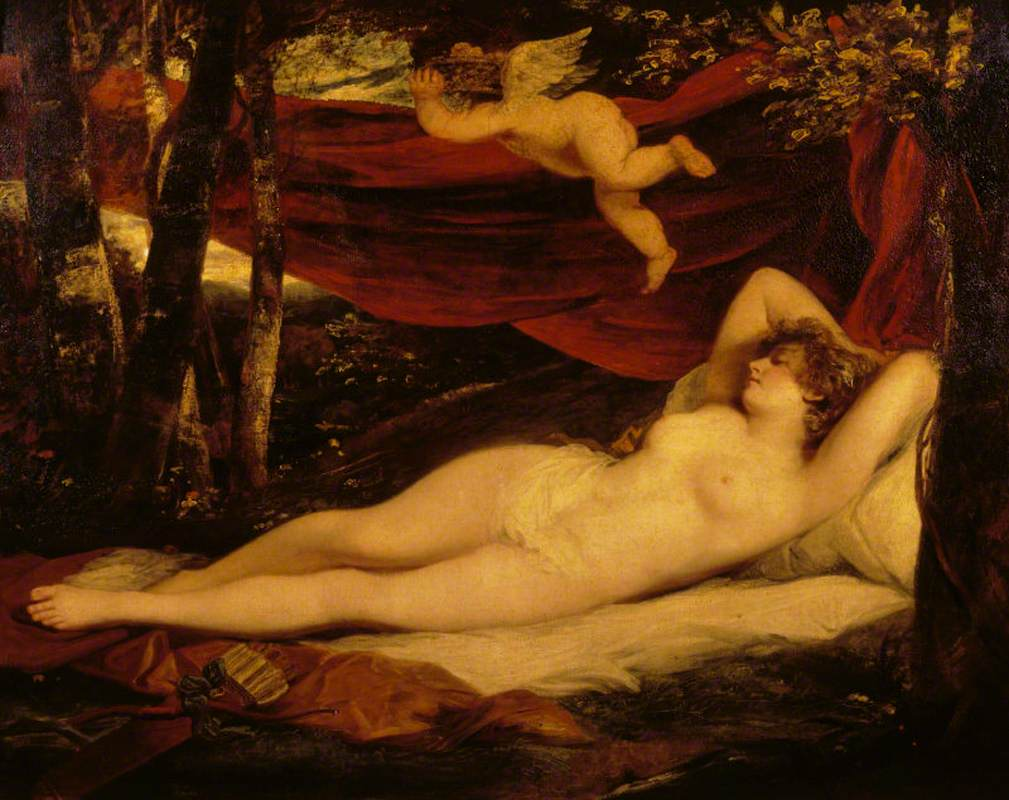
Sleeping Nymph and Cupid, 1806, now at Petworth House. The model for the nymph was said at the time to be Georgiana Leicester, Baroness de Tabley.

According to the 1911 edition of the Encyclopædia Britannica:

Competent judges have deemed his most successful works to be his portraits of women and children... He was confessedly an imitator of Reynolds. When first painted, his works were much admired for the brilliancy and harmony of their colouring, but the injury due to destructive mediums and lapse of time which many of them suffered caused a great depreciation in his reputation. The appearance, however, of some of his pictures in good condition has shown that his fame as a brilliant colourist was well-founded. His drawing is faulty, but his touch has qualities of breadth and freedom that give to his paintings a faint reflection of the charm of Reynolds.

In 1803, he published A Series of Portraits of Ladies, engraved after his paintings by Charles Wilkin, and in 1805 a volume of translations of Eastern tales into English verse.

Unusually Hoppner painted the background and perhaps more of a full-length portrait of Charlotte, Countess Talbot by Thomas Gainsborough in 1788, the year in which Gainsborough died. It is now in the Dunedin Public Art Gallery.

== Personal life ==
He married Phoebe Wright, the daughter of American-born sculptor Patience Wright. They had five children, although little is known about the youngest:

- Catherine Hampden Hoppner (1784–1828), Magistrate, East India Company
- Richard Belgrave Hoppner (1786–1872), British Consul general, Venice, and friend of Byron (ref: Oxford DNB, entry on RBH in entry on John Hoppner)
- Wilson (sometimes known as William) Lascelles Hoppner (1788-?), artist
- Henry Parkyns Hoppner (1795–1833), officer of the Royal Navy, Arctic explorer, draughtsman/artist
- youngest unknown Hoppner

== Death ==
In his later years Hoppner suffered from a chronic disease of the liver. He died on 23 January 1810.

== Gallery ==
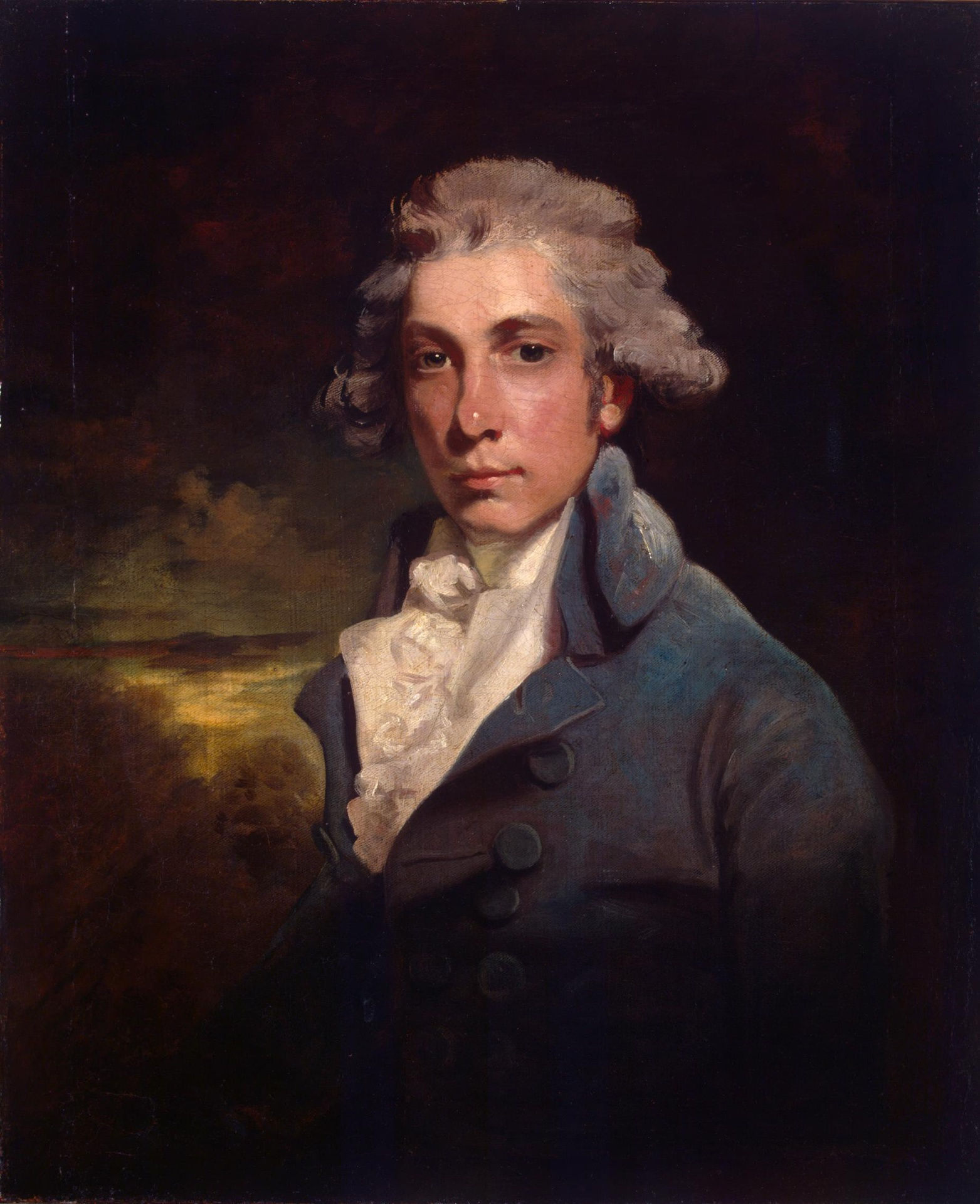
Richard Brinsley Sheridan, c.1788

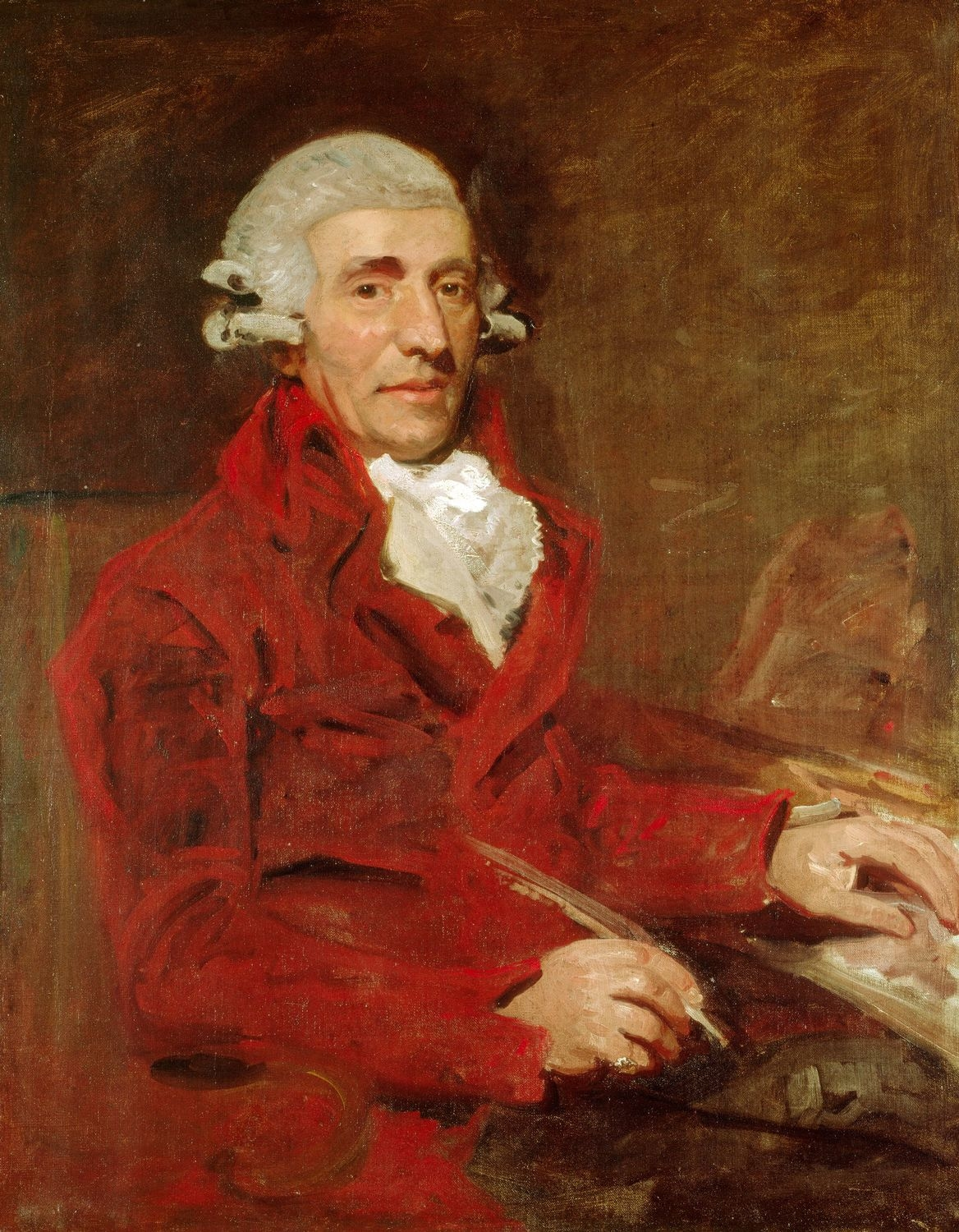
Joseph Haydn, c.1791, Royal Collection

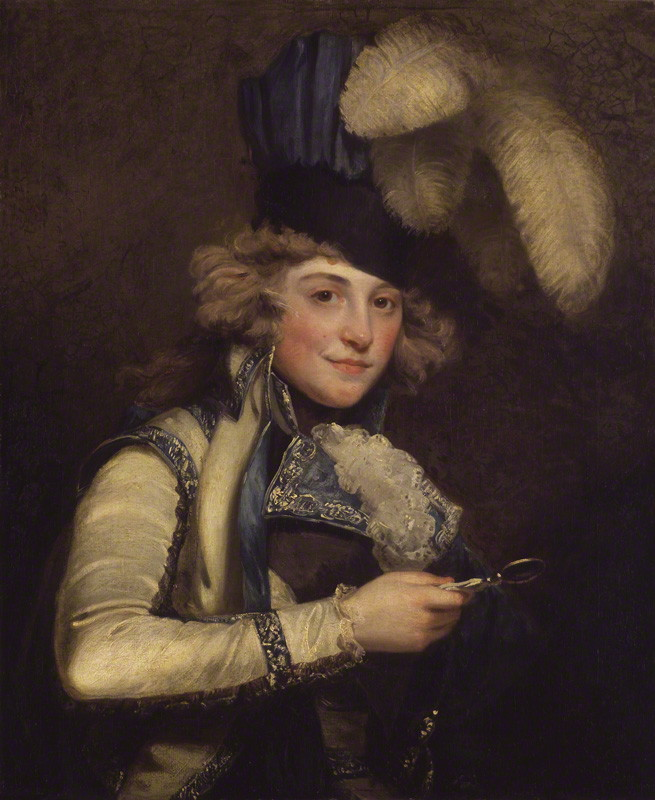
Dorothea Jordan as Hippolyta, 1791

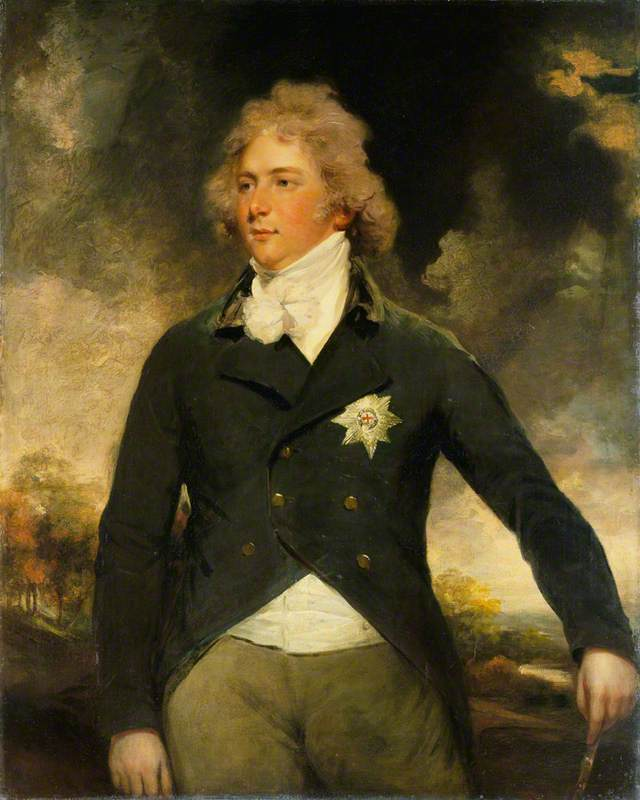
George, Prince of Wales, 1792, Wallace Collection

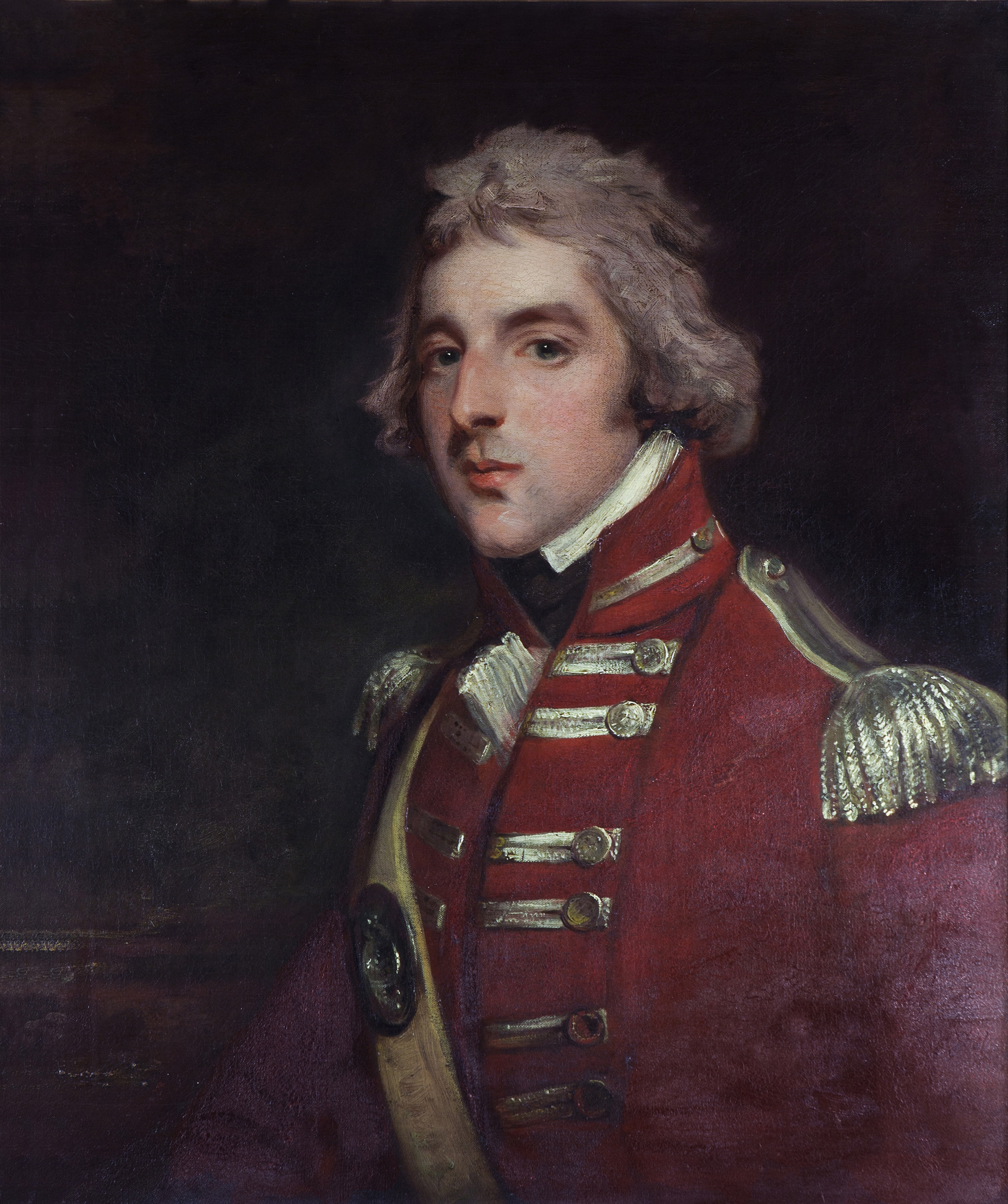
Portrait of Arthur Wellesley, 1795

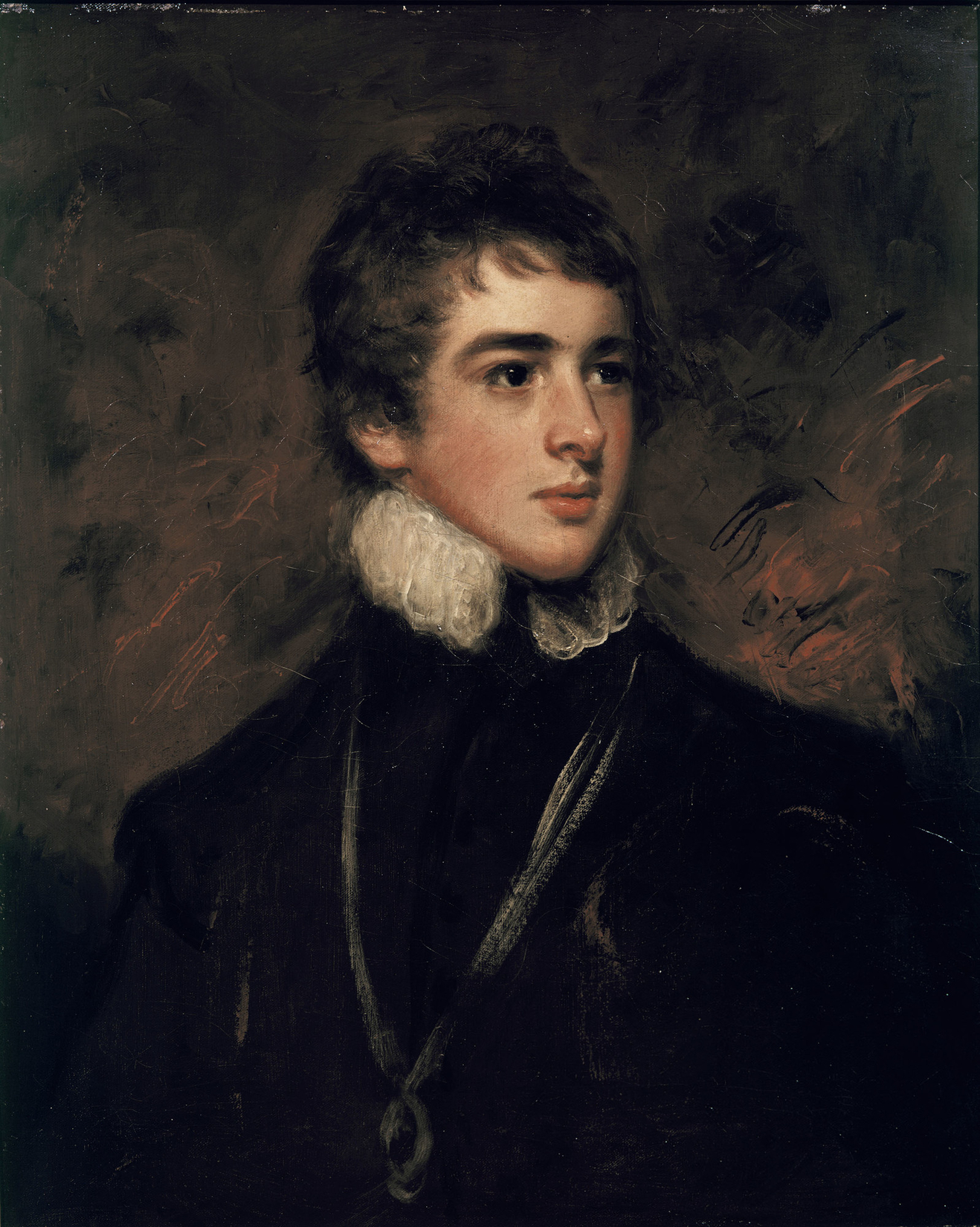
Portrait of William Lamb, 1796, Royal Collection

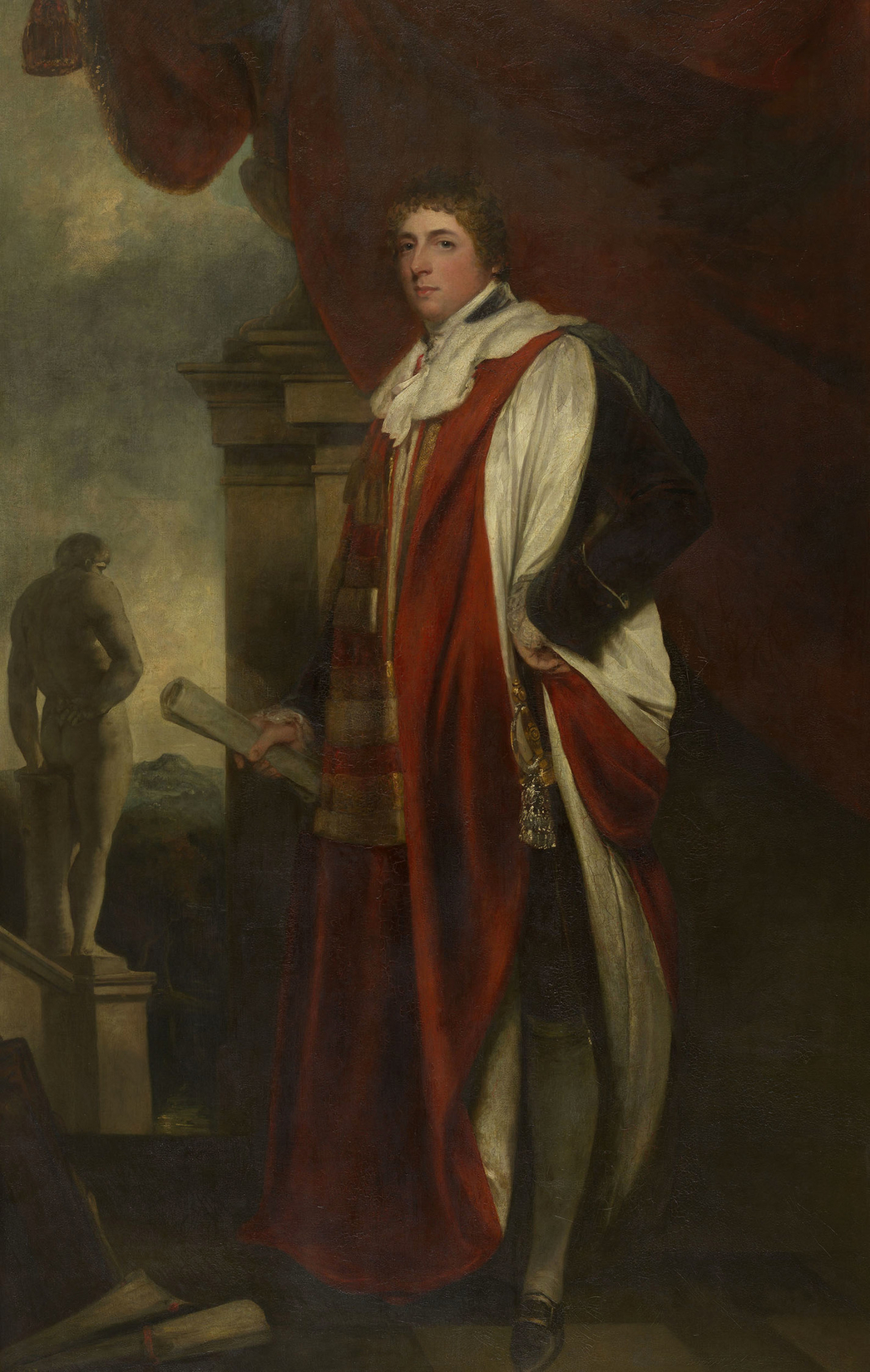
Duke of Bedford, 1796, Royal Collection

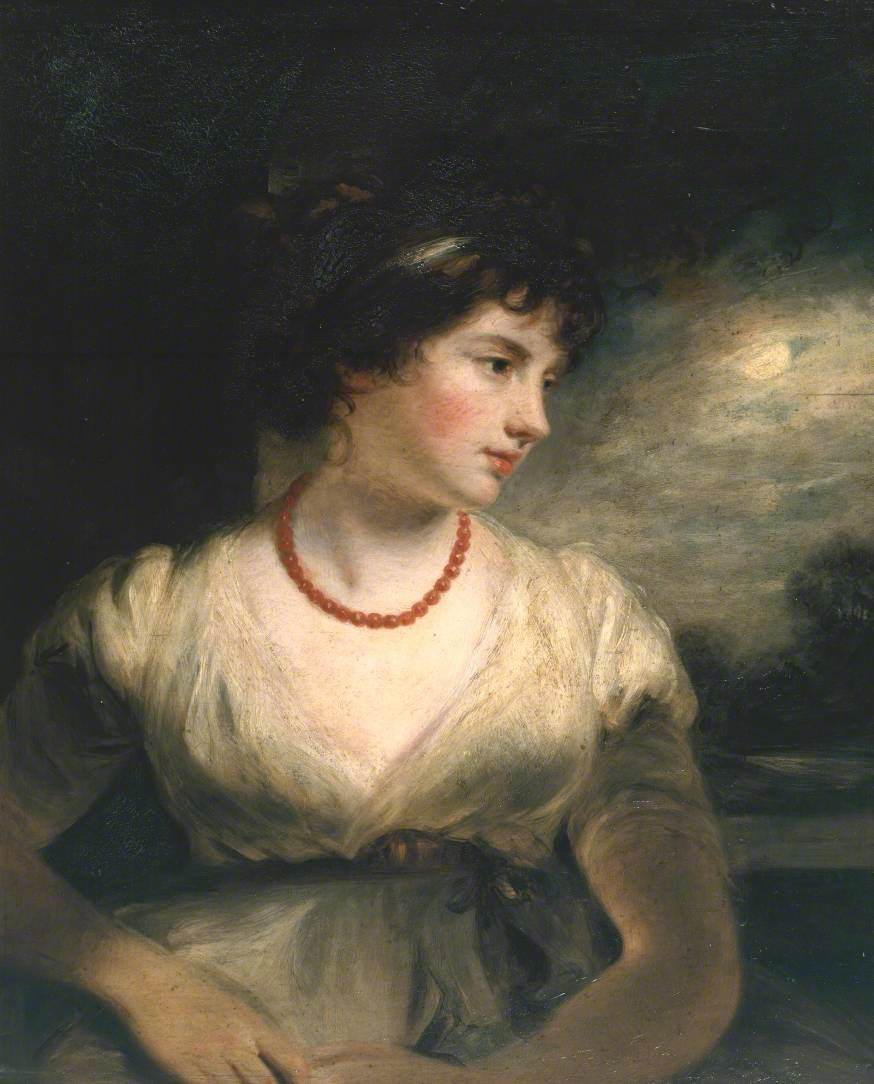
Countess of Oxford, 1797, National Gallery

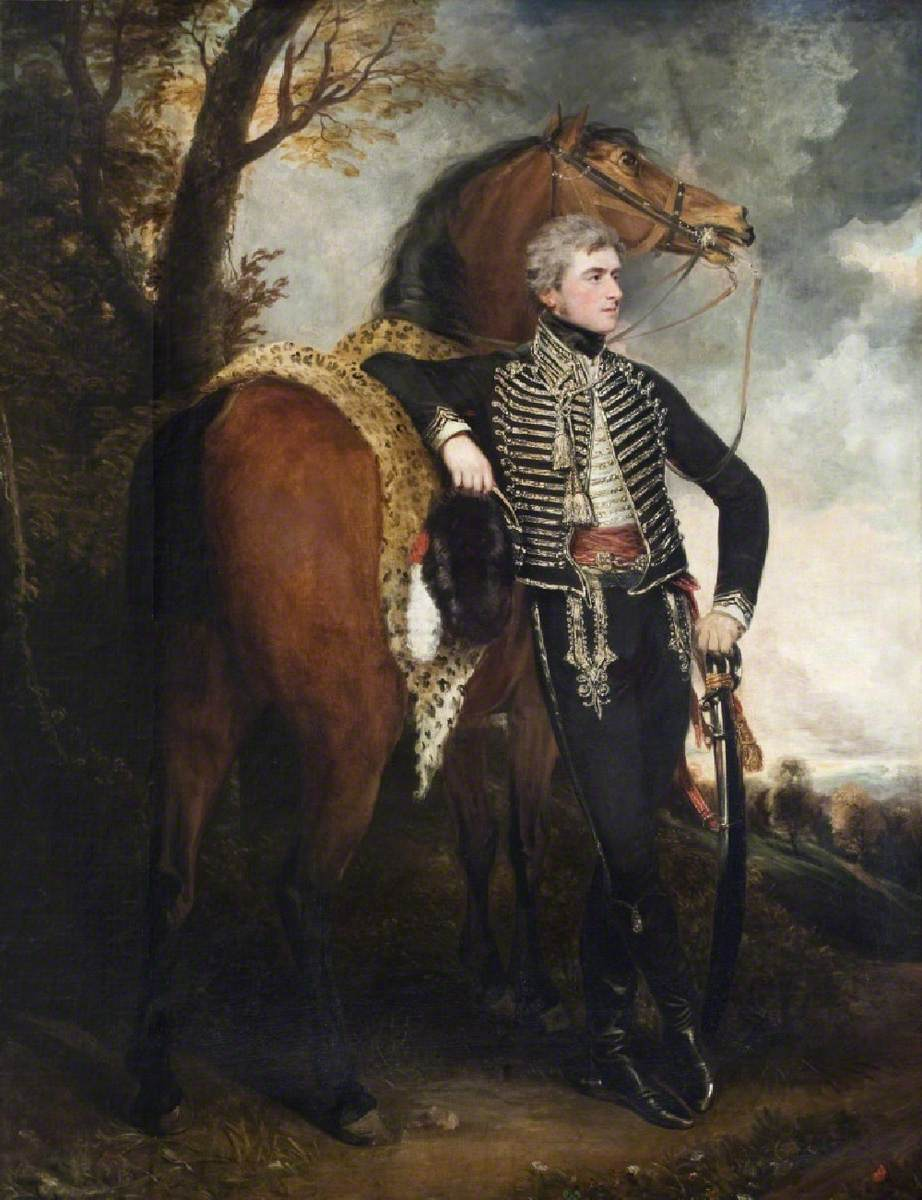
Lord Paget, 1798, National Trust

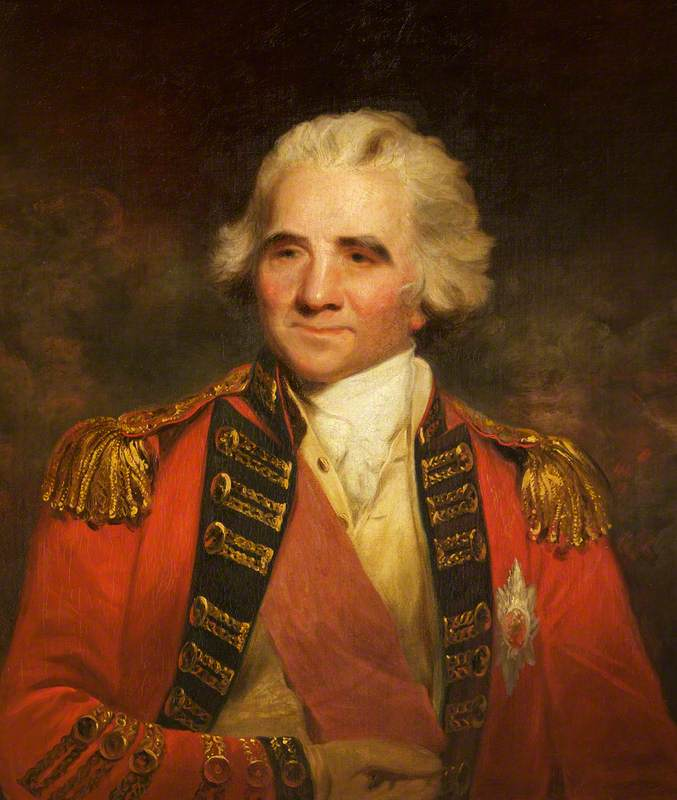
Sir Ralph Abercromby, 1798

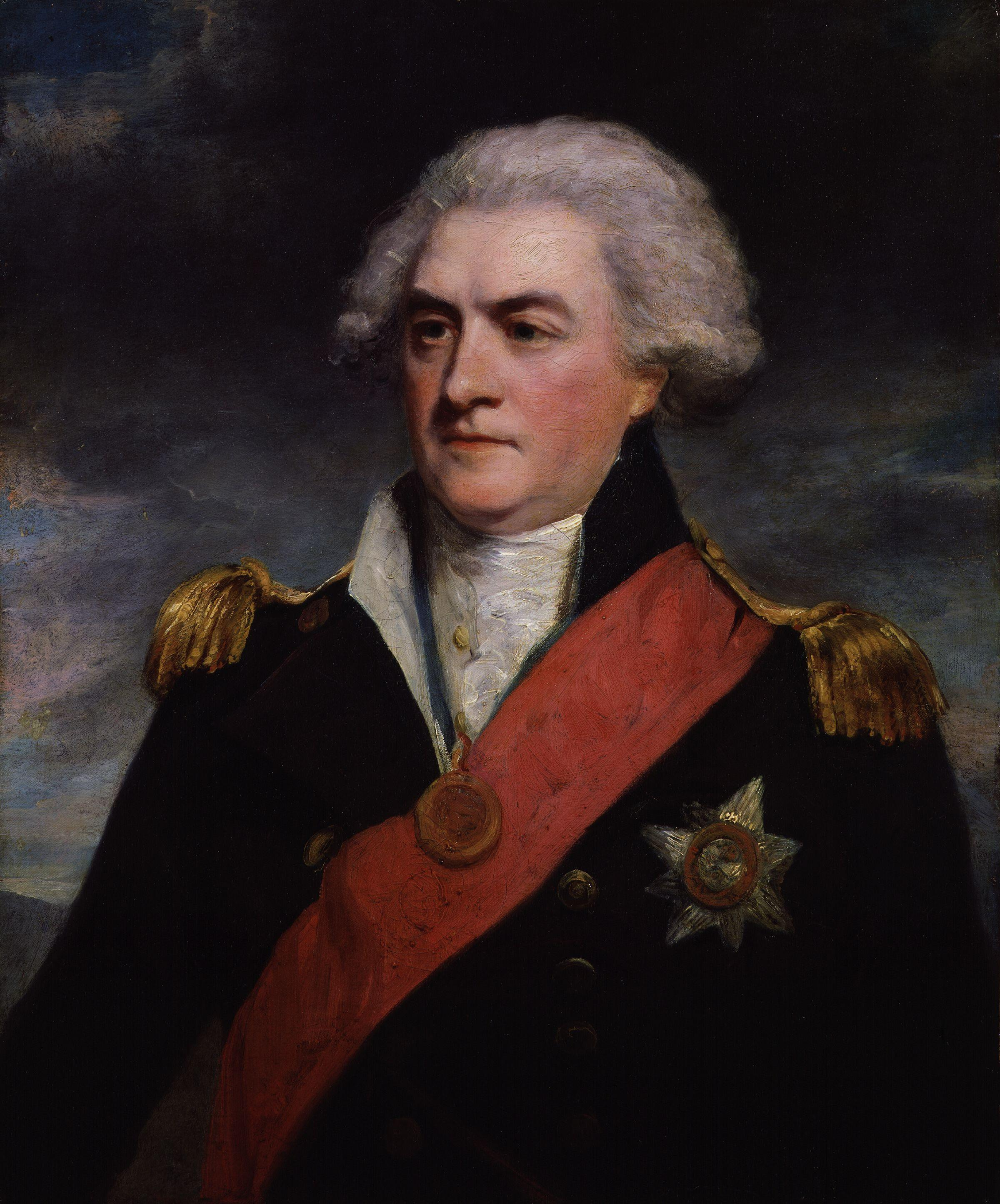
Admiral Duncan, c.1798

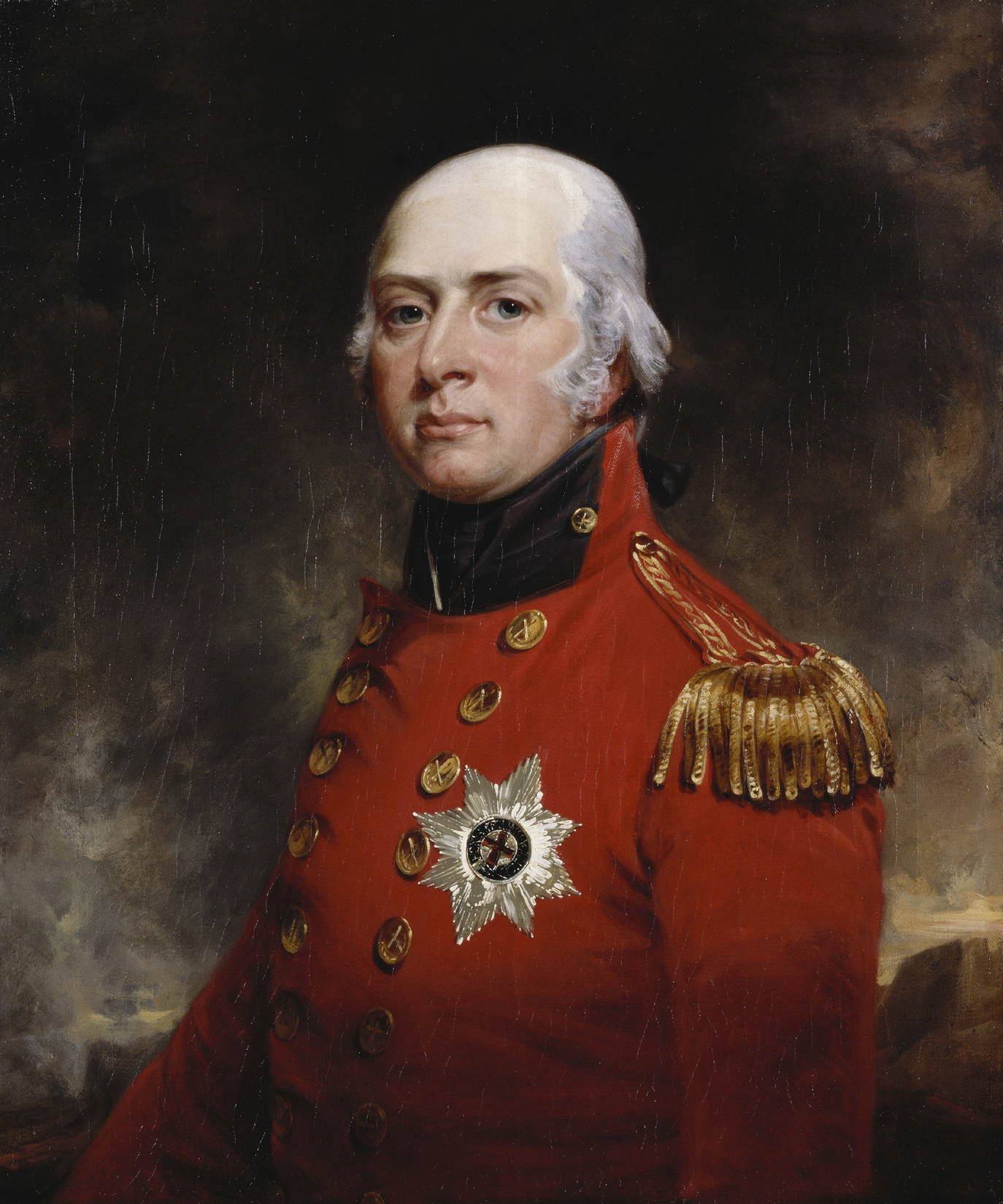
Duke of Kent, c.1799, Royal Collection

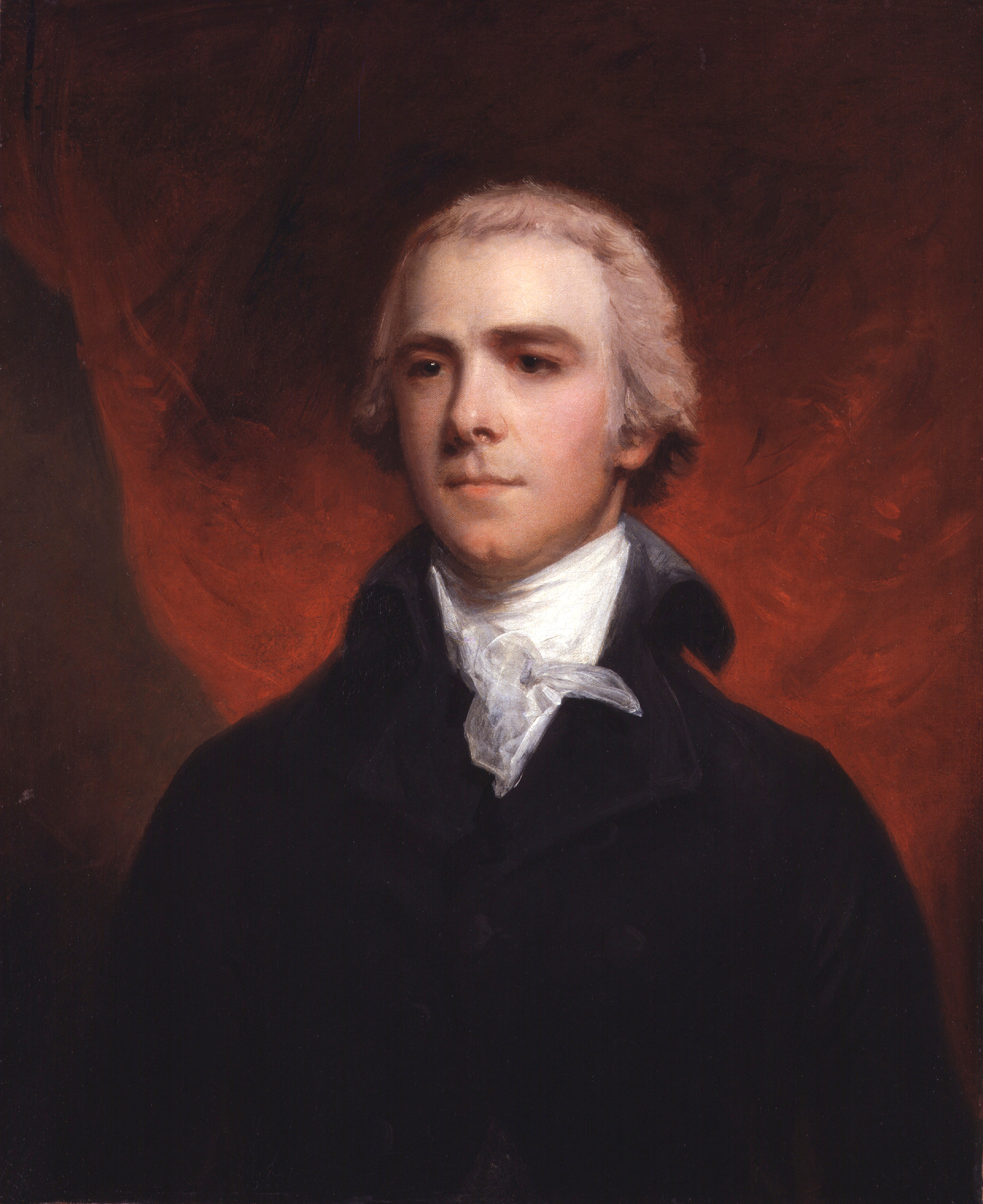
Portrait of Lord Grenville, c.1800

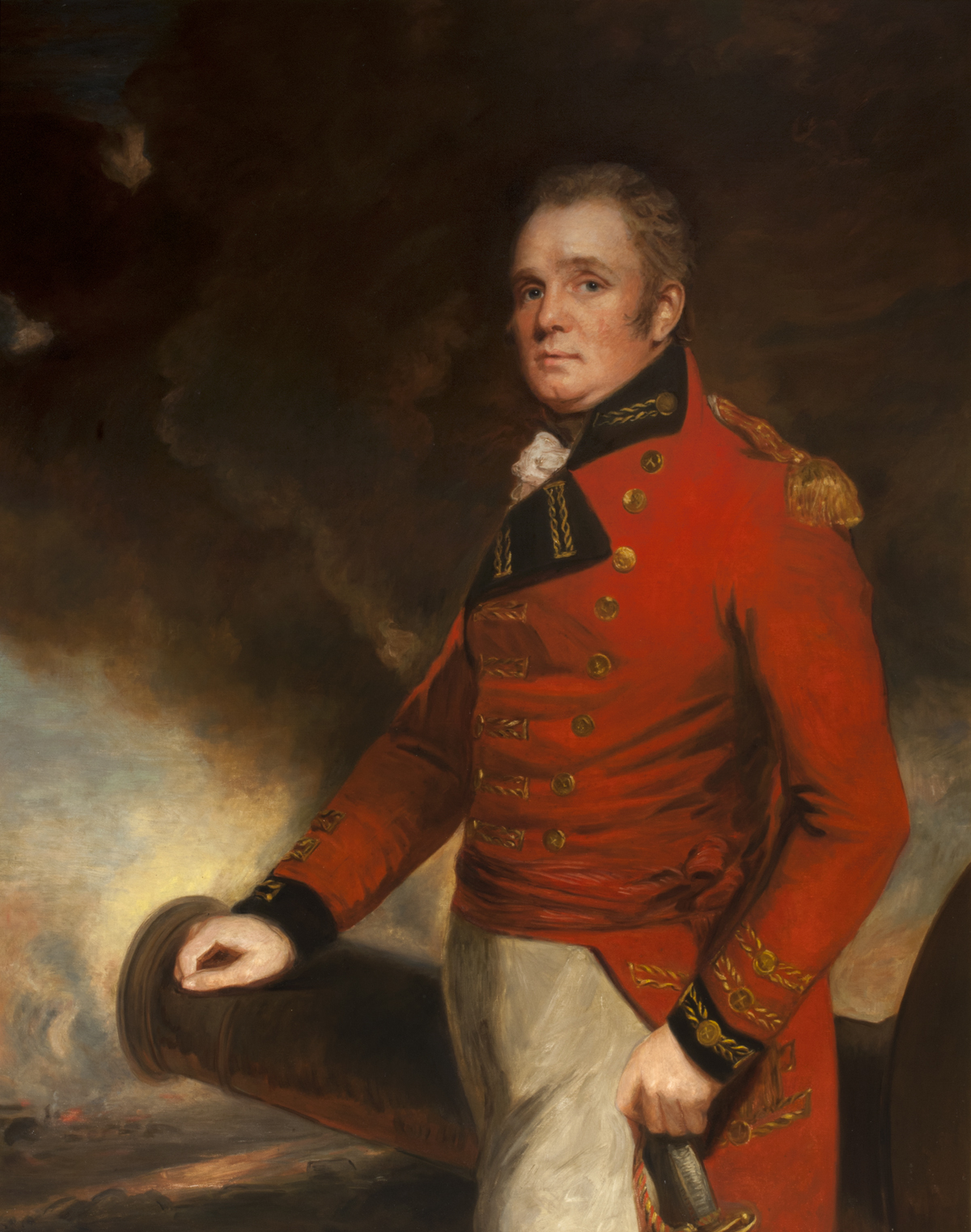
Thomas Maitland, 1800

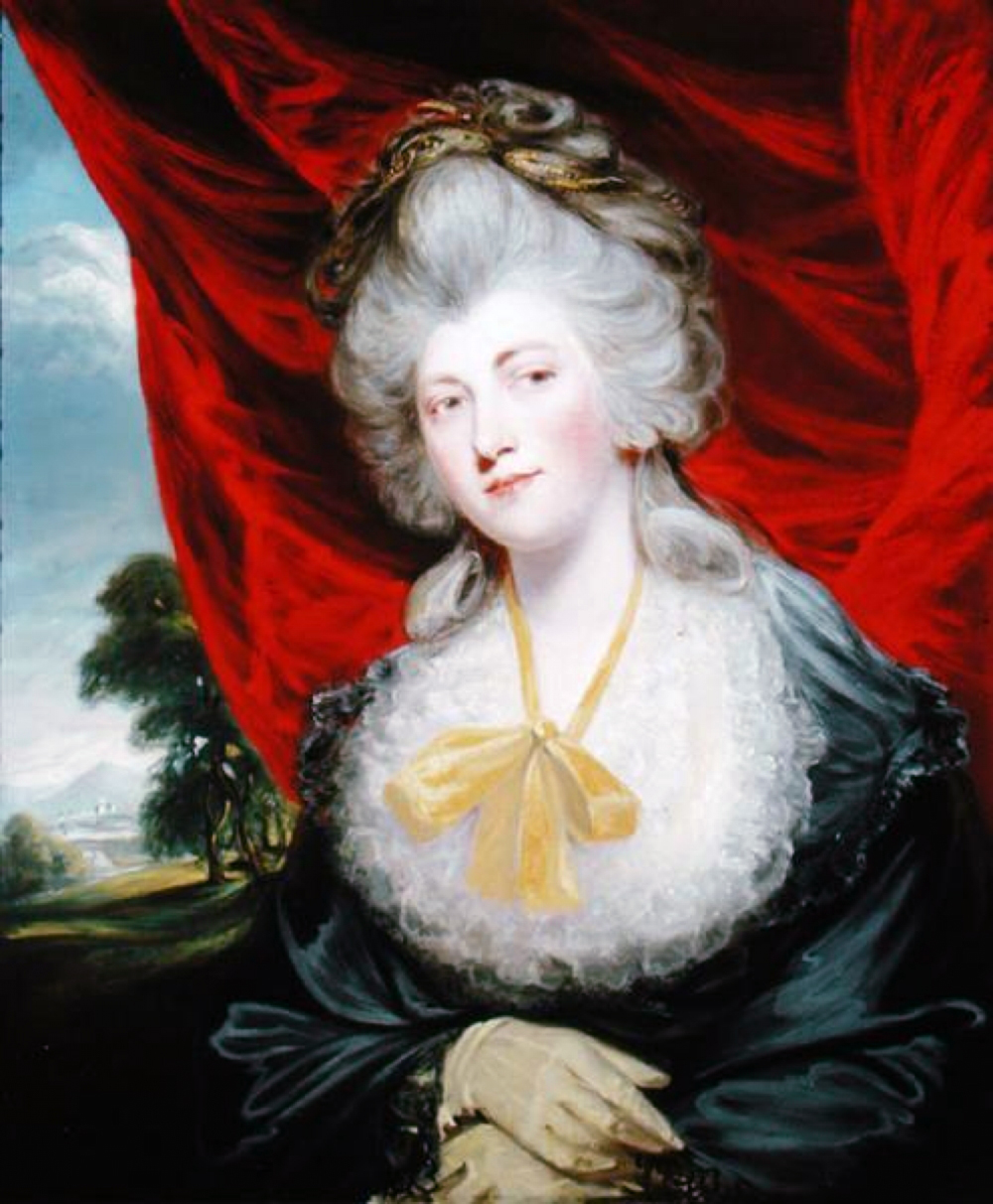
Lady Hertford, 1800

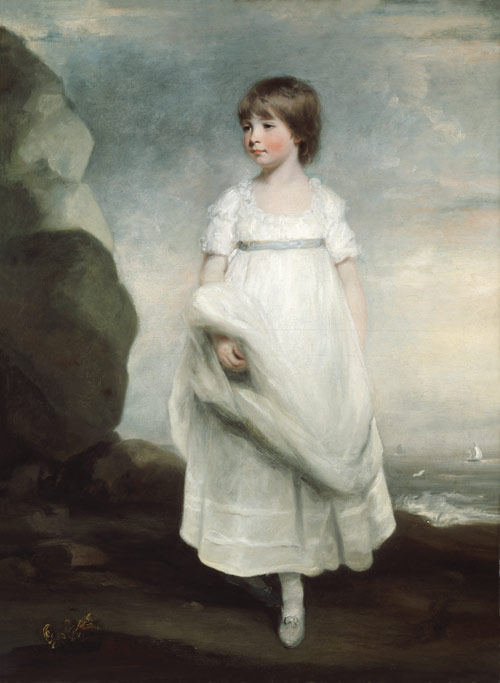
Portrait of Anne Isabella Milbanke, 1800

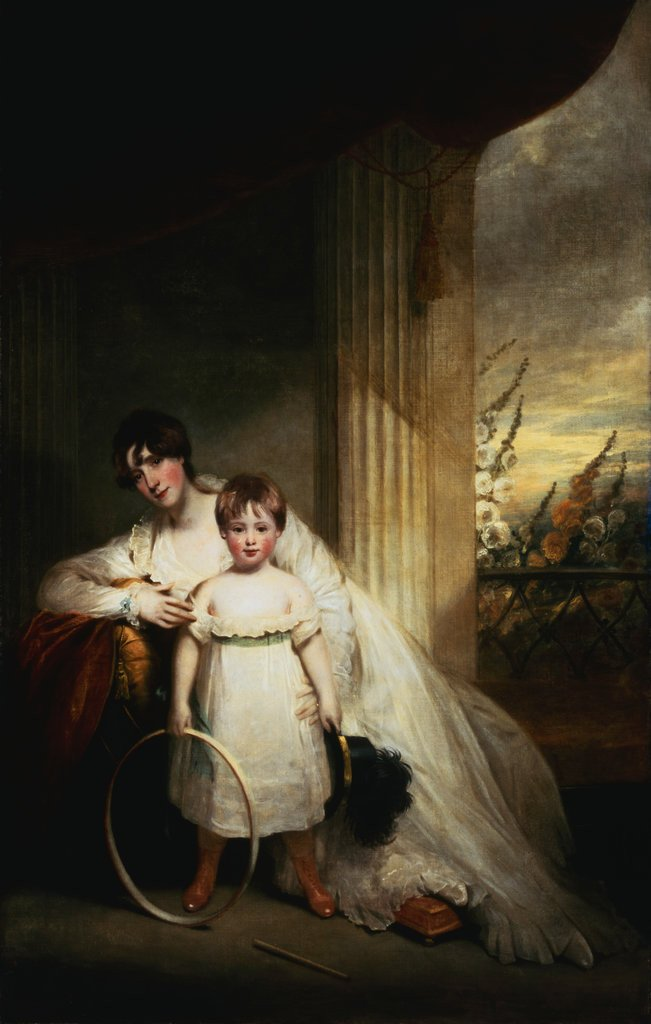
Georgiana St Leger and her son Pascoe St Leger Grenfell c.1800

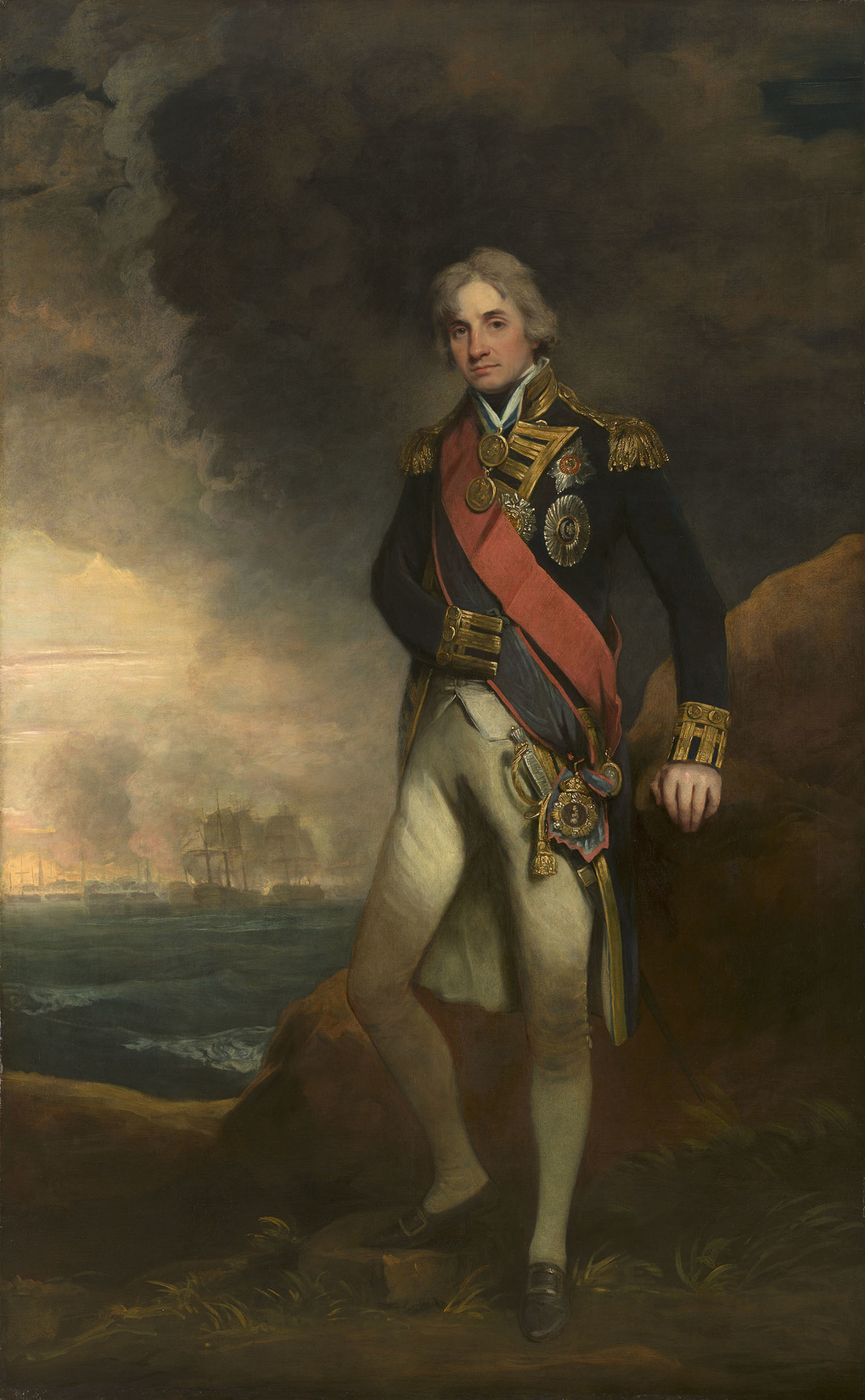
Lord Nelson, c.1801, Royal Collection

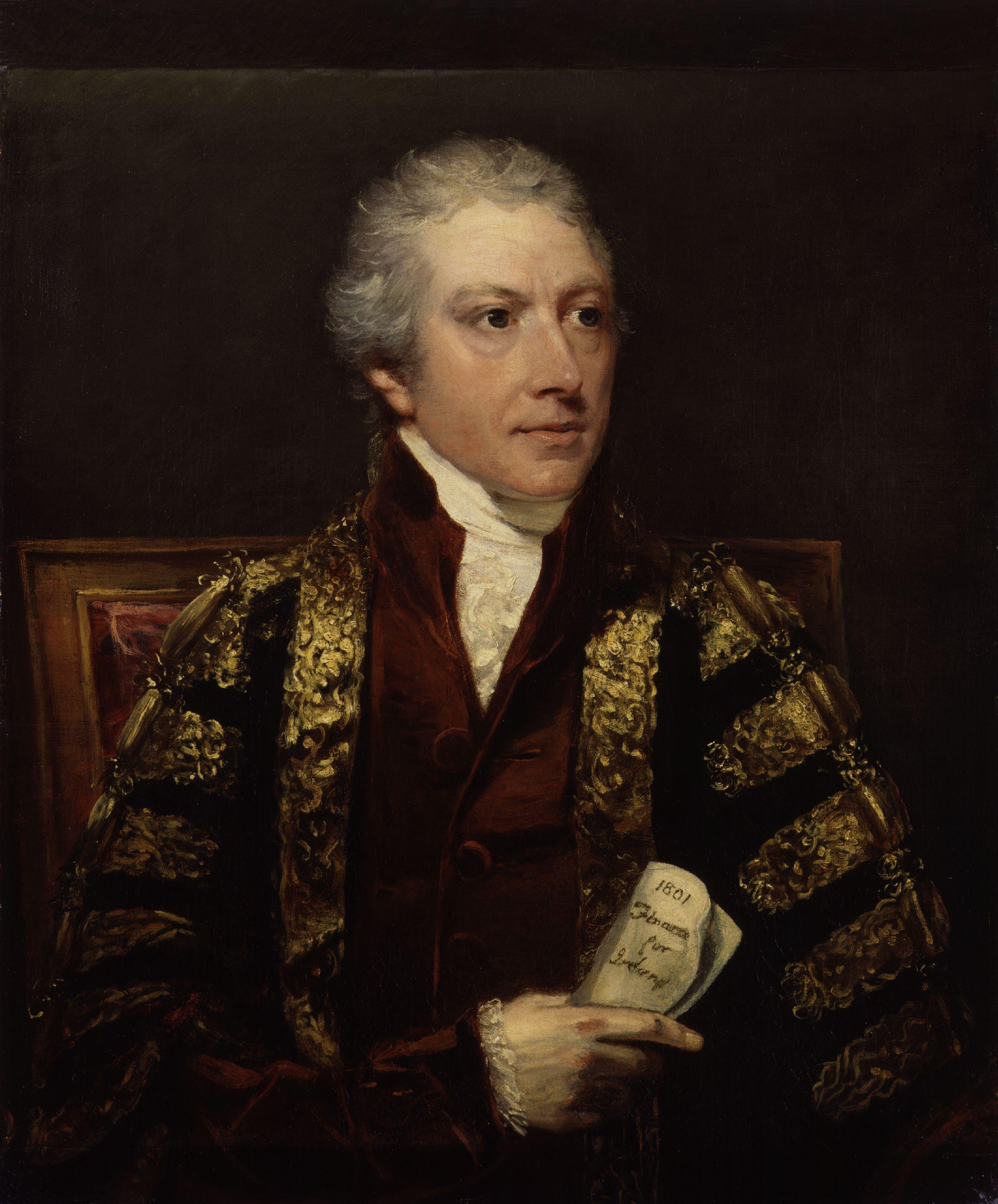
Charles Abbot, c.1802

Portrait of Sir George Beaumont, 1803

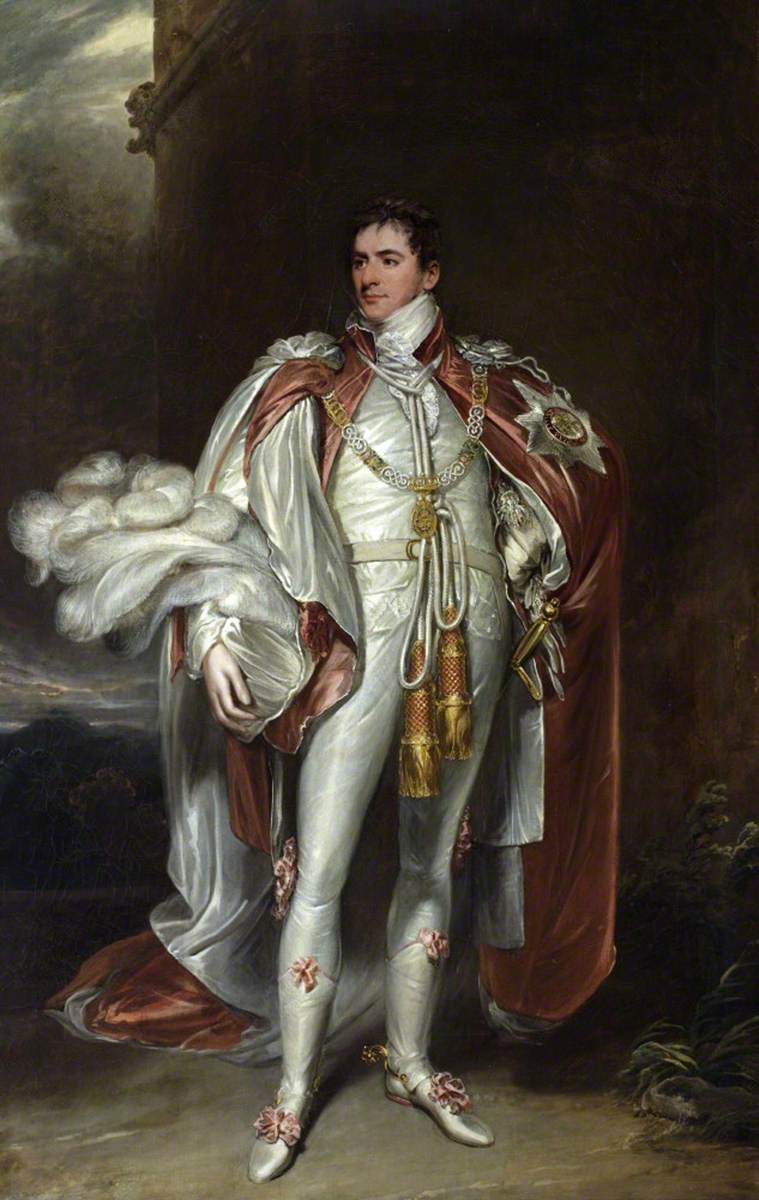
Arthur Paget, 1804, National Trust

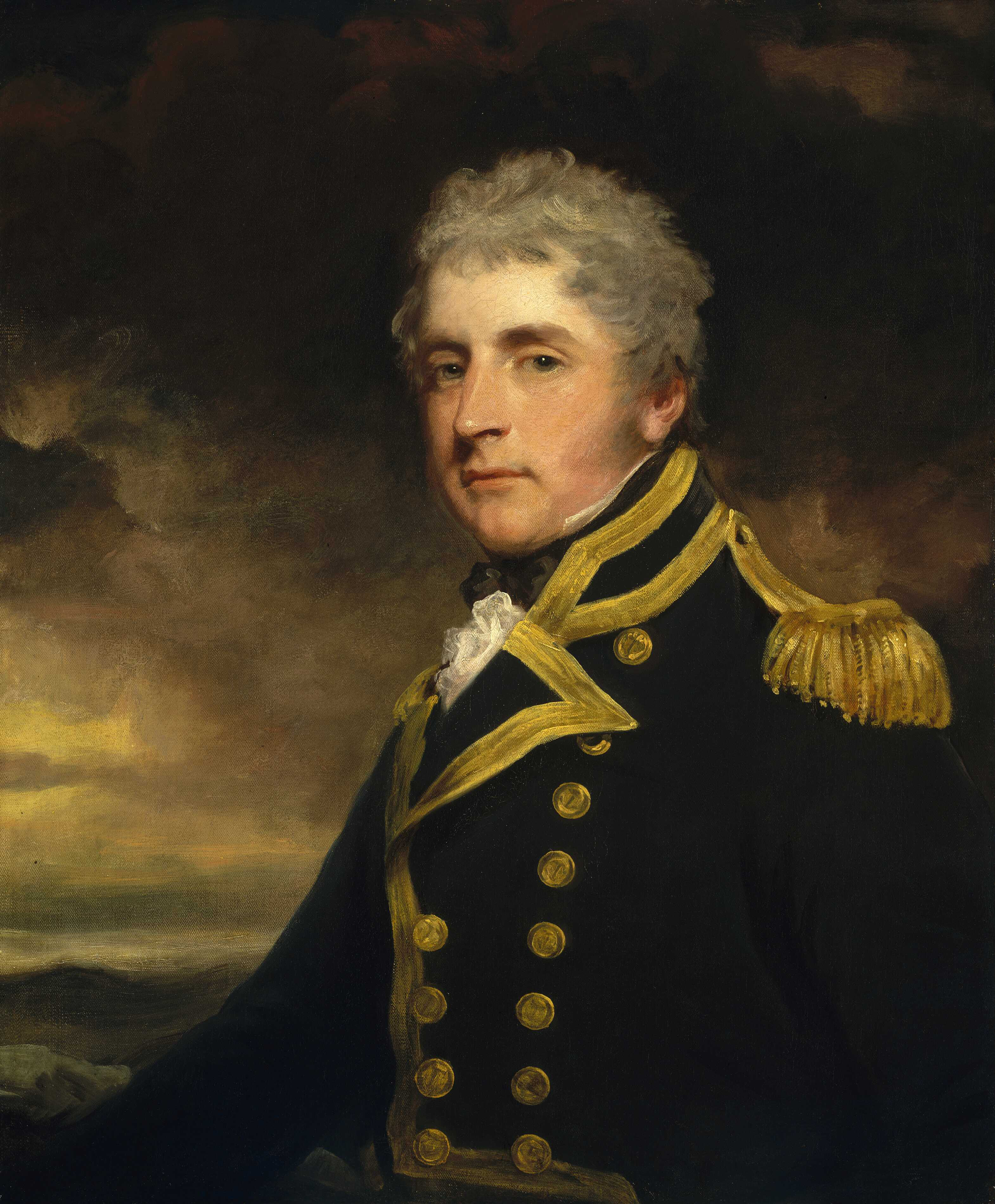
Henry Blackwood, c.1806

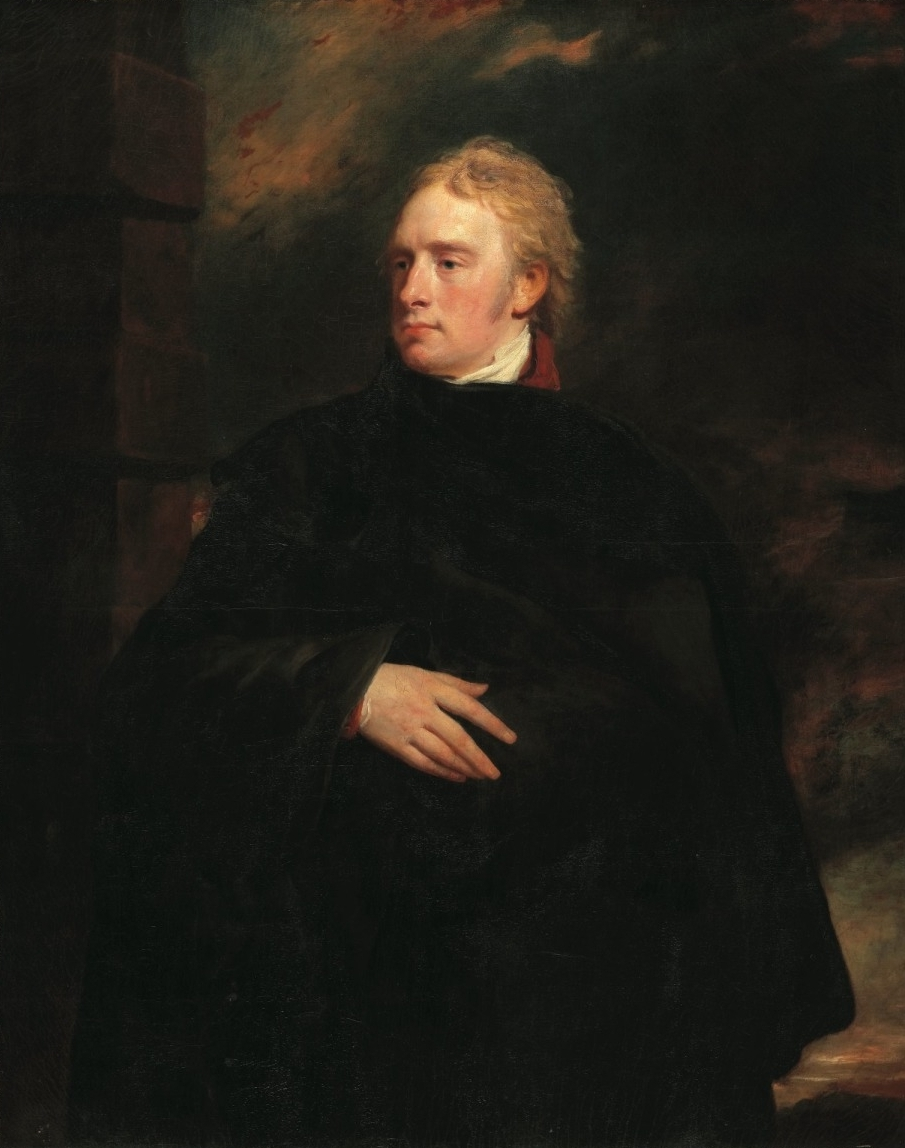
John Hookham Frere, 1806

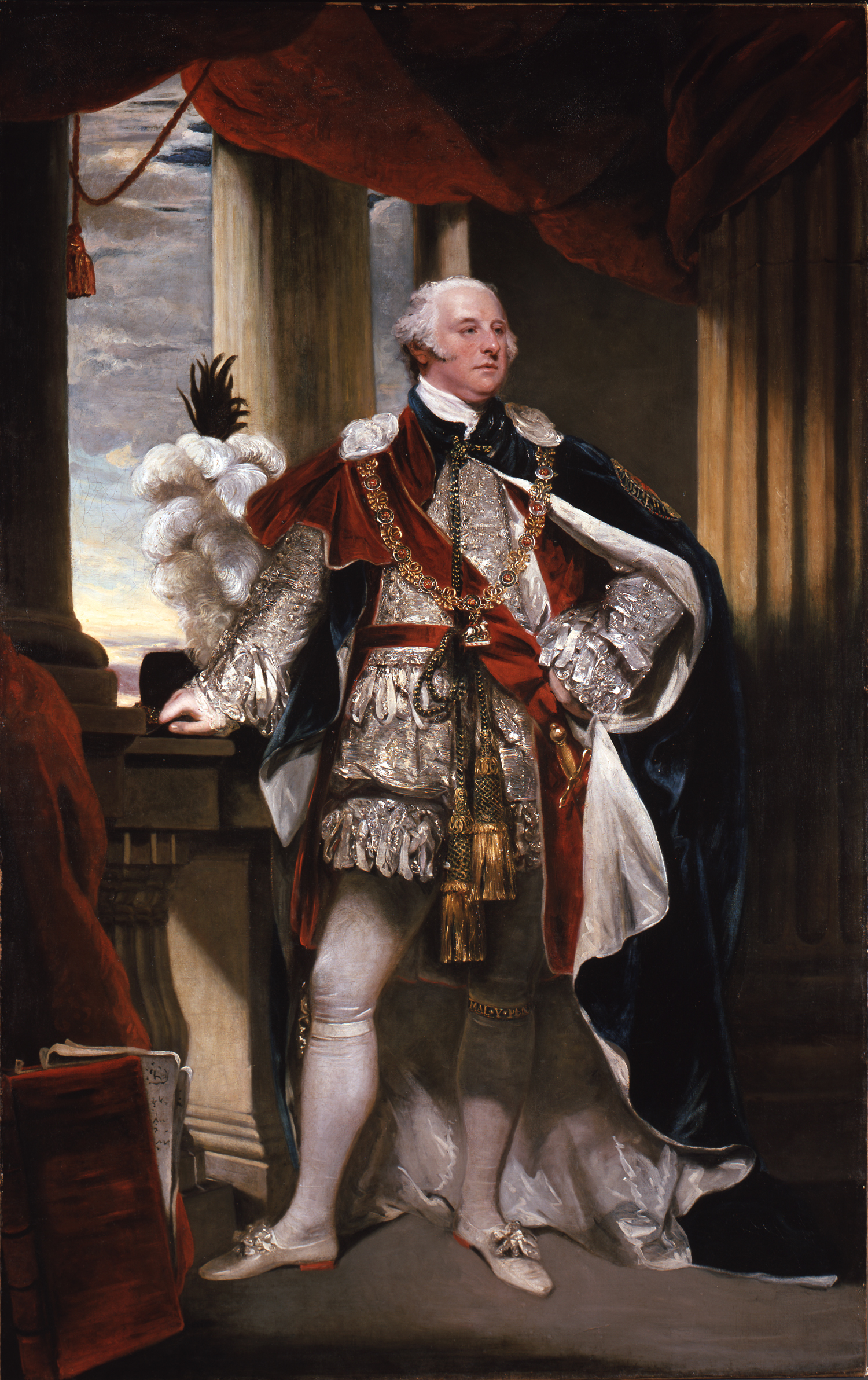
Portrait of Lord Camden, 1806

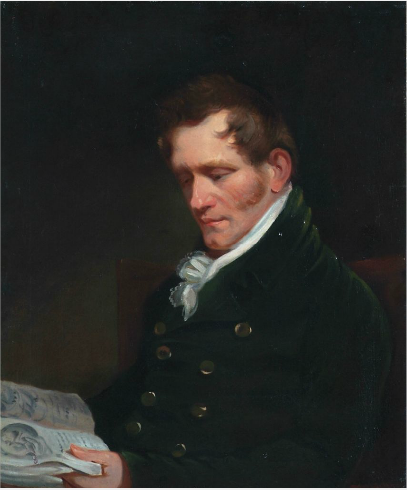
Dr. Matthias Hoffman, Province House (Nova Scotia)

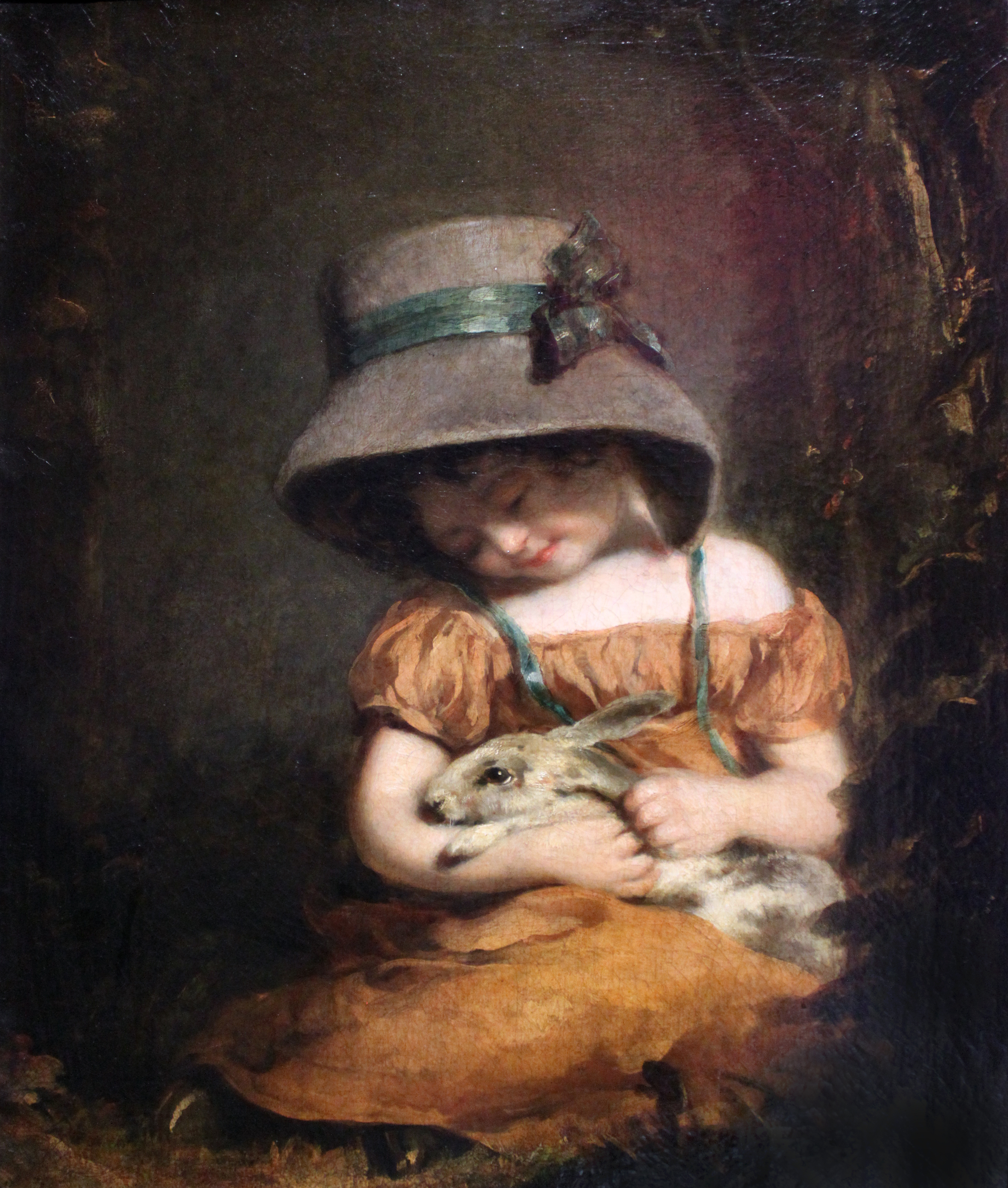
Girl with rabbit, 1800, Städelsches Kunstinstitut
