= Antoine Renou =

French painter

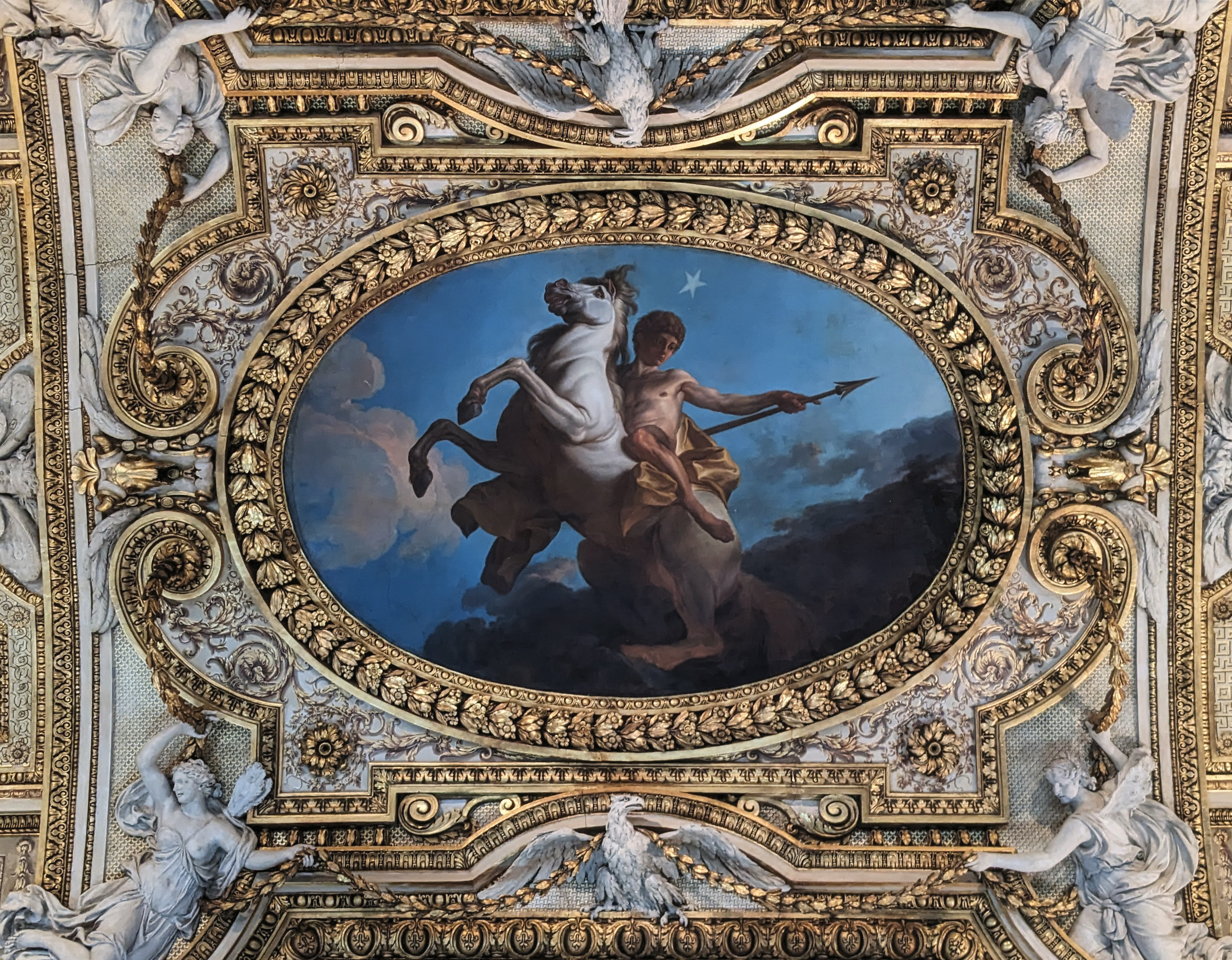
Antoine Renou, l'Étoile du matin ou Castor (1781), Paris, palais du Louvre, galerie d'Apollon.

Antoine Renou (1731 in Paris – 13 December 1806) was an 18th–19th-century French painter and playwright.

Antoine Renou was a member then perpetual secretary of the Académie royale de peinture et de sculpture.

He created L'Étoile du matin (1781), one of the plafonnantes paintings of the galerie d'Apollon of the Louvre Palace in Paris, which was his reception piece to the Académie. it was the counterpart to the Soir by Charles Le Brun.

Renou also authored some fifteen theatre plays.
