= 1800 in art =

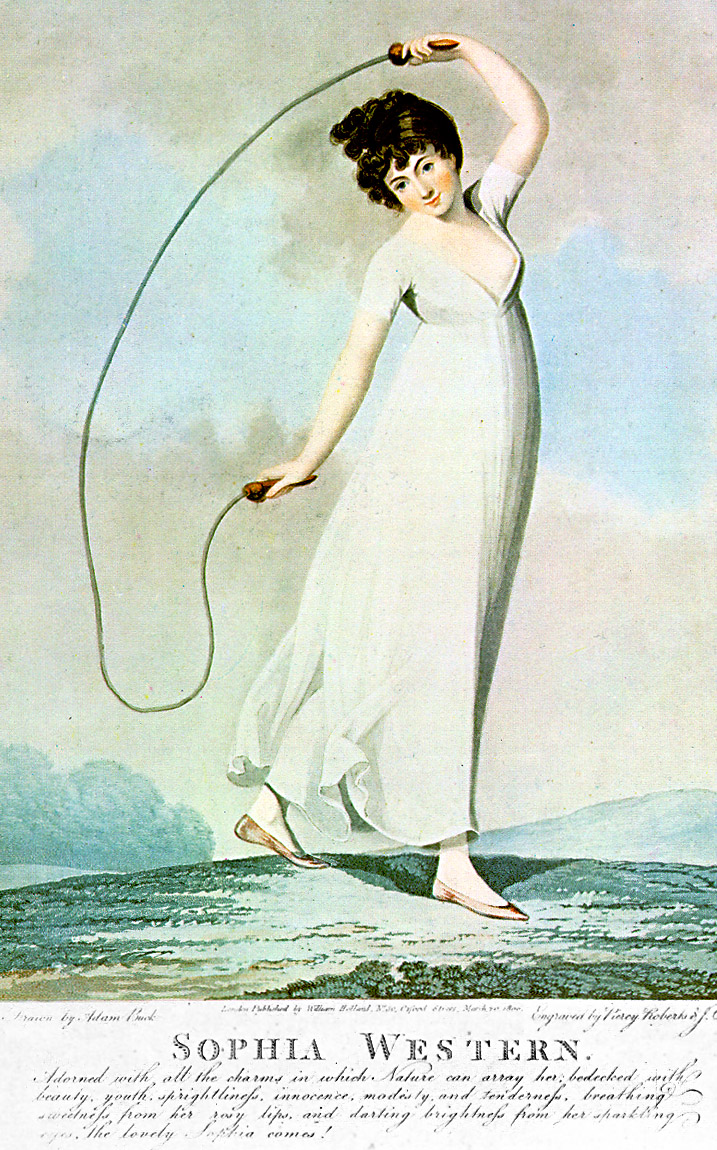

The year 1800 in art is often estimated to be the beginning of the change from the Neoclassicism movement, that was based on Roman art, to the Romantic movement, which encouraged emotional art and ended around 1850.

== Events ==
- May 31 – The National Art Gallery (Nationale Kunst-Galerij), precursor of the Rijksmuseum, opens in Huis ten Bosch in The Hague, Batavian Republic.
- September 2 – The Salon of 1800 opens at the Louvre in Paris
- François-André Vincent marries fellow-painter Adélaïde Labille-Guiard.

== Works ==
- William Beechey – Portrait of George III
- Jacques-Louis David – Portrait of Madame Récamier
- Heinrich Füger – portraits of Lord Nelson
- Francisco Goya – La Maja desnuda (approximate completion date)
- John Hoppner
  - Portrait of Anne Isabella Milbanke
  - Portrait of Lord Grenville
- Philip James de Loutherbourg
  - The Battle of the Nile
  - A Fishing Boat Brought Ashore near Conway Castle
- James Northcote – The Presentation of British Officers to Pope Pius VI, 1794
- John Opie
  - The Fugitive
  - Portrait of a Lady in the Character of Cressida
  - Portrait of Thomas Girtin
- Henry Raeburn – The MacDonald Children (approximate date)
- Martin Archer Shee – Portrait of the Duke of Clarence
- Henry Singleton – The Last Effort and Fall of Tippoo Sultaun
- George Stubbs – Hambletonian Rubbing Down
- Benjamin West – Joshua Passing the River Jordan with the Ark of the Covenant

== Births ==
- January 12 – Eugène Lami, French painter and lithographer (died 1890)
- February 6 – Achille Devéria, French painter and lithographer (died 1857)
- February 9 – Joseph von Führich, Austrian painter (died 1876)
- February 22 – Richard Seymour-Conway, 4th Marquess of Hertford, English francophile art collector (died 1870)
- March 10 – Thomas Webster, English genre painter (died 1886)
- May 26 – Charles-Philogène Tschaggeny
- June 9 – James Wilson Carmichael, English marine painter (died 1868)
- July 2 – Piotr Michałowski, Polish portrait painter (died 1855)
- July 11 – Charles Lees, Scottish portrait painter (died 1880)
- August 10 – George Cattermole, English illustrator and watercolourist (died 1868)
- October 14 – John Hogan, Irish sculptor (died 1858)
- November 20 – Richard Rothwell, Irish portrait and genre painter (died 1868)
- date unknown
  - Auguste-Joseph Carrier, French miniature painter (died 1875)
  - Frederick Yeates Hurlstone, English painter (died 1869)
- probable
  - Charles Codman, landscape painter of Portland, Maine (died 1842)
  - Achille Leonardi, Italian artist (died 1870)

== Deaths ==
- May 21 – Carl August Ehrensvärd, Swedish naval officer, painter, author, and neo-classical architect (born 1745)
- October 25 – Thomas Macklin, art dealer (born c.1753)
- December – Jean-Baptiste Audebert, naturalist and artist (born 1759)
- December 5 – Carlo Frigerio, painter (born 1763)
- date unknown
  - Manuel Acevedo, Spanish painter (born 1744)
  - John Clayton, painter (born 1728)
  - Francisco Agustín y Grande, Spanish painter of the Neoclassic style (born 1753)
  - François-Nicolas Martinet, engraver and naturalist (born c.1760)
  - Louis Rolland Trinquesse, painter (born c.1746)
  - Henry Wigstead, painter and caricaturist
- probable – Nicolas Benjamin Delapierre, French artist (born 1739)
