= 1728 in art =

Events from the year 1728 in art.

== Events ==
- October 20 – Copenhagen Fire of 1728: The worst fire in the history of Copenhagen breaks out. It lasts for 3 days and destroys important cultural treasures such as the University of Copenhagen library and original Baroque interiors of the Reformed Church, Copenhagen.
- Jean-Baptiste-Siméon Chardin is admitted to the Royal Academy.
- William Hogarth begins painting scenes from The Beggar's Opera.

== Paintings ==
Der Roschen
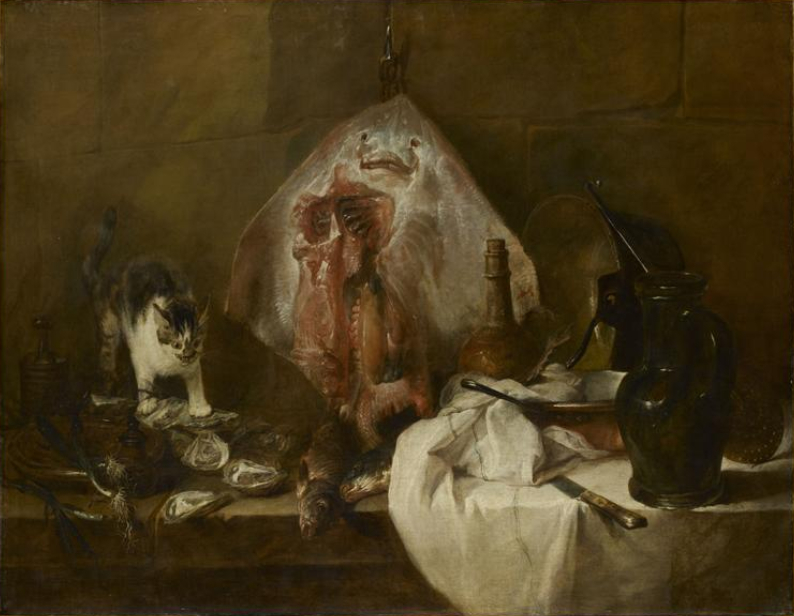
- Artist: Jean-Baptiste-Siméon Chardin
- Year: 1728

- Canaletto (1725–1728) (Hermitage Museum, Saint Petersburg)
  - View of Church of San Giovanni dei Battuti on the Isle of Murano
  - View of the Isles of San Michele, San Cristoforo and Murano from the Fondamenta Nuove
- Jean-Baptiste-Siméon Chardin – Der Roschen (Cat with Stingray)

== Births ==
- March 12 – Anton Raphael Mengs, German painter (died 1779)
- April 20 – Nicolas Henri Joseph de Fassin, Belgian landscape painter (died 1811)
- May 24 – Jean-Baptiste Pillement, Rococo painter, designer and engraver (died 1808)
- July 1 – Nicolas-Guy Brenet, French historical painter (died 1792)
- date unknown
  - Johan Alm, Finnish painter and field sergeant (died 1810)
  - Pietro Bardellino – Italian painter (died 1819)
  - Fabio Berardi, Italian engraver (died 1788)
  - Charles Catton, English painter (died 1798)
  - John Clayton, English painter (died 1800)
  - Nathan Drake, English painter (died 1778)
  - Ubaldo Gandolfi, Italian painter (died 1781)
  - Johan Philip Korn, Swedish painter (died 1796)
  - Marie-Thérèse Reboul, French painter of natural history, still lifes, and flowers (died 1805)

== Deaths ==
- January 26 – Paolo de Matteis, Italian painter who worked for the Spanish Viceroy of Naples (born 1662)
- April 21 – Cardinal Filippo Antonio Gualterio, art collector (born 1660)
- September 21 – Francis Place, English gentleman draughtsman, potter, engraver and printmaker (born 1647)
- November 27 – Santi Prunati, Italian painter of many churches in and around Verona (born 1652/1656)
- December 8 – Camillo Rusconi, Italian sculptor (born 1658)
- date unknown
  - Isaac Paling, Dutch Golden Age painter (born 1640)
  - Yang Jin, Chinese painter during the Qing Dynasty (born 1644)
