= David Charles Read =

English painter and etcher (1790–1851)

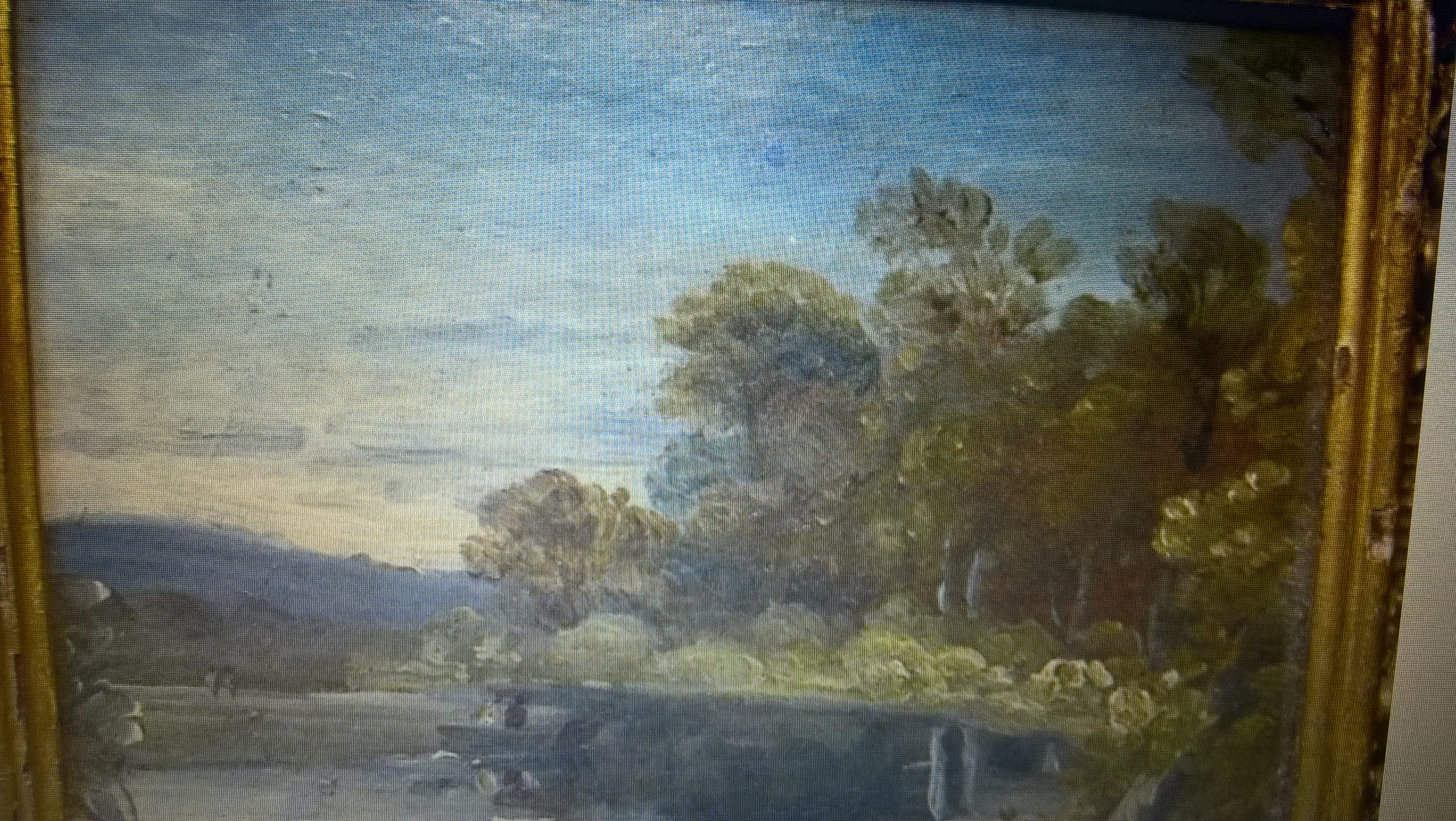
Small landscape oil painting of boat on the lake, dated 1834.

David Charles Read (1790–1851) was an English painter and etcher.

== Life ==
Born at Boldre, near Lymington, Hampshire, on 1 March 1790, Read went to London at an early age, and worked under John Scott the engraver; but, in poor health, he returned to the country.

In January 1820, Read settled at Salisbury, where he lived in the Cathedral close until 1845. He found employment as a drawing-master, and spent his spare time in sketching in pencil, water-colour, and oils.

On leaving Salisbury in 1845, Read spent more than a year in Italy. His health became seriously impaired towards the end of 1849, and he died at his residence, 24 Bedford Place, Kensington, London, on 28 May 1851.

== Works ==
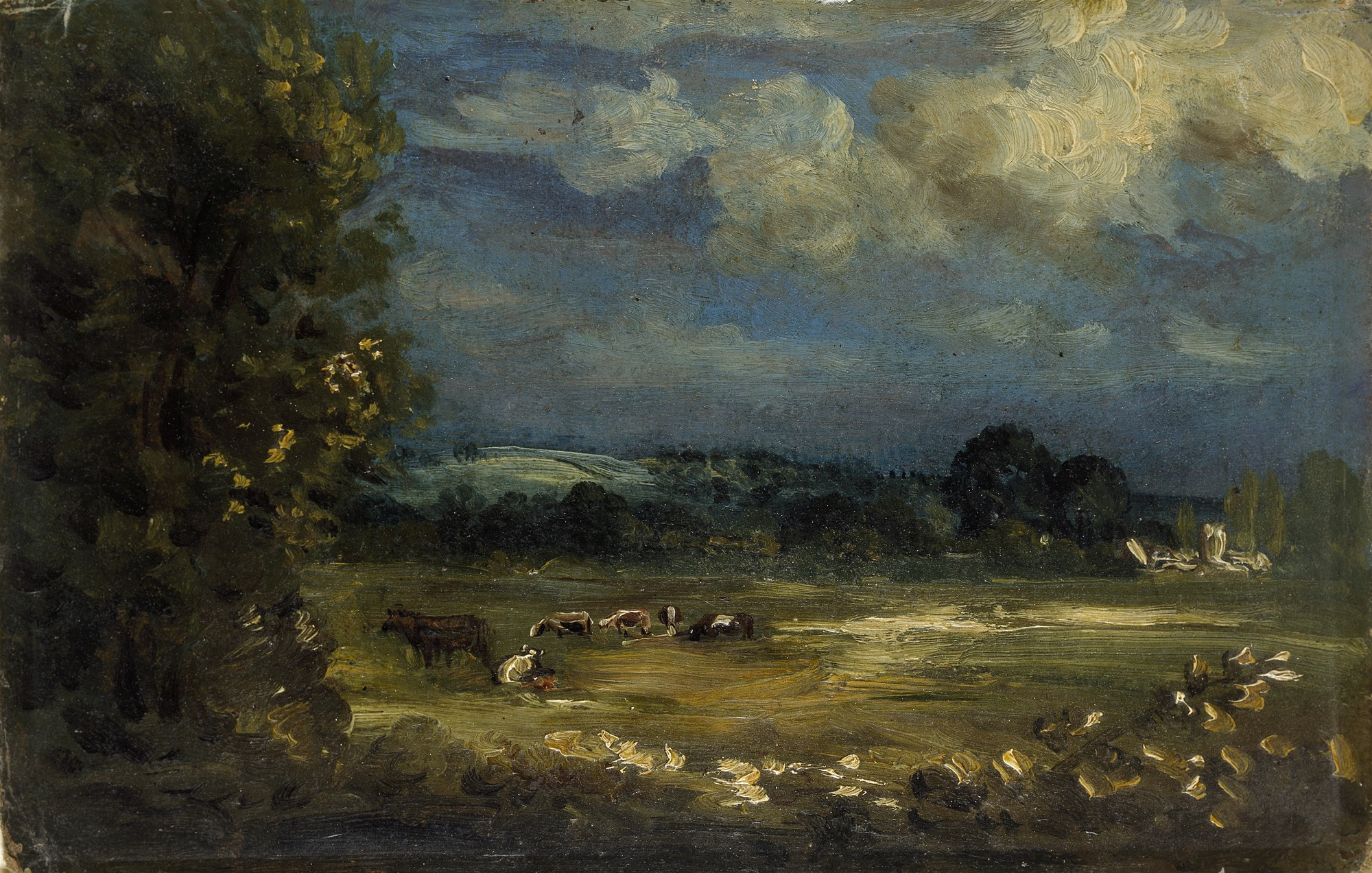
David Charles Read, 1835 oil landscape of Britford Water Meadows

In early days, Read engraved plates for a Pilgrim's Progress published by William Sharp at Romsey (1816–17), and other works. He worked mainly in the open air. In 1826, he began etching, and produced plates to 1844: the total number of his etchings is 237. Sixteen of those were portraits; the rest are landscapes. Technically, Read's work is interesting from the use of dry-point, unusual with English etchers of the period.

Read sent his earliest plates to be printed in London, but then obtained a press and made the impressions. Six series of etchings were published by him between 1829 and 1845. The fifth of these (1840) was a series of thirteen views of the English lakes. The remainder were selected from his miscellaneous works. Two series were dedicated to Queen Adelaide. In 1845, he destroyed 63 of the plates; the rest were destroyed by his family after his death.

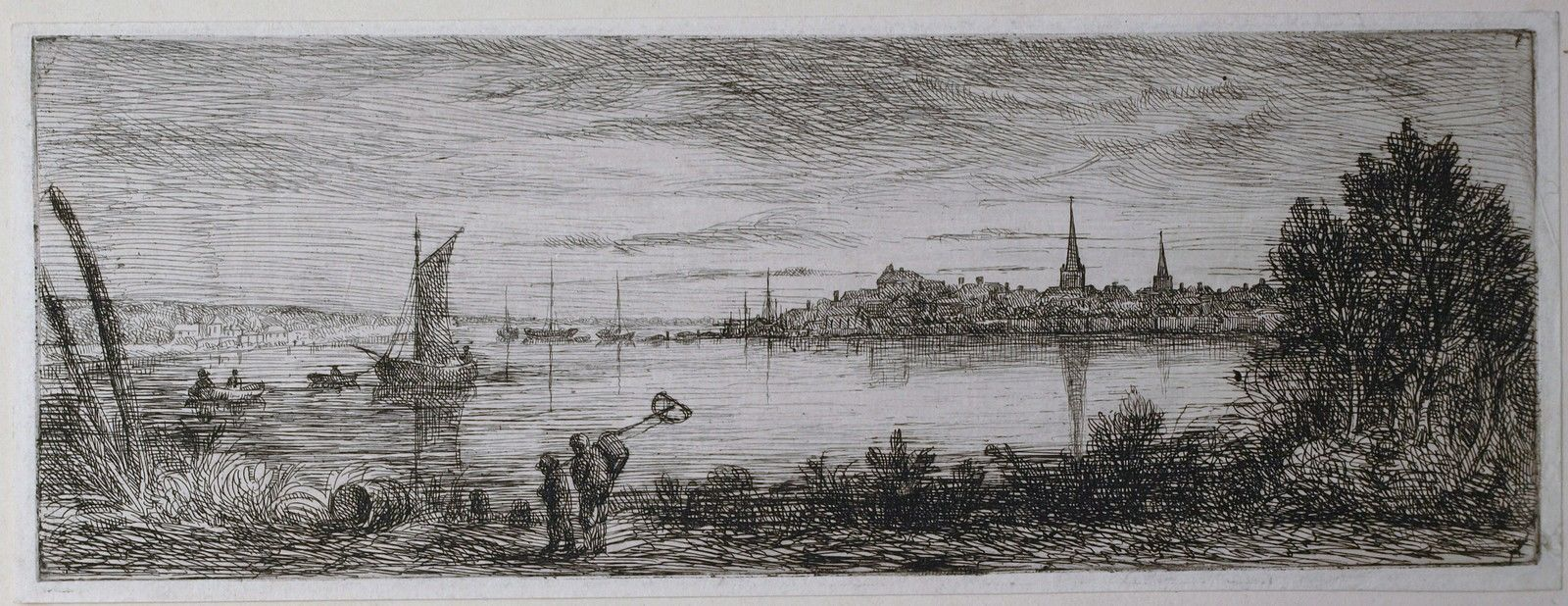
David Charles Read (1790-1851) Etching of River mouth with figures & boats (number 69)

On his return from Italy, Read concentrated on painting in oils, producing some pictures for Dr. Coope between 1846 and 1849, though he did not exhibit after 1840. Between 1823 and 1840, he sent one landscape to the Royal Academy, seven to the British Institution, and six to the Suffolk Street Gallery.

Read etched his own portrait from a water-colour sketch by John Linnell (1819). A short catalogue of the etchings was printed at Salisbury in 1832. An exhaustive manuscript catalogue, with a memoir of the artist, compiled (1871–4) by his son, Raphael W. Read, F.R.C.S., went to the print-room at the British Museum.

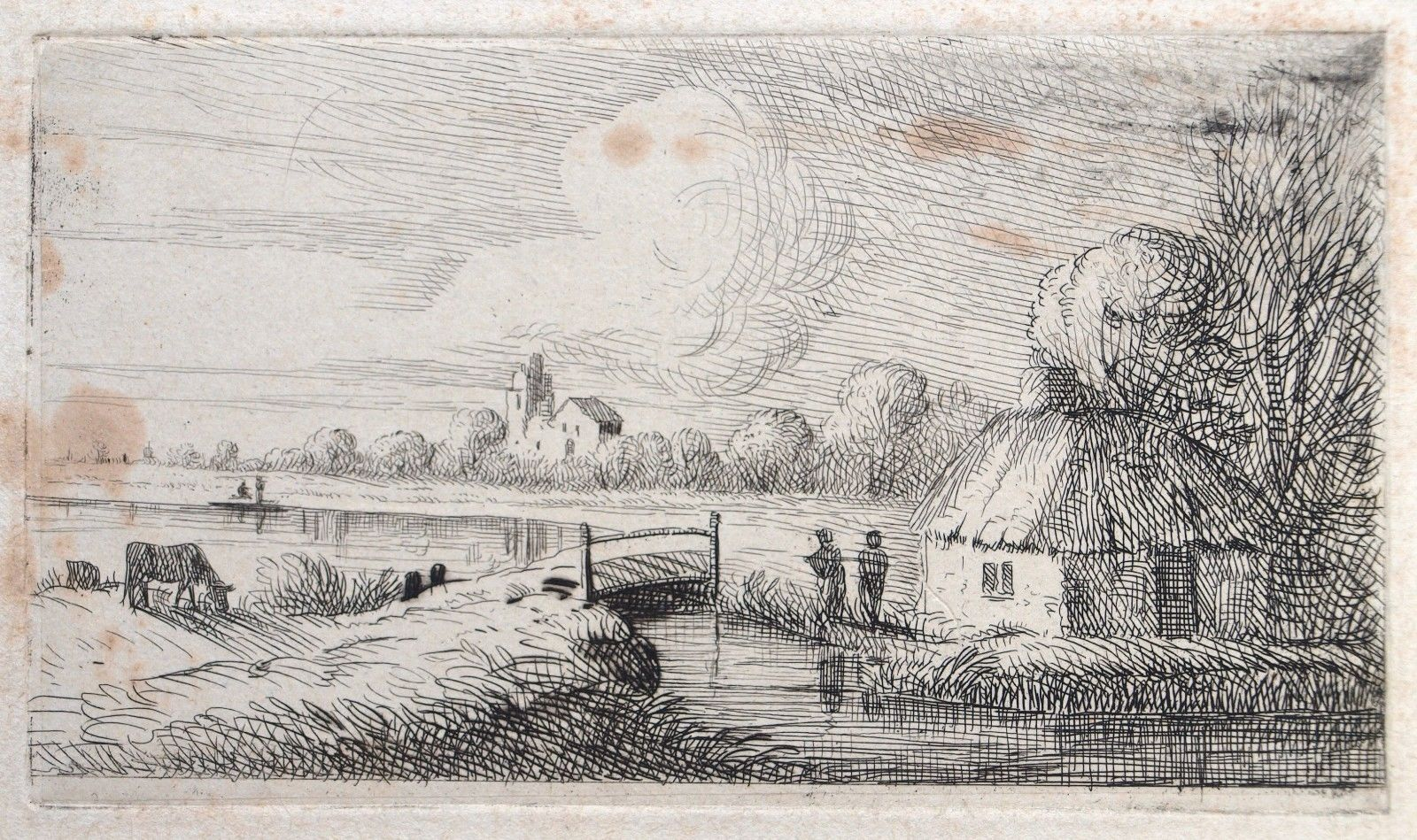

== Legacy ==
Read presented to the British Museum in 1833 and 1842 two volumes containing 168 of his etchings. Another collection, formed by his patron Chambers Hall, went to the university galleries, Oxford, and then to the Ashmolean Museum; a third was at Bridgewater House, collected by Francis Egerton, 1st Earl of Ellesmere.
