= Portrait of Robert Southey =

Painting by John Opie

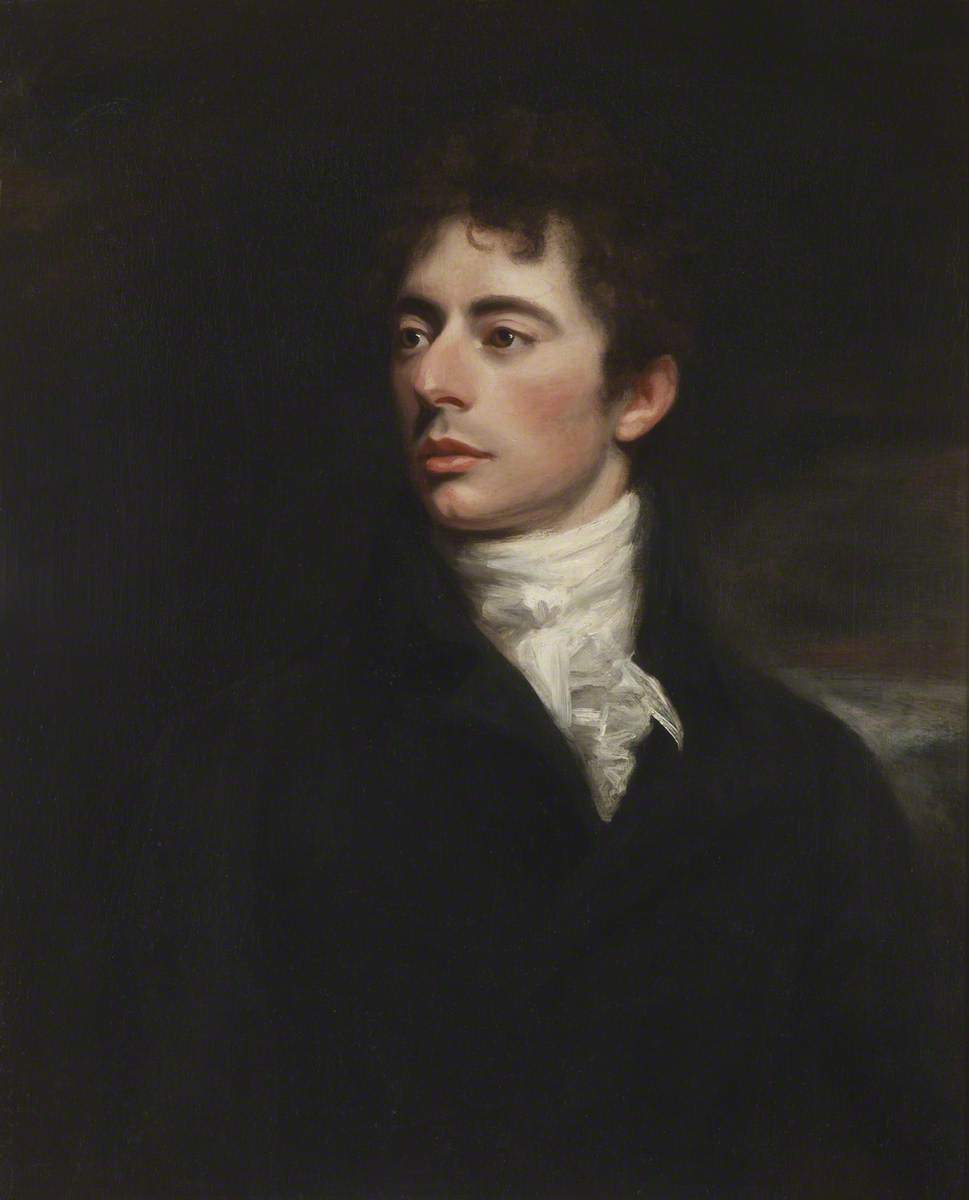
- Artist: John Opie
- Year: 1806
- Type: Oil on canvas, portrait painting
- Dimensions: 91 cm × 78 cm (36 in × 31 in)
- Location: Keswick Museum; Cumbria

Portrait of Robert Southey is an 1806 portrait painting by the British artist John Opie. It depicts the English writer Robert Southey at the age of thirty one. Southey, one of the Lake Poets of the Romantic movement, later became Poet Laureate.

Southey commissioned the work from the Cornish-born Opie one of the leading portraitists of the era. Today it is in the Keswick Museum in Cumbria. An engraving based on the portrait was produced by William Henry Egleton, a copy of which is now in the National Portrait Gallery in London.

== Bibliography ==
- Earland, Ada. John Opie and His Circle. Hutchinson & Company, 1911.
- Speck, William Arthur. Robert Southey: Entire Man of Letters. Yale University Press, 2006.
