= Chambers Hall =

English art collector (1786–1855)

Chambers Hall (1786–1855) was an English collector of drawings, bronzes, and other works of art. The son of William Hall, a naval captain of the East India Company, he lived at Elmfield Lodge, Southampton, and died on 29 August 1855 in Bury Street, St. James's, London. He was a patron of artists, including David Charles Read.

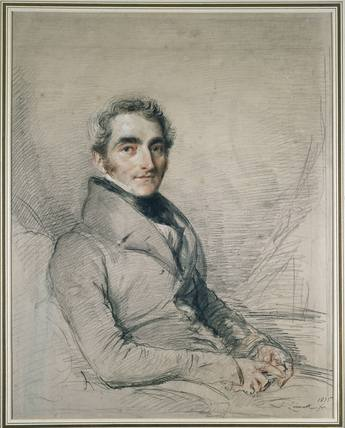
Chambers Hall, 1835 drawing by John Linnell

== Legacy ==
In 1855, a few months before his death, Hall presented to the British Museum a group of 66 drawings by Thomas Girtin, and antiquities including bronzes. To the University of Oxford he gave at the same time the rest of his collections, including drawings by Raphael, a portrait of Mrs. Bradyll by Sir John Reynolds, a portrait of James Thornhill and sketches by William Hogarth, and a painting from Herculaneum. Other works in the gift included bronzes, and a portrait of himself by John Linnell.

== Notes ==
Attribution

This article incorporates text from a publication now in the public domain: Stephen, Leslie; Lee, Sidney, eds. (1890). "Hall, Chambers". Dictionary of National Biography. Vol. 24. London: Smith, Elder & Co.
