= Boadicea Haranguing the Britons =

Painting by John Opie

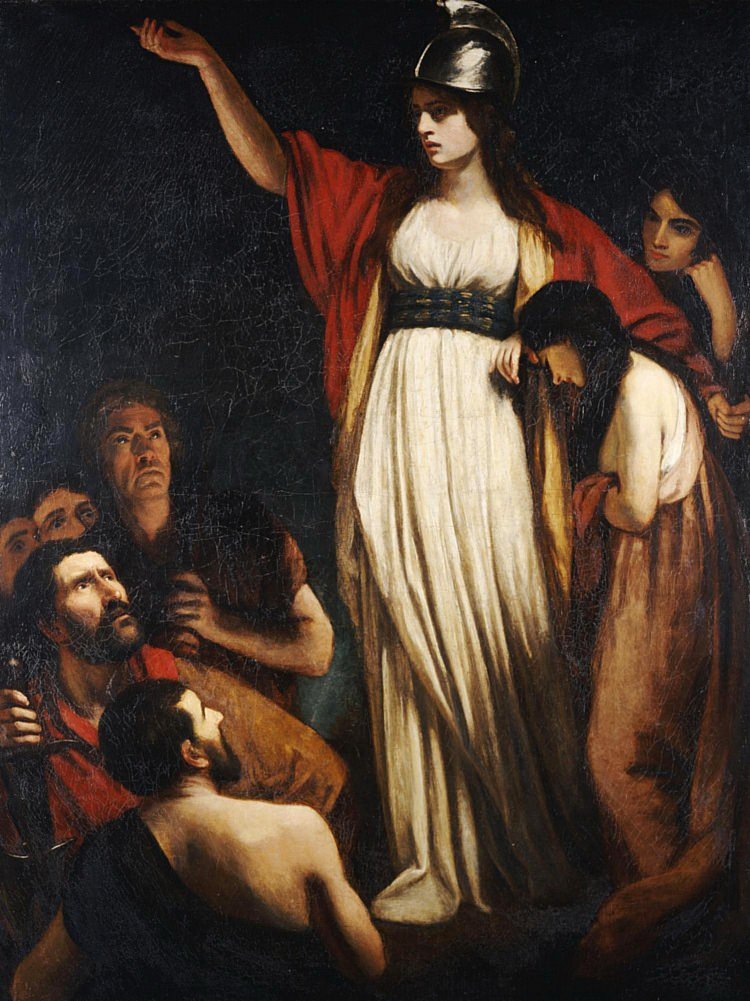
- Artist: John Opie
- Year: 1793
- Type: Oil on canvas, history painting
- Dimensions: 216 cm × 162.5 cm (85 in × 64.0 in)
- Location: Private collection

Boadicea Haranguing the Britons is an oil on canvas history painting by the British artist John Opie, from 1793. It is held in a private collection.

== History and description ==
It depicts Boudica, the queen of the Ancient British Iceni tribe who led an ultimately unsuccessful uprising against the Roman Empire during the first century.

She is portrayed in a white robe and red cloak, a bright figure in an overall dark composition. She is wearing a helmet, showing her role as a military leader. Her two daughters shelter behind her for protection, one looking down, as she speaks, rallying her supporters. Those shown are five in number and are listening attentively to her speech. Her poised aristocratic classical manner contrasts to the depiction of her as a battlefield warrior in Henry Courtney Selous's 1840 painting of the same title.

An engraving based on Opie's painting produced by William Sharp is now in the National Portrait Gallery.

== Bibliography ==
- Gillespie, Caitlin C. Boudica: Warrior Woman of Roman Britain. Oxford University Press, 2018.
- James, Sharon L. & Dillon, Sheila. (ed.) A Companion to Women in the Ancient World. John Wiley & Sons, 2015.
