= Thomas Girtin =

British artist (1775–1802)

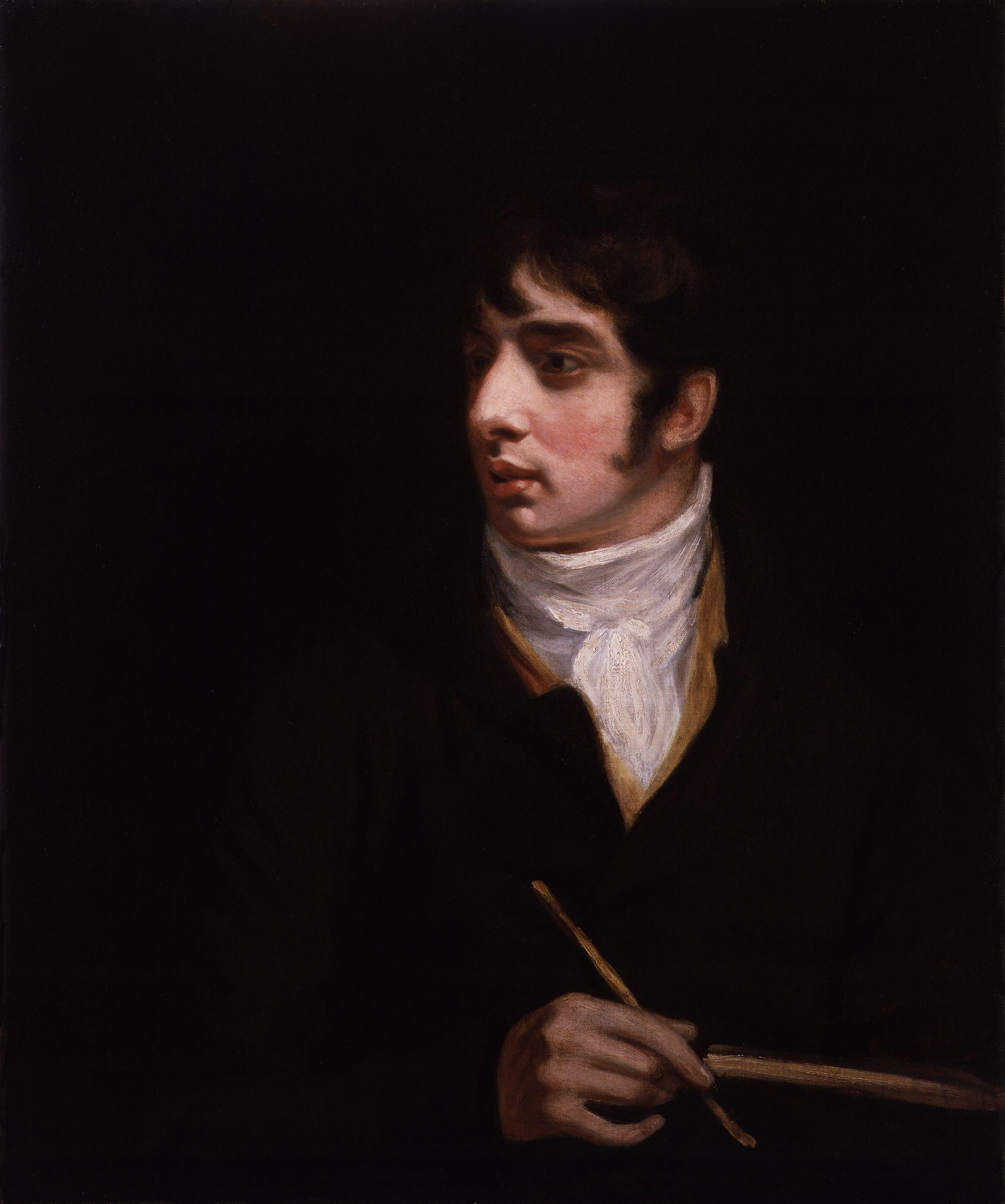
Portrait of Thomas Girtin by John Opie, 1800. National Portrait Gallery, London.

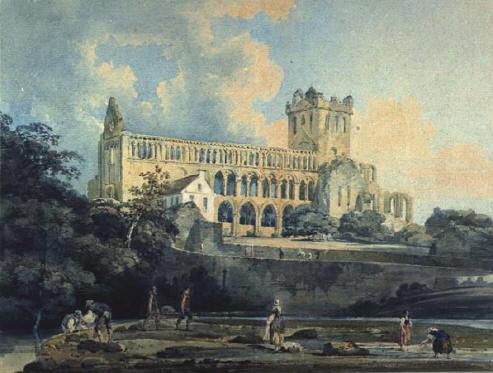
Jedburgh Abbey from the River (1798-99, watercolour on paper).

Thomas Girtin (18 February 1775 – 9 November 1802) was an English watercolourist and etcher. A friend and rival of J. M. W. Turner, Girtin played a key role in establishing watercolour as a reputable art form.

== Life ==
Thomas Girtin was born in Southwark, London, the son of a wealthy brushmaker of Huguenot descent. His father died while he was a child, and his mother then married a Mr Vaughan, a pattern-draughtsman. Girtin learnt drawing as a boy (attending classes with Thomas Malton), and was apprenticed to the topographical watercolourist Edward Dayes. Girtin is believed to have served out his seven-year term, although there are unconfirmed reports of clashes between master and apprentice, and even that Dayes had Girtin imprisoned as a refractory apprentice. Dayes did not appreciate his pupil's talent, and he was to write dismissively of Girtin after his death.

While a teenager, Girtin became friends with the young J. M. W. Turner. The boys were employed to colour prints with watercolours. Girtin exhibited at the Royal Academy from 1794. His architectural and topographical sketches and drawings established his reputation, his use of watercolour for landscapes being such as to give him the credit of having created Romantic watercolour painting. He went on sketching tours, visiting the north of England, North Wales and the West Country. By 1799, he had acquired influential patrons such as Lady Sutherland and the art collector Sir George Beaumont. Girtin was the dominant member of the Brothers, a sketching society of professional artists and talented amateurs.

In 1800, Girtin married Mary Ann Borrett, the 16-year-old daughter of a wealthy City goldsmith, and set up home in St George's Row, Hyde Park, next door to the painter Paul Sandby. By 1801, by this time suffering from deteriorating health, he was a welcome houseguest at his patrons' country houses such as Harewood House and Mulgrave Castle, and able to charge 20 guineas for a painting.

In late 1801 to early 1802, Girtin spent five and a half months in Paris, where he painted watercolours. He made a series the pencil sketches that he engraved on his return to London, and which were posthumously published as Twenty Views in Paris and its Environs. In 1802, Girtin produced a panorama of London, the "Eidometropolis", 5.5 metres (18 ft) high and 33 metres (108 ft) in circumference, which was exhibited that year. It was noted for its naturalistic treatment of urban light and atmosphere. In November 1802, Girtin died in his painting room; the cause was variously reported as asthma, consumption, or "ossification of the heart." He was buried in the churchyard of St Paul's, Covent Garden in London.

== Style and technique ==
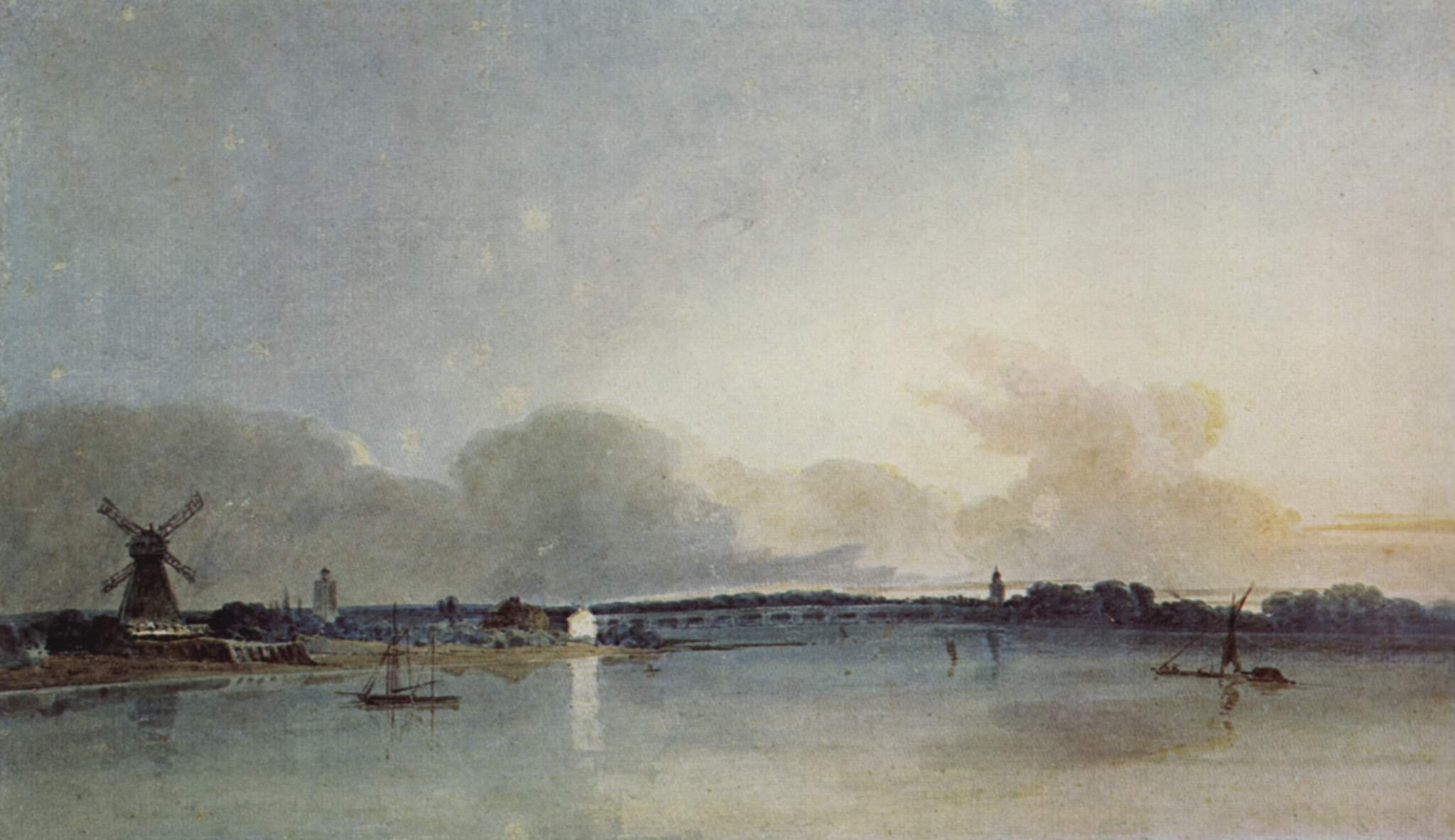
The White House at Chelsea (1800), Tate Britain

Girtin's early landscapes are akin to 18th-century topographical sketches, but in later years he developed a bolder, more spacious, romantic style, which had a lasting influence on English painting. The scenery of the north encouraged him to create a new watercolour palette of warm browns, slate greys, indigo and purple. He abandoned the practice of undershadowing in grey wash and then adding pastel patches of colour, in favour of broad washes of strong colour, and experimented with the use of pen, brown ink and varnish to add richer tones. Girtin's early death reportedly caused Turner to remark, "Had Tom Girtin lived I should have starved." His most celebrated work, much admired by Turner, was The White House at Chelsea (1800).

=== Exhibitions and retrospectives ===
The British Museum and the Victoria and Albert Museum have collections of Girtin's works. The British Museum was given watercolours by the collector Chambers Hall. In July 2002 Tate Britain organised an exhibition, Thomas Girtin: The Art of Watercolour which aimed to "reveal his technical genius". An online catalogue raisonné of the artist, edited by Greg Smith, was published by the Paul Mellon Centre for Studies in British Art in 2022.

== Gallery ==
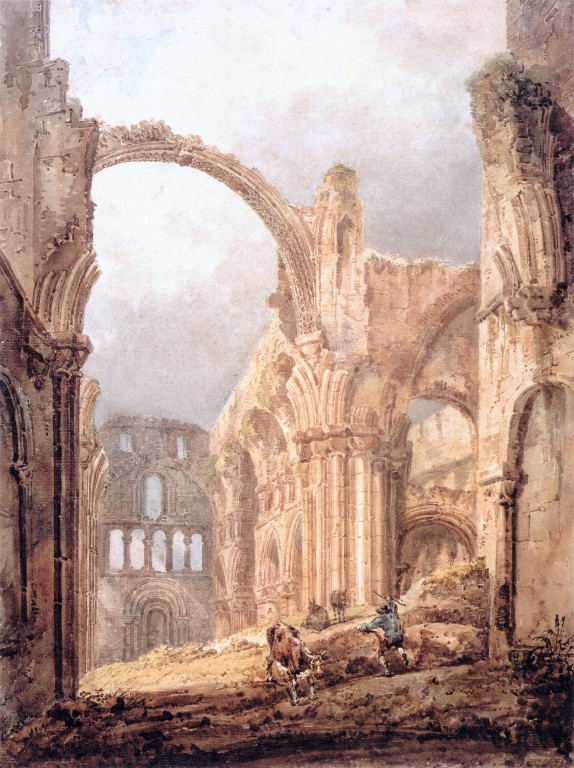
Interior of Lindisfarne Priory (1797)

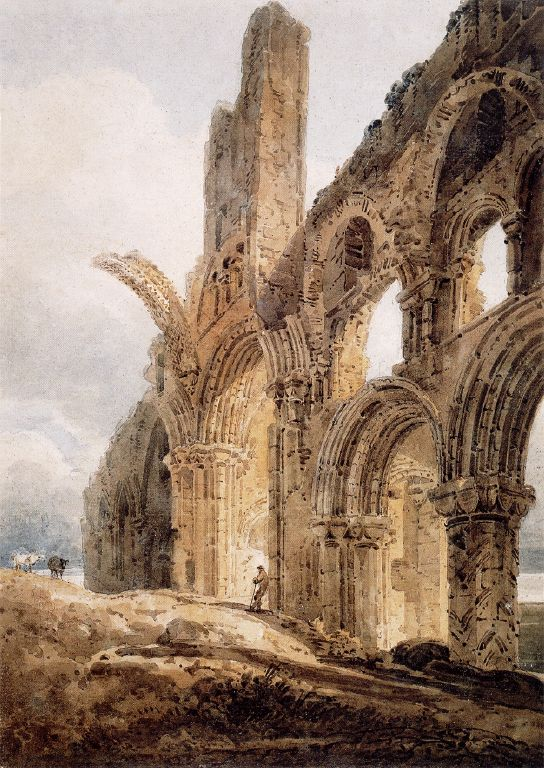
Lindisfarne (1798)

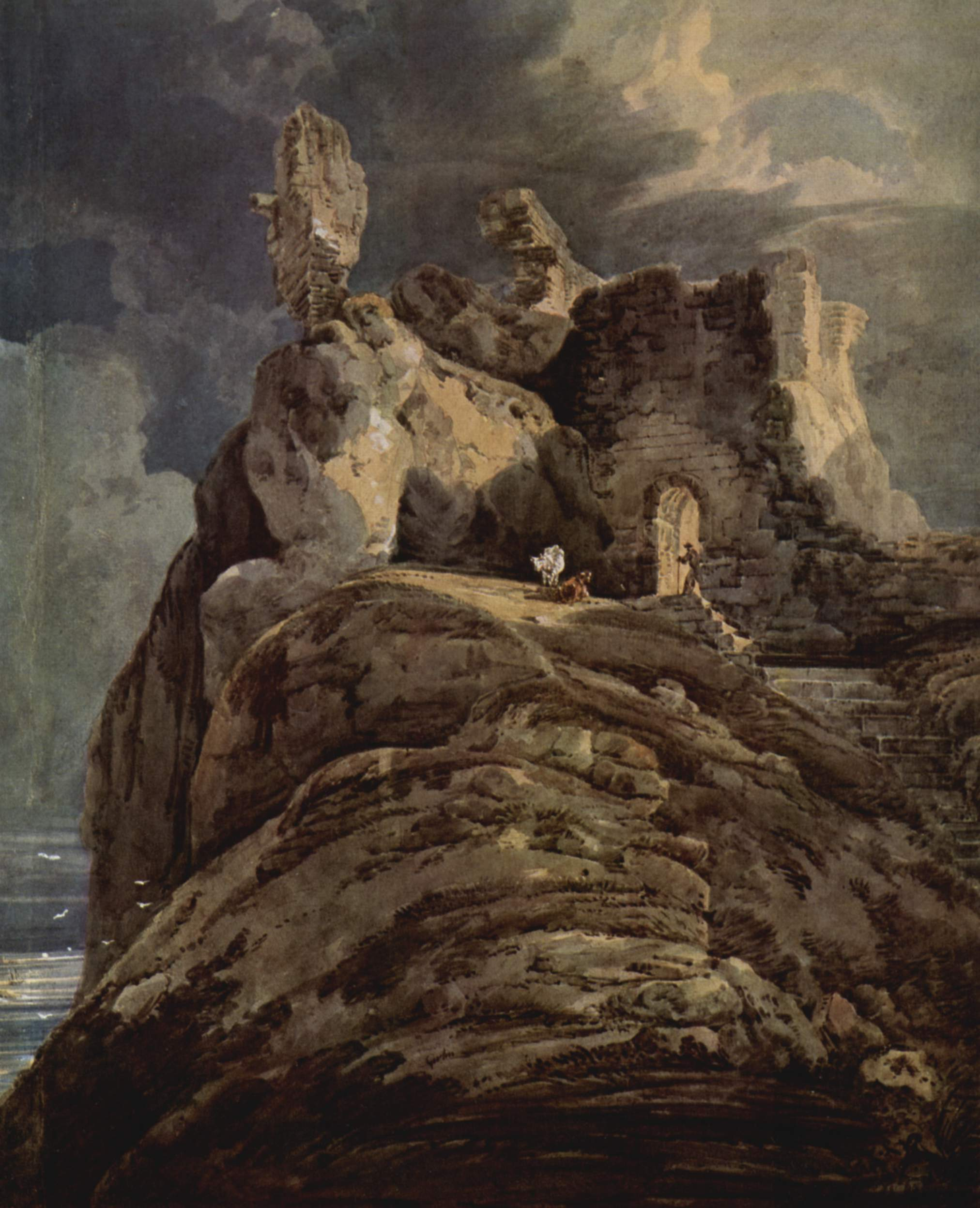
Bamburgh Castle, Northumberland (~1797-1799)

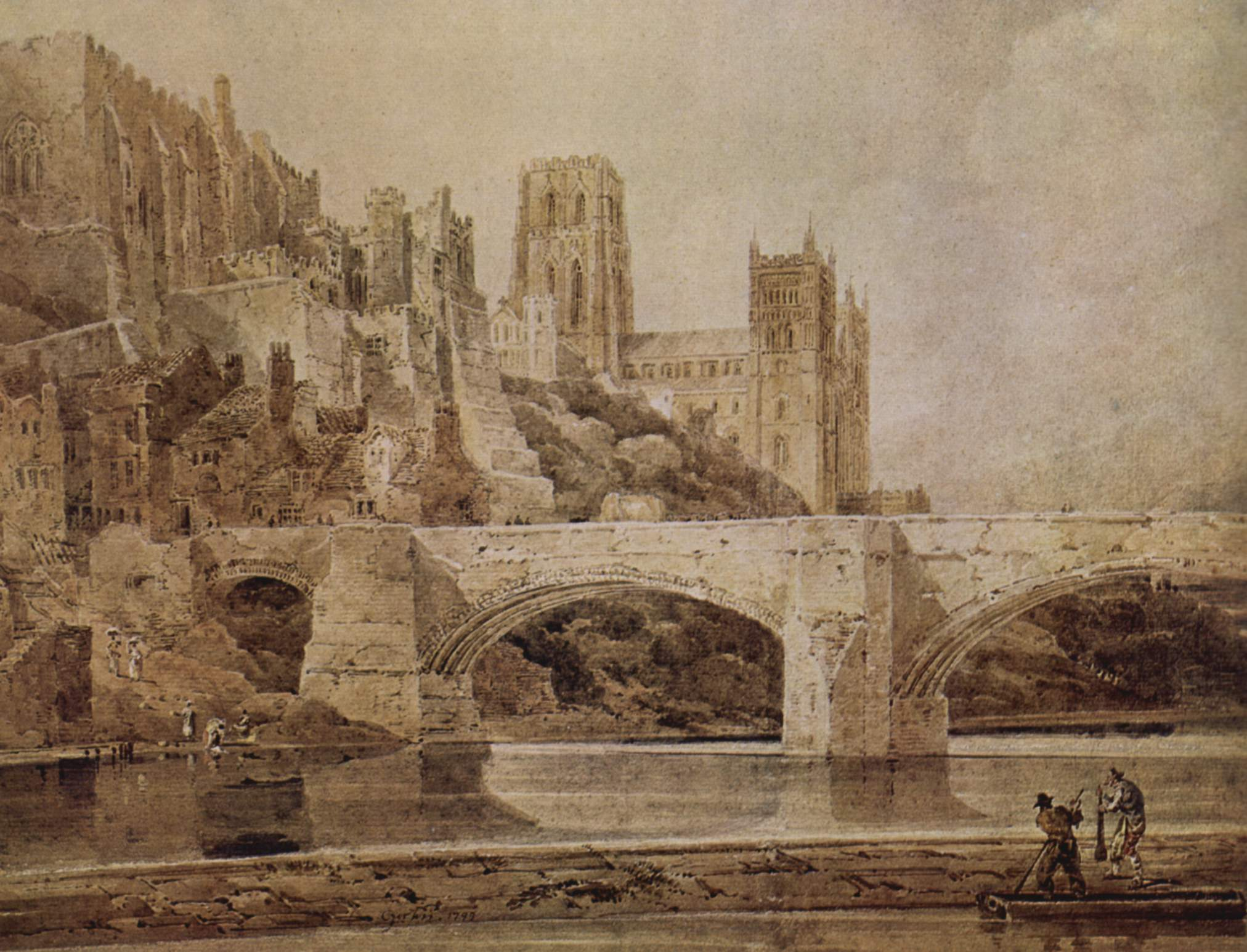
Durham Cathedral and Bridge (1799)

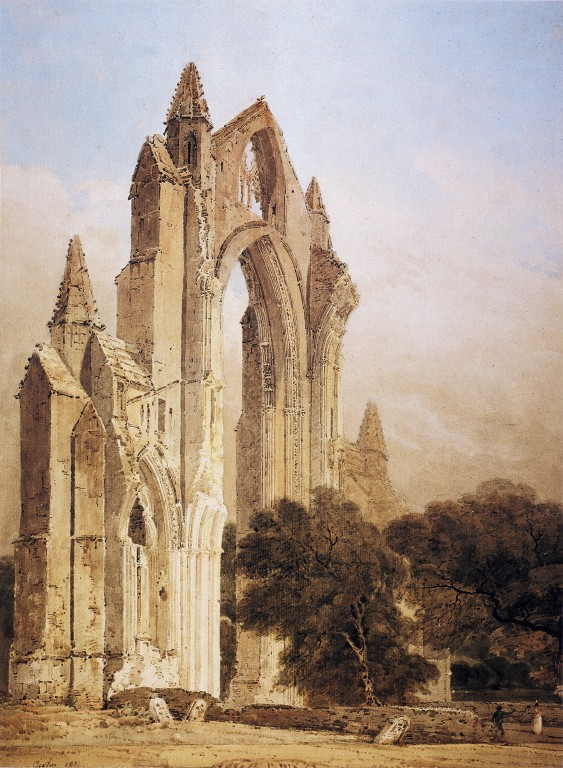
Guisborough Priory, Yorkshire (1801)

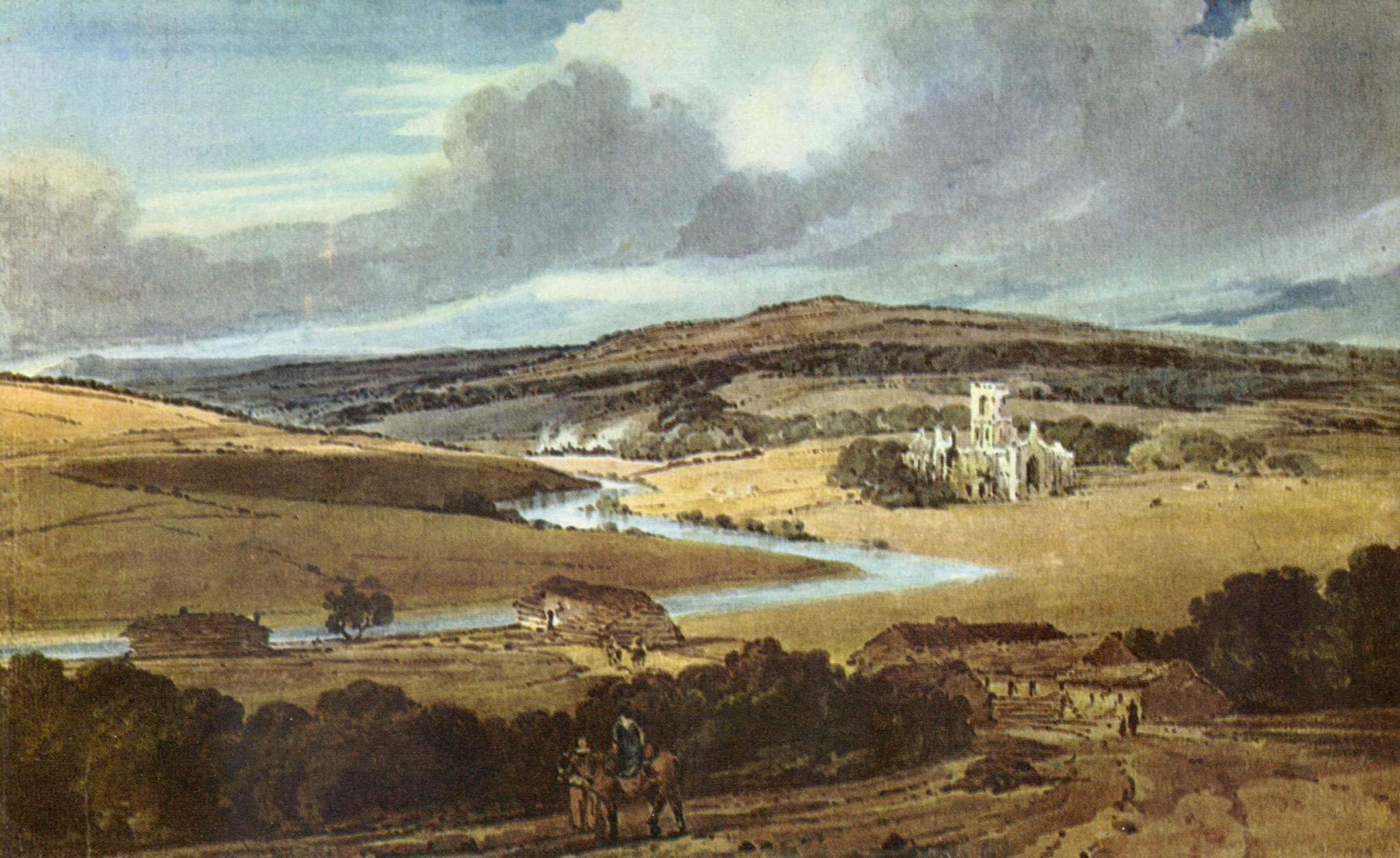
Kirkstall Abbey, Yorkshire (1801)

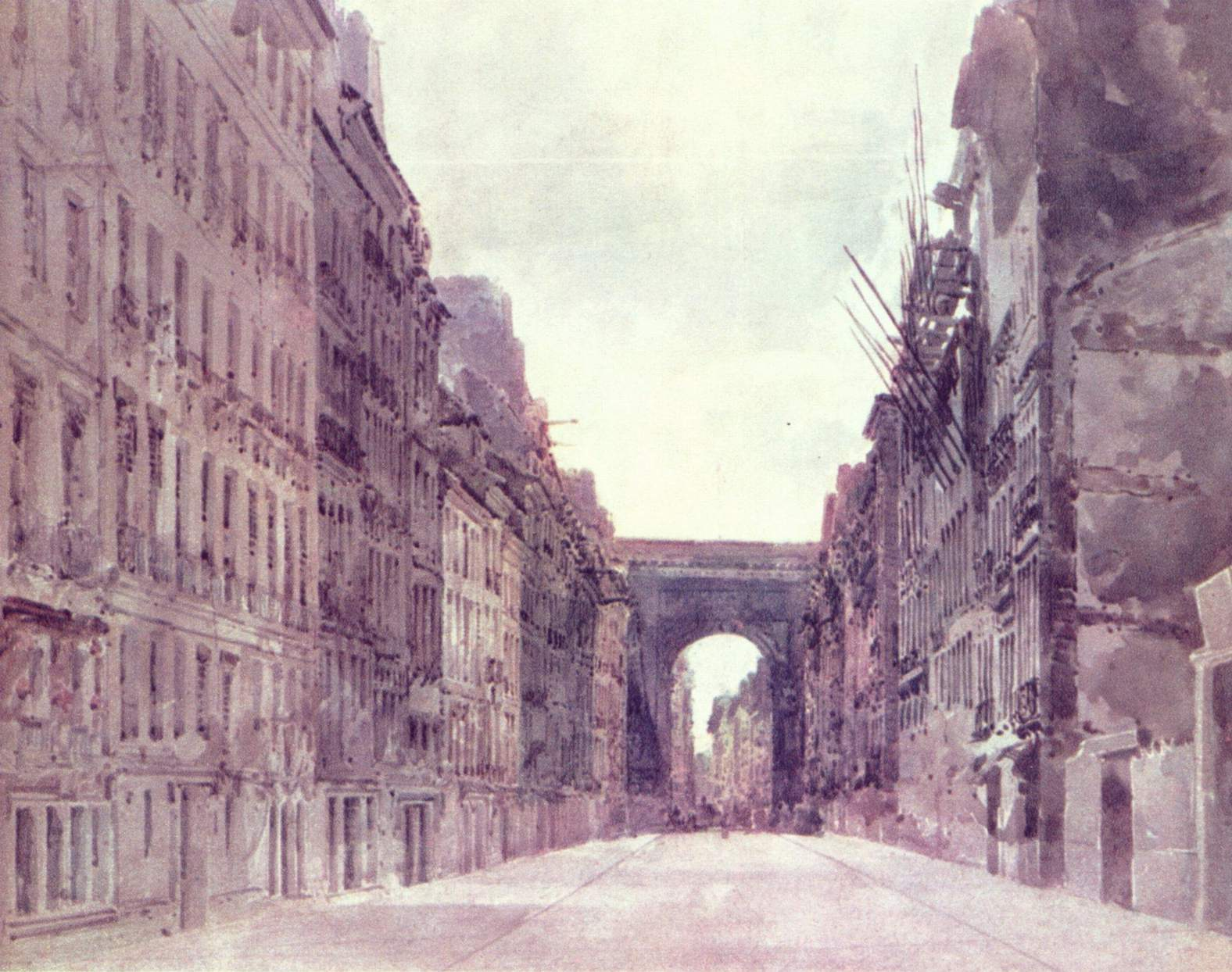
Rue Saint-Denis in Paris (1802)

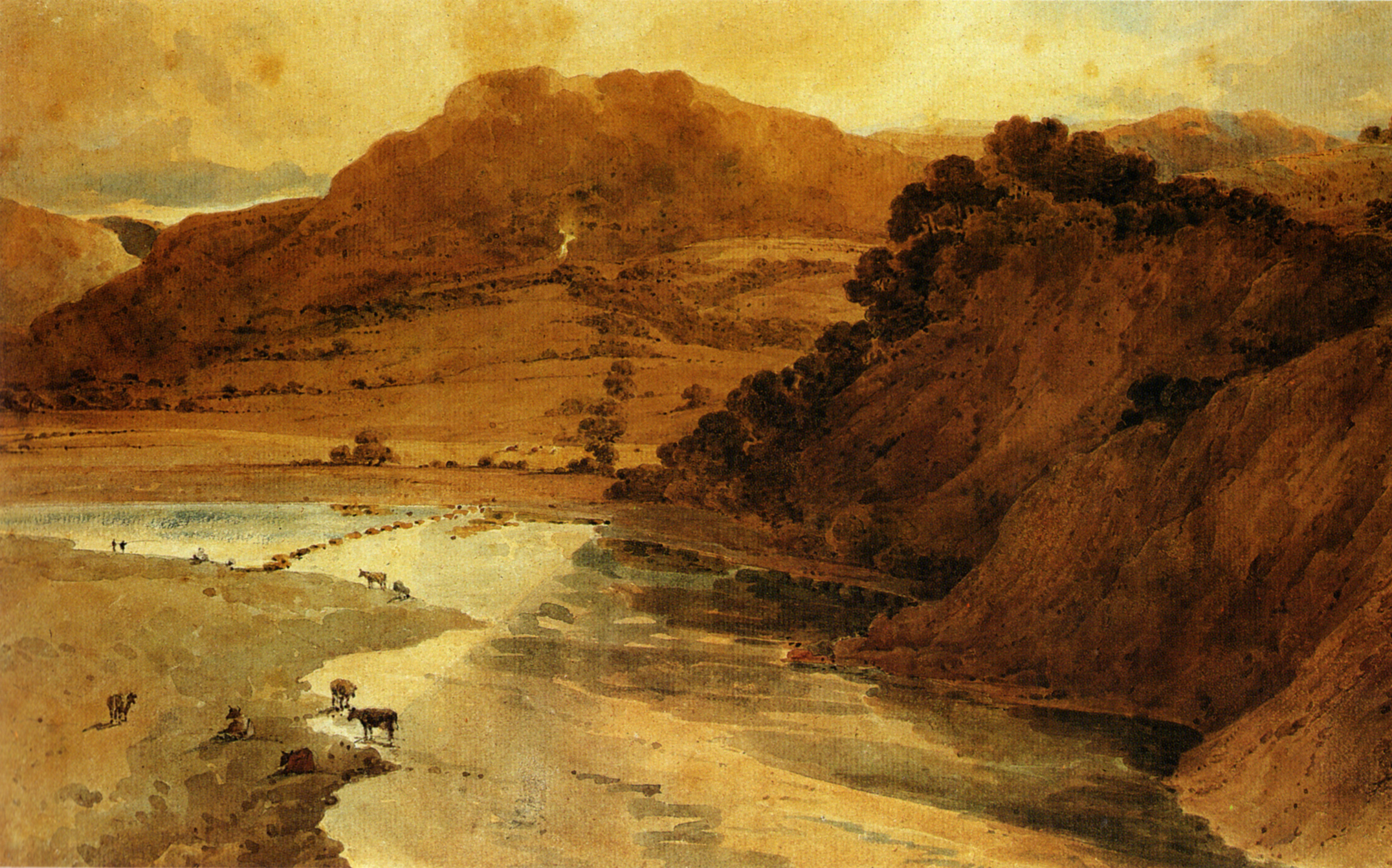
Near Bolton Abbey, Yorkshire

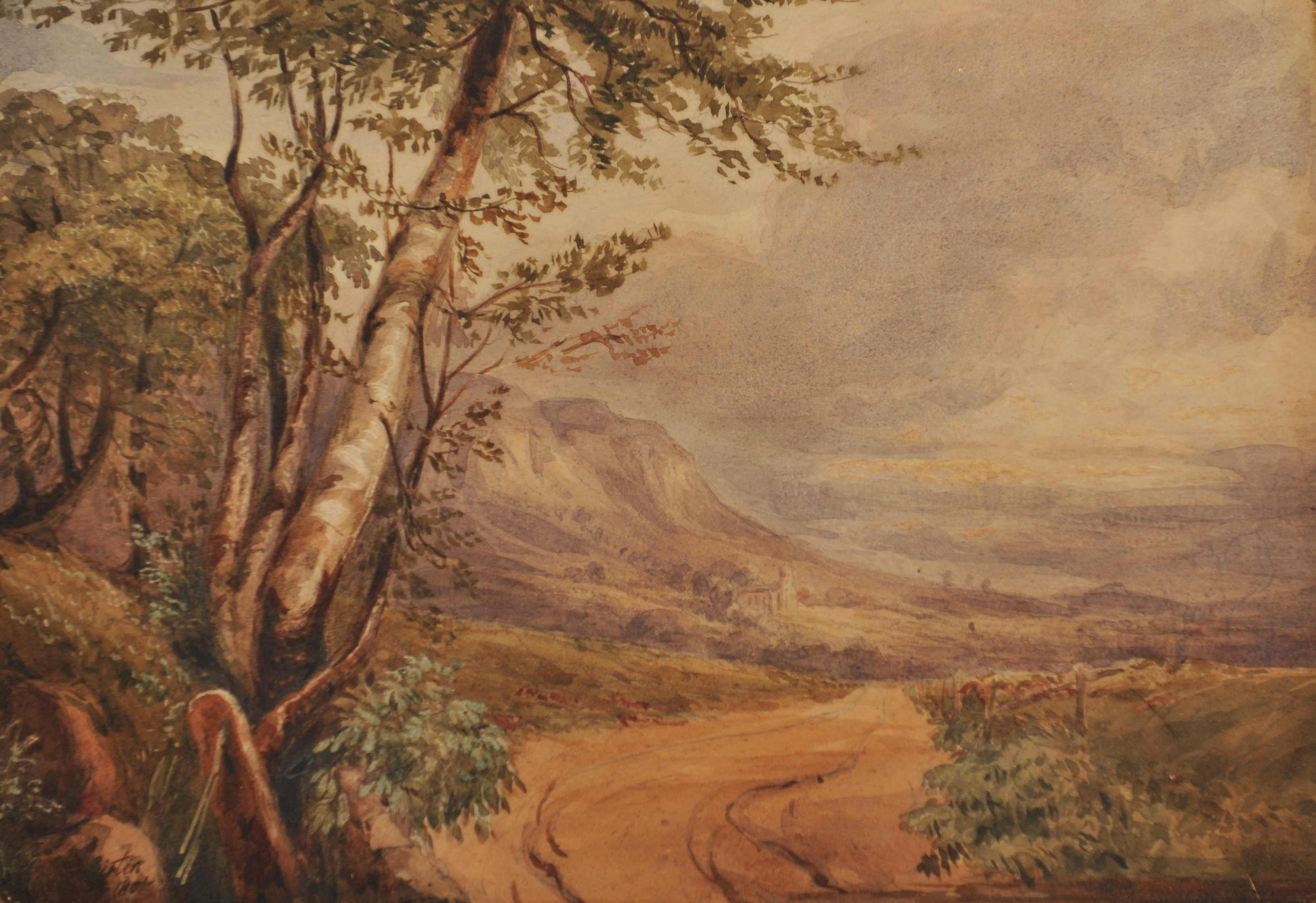
In the Scotch Borders (near Jedburgh) (1801)

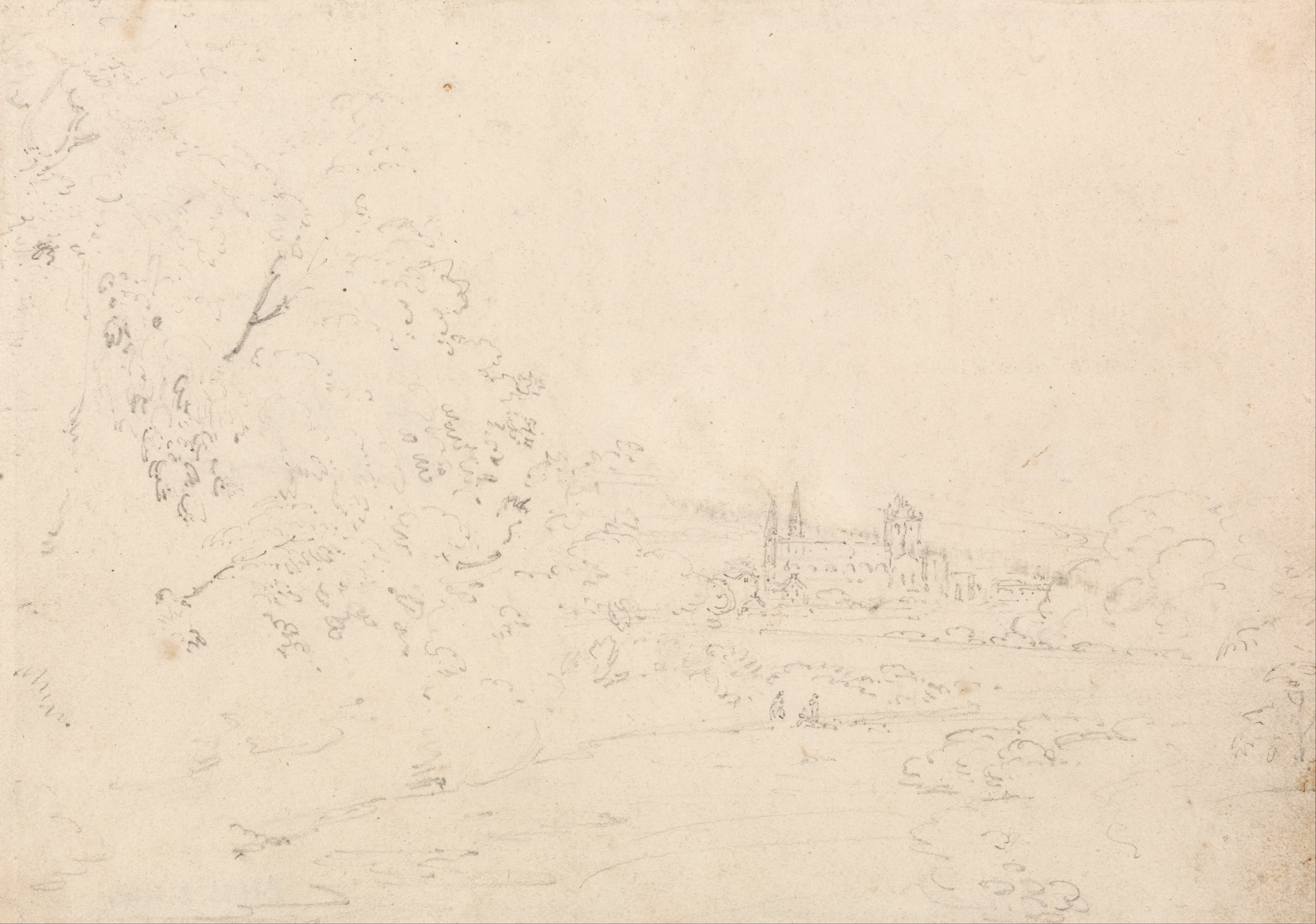
Sketch near Jedburgh

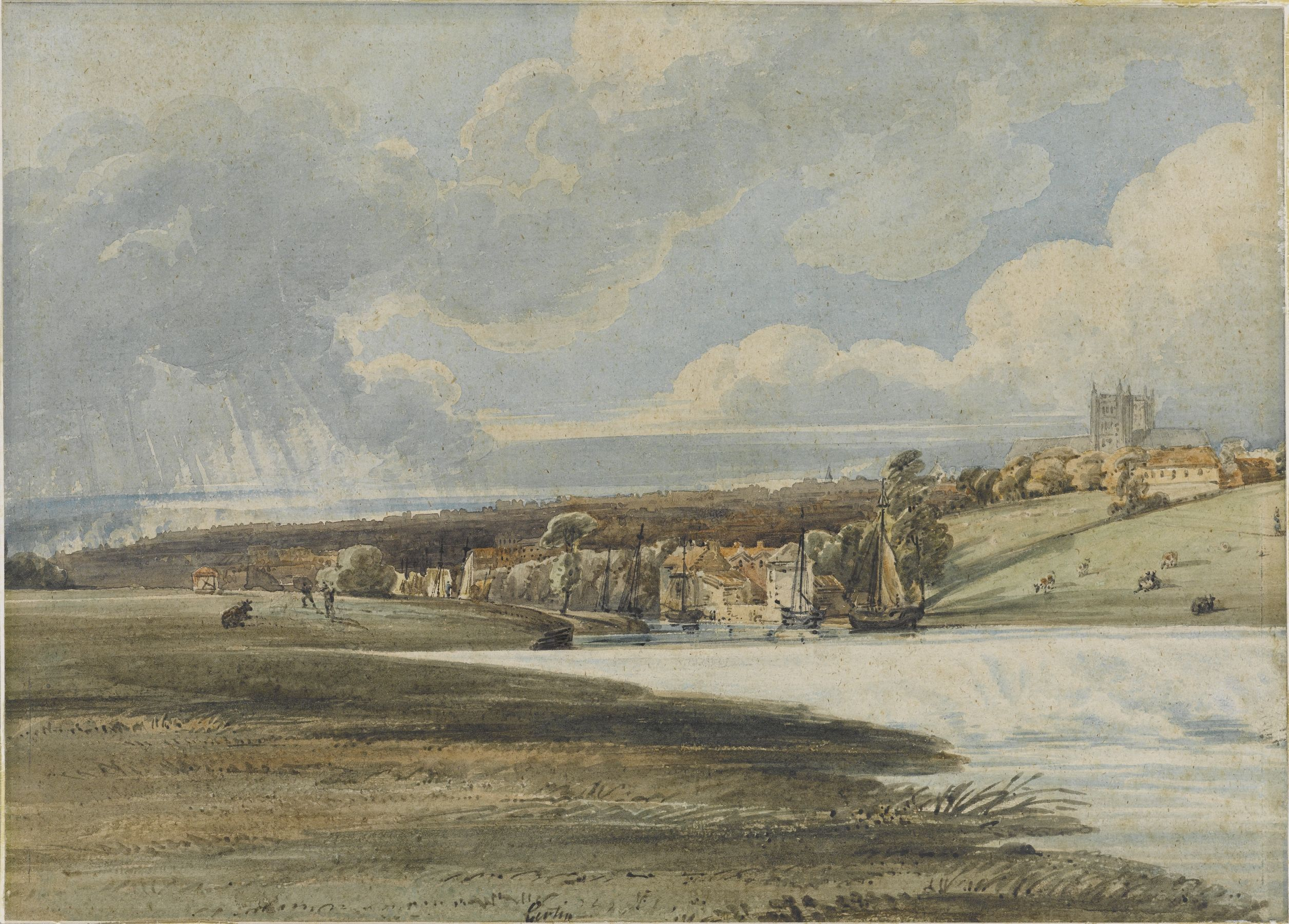
Exeter from Trew’s Weir circa 1799

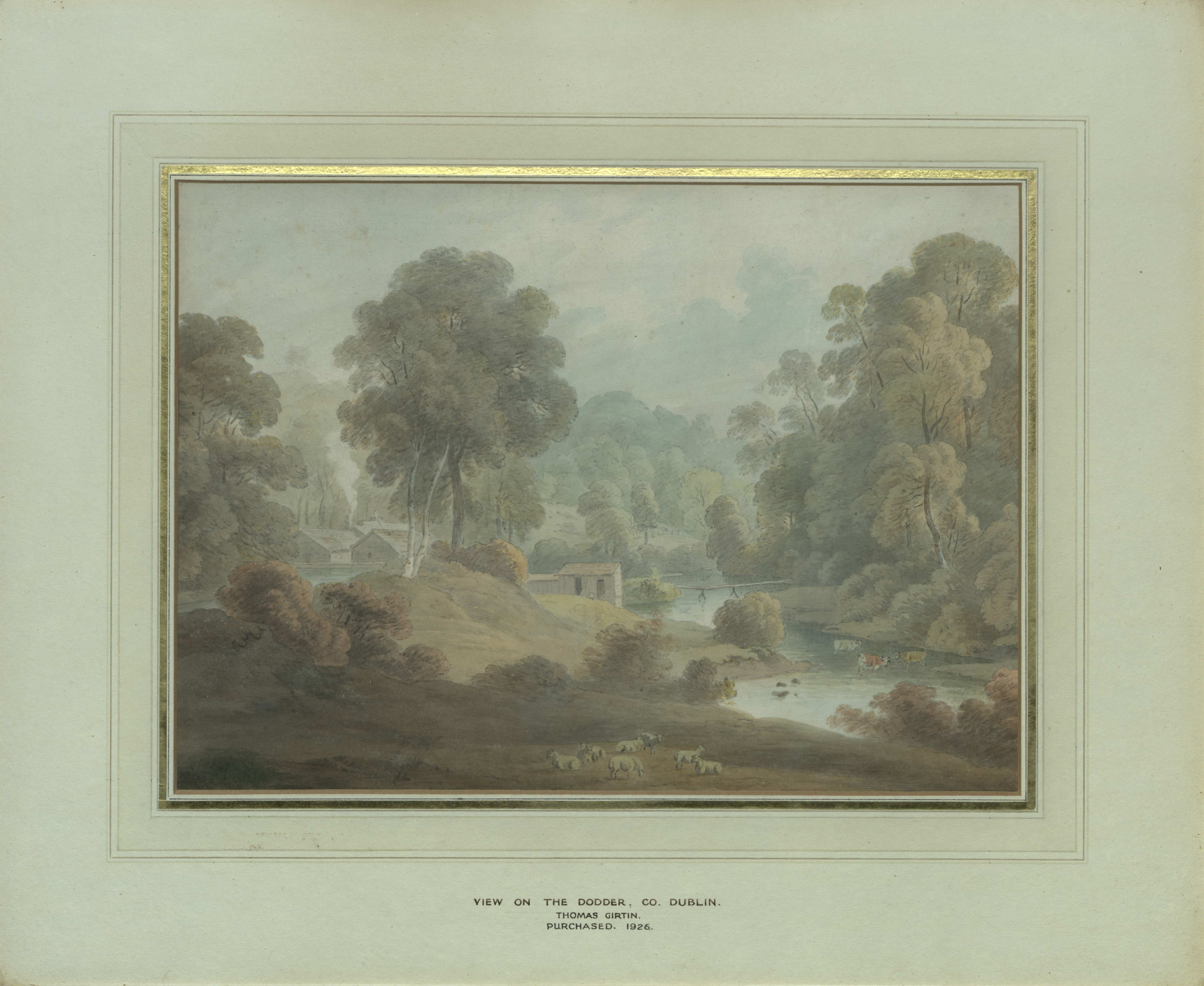
View of the Dodder, Co. Dublin

LOWTHER CASTLE. THOMAS GIRTIN 1775 - 1802. F Leslie Wright Esq

== Sources ==
- Morris, Susan (2004). "Girtin, Thomas". Oxford Dictionary of National Biography (online ed.). Oxford University Press. doi:10.1093/ref:odnb/10777. (Subscription, Wikipedia Library access or UK public library membership required.)

=== Further reading ===
- Egerton, Judy (1979). English Watercolour Painting. Oxford: Phaidon. ISBN 978-07148-1-963-1 – via Internet Archive.
- Smith, Greg. Thomas Girtin (1775–1802): An Online Catalogue, Archive and Introduction to the Artist (London: Paul Mellon Centre, 2022), doi:10.17658/girtin.
