= John Opie =

British painter (1761–1807)

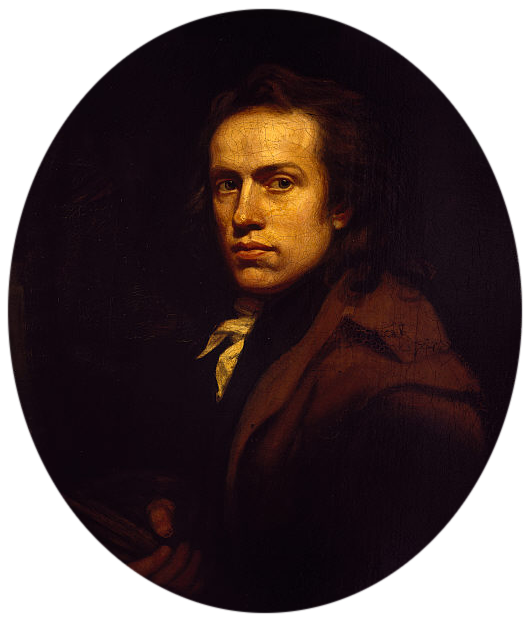
- Self-portrait, 1789
- Born: 16 May 1761; Trevellas, Cornwall
- Died: 9 April 1807 (aged 45); Westminster, London
- Known for: Historical painting, portraits
- Spouse: Amelia Alderson
- Awards: Royal Academician
- Patrons: John Wolcot

John Opie RA (16 May 1761 – 9 April 1807) was a British painter whose subjects included many prominent men and women of his day, members of the British royal family and others who were notable in the artistic and literary careers.

== Early career ==
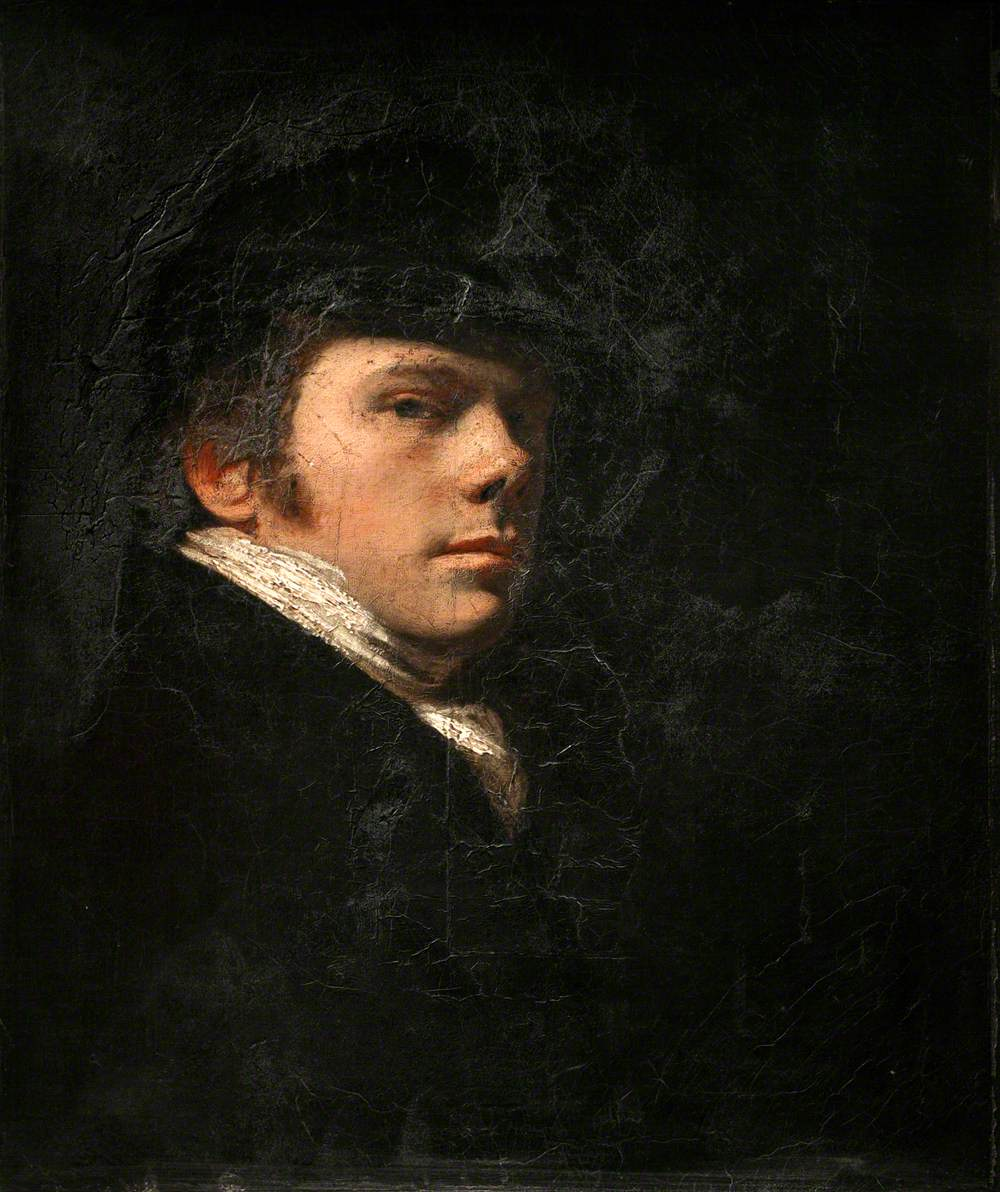
Self Portrait, John Opie (n.d.)

Opie was born in Harmony Cottage, Trevellas, between St Agnes and Perranporth in Cornwall, UK. He was the youngest of the five children of Edward Opie, a master carpenter, and his wife Mary (née Tonkin). He showed a precocious talent for drawing and mathematics, and by the age of twelve, he had mastered Euclid and opened an evening school for poor children where he taught reading, writing, and arithmetic. His father, however, did not encourage his abilities, and apprenticed him to his own trade of carpentry.

Opie's artistic abilities eventually came to the attention of local physician and satirist, Dr John Wolcot (Peter Pindar), who visited him at the sawmill where he was working in 1775. Recognising a great talent, Wolcot became Opie's mentor, buying him out of his apprenticeship and insisting that he come to live at his home in Truro. Wolcot provided invaluable encouragement, advice, tuition and practical help in the advancement of his early career, including obtaining many commissions for work.

== London ==
In 1781, having gained considerable experience as a portraitist travelling around Cornwall, Opie moved to London with Wolcot. There they lived together, having entered into a formal profit-sharing agreement. Although Opie had received a considerable artistic education from Wolcot, the Doctor chose to present him as a self-taught prodigy; a portrait of a boy shown at the Society of Artists the previous year, had been described in the catalogue as "an instance of Genius, not having ever seen a picture." Wolcot introduced the "Cornish wonder" to leading artists, including Sir Joshua Reynolds, who was to compare him to Caravaggio and Velazquez, and to prospective patrons. The business arrangement with Wolcot lasted for a year, after which Opie informed the doctor that he now wished to go it alone, leading to the estrangement of the two former partners.

Through the influence of "a Mrs Boscawen", Wolcot managed to have Opie introduced at the court of King George III. The King purchased one of his pictures and commissioned him to produce a portrait of Mary Delany. He also received commissions to paint Prince William Frederick, Duke of Gloucester and Edinburgh, both the nephew and son-in-law of the King. Opie also painted the portraits of Lady Salisbury, Lady Charlotte Talbot, Lady Harcourt and other ladies of the court. Opie's residence at "Orange Court", Castle Street, Leicester Fields, was said to be "crowded with rank and fashion every day" and he was the talk of the town. In 1782 he first exhibited at the Royal Academy and in December of that year was married to Mary Bunn. The match, however, proved to be an unhappy one and they were eventually divorced in 1796 after her elopement.

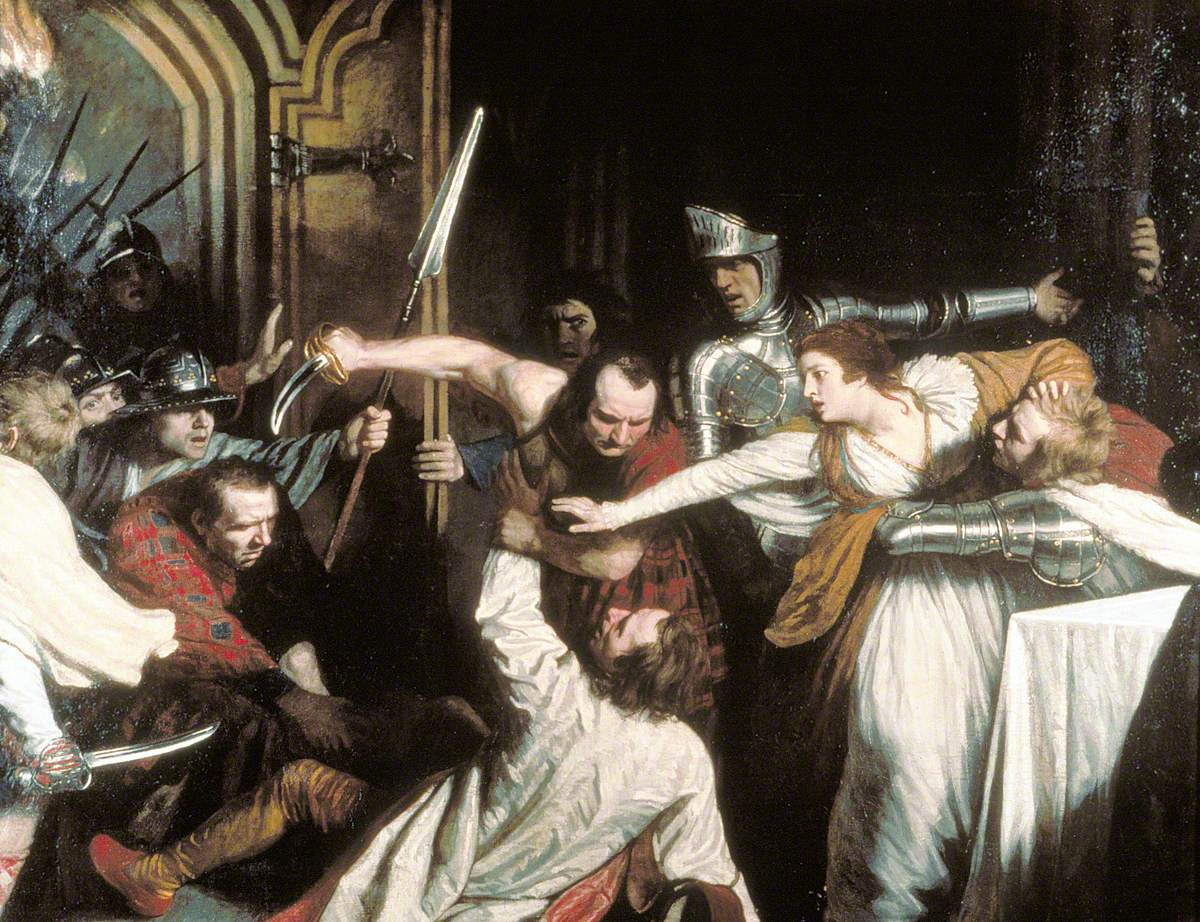
The Murder of Rizzio (1787)

In 1784 Opie exhibited A School, sometimes also known as The Schoolmistress at the Royal Academy (No 162). In 1786 he exhibited his first important historical subject, the Assassination of James I, and in the following year The Death of Rizzio, a work whose merit was recognized by his immediate election as associate of the Royal Academy, of which he became a full member in 1788. He painted five subjects for John Boydell's Shakespeare Gallery; and until his death, his practice alternated between portraiture and historical work. In May 1798 he married Amelia Alderson whom he had met at parties in Norwich, including one at Holkham Hall where he had gone to carry out some commissions for Holkham's owner, Thomas Coke. The commission included doing portraits of Coke's Whig friends. John and Amelia lived at 8 Berners Street, London where Opie had moved in 1791. This proved a happy marriage, lasting for Opie's last nine years of life.

== Reception and society ==
After an initial burst of popularity, Opie's style rapidly fell out of fashion. In response to this he began to work on improving his technique, while at the same time seeking to supplement his early education by the study of Latin, French and English literature, and to polish his provincial manners by mixing in cultivated and learned circles.

Although socially reticent, Opie was part of the "Strawberry Hill Set", the Gothick villa owned by Horace Walpole who would play host to the Blue Stockings Society. Opie painted many of the society's members including Mary Delany, Henry Fuseli, Hannah More, Samuel Johnson, Mary Wollstonecraft and, later on in his career, his own wife Amelia who was associated with the society.

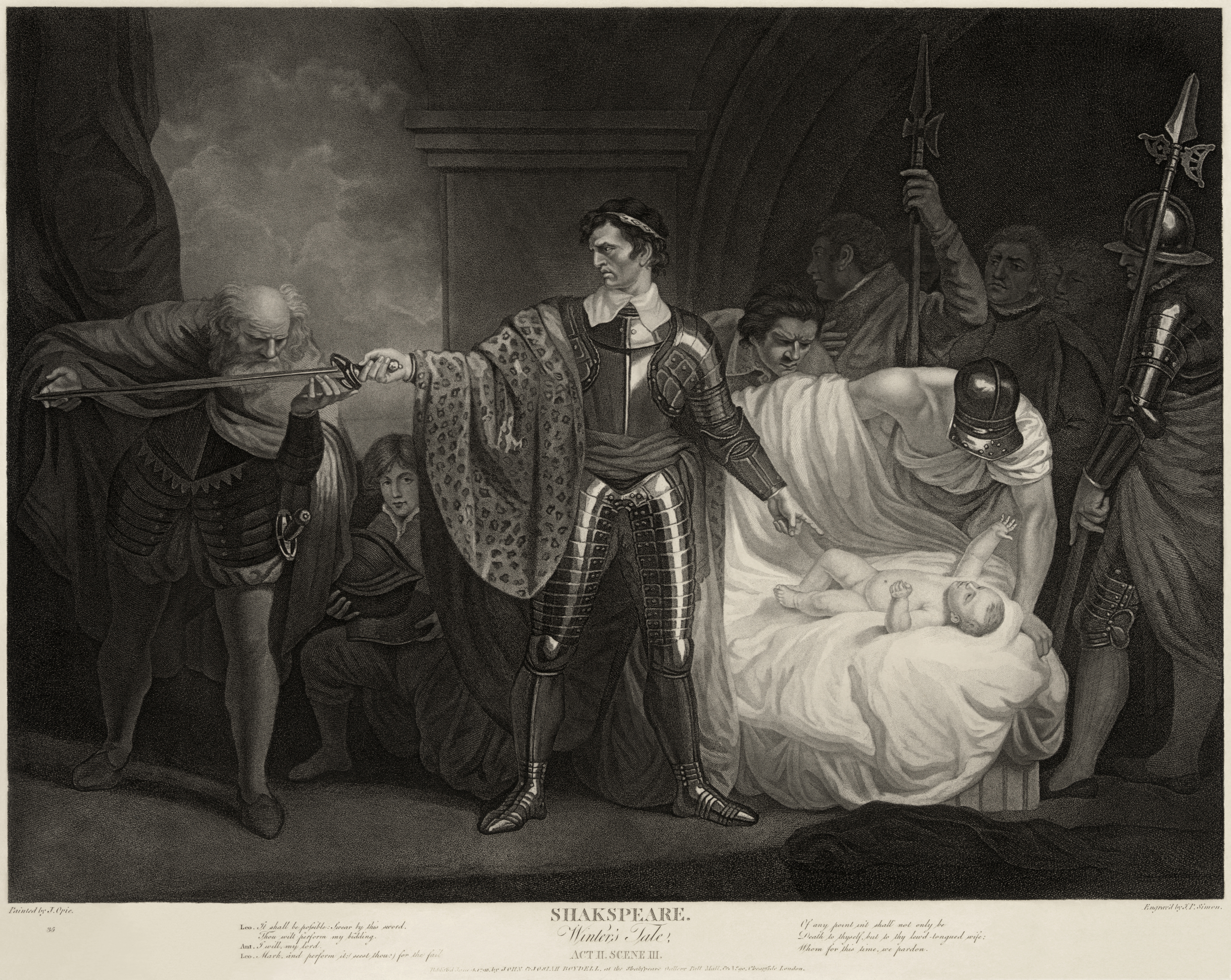
The Winter's Tale, Act II, scene III, (engraving after Opie for the Boydell Shakespeare Gallery)

Opie painted many notable men and women including Mary Wollstonecraft, Samuel Johnson, Francesco Bartolozzi, John Bannister, Joseph Munden, Charles James Fox, William Betty, Edmund Burke, John Crome, James Northcote, Henry Fuseli, Thomas Girtin, Robert Southey, Samuel Parr, Elizabeth Inchbald and Mary Shelley; 508 portraits in all, mostly in oil, and 252 other pictures. Opie painted the portrait of Captain Mark Oates whom he had seen paint a butterfly when both men were young. Opie painted the portrait of George Townshend, 1st Marquess Townshend who, in February 1792 became Lord Lieutenant of Norfolk - the county from which Opie's wife hailed. In 1799, Opie painted (oils) a portrait of Charlotte, Princess Royal, daughter of George III.

Jane Beetham Read was the only female student that Opie ever taught. He painted her portrait between 1790 and 1800, and asked for her hand in marriage around 1796, but her father rejected the marriage.

== Teaching and writing ==
In 1805, Opie was appointed a professor at the Royal Academy and from May 1806 gave a series of four lectures which were published as a book after his death, with a memoir by his widow Amelia Opie, in 1809. His students at the academy included Henry Thomson. Opie was also known as a writer on art by his Life of Reynolds in Wolcot's edition of Matthew Pilkington's Dictionary of Painters and his Letter on the Cultivation of the Fine Arts in England, in which he advocated the formation of a national gallery.

== Death ==
Opie died in April 1807, aged 45, at his home in Berners Street, and was buried at St Paul's Cathedral, in the crypt next to Joshua Reynolds, as he had wished. Royal etiquete allowed for Prince William Frederick, Duke of Gloucester to follow the Opie funeral procession in his carriages to St Paul's Cathedral. Opie's last portrait was of the Prince with whom Opie's wife, Amelia, shared a great interest in Abolitionism. Amongst the mourners at Opie's funeral were Sir Thomas Lawrence, J.M.W. Turner, Peter Finch Martineau and Henry Bone. Opie had no children.

== Gallery ==
John Opie's paintings

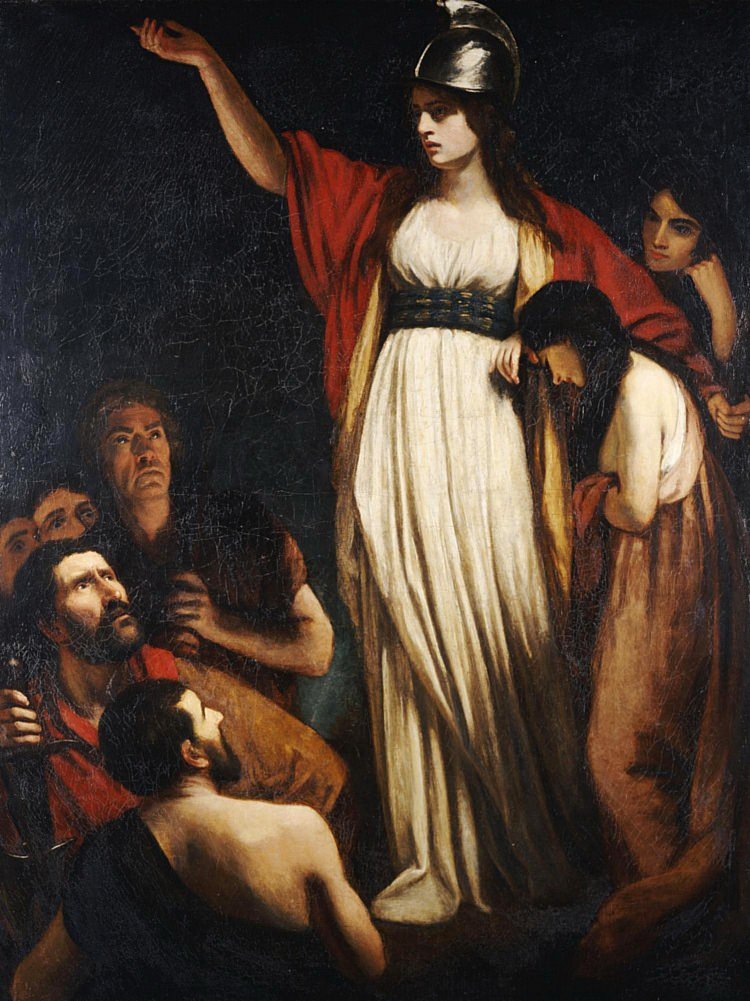
Boadicea Haranguing the Britons, 1793

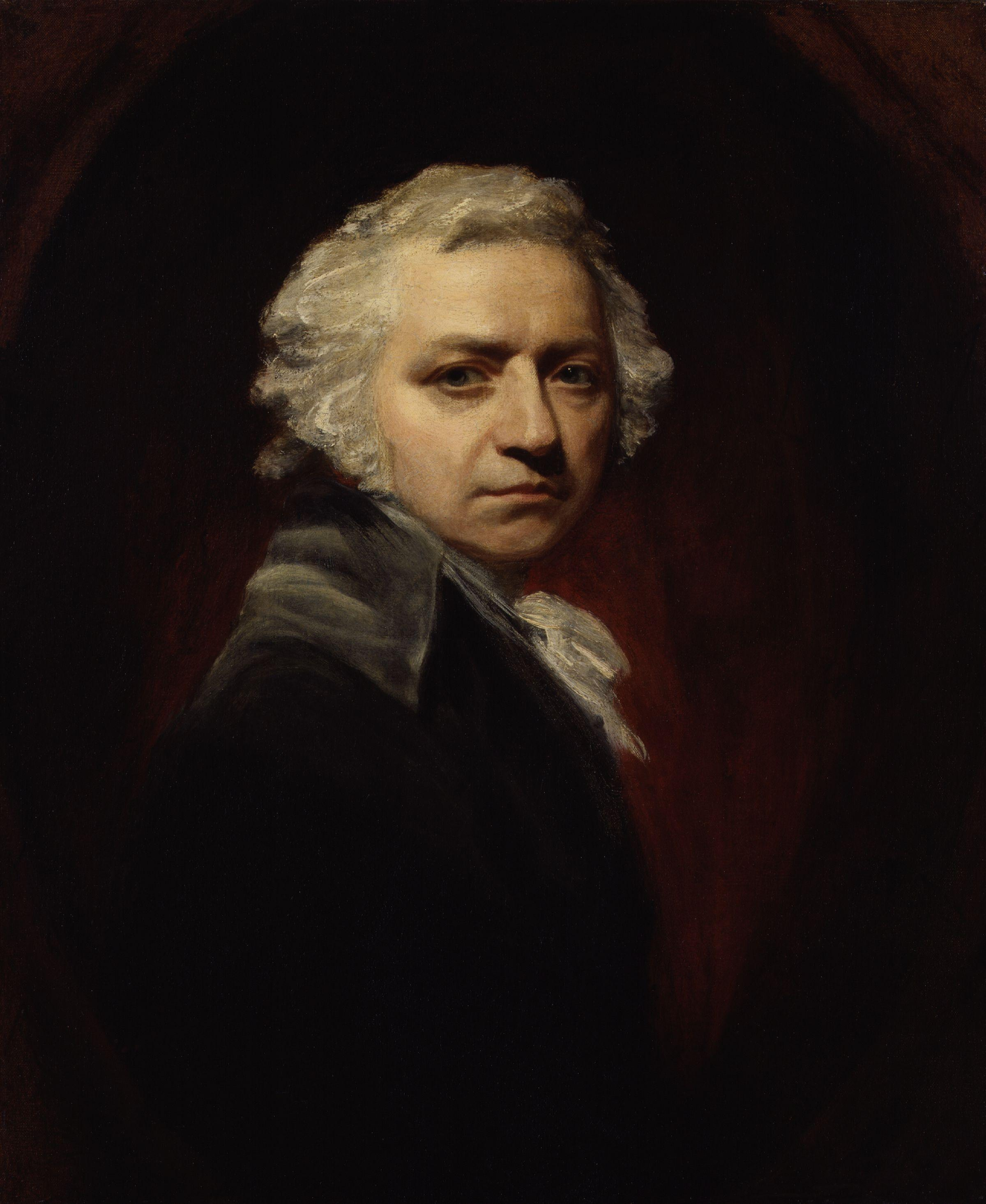
Henry Fuseli, 1794

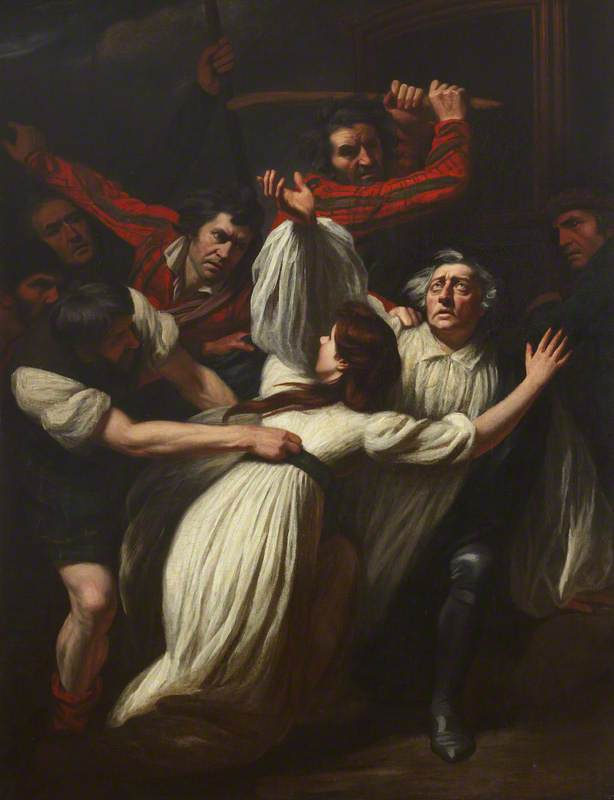
The Death of Archbishop Sharpe, 1797

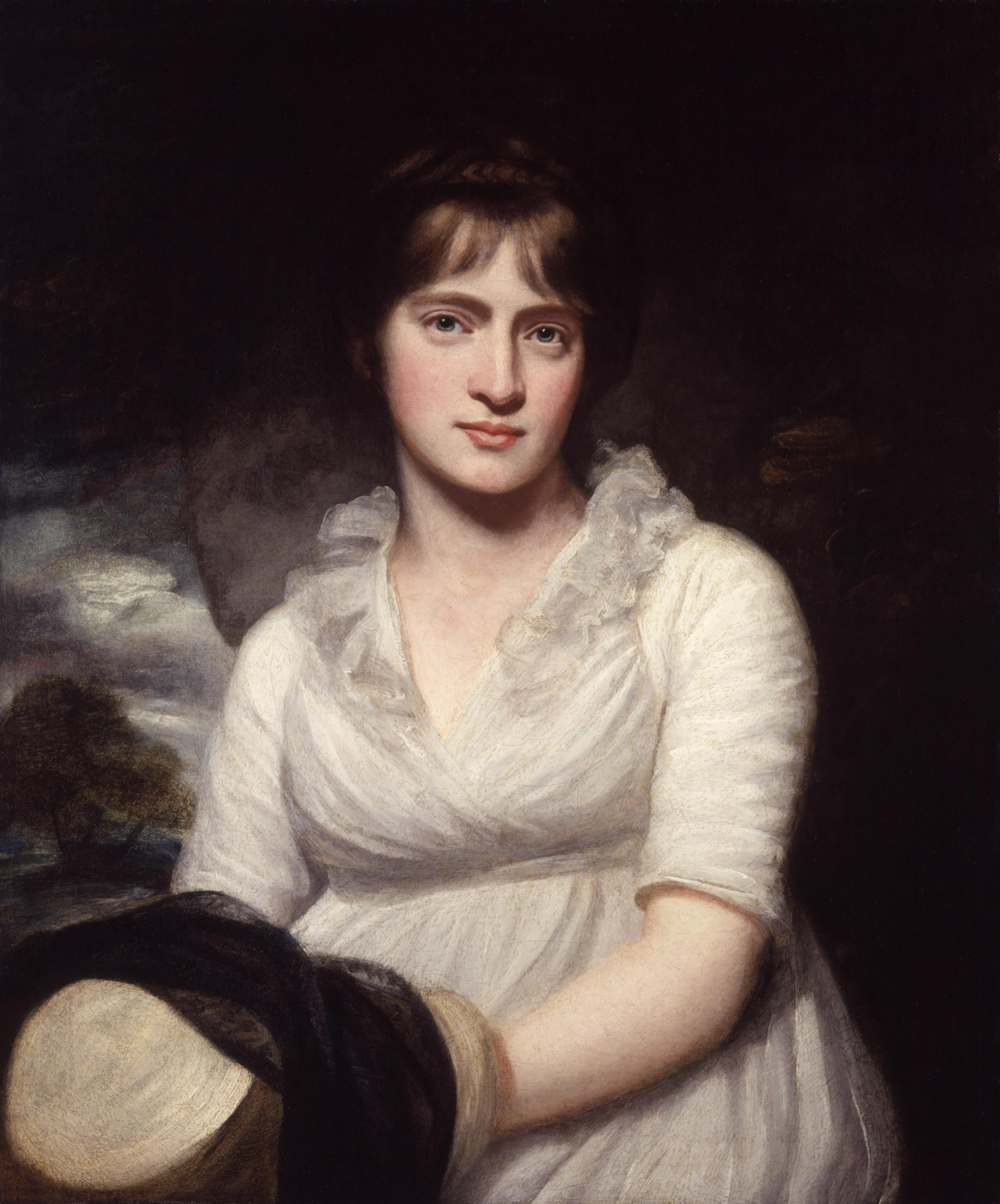
Portrait of Amelia Opie, 1798

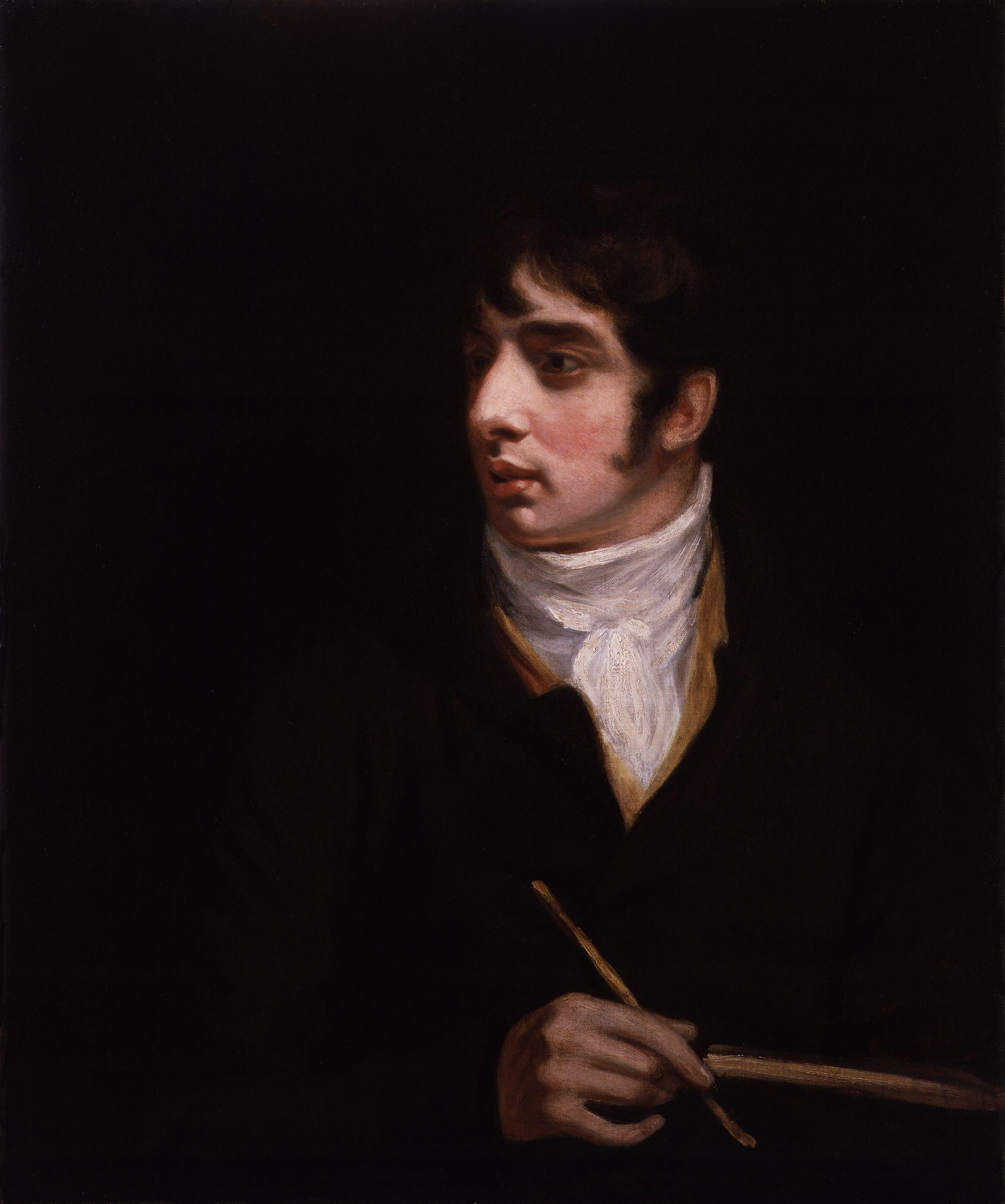
Portrait of Thomas Girtin, 1800

The Fugitive, 1800

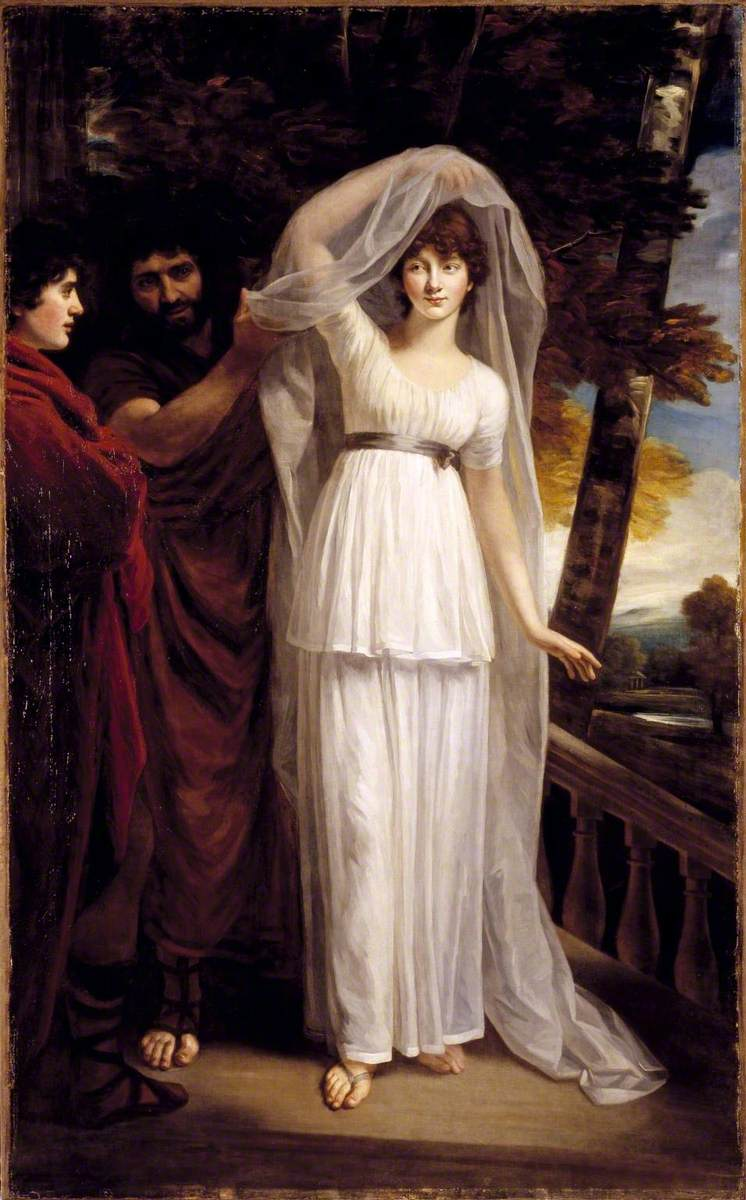
Portrait of a Lady in the Character of Cressida, 1800

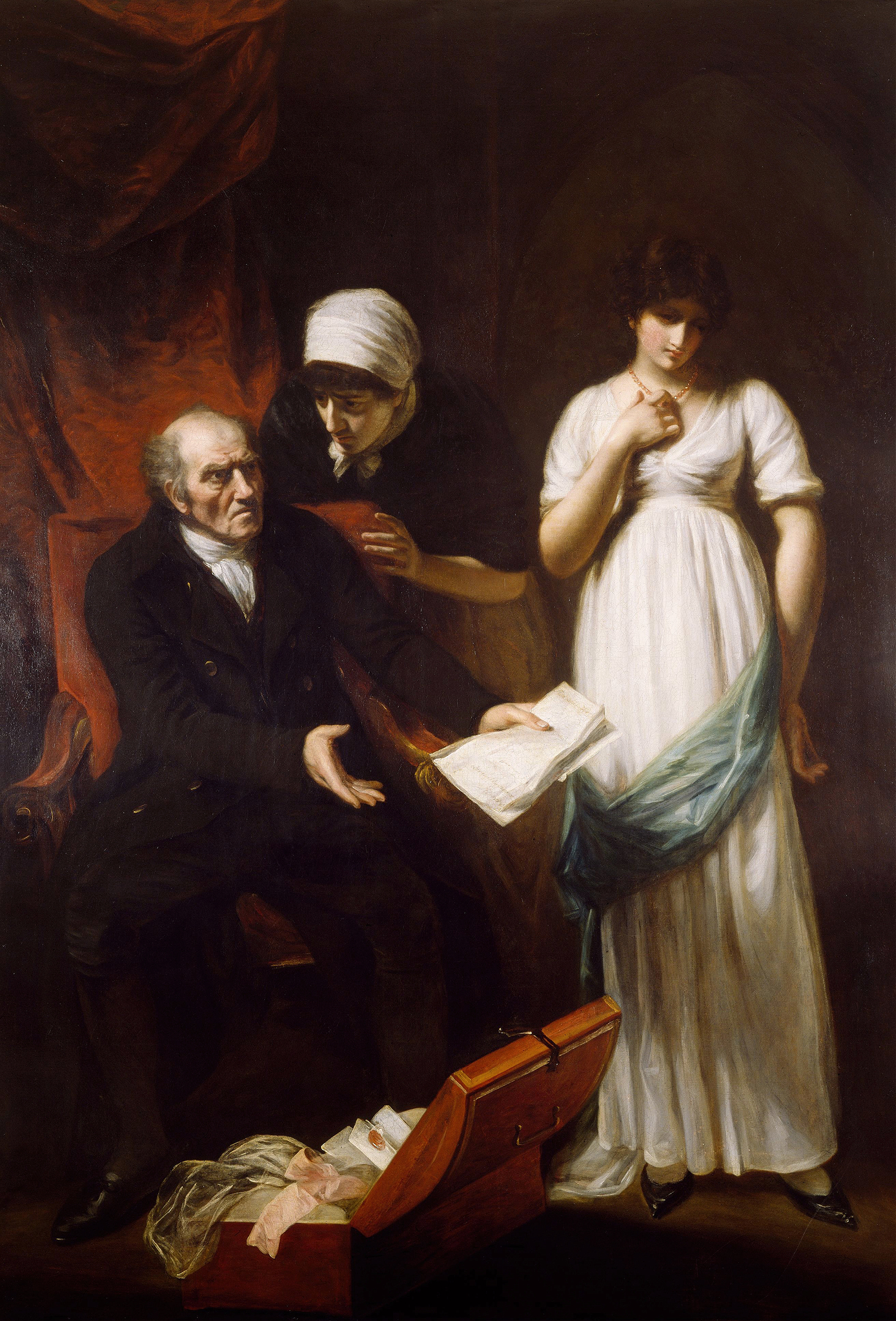
The Angry Father, 1802

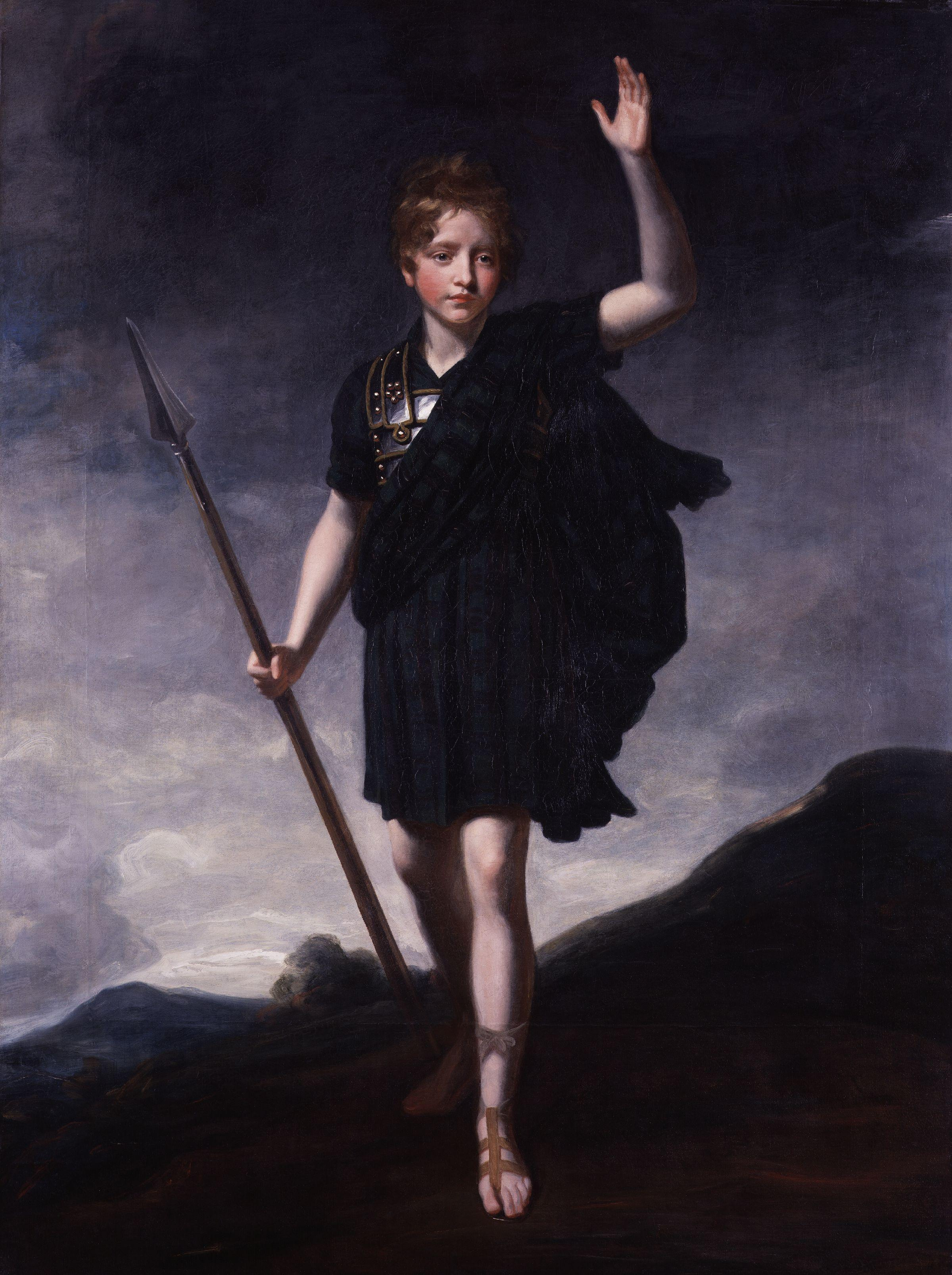
Master Betty as Young Norval, 1804

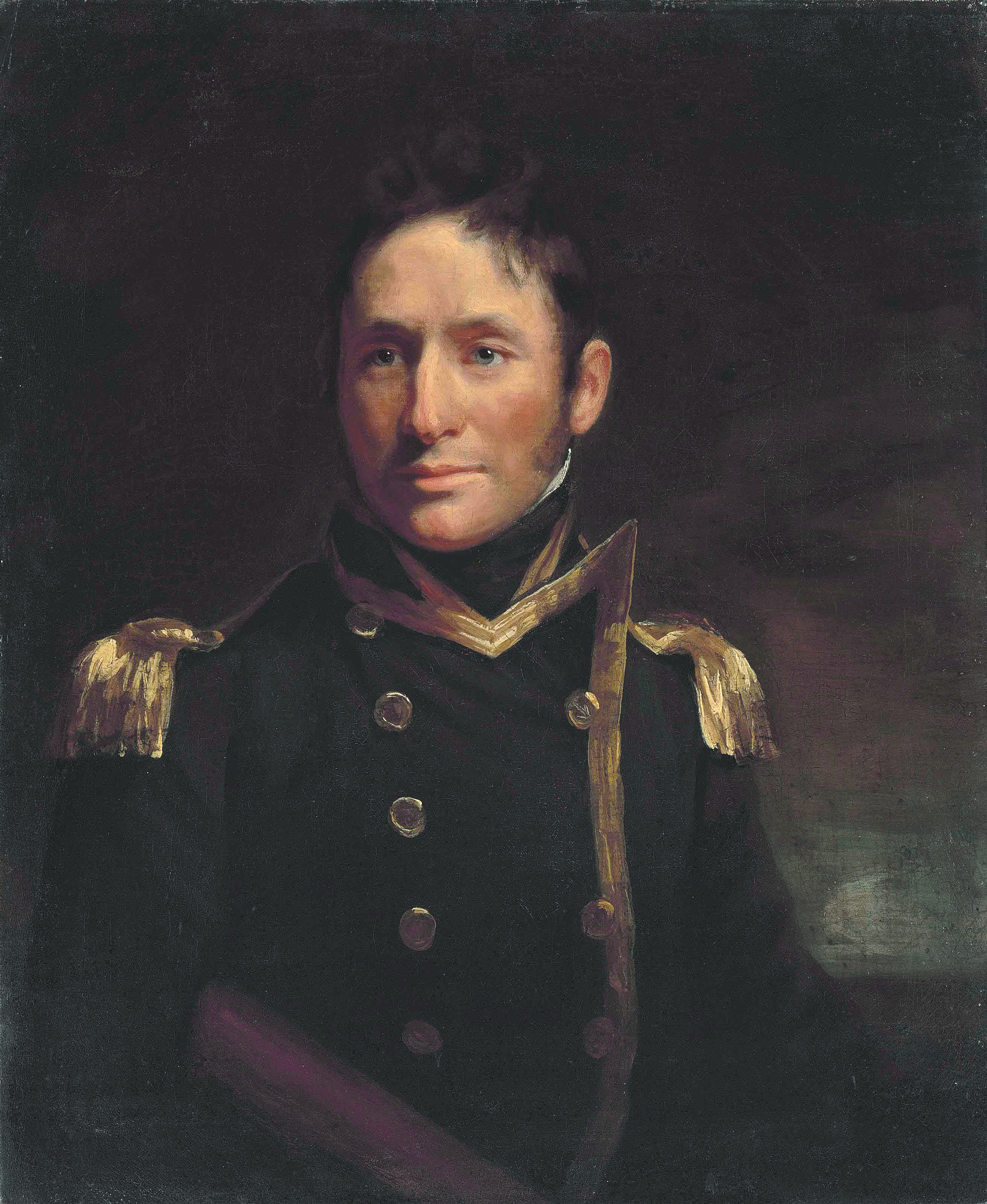
Philip Beaver, c.1805

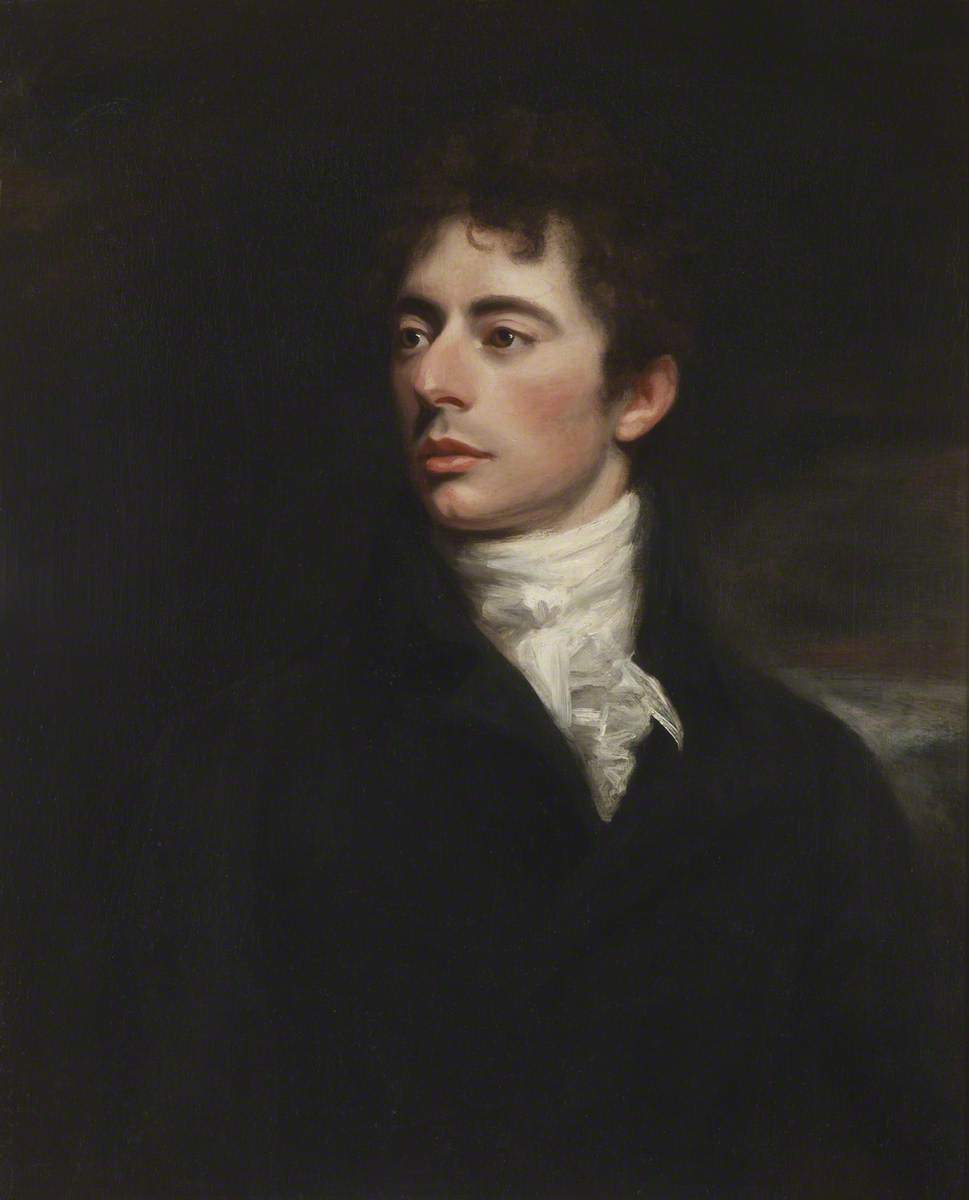
Portrait of Robert Southey, 1806
