= The Fugitive (painting) =

Painting by John Opie

- Artist: John Opie
- Year: 1800
- Type: Oil on canvas, genre painting
- Dimensions: 238.8 cm × 170.5 cm (94.0 in × 67.1 in)
- Location: Rhode Island School of Design Museum, Providence

The Fugitive is an 1800 oil painting by the British artist John Opie. It depicts a young woman about to elope with a man while her elderly chaperone is asleep at her spinning wheel. It is also known as La Fille mal gardée in reference to the popular 1789 comic ballet La fille mal gardée on which it was inspired.

Opie had been hailed as the "Cornish Wonder" following his arrival on the London scene in the 1780s and specialised in portraits, history paintings and works based on literature. The painting was displayed at the Royal Academy Exhibition of 1800 held at Somerset House in London and later in a retrospective exhibition at the British Institution in 1817. Today it forms part of the collection of the Rhode Island School of Design Museum which acquired it in 1983.

== Bibliography ==
- Earland, Ada. John Opie and His Circle. Hutchinson & Company, 1911.
- Slimmon, Ann H & Singsen, Judith A. (ed.) European Painting and Sculpture, Ca. 1770-1937, in the Museum of Art, Rhode Island School of Design. University of Pennsylvania Press, 1991.
