= Achille Leonardi =

Italian painter

Leonardi's signature

Achille Leonardi (ca. 1800–1870) was an Italian artist. He is known primarily for genre works painted in oil on canvas.

== Works ==
A representative sample of Leonardi's works includes:

- Linda di Chamonnid (Chamonix) (100 x 75 cm)
- A child's bed time (98 x 74 cm)
- Hurrying Home (46 x 38 cm)
- Guido Reni painting the Portrait of Beatrice Cenci in prison
- Madonna and Child (85 x 101.5 cm)
- Young Girl in Cloister - (99.1 x 71.1 cm)
- La Condamnée à Mort

A number of Leonardi's works were reproduced in different sizes. For example, 'Linda di Chamonnid' can also be seen at the Sheraton Towers Hotel in Buenos Aires, which is about 150% larger than the one listed above, which is now in a private collection in New Zealand. Similarly, there are at least two versions of Portrait of Beatrice and Hurrying Home in different sizes.

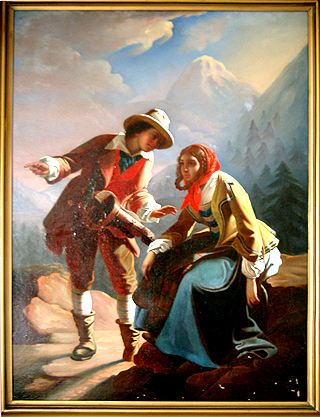
Linda di Chamonnid

Hurrying Home

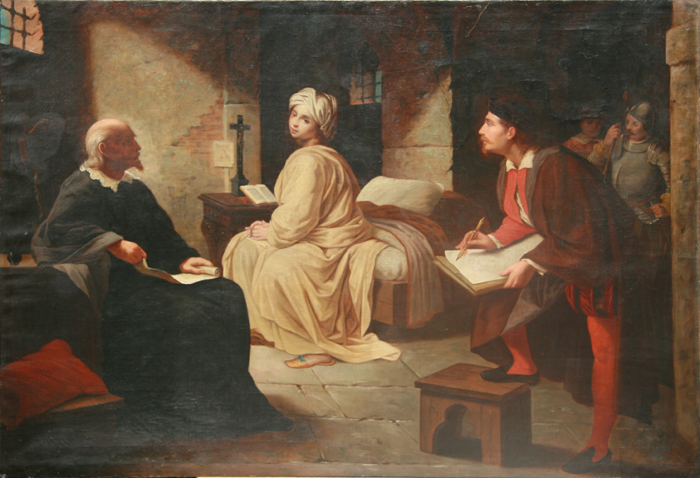
Guido Reni painting the Portrait of Beatrice Cenci in prison

== See also ==
- List of Italian painters
