= Auguste-Joseph Carrier =

French painter

Auguste-Joseph Carrier (January 14, 1797 in Paris – February 1875), a French painter. He was a pupil of Gros, Prud'hon, and Saint, and evinced much talent in the painting of miniatures, but in his later years he devoted himself almost entirely to landscapes. Carrier received the Légion d'Honneur in 1866.
