= Portrait of Thomas Girtin =

Painting by John Opie

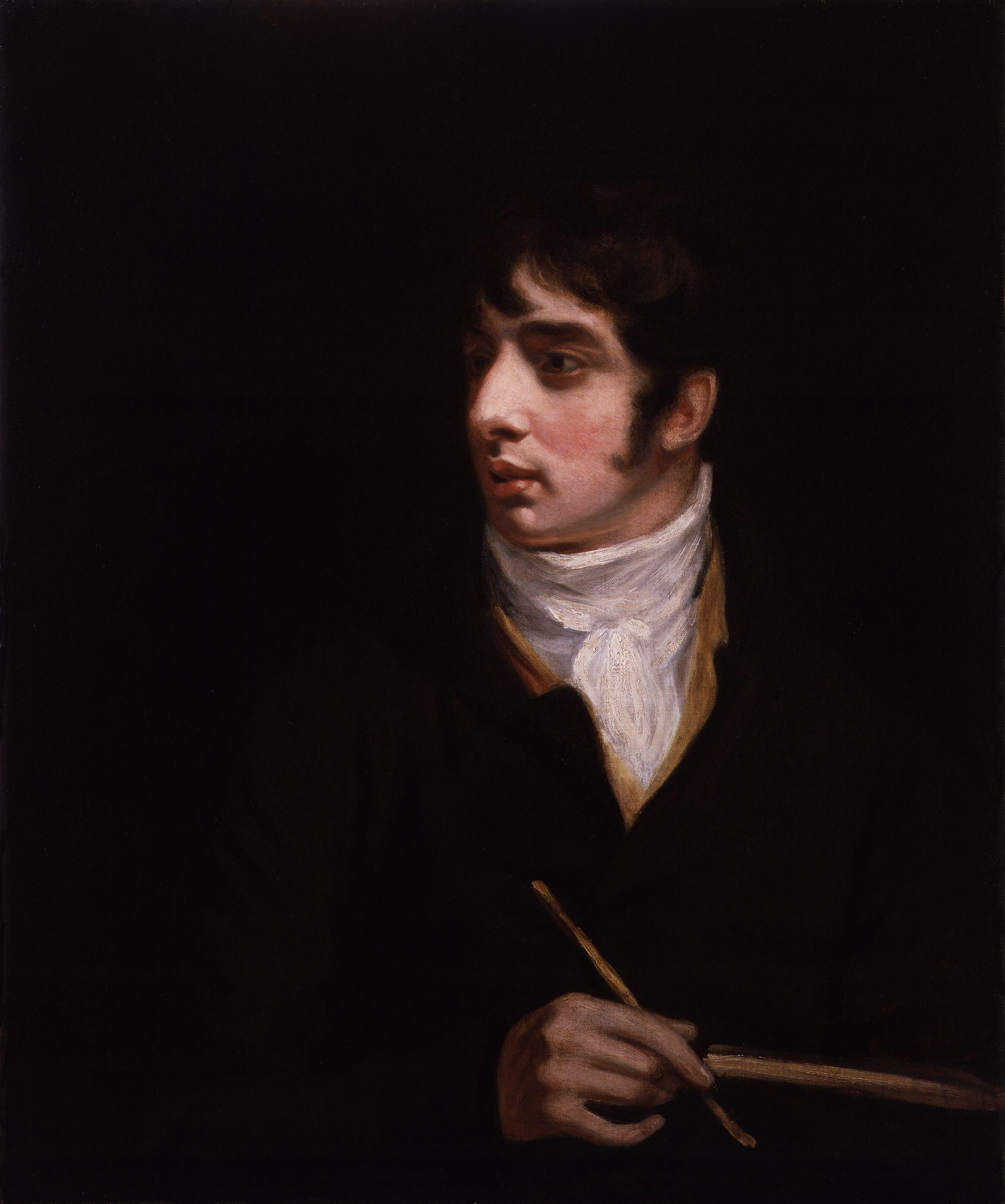
- Artist: John Opie
- Year: 1800
- Type: Oil on canvas, portrait painting
- Dimensions: 76.2 cm × 63.4 cm (30.0 in × 25.0 in)
- Location: National Portrait Gallery, London

Portrait of Thomas Girtin is an 1800 portrait painting by the British artist John Opie. It depicts his fellow painter Thomas Girtin, celebrated for his watercolours. Girtin was a friend and direct contemporary of J. M. W. Turner who achieved acclaim for his work, before his death at the age of twenty seven in 1802. Opie shows him as a heroic artist of the Romantic style emerging from darkness into light.

Opie was a prominent painter who had been hailed as the "Cornish Wonder" after his arrival on the art scene. He produced a number of number of portaits and history paintings. There are several versions of his pajnting, most notably one which is now in the collection of the National Portrait Gallery in London, having been acquired in 1891.

A mezzotint based on the painting was produced by the engraver Samuel William Reynolds in 1817.

== Bibliography ==
- Crane, David. Romantics & Revolutionaries: Regency Portraits from the National Portrait Gallery London. National Portrait Gallery, 2002.
- Smith, Greg. Thomas Girtin and the Art of Watercolor. Harry N. Abrams, 2002.
