= Portrait of a Lady in the Character of Cressida =

Painting by John Opie

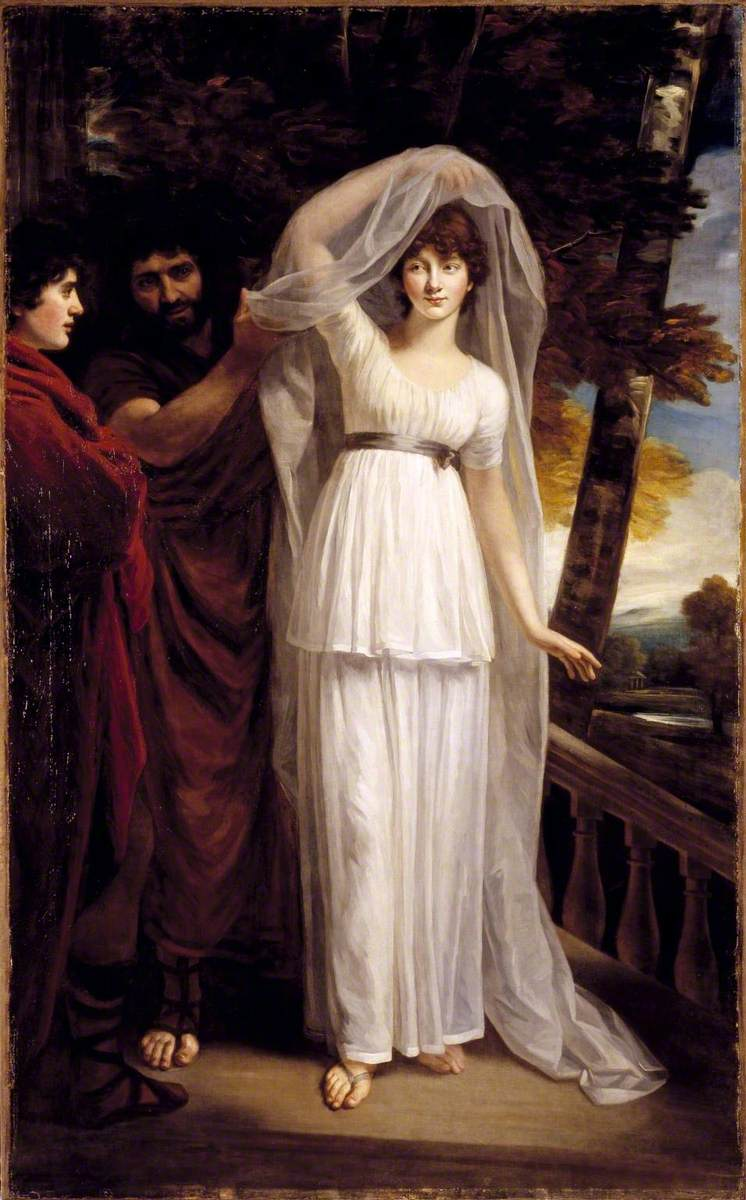
- Artist: John Opie
- Year: 1800
- Type: Oil on canvas, portrait painting
- Dimensions: 233.7 cm × 144.8 cm (92.0 in × 57.0 in)
- Location: Tate Britain, London

Portrait of a Lady in the Character of Cressida is an oil painting on canvas by the British artist John Opie, from, 1800. it is held at the Tate Britain, in London.

== History and description ==
It features a portrait of a young woman in the title role from William Shakespeare's tragedy Troilus and Cressida, that takes place during the Trojan War. It depicts the scene were Pandarus unveiling Cressida to Troilus. Cressida is dressed in an Ancient Greek inspired white dress and she looks charmingly to Troilus as she unveils. Her stance bears resemblance to Thomas Lawrence's 1798 picture John Philip Kemble as Coriolanus. A landscape can be seen in the background, at the right side.

Although the figure posing for Cressida was likely recognisable to those at the time, her identity is now unknown. It was an unusual choice as the play was rarely performed often in the later part of the eighteenth century. It has been suggested that the model resembled Jane Beetham Read, who Opie had once hoped to marry. The painting was displayed at the Royal Academy Exhibition of 1800 at Somerset House. It was donated to the National Gallery in 1834 by George Silk. Today it is in the collection of the Tate Britain.

== Bibliography ==
- Martineau, Jane. Shakespeare in Art. Dulwich Picture Gallery, 2003.
- Nachumi, Nora & Oppenheim, Stephanie. Jane Austen, Sex, and Romance: Engaging with Desire in the Novels and Beyond. University of Rochester Press, 2022.
- Sillars, Stuart. Shakespeare Seen: Image, Performance and Society. Cambridge University Press, 2019.
