= John Clayton (painter) =

English painter (1728–1800)

John Clayton (1728–1800) was an English painter.

== Life ==
Clayton belonged to a family living at Bush Hill, Edmonton. He was the brother of Samuel Clayton of Old Park, Enfield, and uncle of Nicholas Clayton. He was brought up to be a doctor, and served his time with the surgeon Samuel Sharp; but he did not manage to advance in the medical profession, and took up painting.

The form of art he adopted was still life, especially fruit and flower pieces, painting both in oil and water-colours; he occasionally painted landscapes. Clayton exhibited in 1761 and the following years at the Free Society of Artists in the Strand, London, However by 1767 he had become a member of the Incorporated Society of Artists, and was one of those who signed the society's roll declaration on its incorporation by charter in 1765. He continued to exhibit with them.

He lived in the Piazza, Covent Garden. In March 1769 a disastrous and extensive fire broke out which destroyed one side of the Piazza, and most of Clayton's best pictures were destroyed in the fire. After this he seems to have given up art, and retired, having married, to his brother's house at Enfield, where he devoted himself to gardening and music. He exhibited again in 1778. Clayton died on 23 June 1800 at Enfield, in his seventy-third year, leaving two sons and one daughter.
