= Banditti in a Landscape =

Painting by Philip James de Loutherbourg

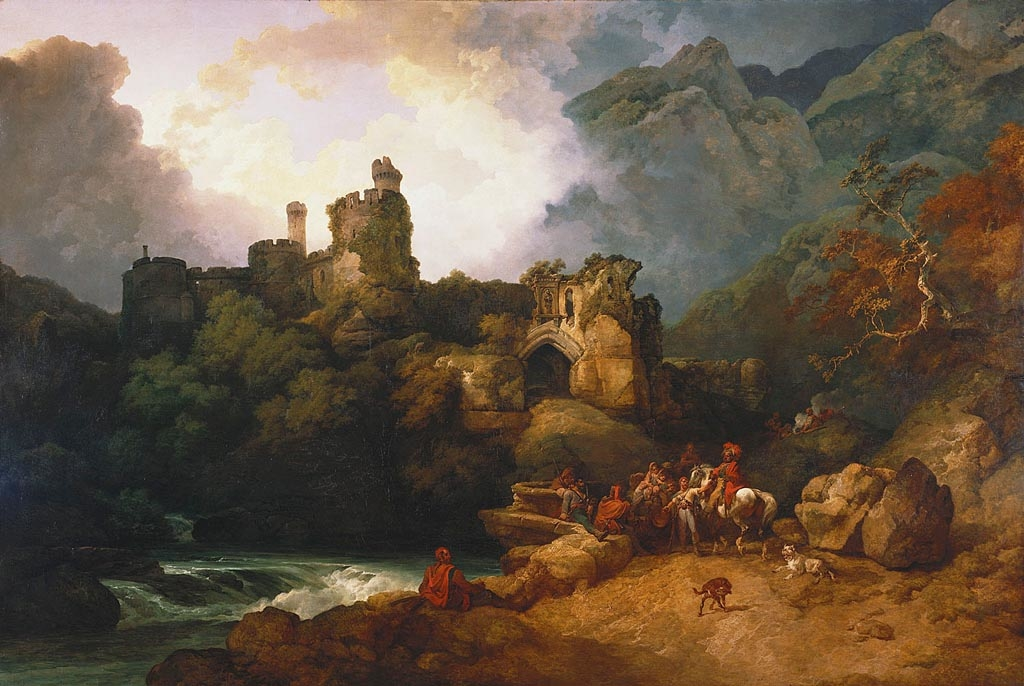
- Artist: Philip James de Loutherbourg
- Year: 1804
- Type: Oil on canvas, landscape painting
- Dimensions: 250.1 cm × 372.8 cm (98.5 in × 146.8 in)
- Location: Royal Collection, Windsor Castle

Banditti in a Landscape is an oil on canvas landscape painting by the French-born British artist Philip James de Loutherbourg, from 1804. It depicts a group of banditti against a stormy background with a ruined castle prominent in the distance. The outlaws are shown resting and drinking with their womenfolk and children. The work was commissioned by the Prince of Wales, the future George IV, for his London residence Carlton House. It later hung at Buckingham Palace where the belief that it represented Caernarfon Castle led to the room that housed it becoming known as the Caernarvon Room. Loutherbourg was paid a thousand guineas for the work, a very large sum for the era. It has been described as "Rococo-Sublime" It remains in the Royal Collection today, on display at Windsor Castle.

== Bibliography ==
- Blunt, Anthony. The Pictures in the Collection of Her Majesty the Queen: The later Italian pictures. Phaidon, 1969.
- Preston, Lillian Elvira. Philippe Jacques de Loutherbourg: Eighteenth Century Romantic Artist and Scene Designer. University of Florida, 1977.
- Roberts, Jane. George III and Queen Charlotte: Patronage, Collecting and Court Taste. Royal Collection, 2004.
- Wright, Christopher, Gordon, Catherine May & Smith, Mary Peskett. British and Irish Paintings in Public Collections: An Index of British and Irish Oil Paintings by Artists Born Before 1870 in Public and Institutional Collections in the United Kingdom and Ireland.
