= A Fishing Boat Brought Ashore near Conway Castle =

Painting by Philip James de Loutherbourg

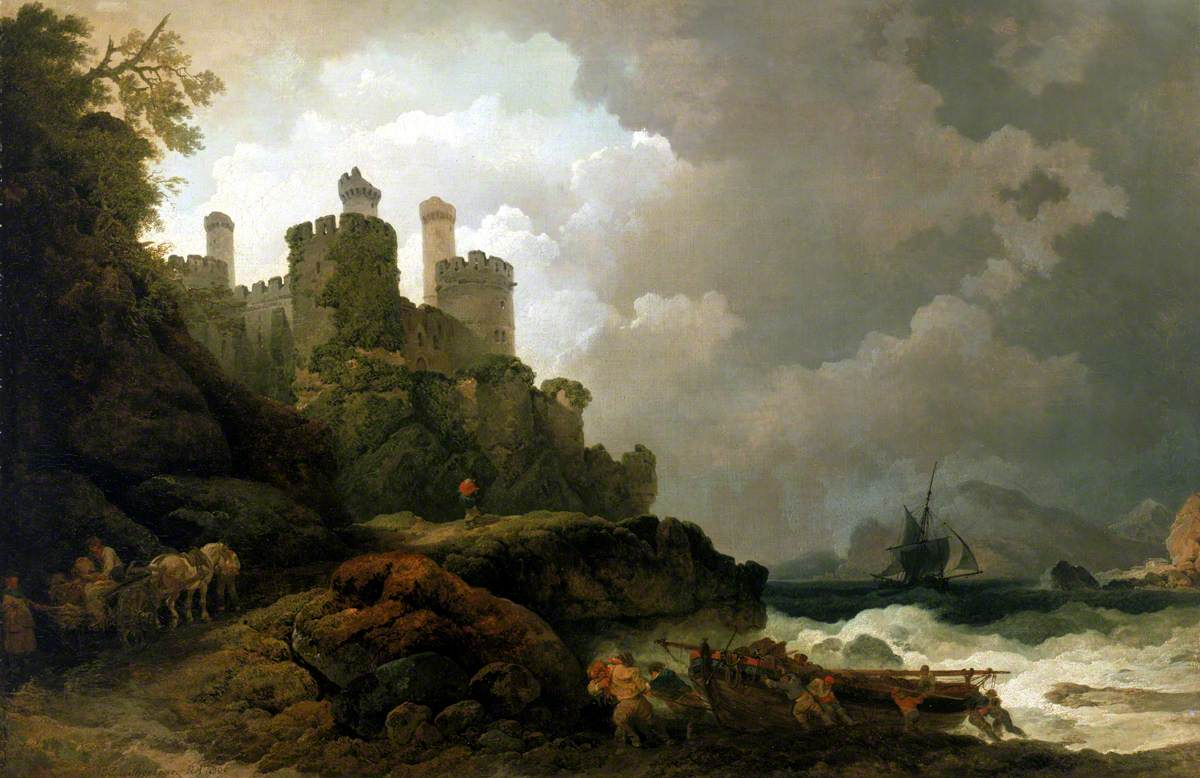
- Artist: Philip James de Loutherbourg
- Year: 1800
- Type: Oil on canvas, landscape painting
- Dimensions: 69.9 cm × 106.7 cm (27.5 in × 42.0 in)
- Location: National Maritime Museum; Greenwich

A Fishing Boat Brought Ashore near Conway Castle is an 1800 landscape painting by the French-born artist Philip James de Loutherbourg. it is a romantic view of Conwy Castle in North Wales, where a fishing vessel is being hauled ashore by its crew during a storm. Up the estuary of the River Conwy, a cutter can be seen. The castle itself, built by Edward I during the Conquest of Wales, is shown on the hill as a romantic ruin. It has been suggested that the scene may depict smuggling taking place. The work was likely displayed at the Royal Academy's Summer Exhibition of 1801 at Somerset House in London. Today the painting is in the National Maritime Museum in Greenwich

== Bibliography ==
- Hermann, Luke. British Landscape Painting of the Eighteenth Century. Oxford University Press, 1974.
- Preston, Lillian Elvira. Philippe Jacques de Loutherbourg: Eighteenth Century Romantic Artist and Scene Designer. University of Florida, 1977.
- Wright, Christopher, Gordon, Catherine May & Smith, Mary Peskett. British and Irish Paintings in Public Collections: An Index of British and Irish Oil Paintings by Artists Born Before 1870 in Public and Institutional Collections in the United Kingdom and Ireland. Yale University Press, 2006.
