= The Destruction of Pharaoh's Army =

Painting by Philip James de Loutherbourg

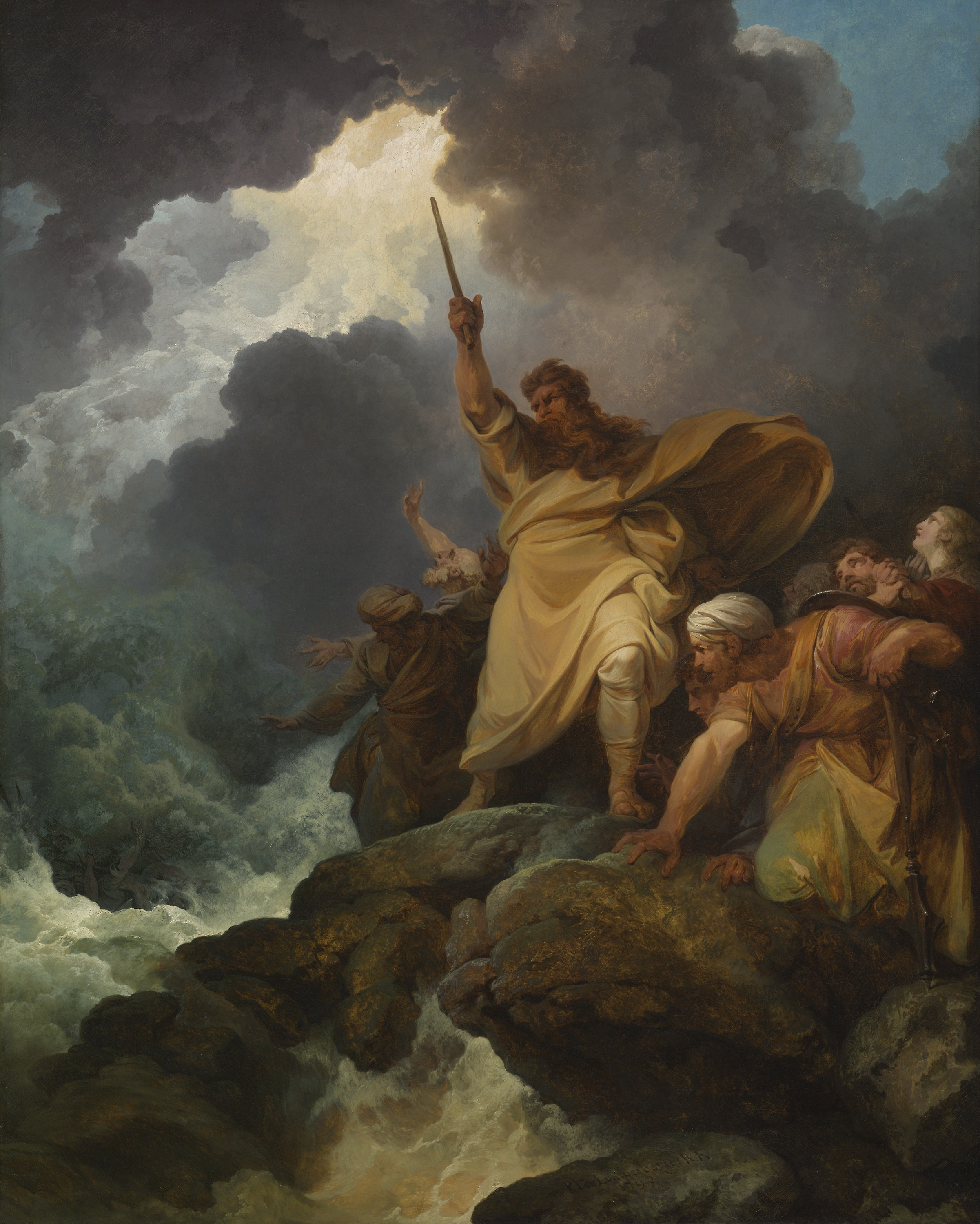
- Artist: Philip James de Loutherbourg
- Year: 1792
- Type: Oil on canvas, history painting
- Dimensions: 127 cm × 102.3 cm (50 in × 40.3 in)
- Location: Art Institute of Chicago; Illinois

The Destruction of Pharaoh's Army is a 1792 religious history painting by the French-born British artist Philip James de Loutherbourg. It depicts the Old Testament scene from The Exodus. Following the Parting of the Red Sea to allow the Israelites to escape, Moses drops his staff leading to the drowning of the pursuing Egyptian army of Pharaoh. Loutherbourg was known for his use of romantic imagery in his works, frequently featuring storms. The painting was commissioned by Thomas Macklin to appear at his Poet's Gallery at Pall Mall. Today it is in the collection of the Art Institute of Chicago, having been acquired in 1991.

== Bibliography ==
- Joppien, Rüdiger . Philippe Jacques de Loutherbourg, RA, 1740-1812. Greater London Council, 1973.
- Schaefer, Sarah C. Gustave Doré and the Modern Biblical Imagination. Oxford University Press, 2021.
