= Philip James de Loutherbourg =

French-born British painter

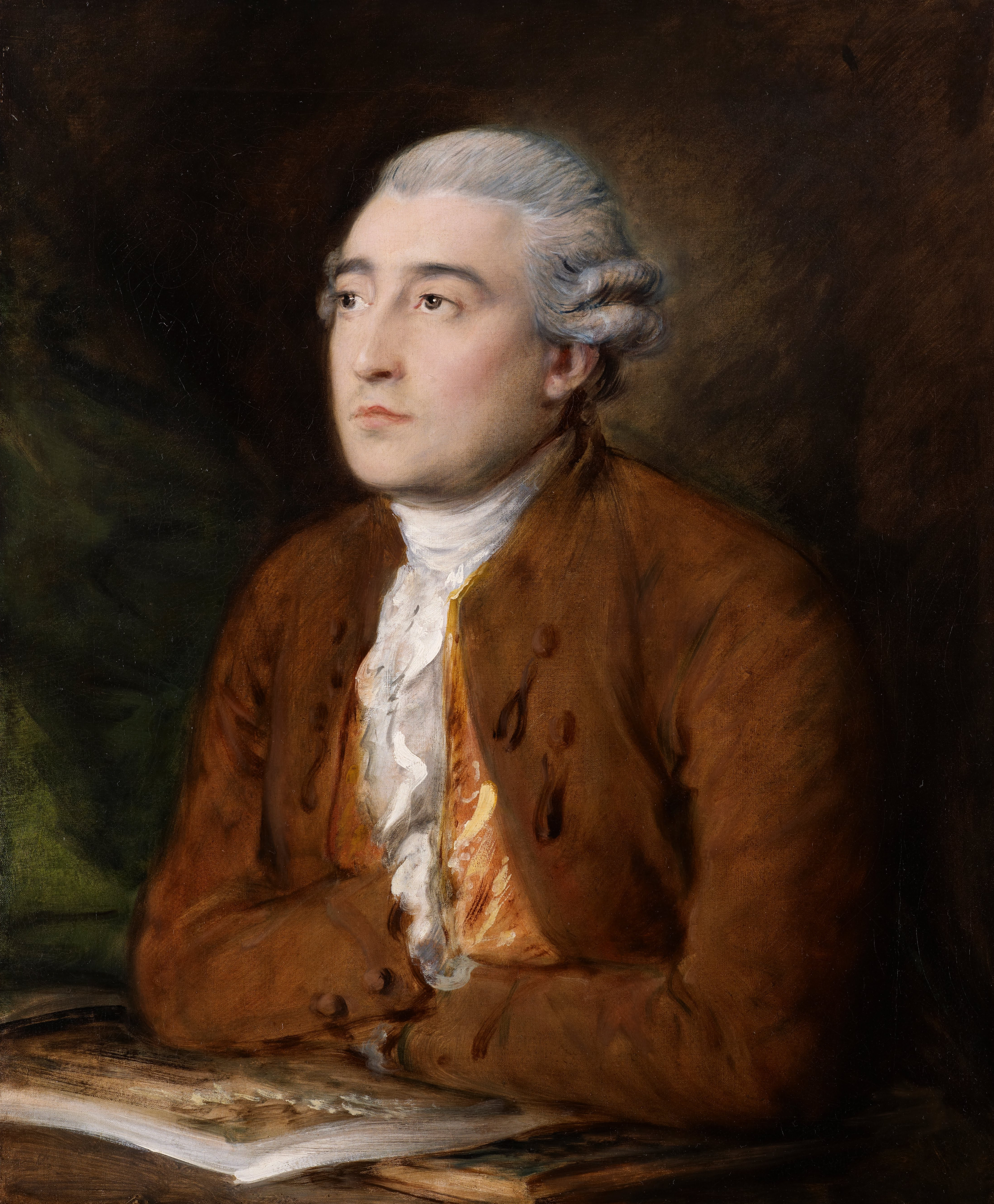
- Portrait of Philip James de Loutherbourg by Thomas Gainsborough, 1778
- Born: Philippe Jacques de Loutherbourg; 31 October 1740; Strasbourg, Alsace, France
- Died: 11 March 1812 (aged 71); Chiswick, Middlesex, Britain
- Education: Charles-André van Loo; Francesco Giuseppe Casanova
- Known for: Painting
- Notable work: Lord Howe's action, or the Glorious First of June; Coalbrookdale by Night
- Movement: History painting Military art Romanticism

Philip James de Loutherbourg, RA (born Philippe Jacques de Loutherbourg; 31 October 1740 – 11 March 1812) was a French-born British painter who became known for his large naval works, his elaborate set designs for London theatres, and his invention of a mechanical theatre called the "Eidophusikon". He also had an interest in faith-healing and the occult, and was a companion of the confidence-trickster Alessandro Cagliostro.

== Early life ==
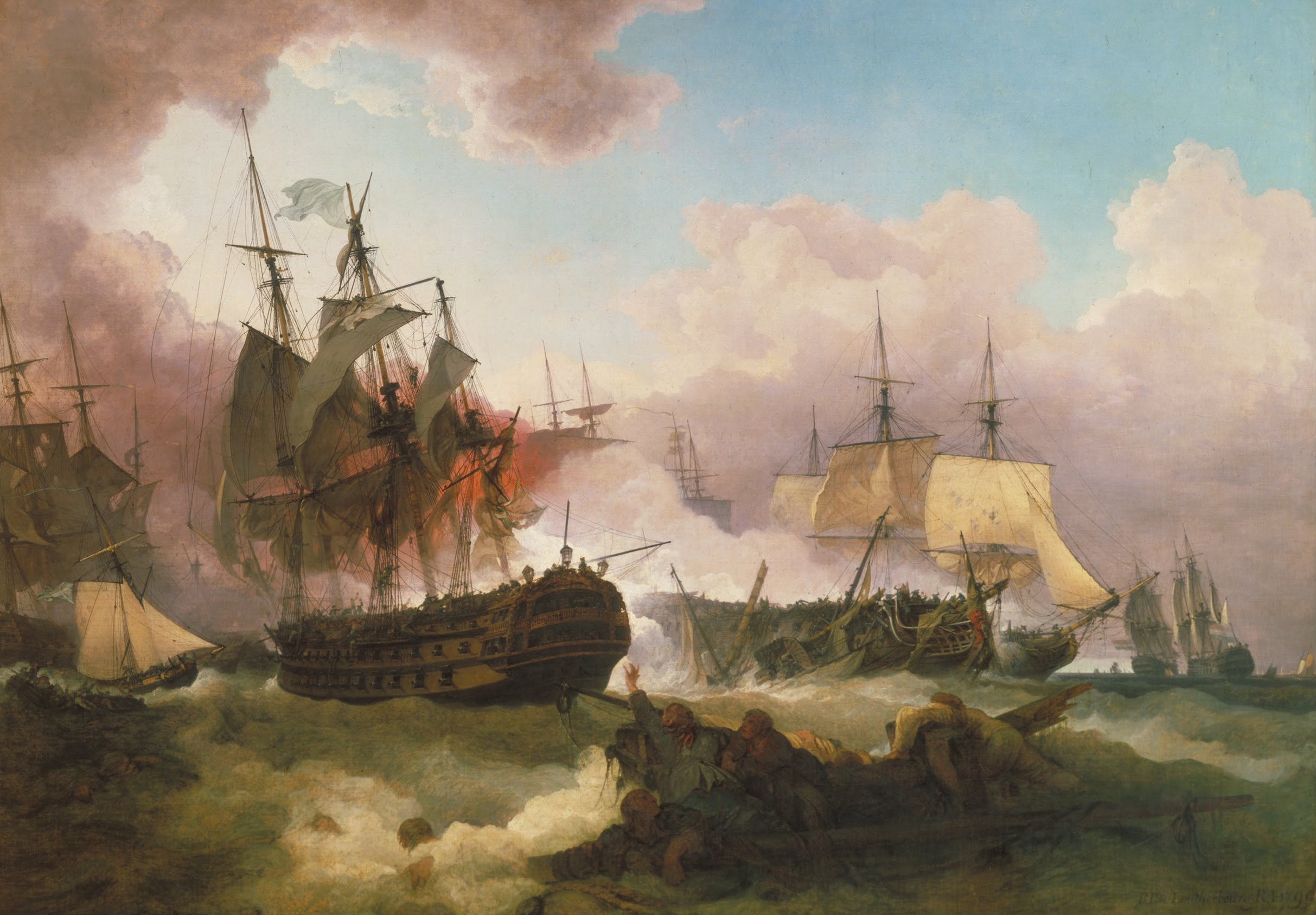
The Battle of Camperdown (1799)

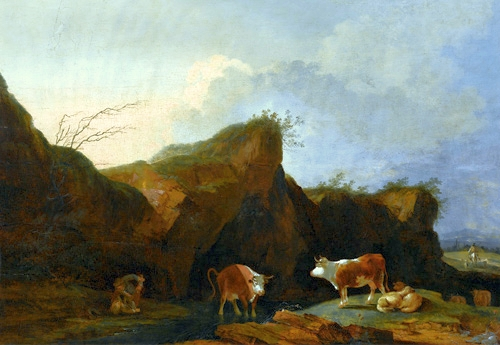
Landscape with cows, Wilanów Palace, Warsaw

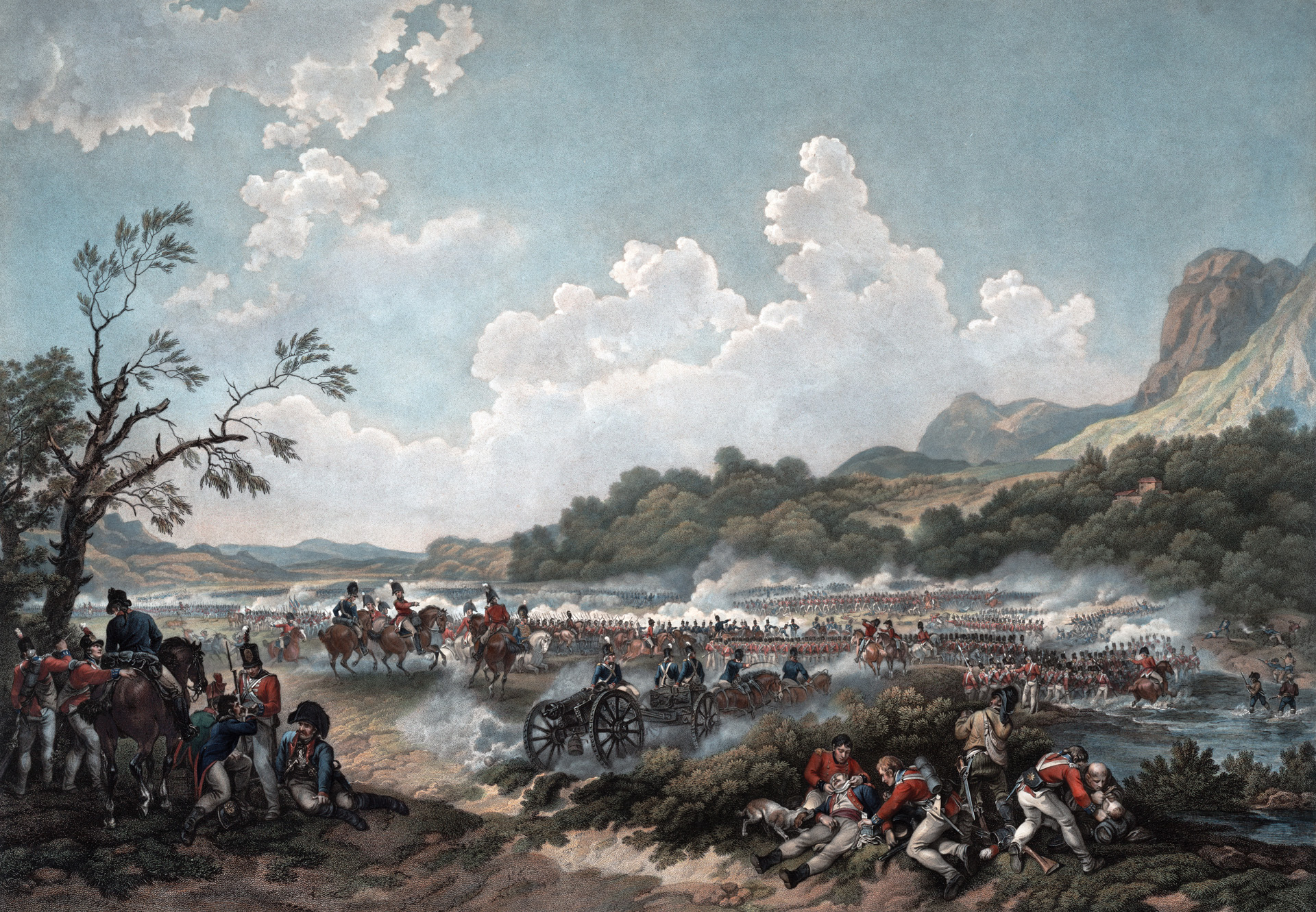
Battle of Maida. Engraving based on Loutherbourg's painting.

Loutherbourg was born in Strasbourg in 1740, the son of a Swiss miniature painter. Intended for the Lutheran ministry, he was educated at the University of Strasbourg.

=== Paris ===
Rejecting a religious calling, Loutherbourg decided to become a painter, and in 1755 placed himself under Charles-André van Loo in Paris, and later under Francesco Giuseppe Casanova. His talent developed rapidly, and he became a figure in the fashionable society of the day. He first exhibited at the Salon of 1763 where his Landscape with Figures and Animals attracted praise from Denis Diderot. He followed this up with further success at the Salon of 1765 with two paintings including Morning After the Rain. In 1767 he was elected to the French Academy, although below the age required by the rules of the institution, and painted landscapes, sea storms, and battles, all of which work had a celebrity above those of the specialists then working in Paris. He made his debut with the exhibition of twelve pictures, including Storm at Sunset, Night, and Morning after Rain.

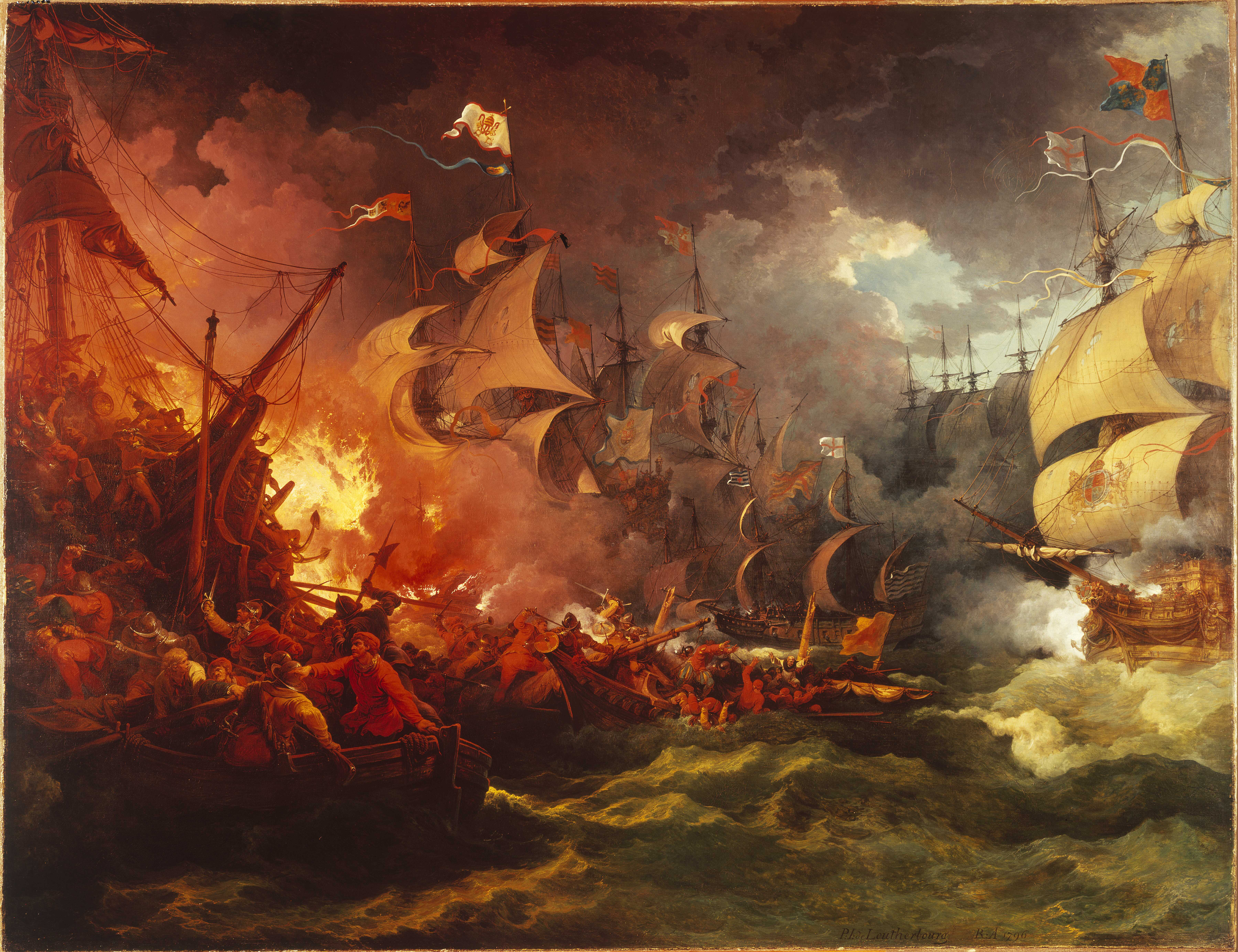
Defeat of the Spanish Armada, 1796. One of Loutherbourg's large battle scenes depicting the English victory against the Spanish Armada in 1588. Today it is in the National Maritime Museum in Greenwich.

=== Travels ===
Loutherbourg then travelled through Switzerland, Germany and Italy, distinguishing himself as much by his mechanical inventions as by his painting. One of these, showing new effects produced in a model theatre, was the wonder of the day, with its use of lights behind canvas representing the moon and stars, and the illusory appearance of running water produced by clear blue sheets of metal and gauze, with loose threads of silver.

== London ==
=== Theatre ===
In 1771 he settled in London, where David Garrick paid him £500 a year to design scenery and costumes and oversee the stage machinery at the Drury Lane Theatre. His stage effects attracted the admiration not just of the general public, but also of artists, including Joshua Reynolds. He devised scenic effects in which, for instance, green trees gradually became russet and the moon rose and lit the edges of passing clouds: illusions achieved through the use of coloured lantern-slides and the ingenious lighting of transparencies. He continued to work at the theatre until 1785.

He achieved an even greater success with an entertainment called the Eidophusikon, meaning "image of nature". This was a miniature mechanical theatre measuring six by eight feet, and described as displaying "Various Imitations of Natural Phenomena, represented by Moving Pictures". It was presented at Loutherbourg's home from March 1781 in an auditorium seating about 130 people. He used Argand lamps to light the stage and stained glass to change colours.

At Christmas, 1781, Loutherbourg mounted a spectacle at a party in the Egyptian Hall at Fonthill for William Beckford, promising (according to Beckford) to "present a mysterious something that the eye has not seen or heart of man conceived". Following this he attempted rather more fantastical subjects for the Eidophusikon, presenting a scene from Paradise Lost with "Satan arraying his troops on the banks of the Fiery Lake, and the rising of the Palace of Pandemonium". The Eidophusikon soon closed, however, as the income did not cover the costs and the audience demanded new productions faster than Loutherbourg could create them. He has been called the inventor of the panorama but, although it first appeared about the same time as the Eidophusikon, the first panorama was painted and exhibited by the Scottish painter Robert Barker.

=== Painting ===
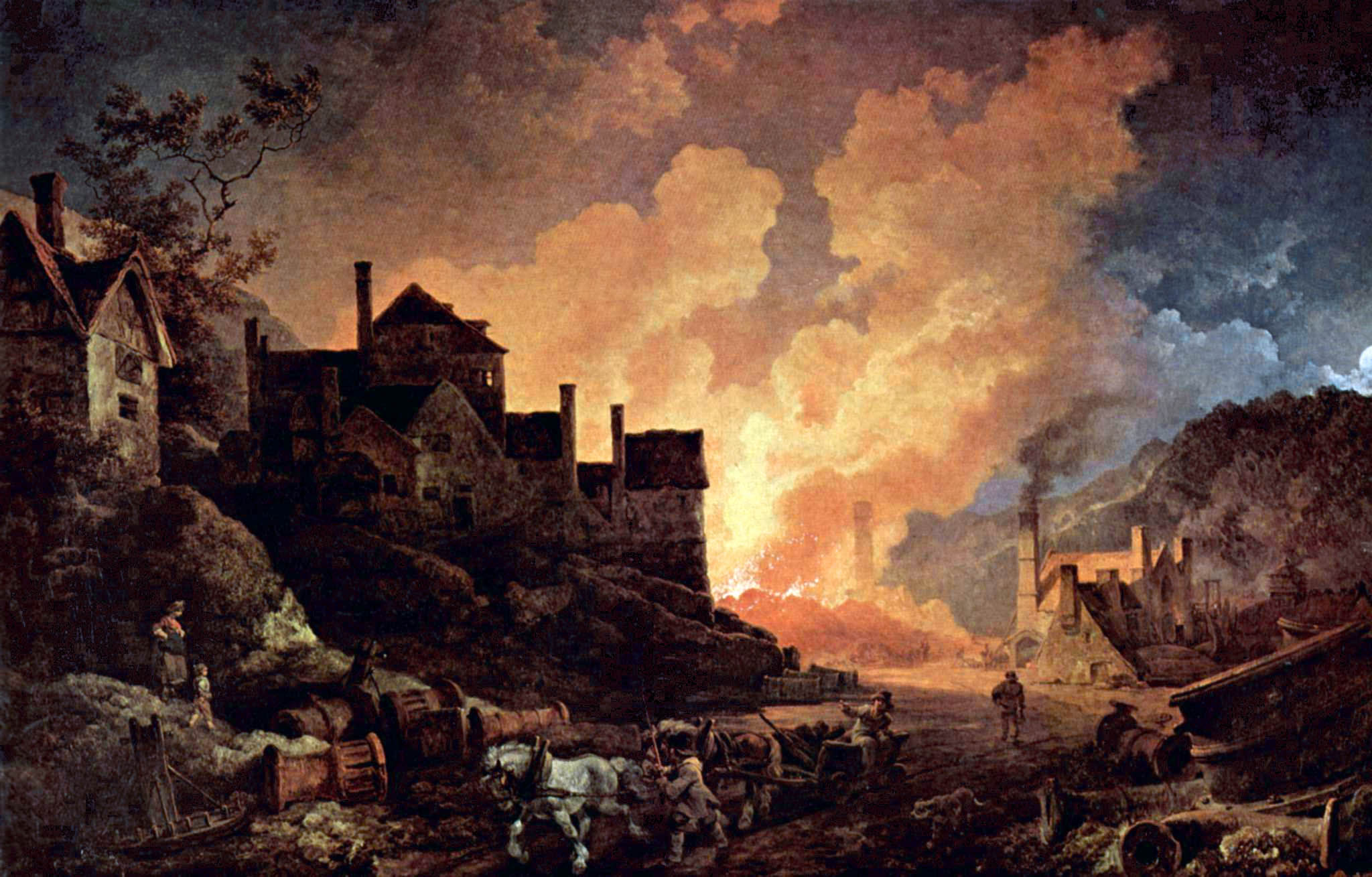
Coalbrookdale by Night (1801)

Despite these other projects, Loutherbourg still found time for painting. Lord Howe's action, or the Glorious First of June (exhibited 1795) and other large naval pictures were commissioned to commemorate British naval victories, many of them ending up soon afterwards in the Greenwich Hospital Gallery (in whose successor, the National Maritime Museum, they still remain). His finest work was the Defeat of the Spanish Armada. He also painted The Great Fire of London and several historical works, including The Grand Attack on Valenciennes (1793). He was interested in the Industrial Revolution, and his 1801 painting Coalbrookdale by Night shows iron foundries at work.

Seven of his paintings, including Lodore Waterfall and Skating in Hyde Park, are in the Government Art Collection.

He was made a member of the Royal Academy in 1781.

== Publications ==
Two sets of drawings by de Loutherbourg were published, reproduced in aquatint, under the title Picturesque English Scenery in 1801 and 1805. He also contributed illustrations to a Bible published by Thomas Macklin in 1800. After his death Cadell and Davies published a volume of the Apocrypha. All 110 of his drawings for the vignettes (but not the Apocrypha) are pasted in the Bowyer Bible in Bolton Museum in Greater Manchester.

== Esoteric interests ==
In 1789 Loutherbourg temporarily gave up painting, in order to pursue an interest in alchemy and the supernatural. He met Alessandro Cagliostro, who instructed him in the occult. He travelled about with Cagliostro, leaving him, however, before his condemnation to death. He and his wife also took up faith-healing. A pamphlet called A List of a Few Cures performed by Mr and Mrs De Loutherbourg, of Hammersmith Terrace, without Medicine was published in 1789. Written by a follower named Mary Pratt, it claimed that the Loutherbourgs had cured two thousand people between Christmas 1788 and the following July, "having been made proper recipients to receive divine manuductions".

== Death ==
Loutherbourg died in Chiswick in west London in 1812.

There are paintings by him in the collections of many British institutions including Tate Britain, the Victoria and Albert Museum, the National Portrait Gallery, the Royal Academy of Art, Leicester, Farnham and Derby Art Gallery.

Loutherbourg was buried in Chiswick Old Cemetery, adjoining the graveyard of St Nicholas Church, Chiswick. Buried nearby are the artists William Hogarth and James Abbott McNeill Whistler.

== Gallery ==
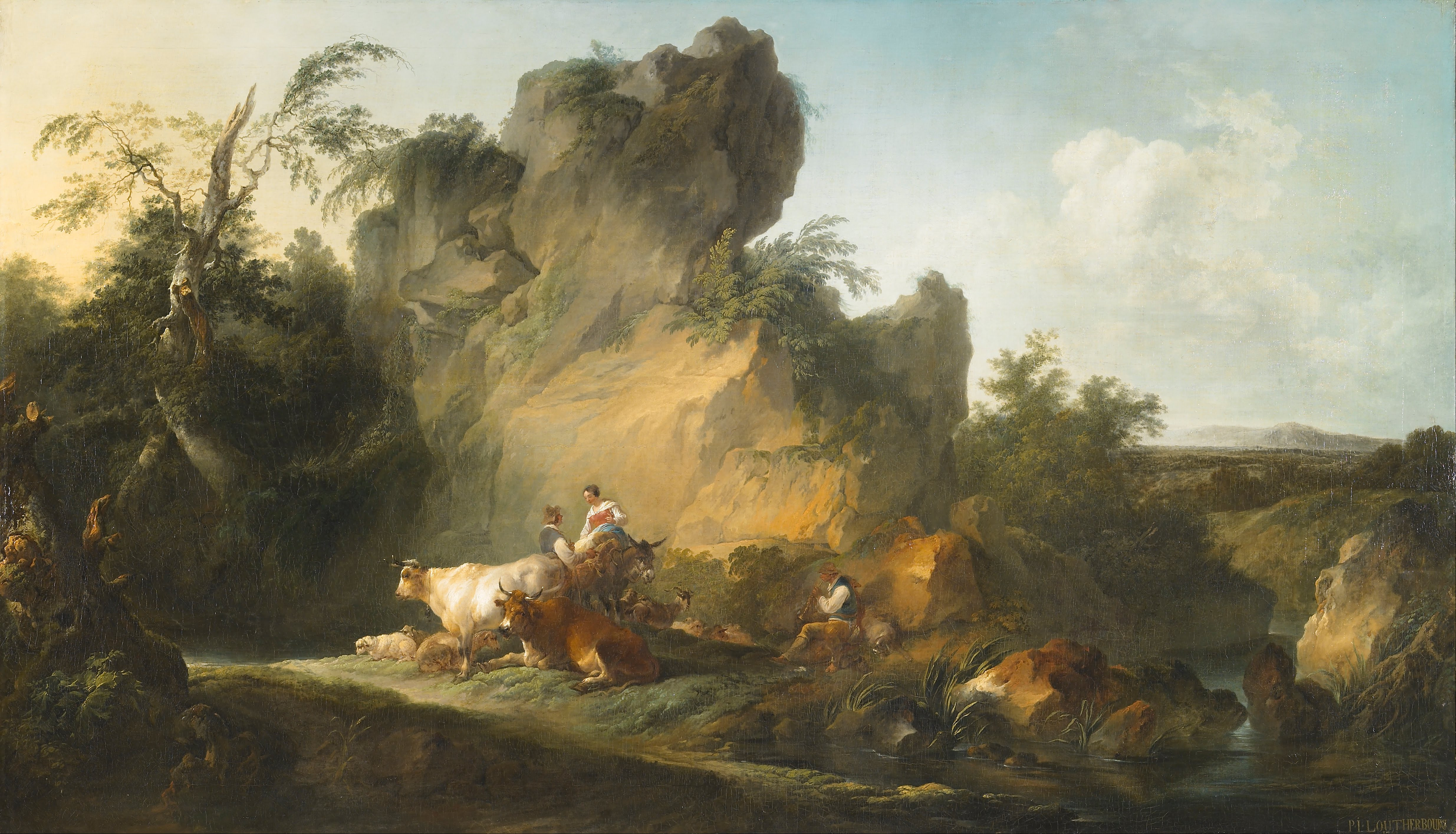
Landscape with Figures and Animals, 1763

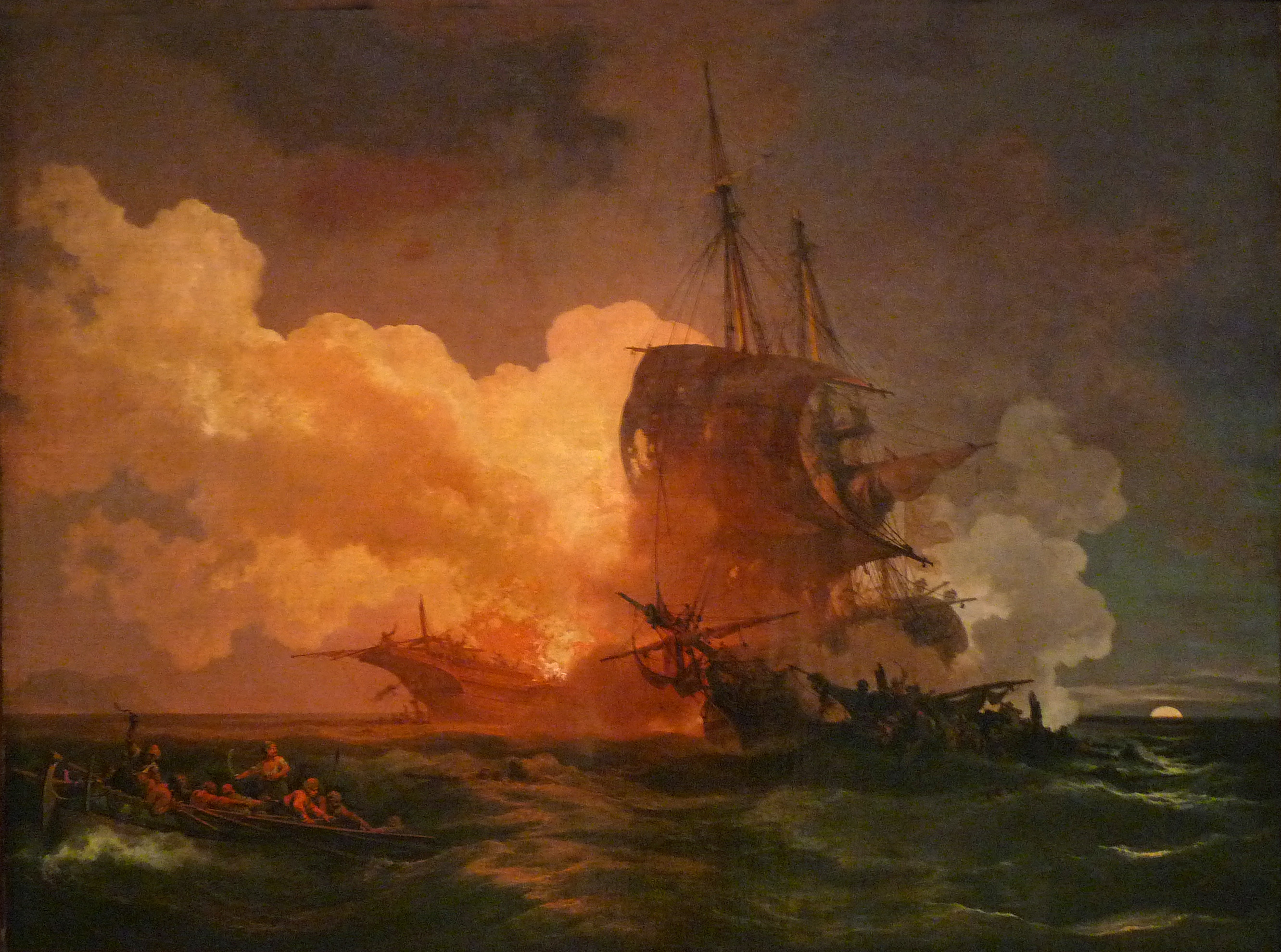
Maltese Ship Attacked by Algerian Pirates, 1765

Morning After the Rain, 1765

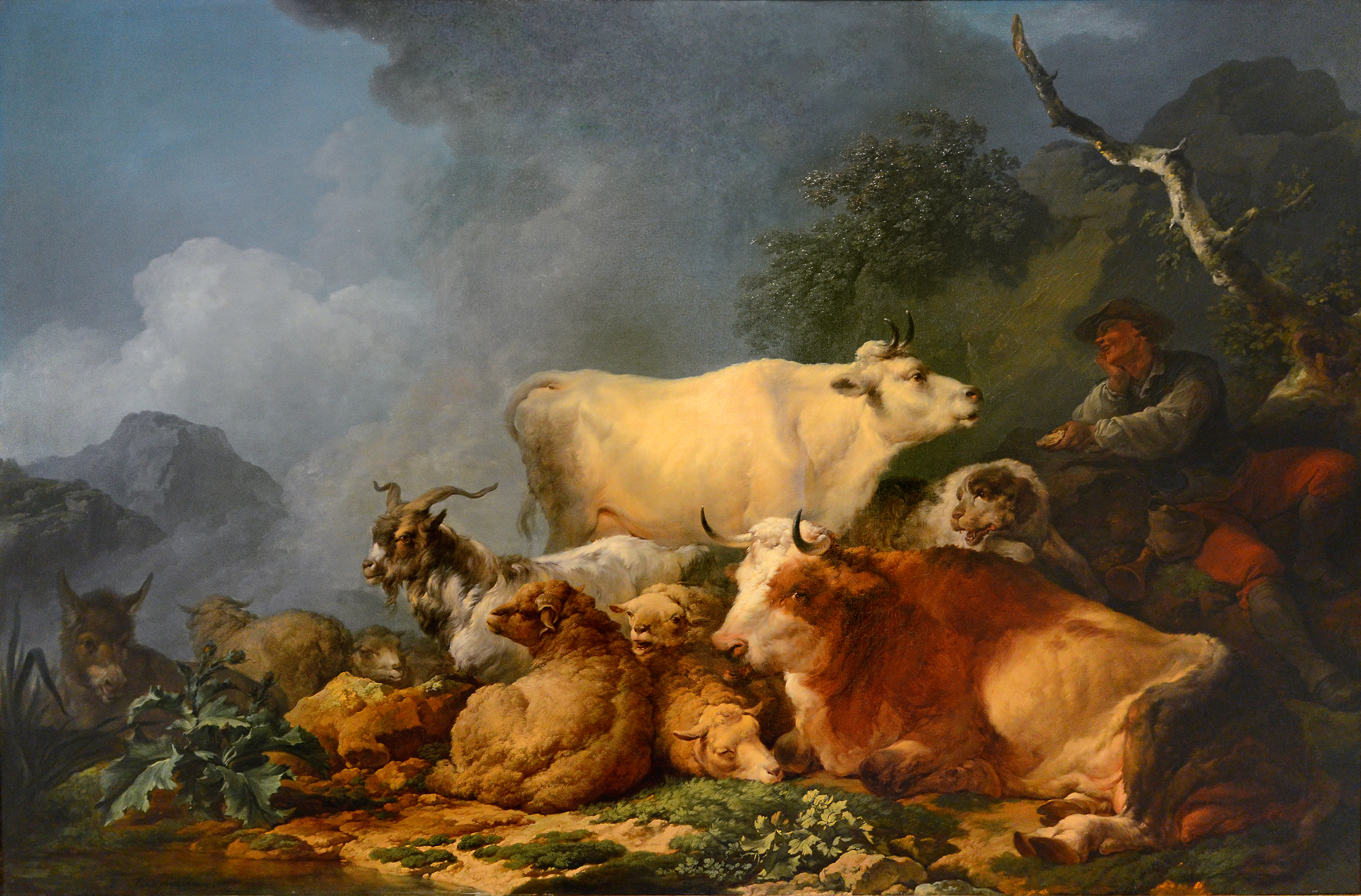
Landscape with Animals, 1767

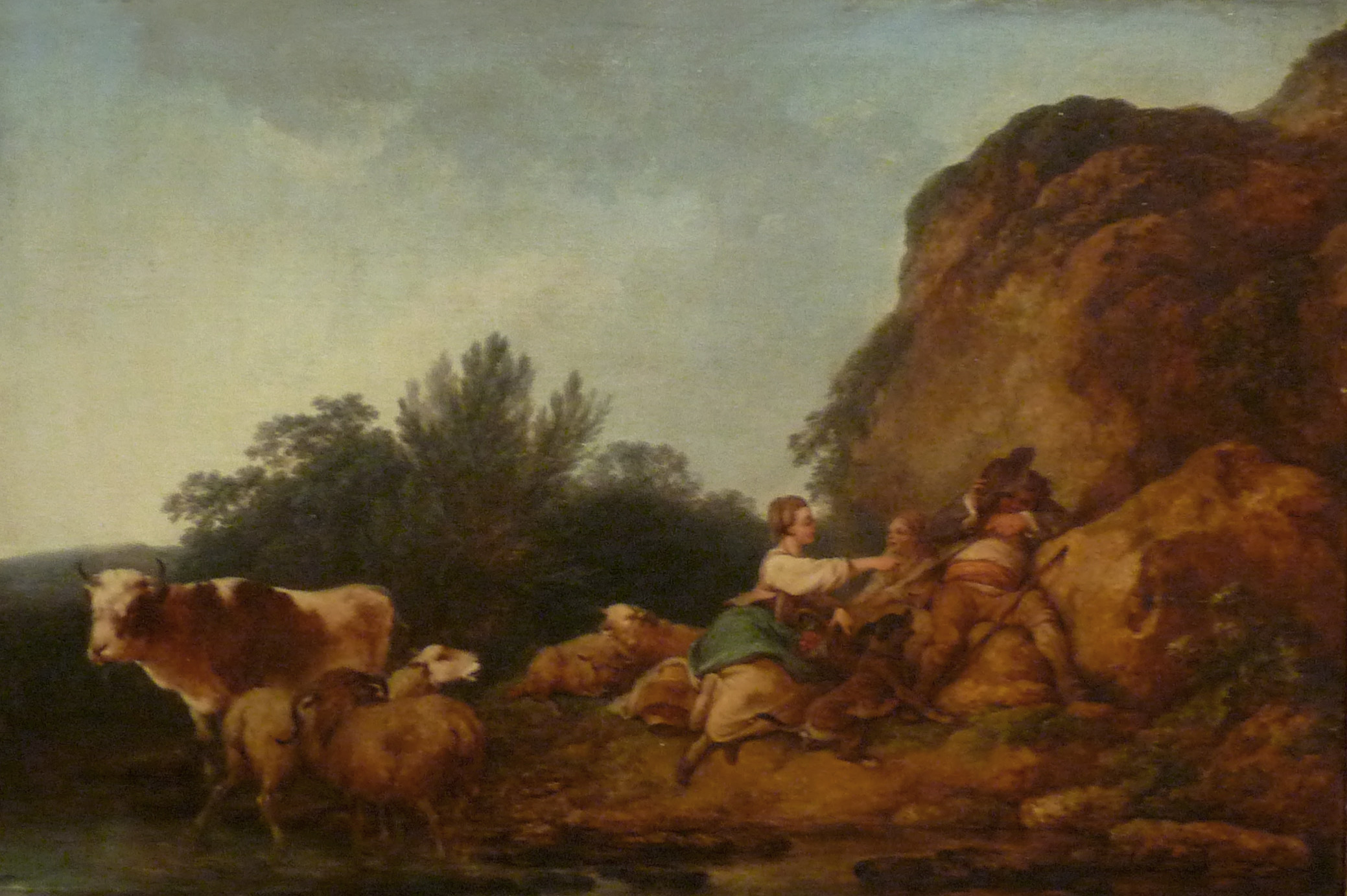
The Cherry Eater, 1771

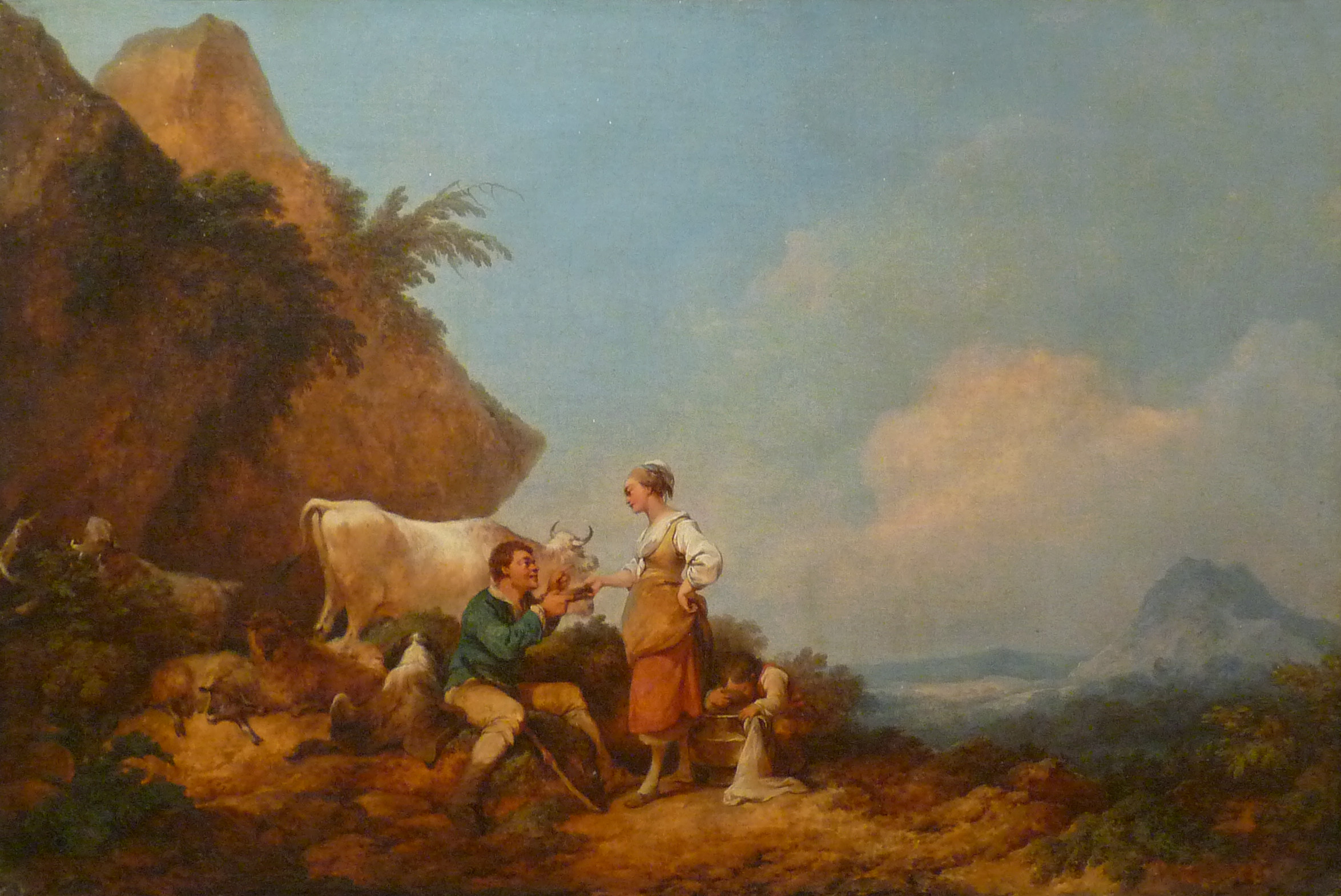
The Little Milkmaid, 1771

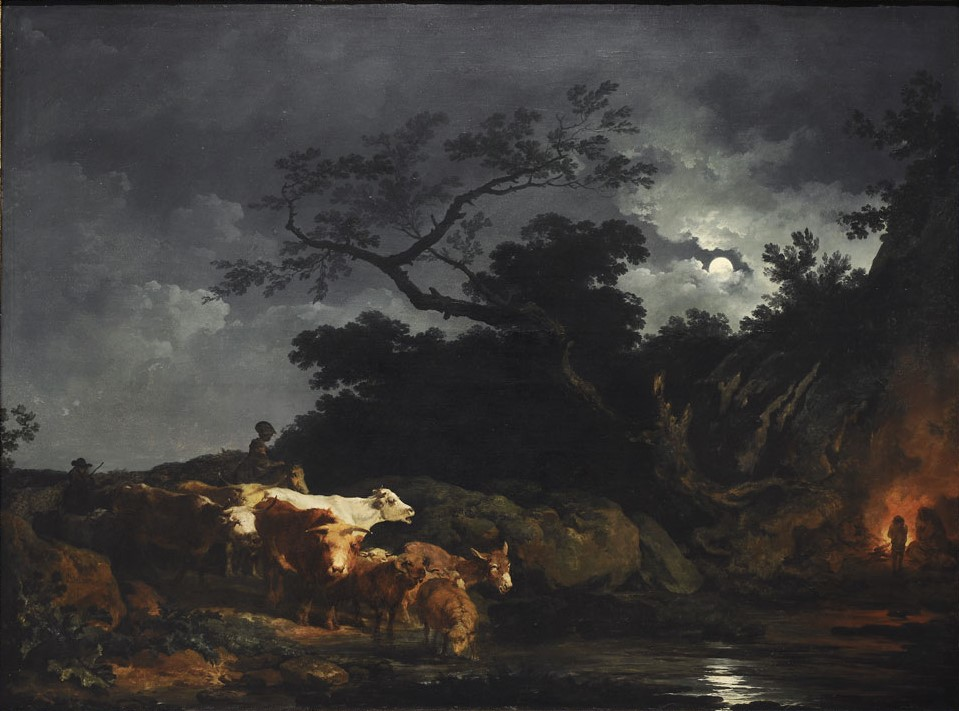
Moonlight, 1777

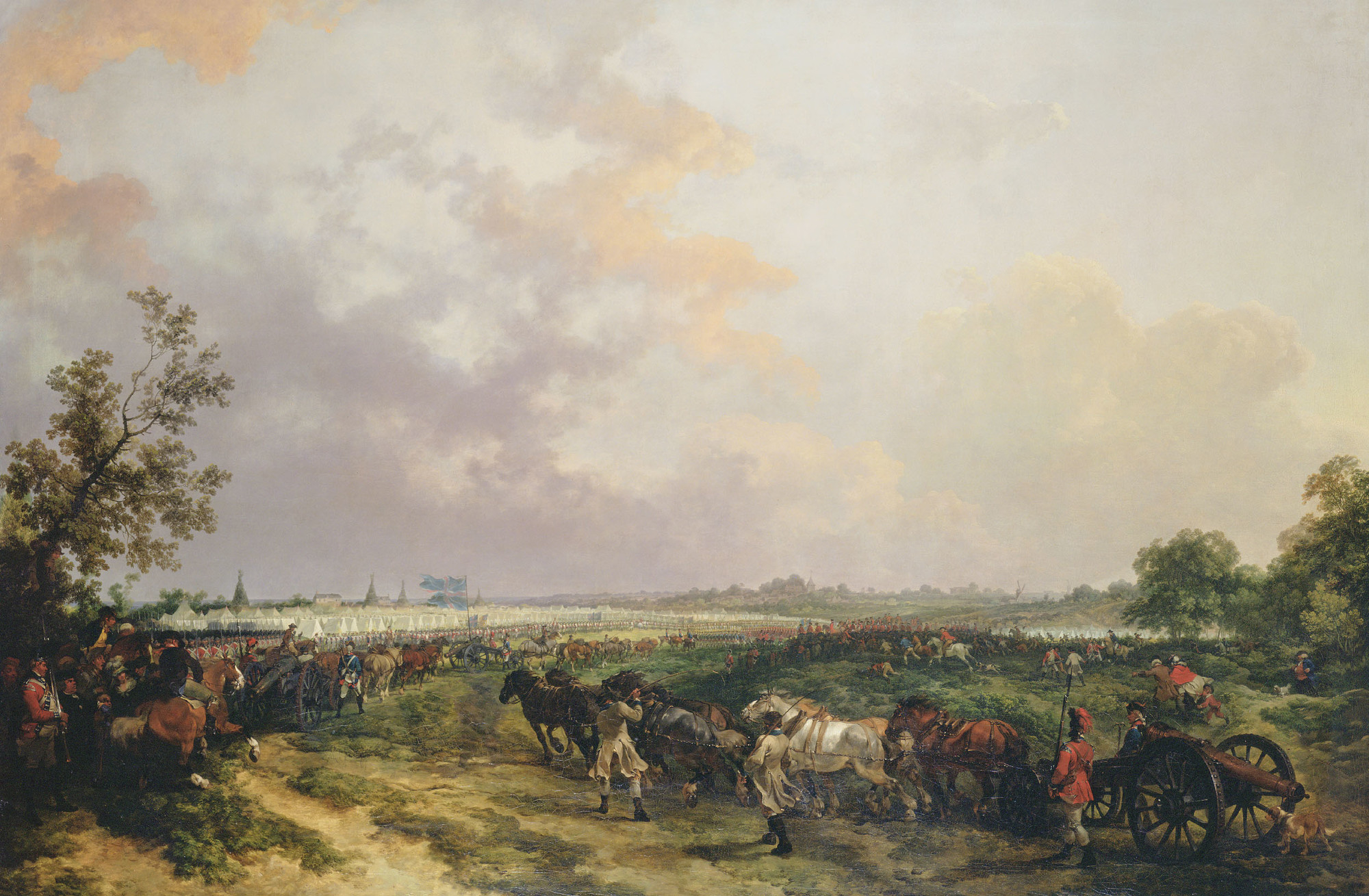
Warley Camp, 1780

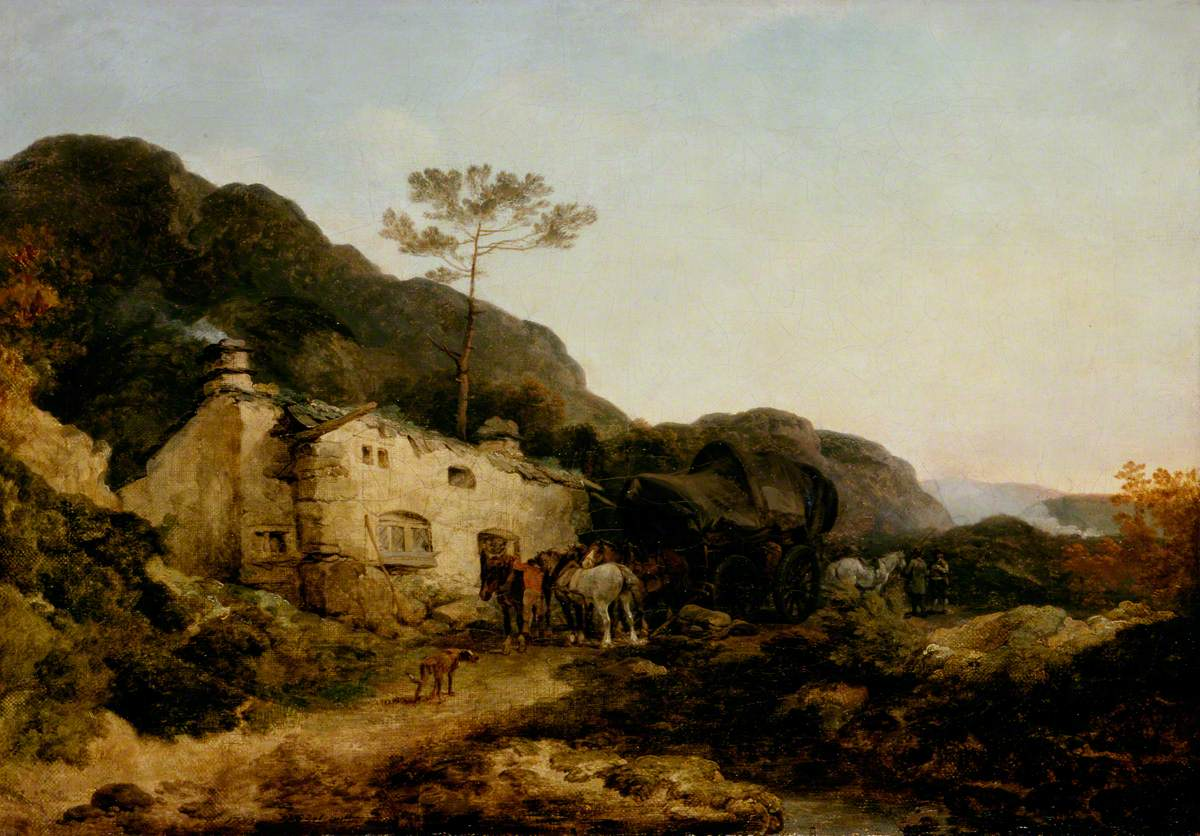
A Cottage in Patterdale, Westmoreland, 1783

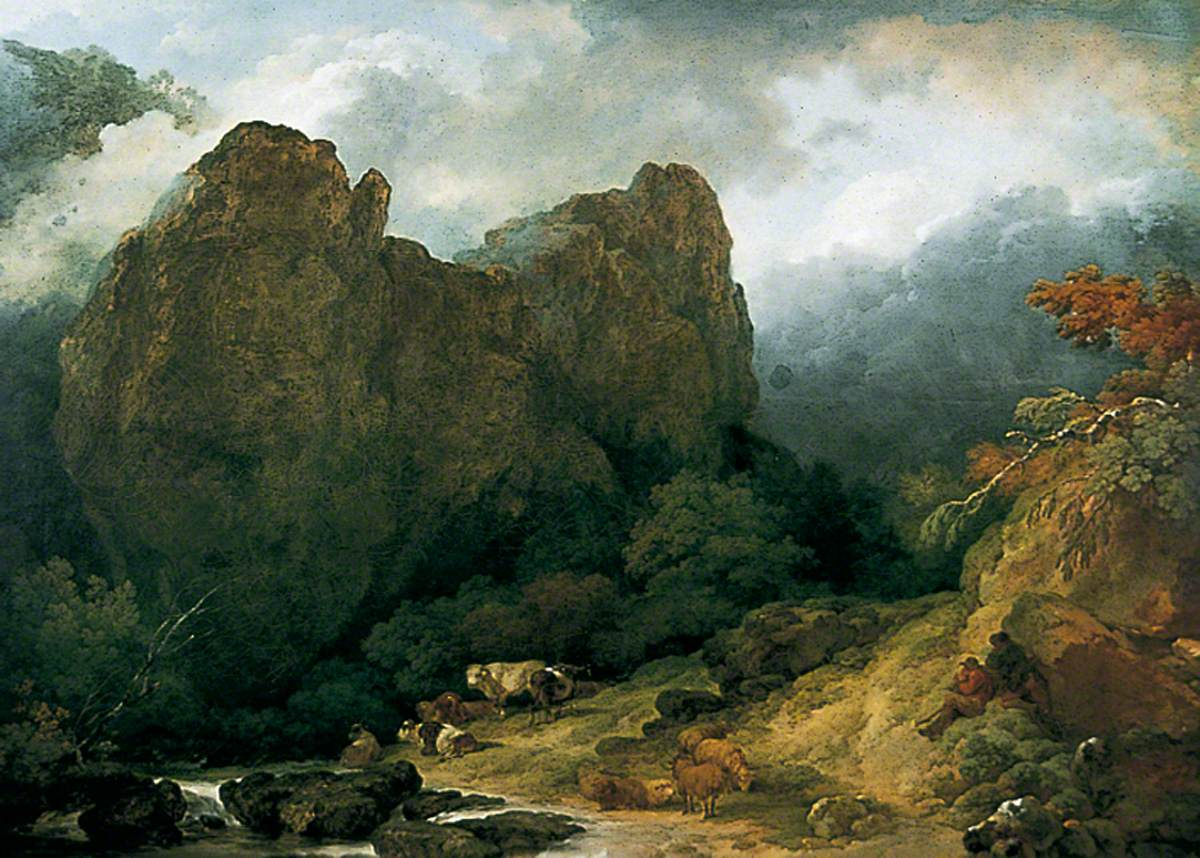
Dovedale in Derbyshire, 1784

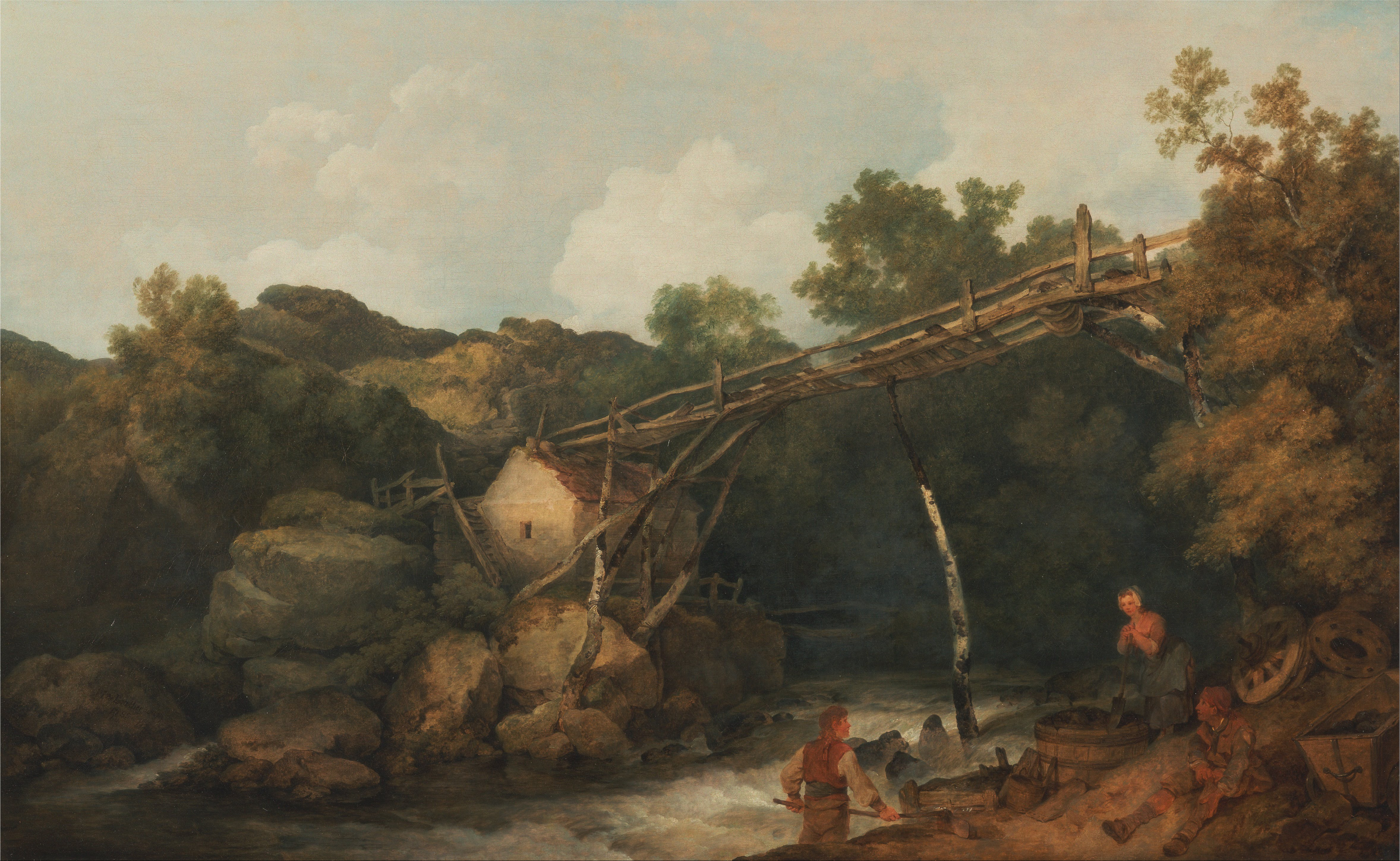
A View near Matlock, Derbyshire, 1785

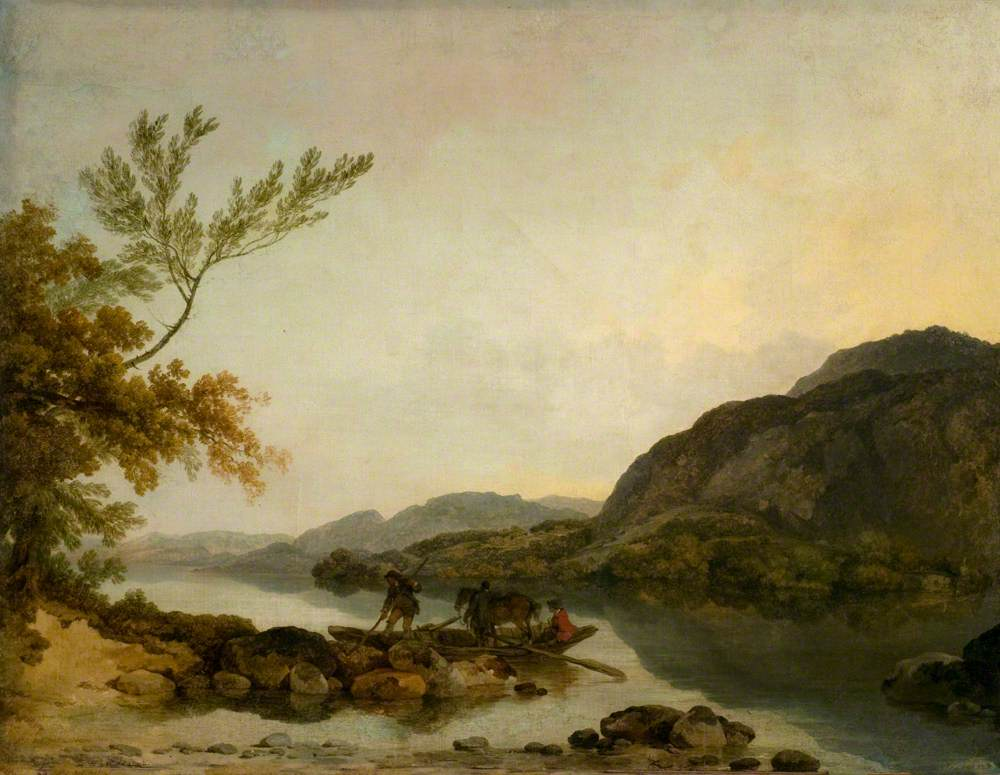
A River Scene with a Ferry, 1786

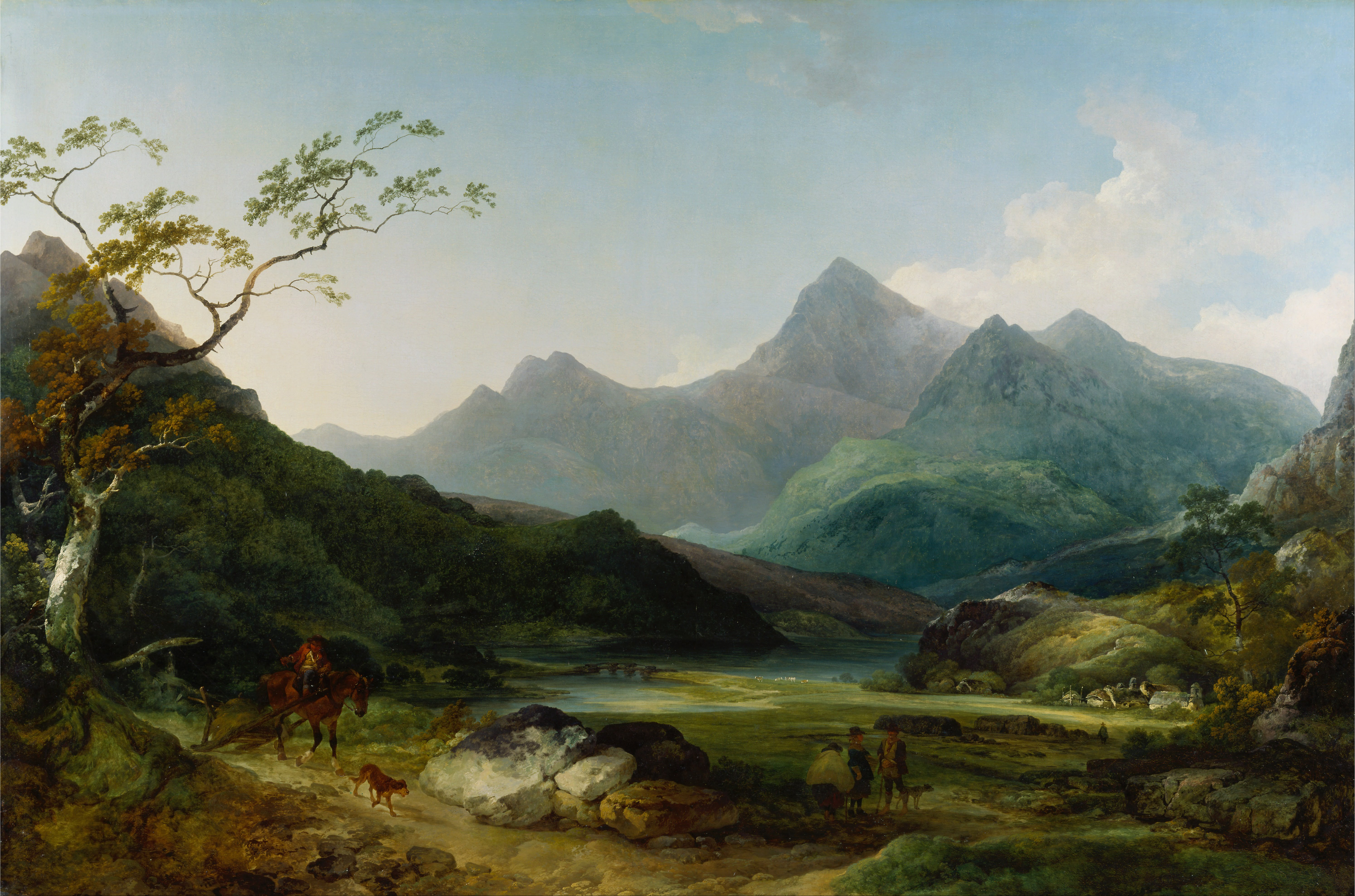
Snowdon from Capel Curig, 1787

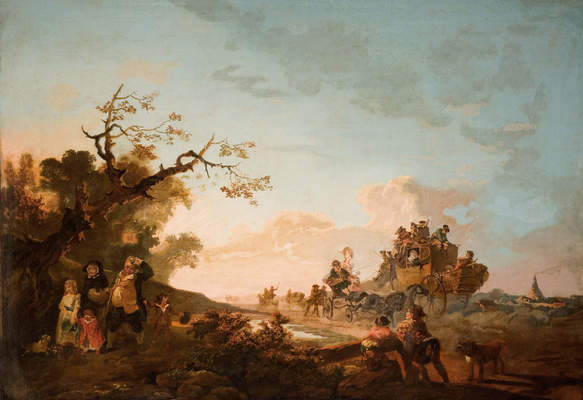
Hampstead Heath, Summer, 1787

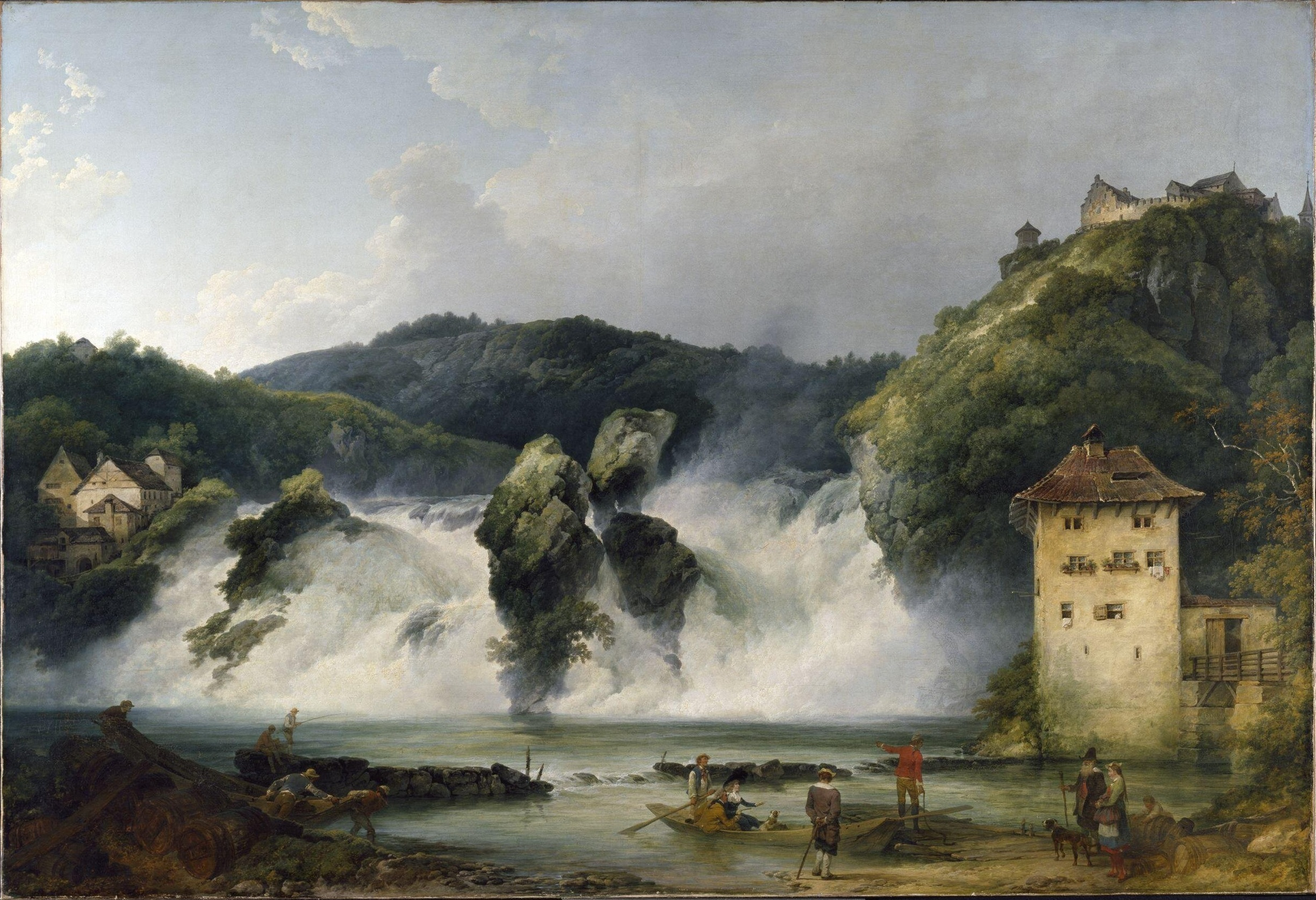
The Falls of the Rhine at Schaffhausen, 1788

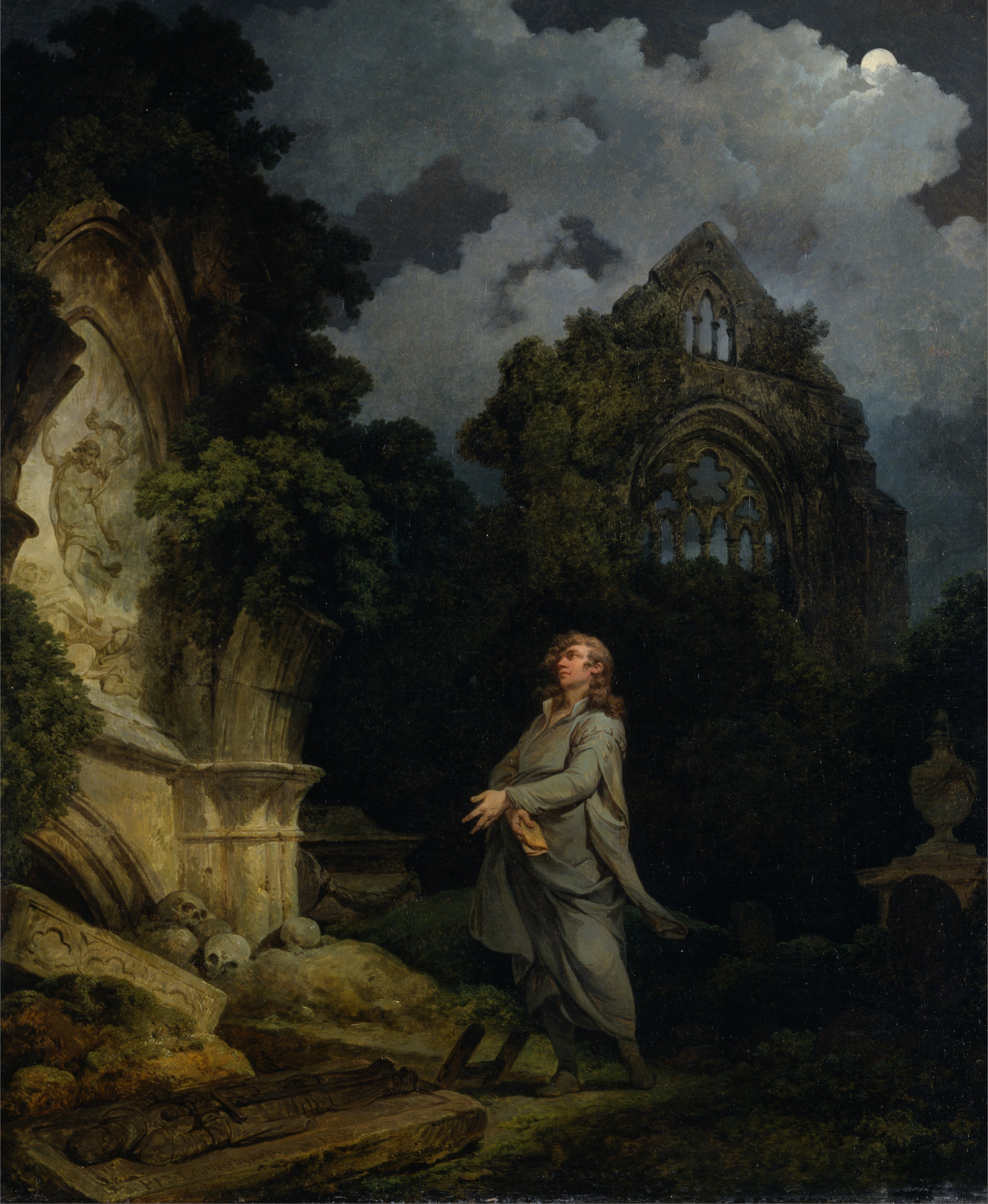
Visitor to a Moonlit Churchyard, 1790

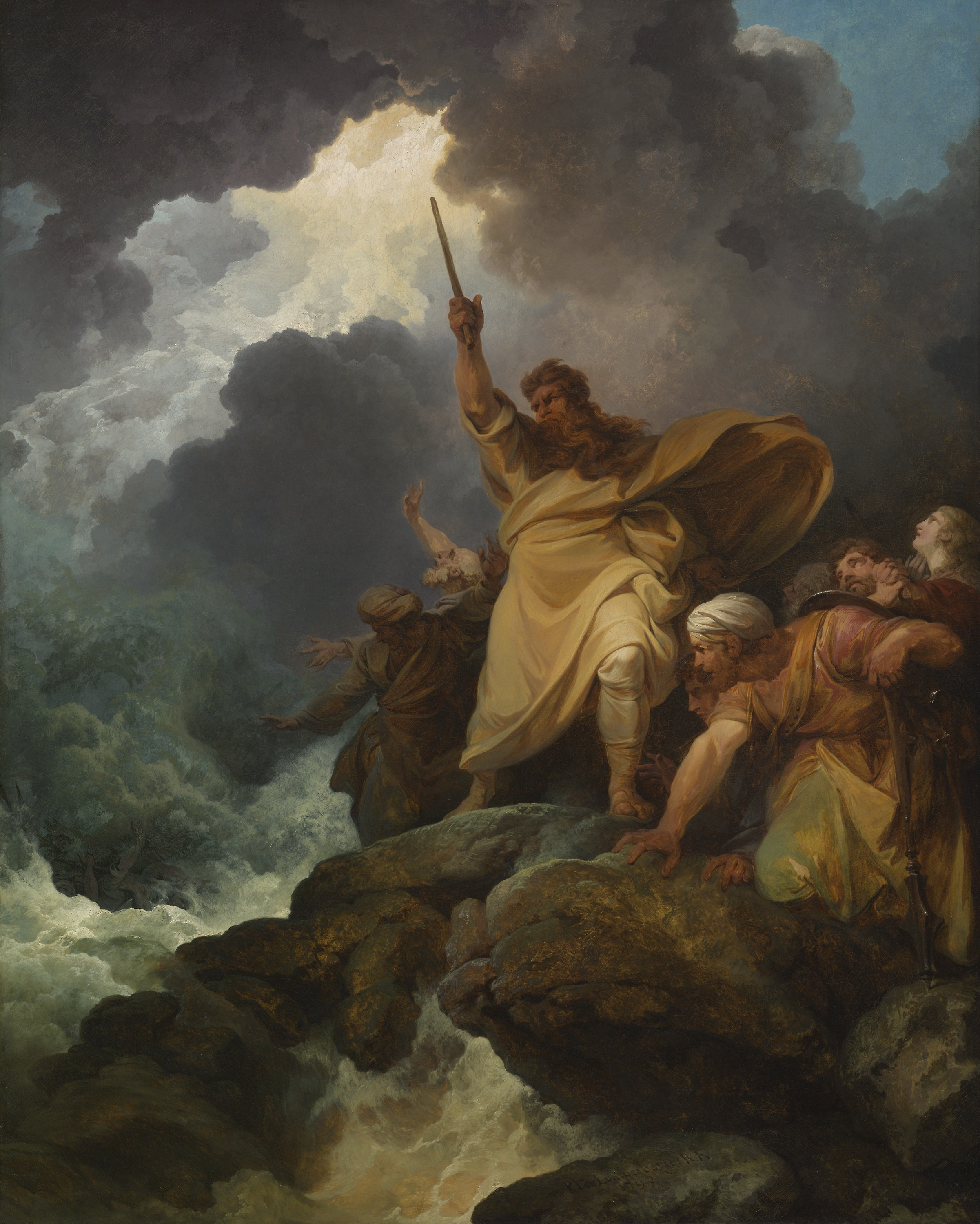
The Destruction of Pharaoh's Army, 1792

The Shipwreck, 1793

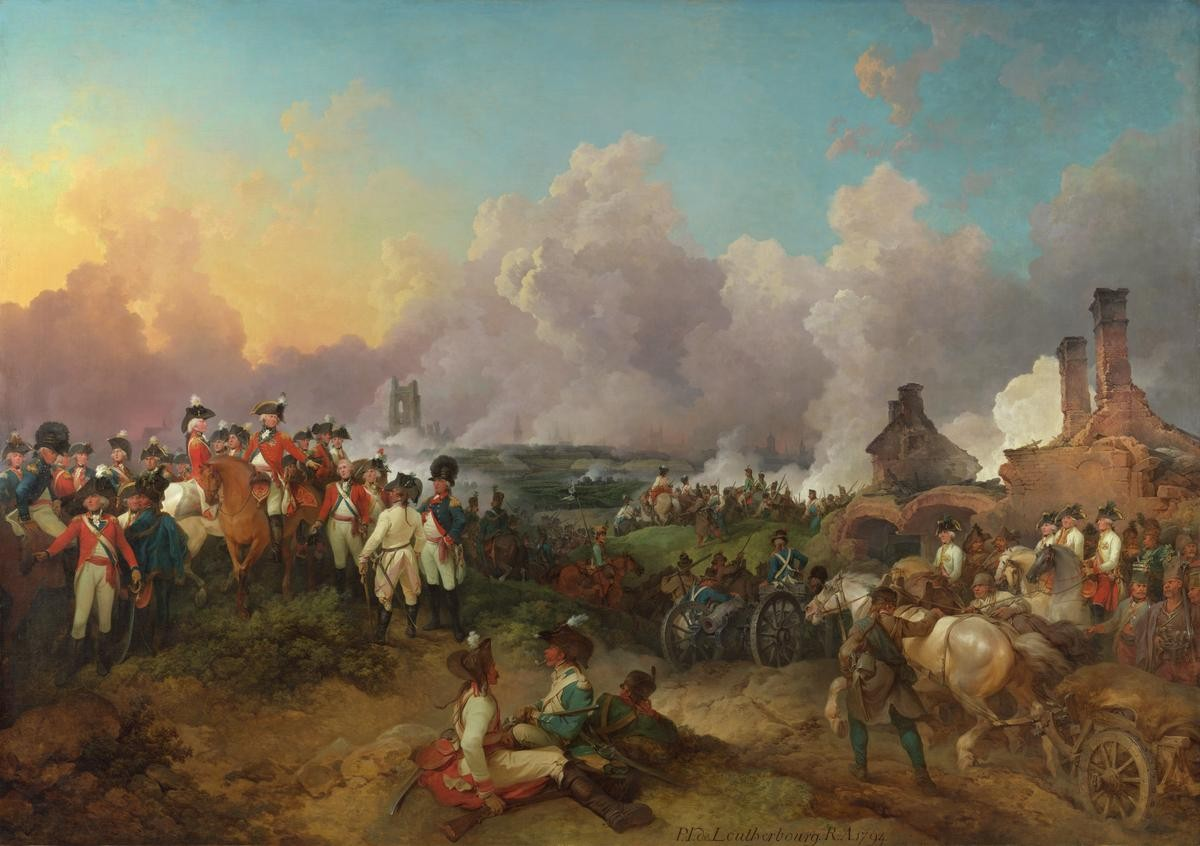
The Grand Attack on Valenciennes, 1794

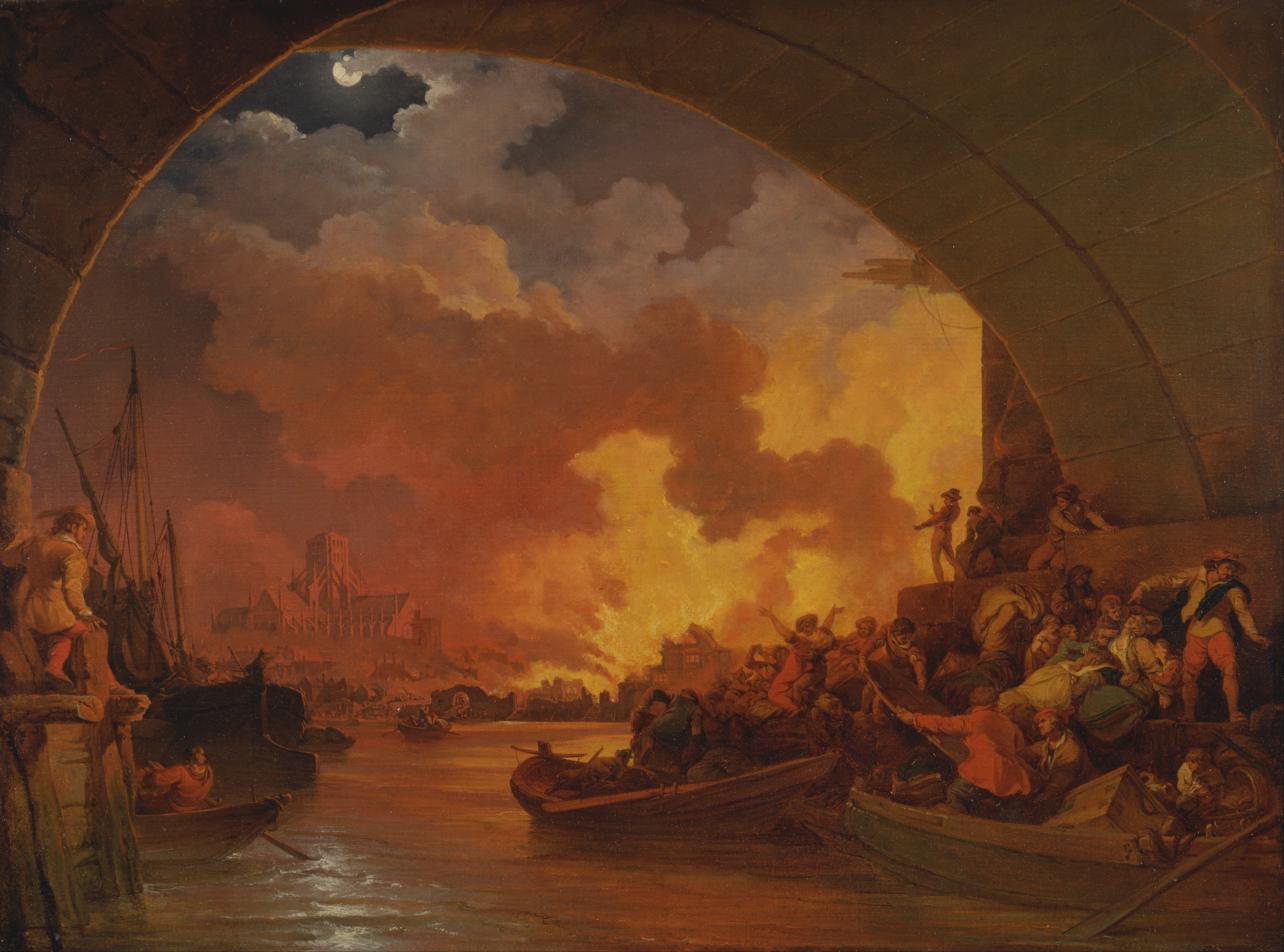
The Great Fire of London, 1797

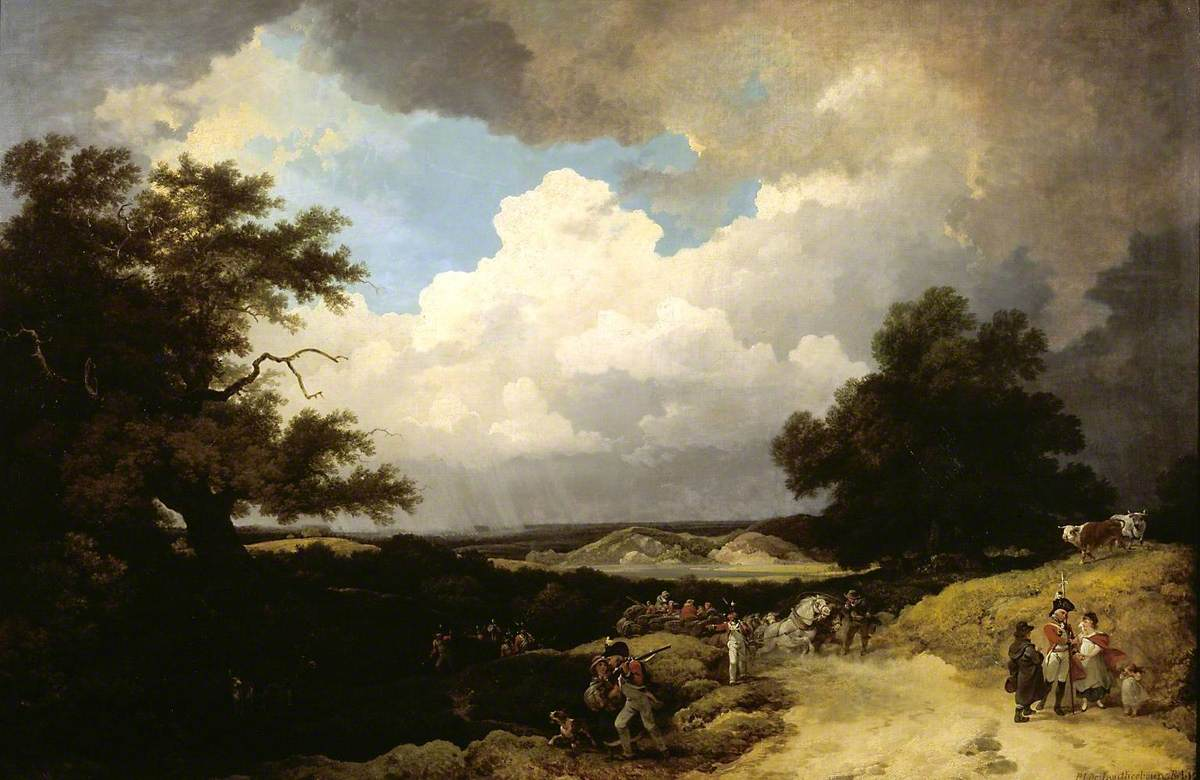
A Distant Hail-Storm Coming On, 1799

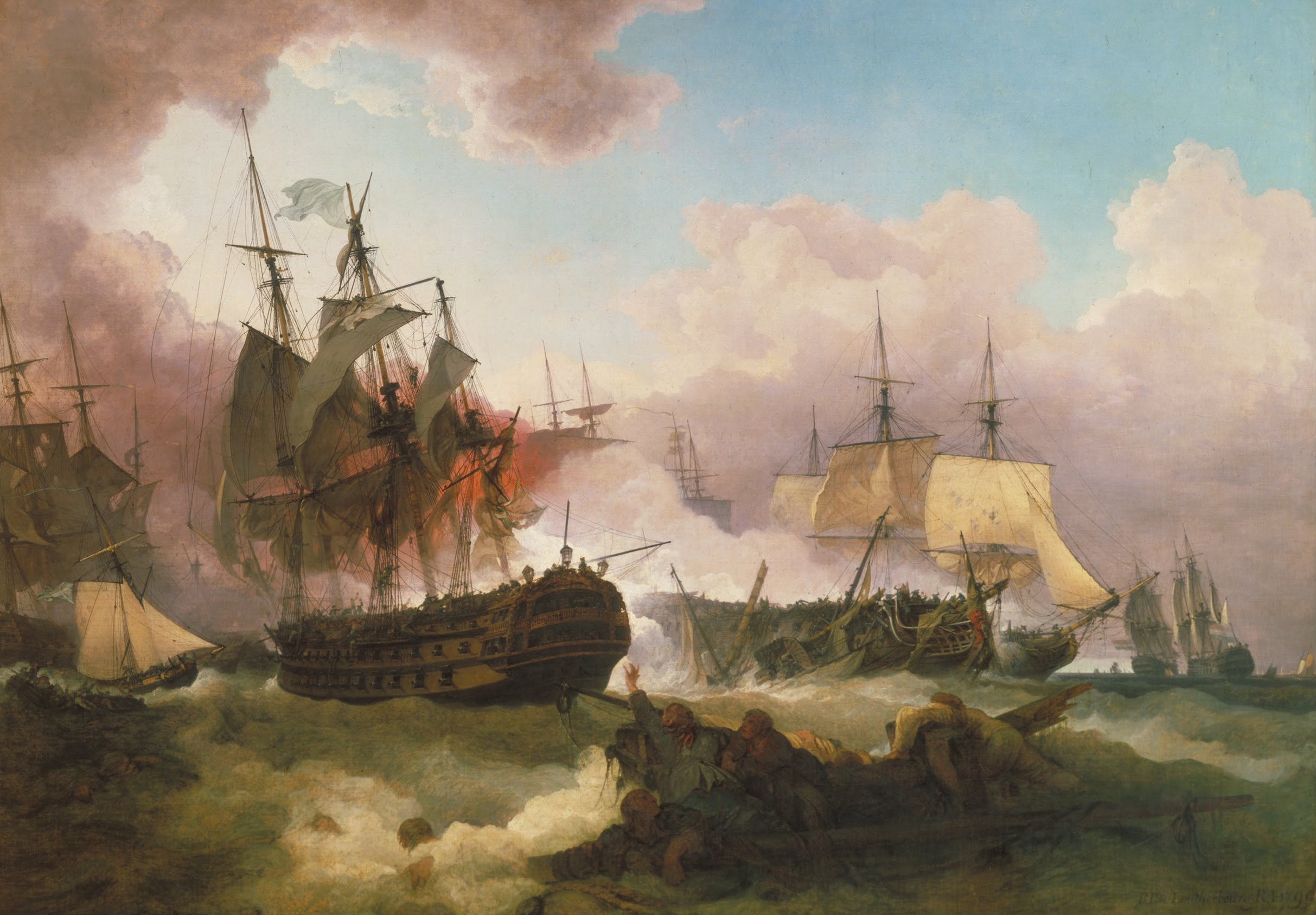
The Battle of Camperdown, 1799

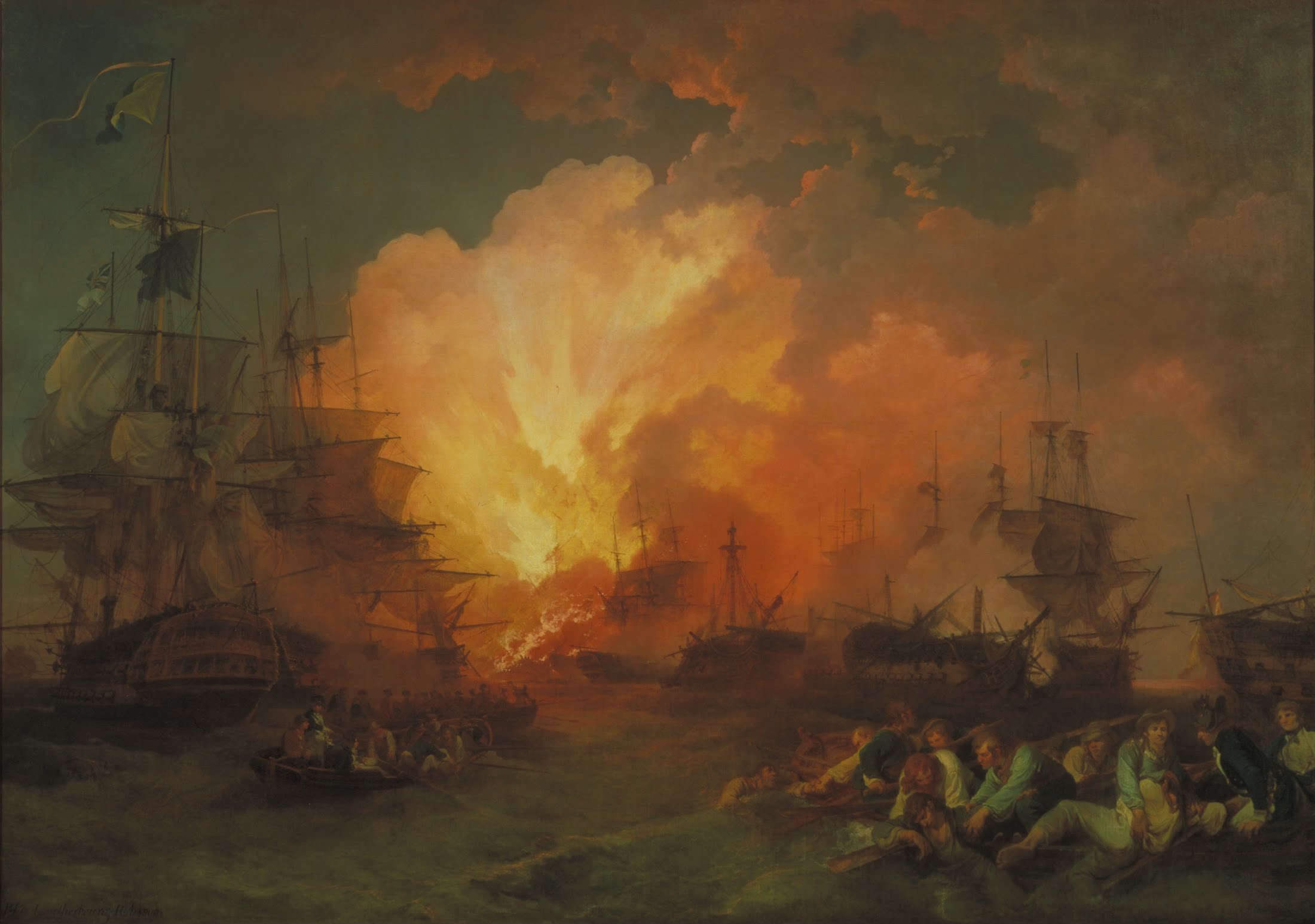
The Battle of the Nile, 1800

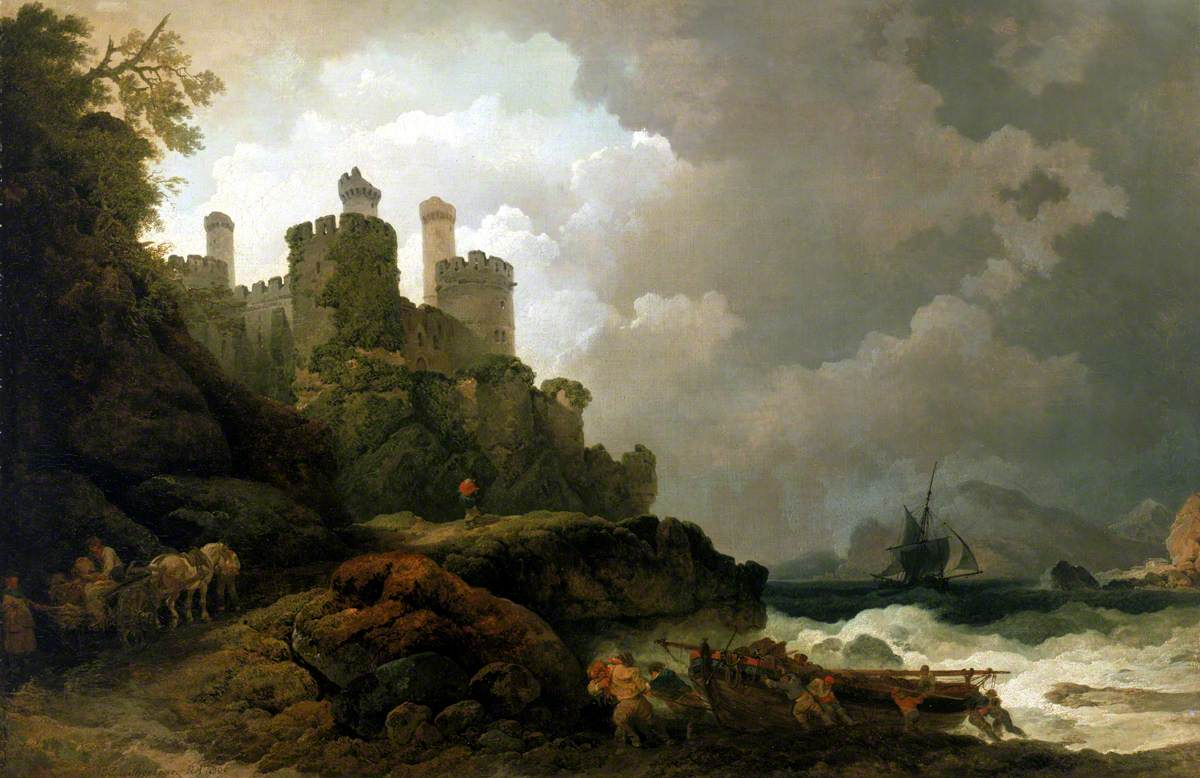
A Fishing Boat Brought Ashore near Conway Castle, 1800

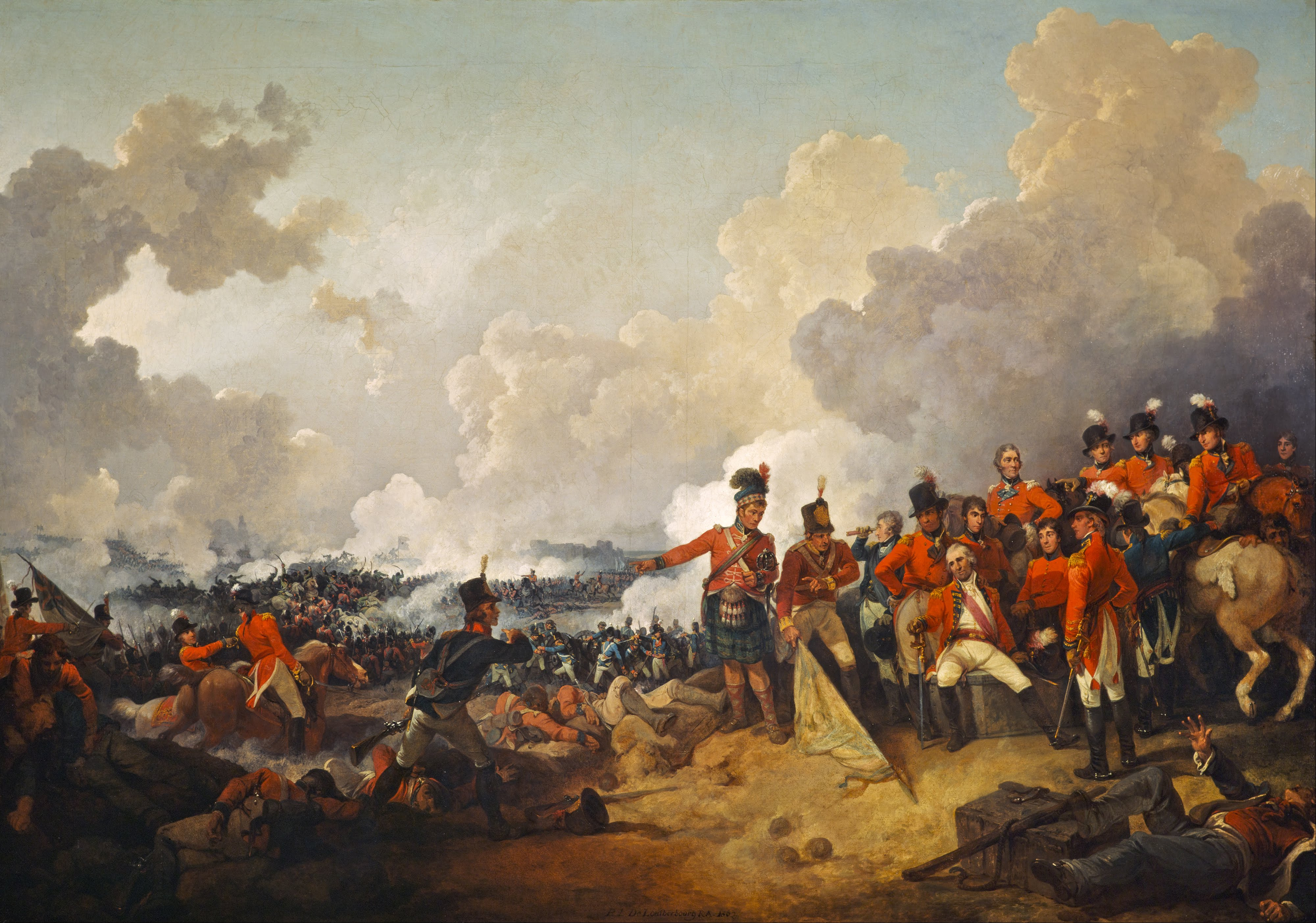
The Battle of Alexandria, 1802

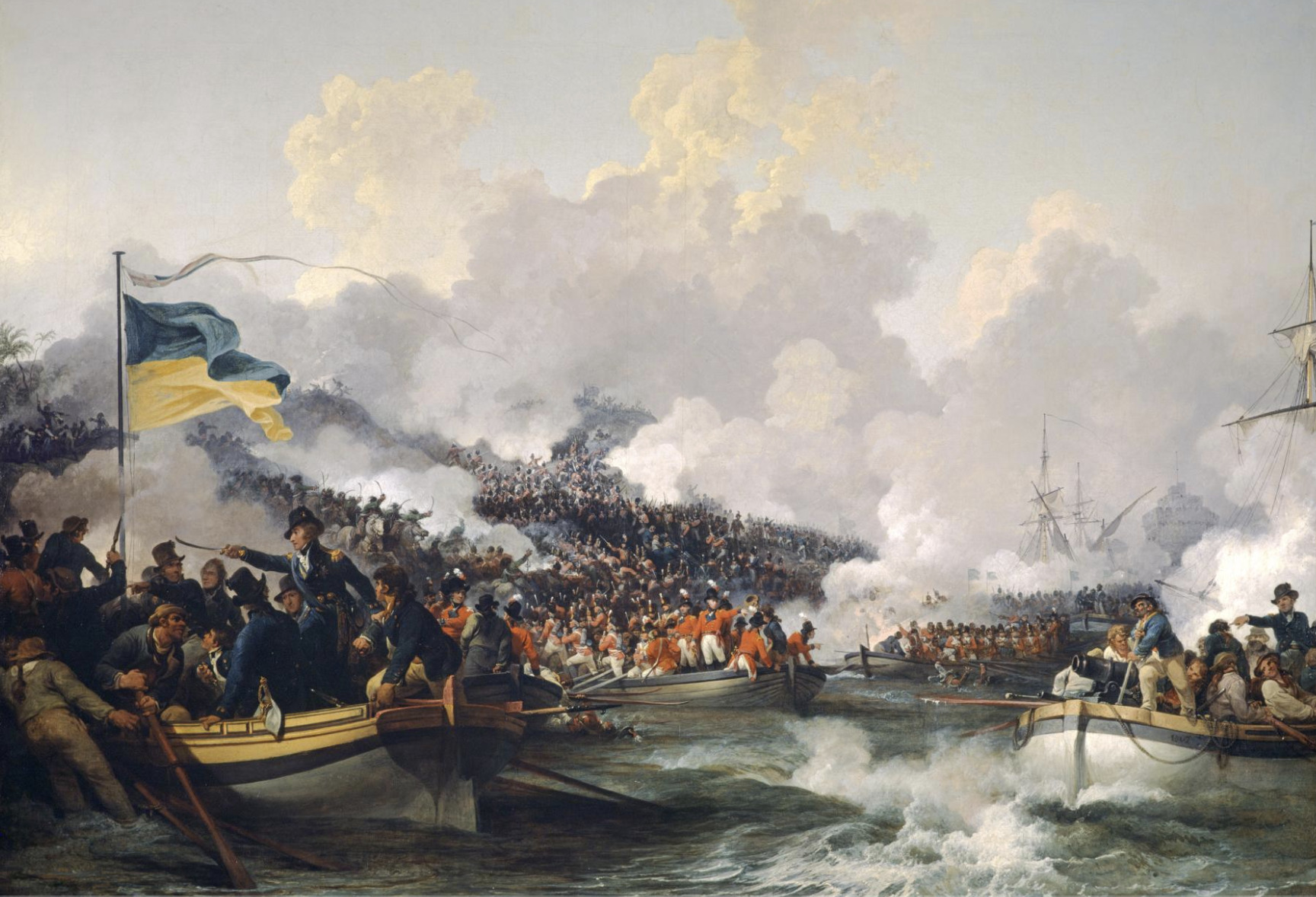
The Landing of British Troops at Aboukir, 1802

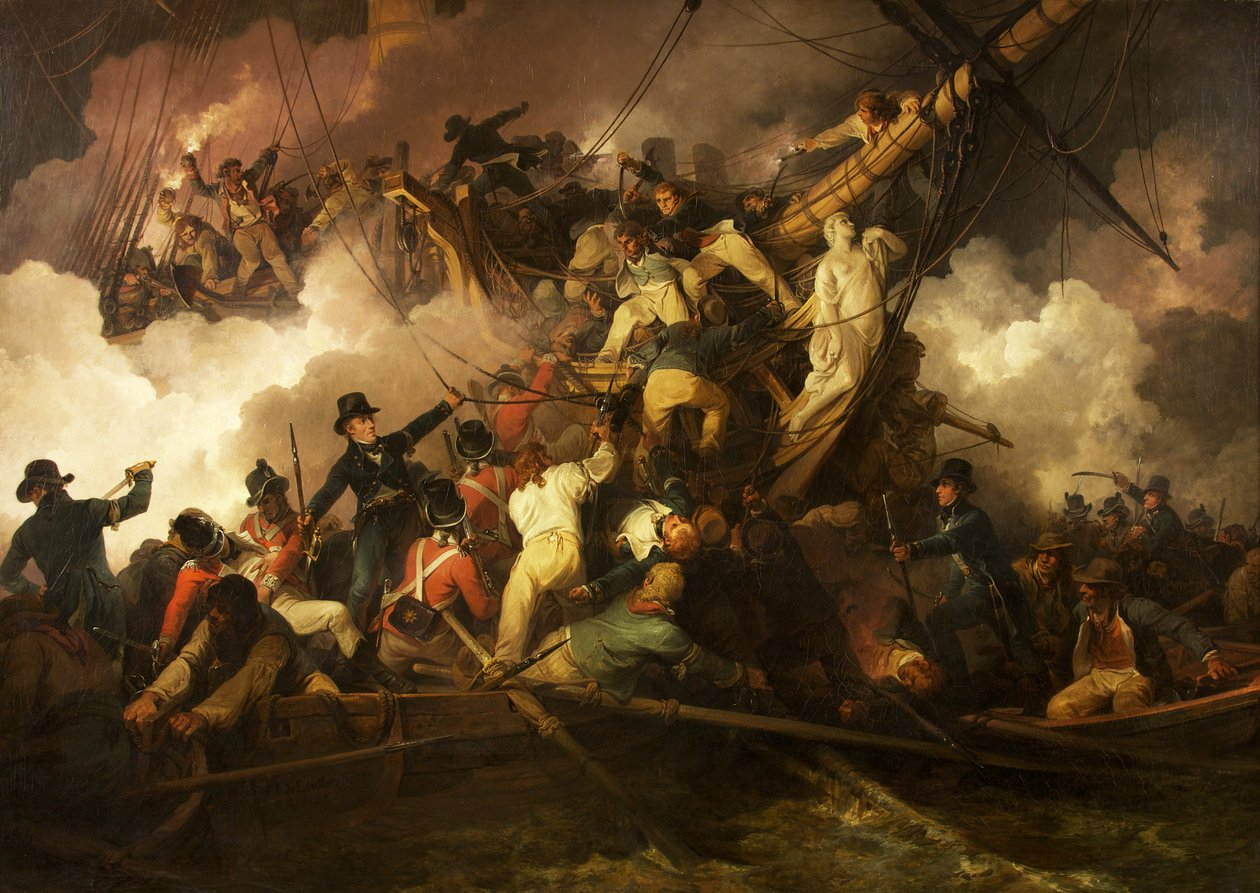
The Cutting-Out of the French corvette La Chevrette, 1802

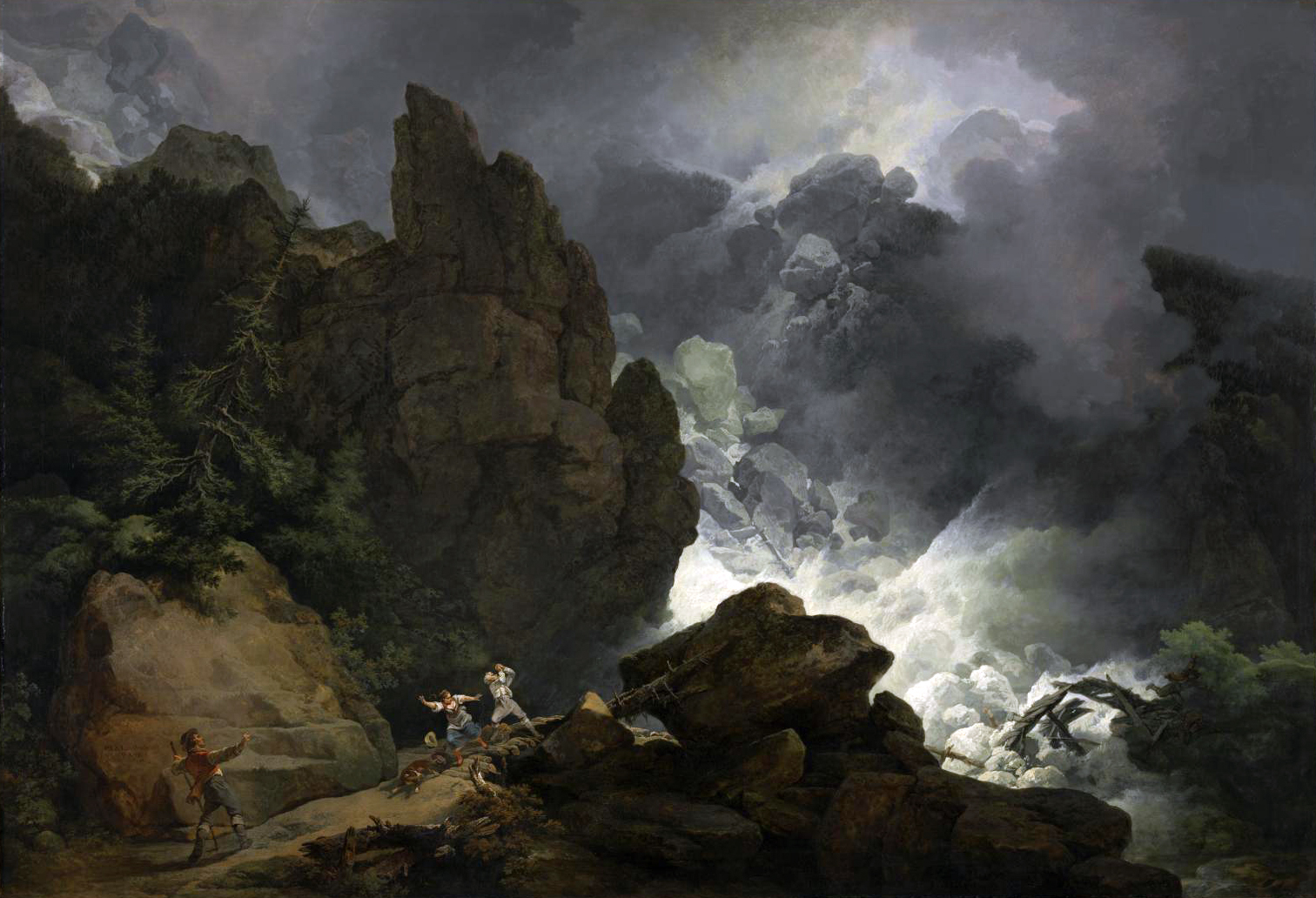
An Avalanche in the Alps, 1803

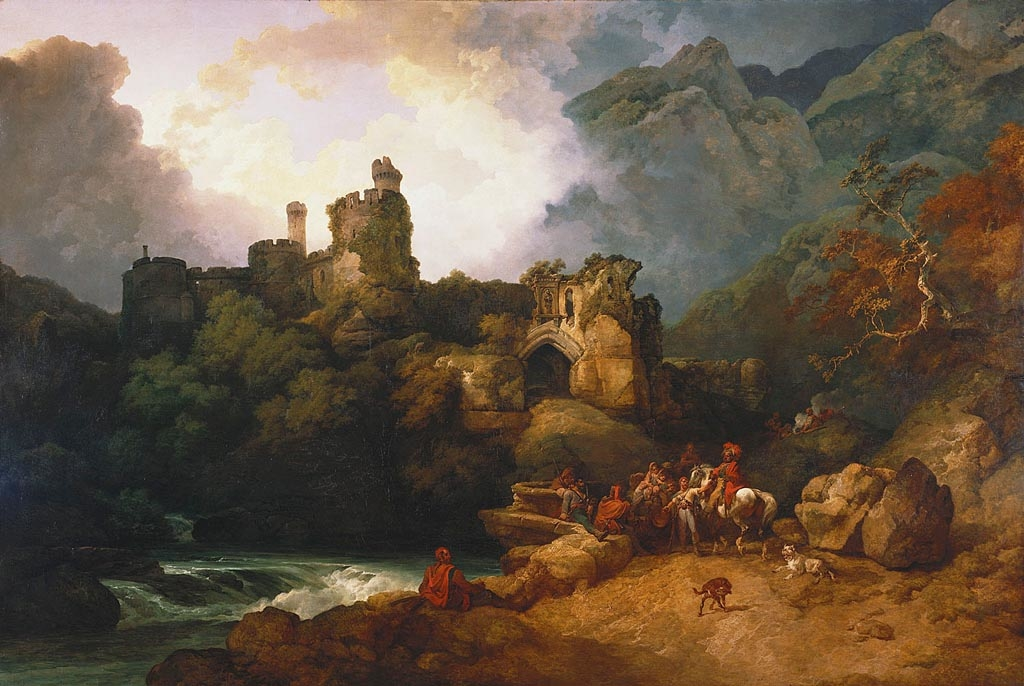
Banditti in a Landscape, 1804

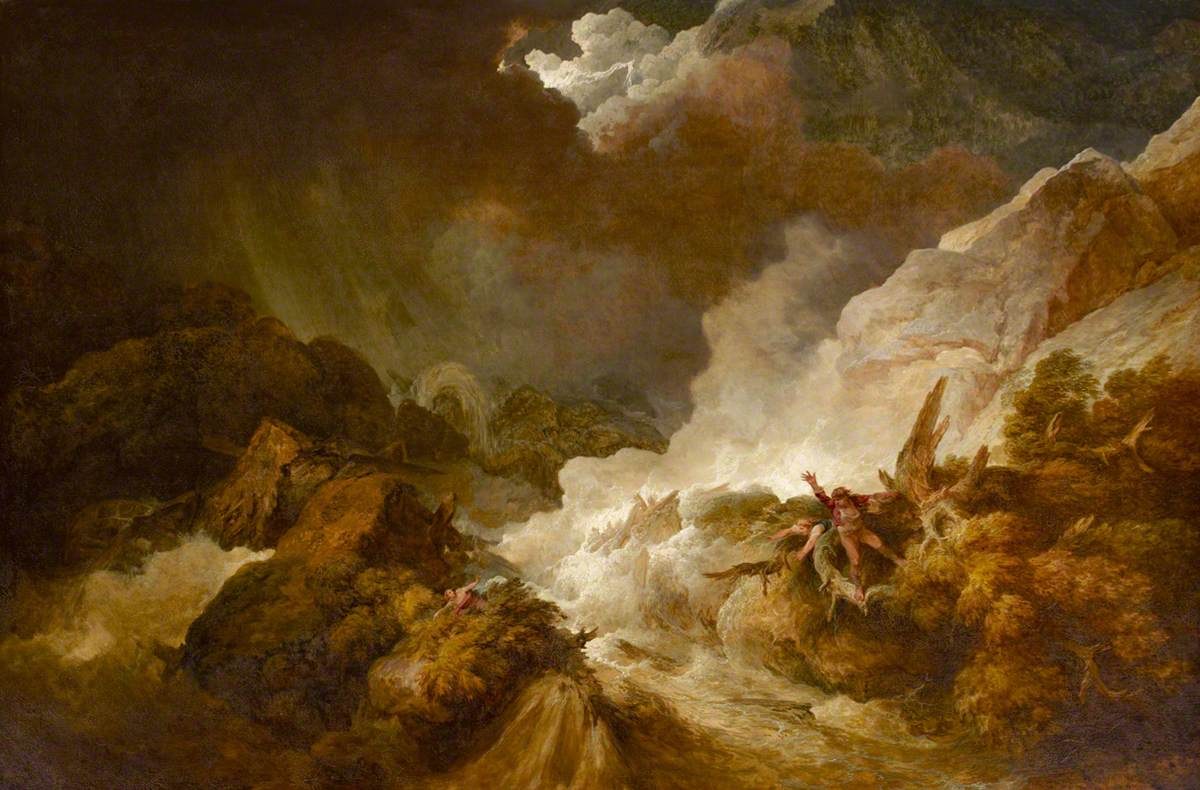
Storm and Avalanche near the Scheidegg in the Valley of Lauterbrunnen, 1804

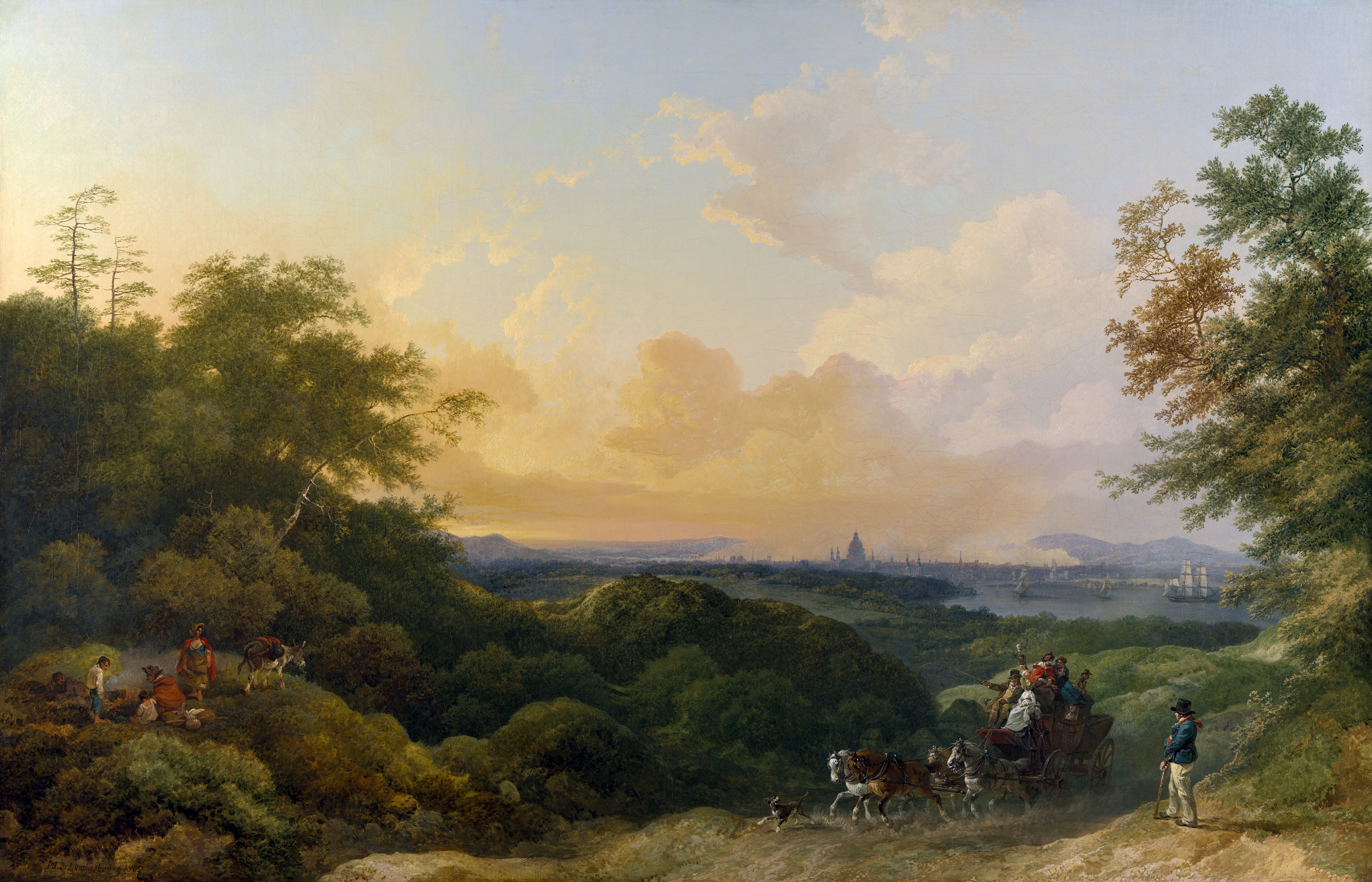
The Evening Coach, 1805

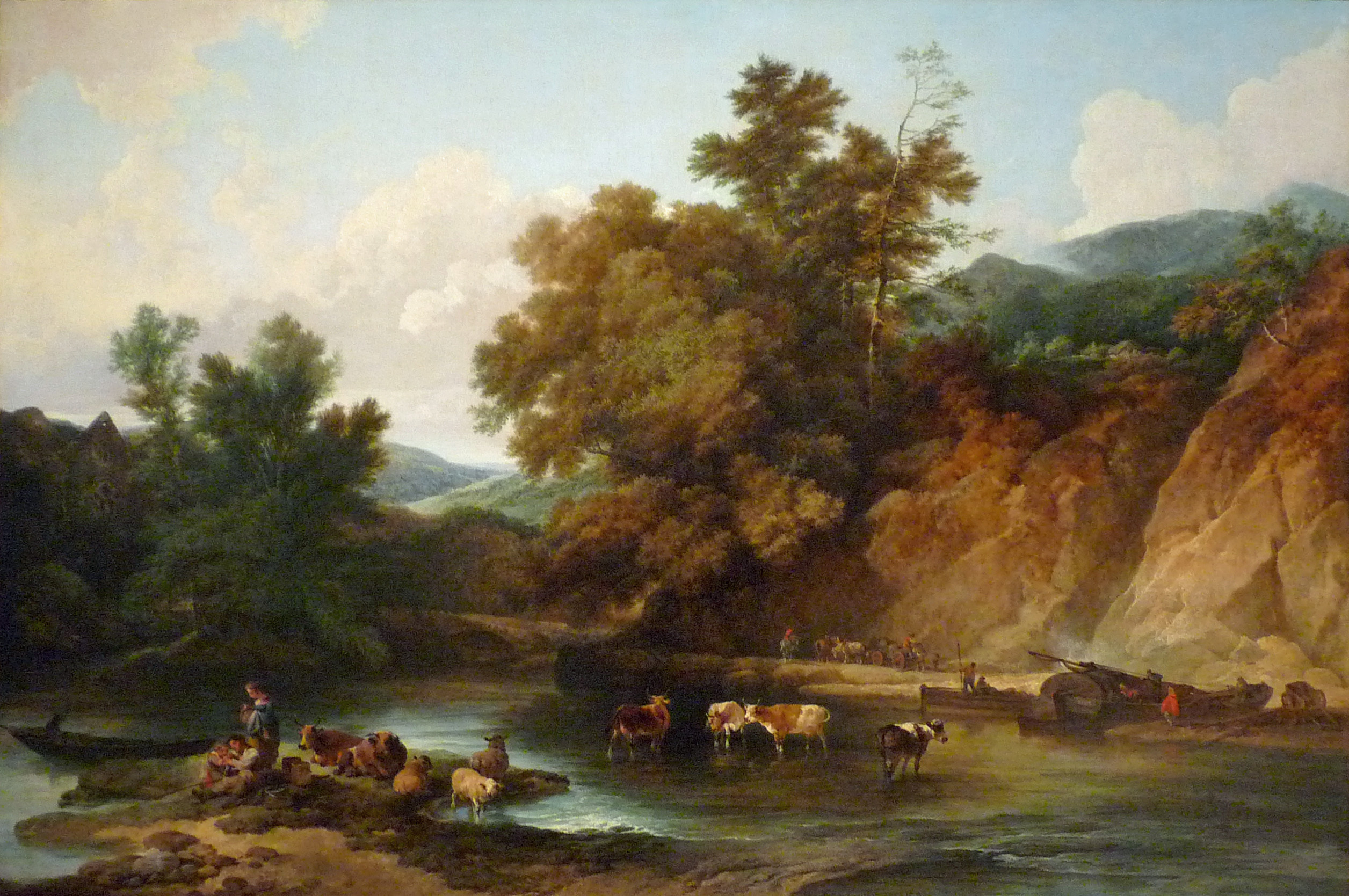
The River Wye at Tintern Abbey, 1805

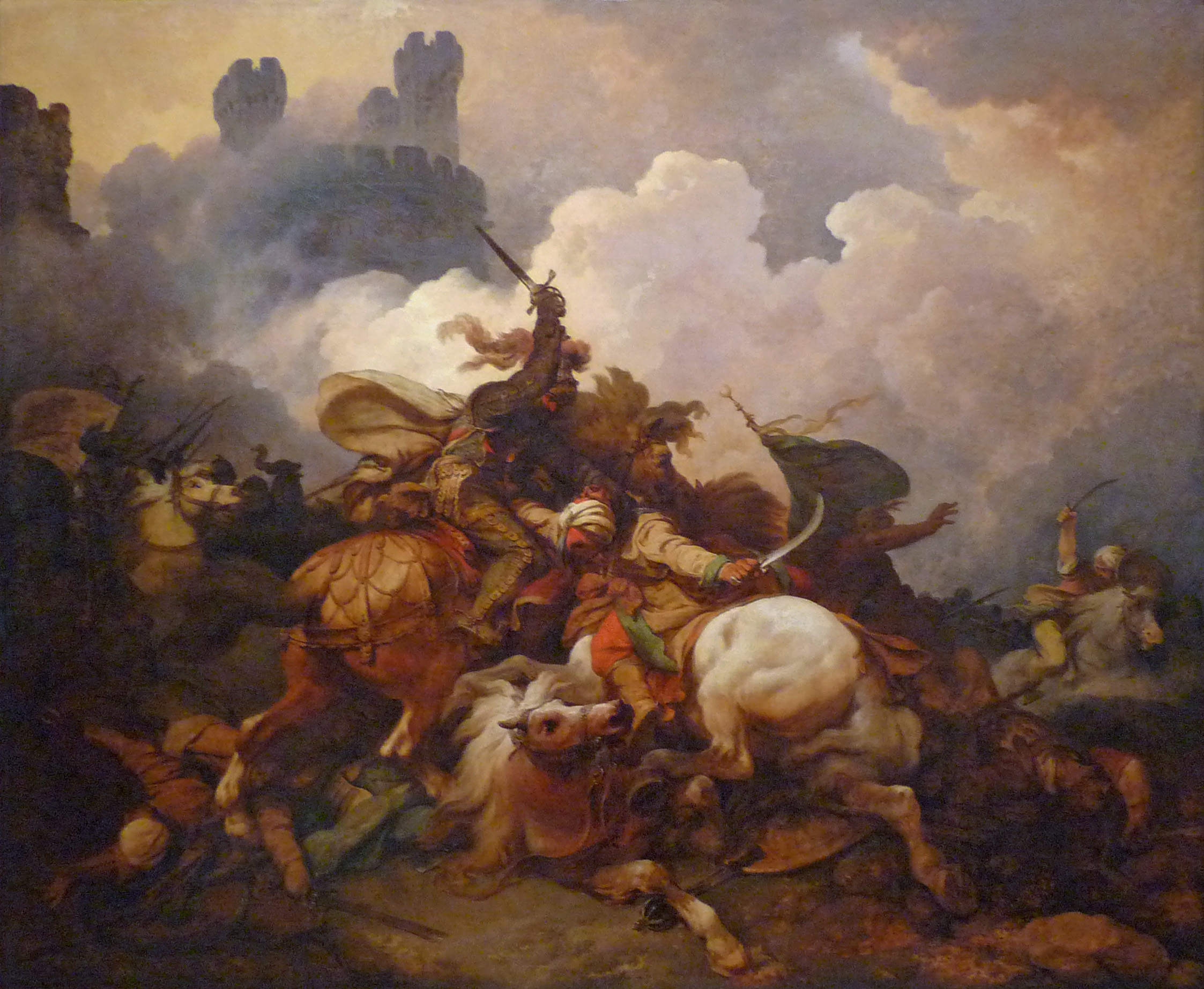
Richard the Lionheart at Saint-Jean d'Acre, 1807

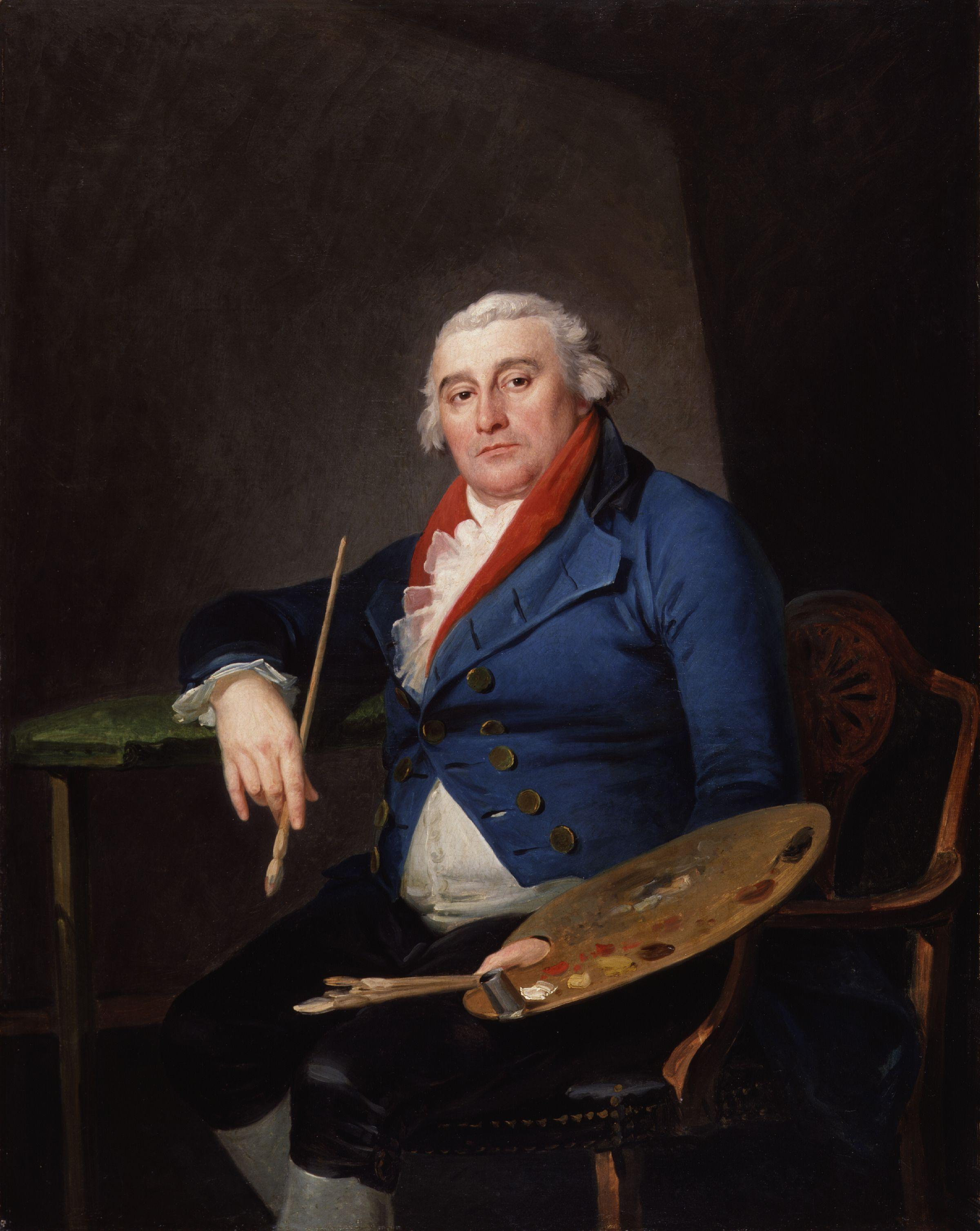
Self portrait, 1805–10
