= The Great Fire of London (painting) =

Painting by Philip James de Loutherbourg

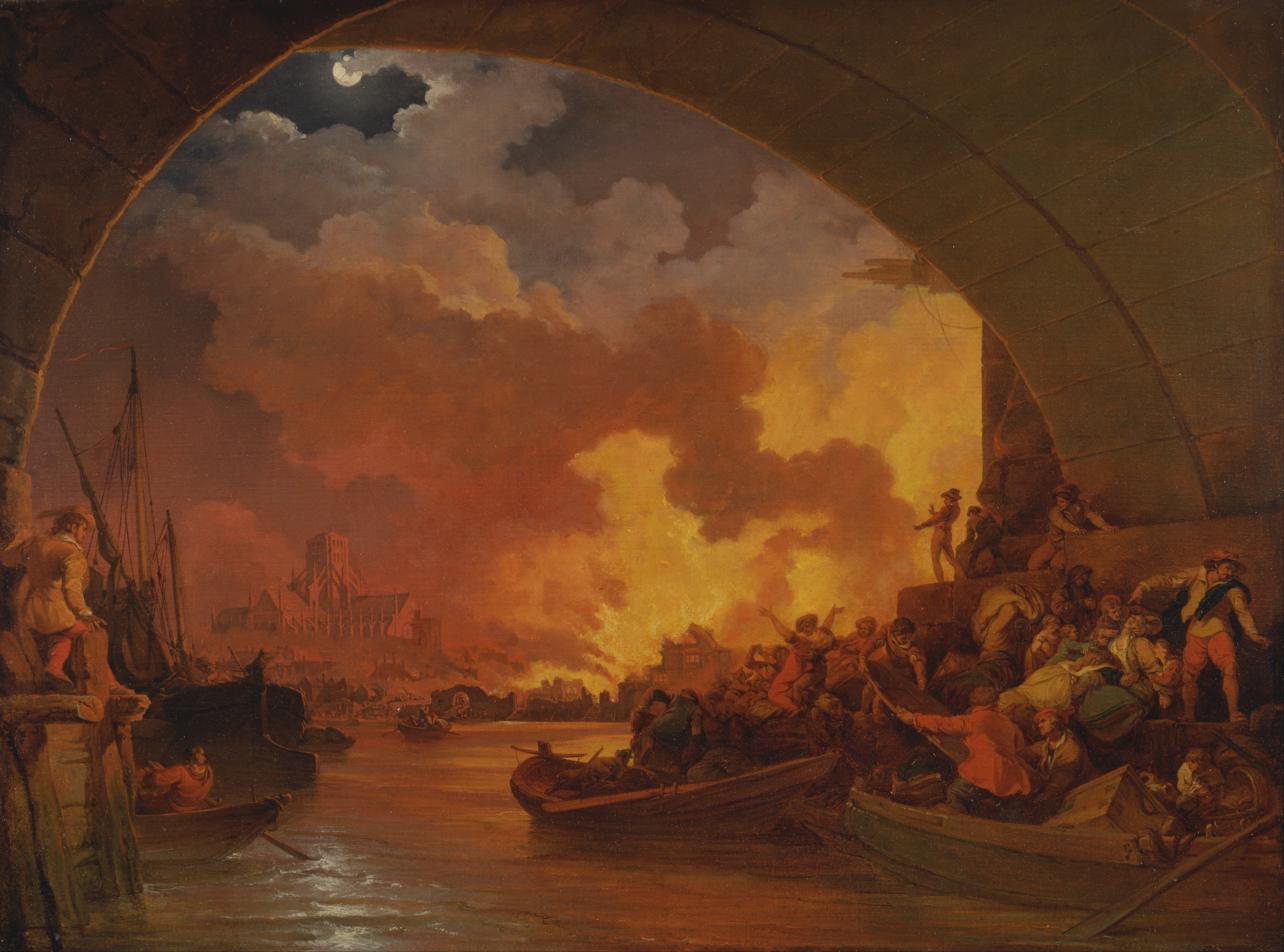
- Artist: Philip James de Loutherbourg
- Year: 1797
- Type: Oil on canvas, history painting
- Dimensions: 60 cm × 81.3 cm (24 in × 32.0 in)
- Location: Yale Center for British Art; New Haven

The Great Fire of London is an oil on canvas history painting by the French-born British artist Philip James de Loutherbourg, from 1797. It depicts the Great Fire of London in 1666 during the Restoration era. The blazing city is seen through the arches of London Bridge including the Old St Paul's Cathedral.

Loutherbourg was known for his expressive Romantic landscape paintings and battle scenes. Today the painting is in the collection of the Yale Center for British Art, in New Haven, having been acquired as part of the Paul Mellon Collection.

== Bibliography ==
- Preston, Lillian Elvira. Philippe Jacques de Loutherbourg: Eighteenth Century Romantic Artist and Scene Designer. University of Florida, 1977.
- Porter, Stephen. London A History in Paintings & Illustrations. Amberly Publishing, 2014.
- Solender, Katherine. Dreadful Fire!: Burning of the Houses of Parliament. Cleveland Museum of Art, 1984.
