= 1799 in art =

Events from the year 1799 in art.

== Events ==
- 19 March – Sculptor Jean-Jacques Castex leaves Cairo for Upper Egypt in the group led by Pierre Girard. He returns from the expedition with many drawings.
- 29 April – The Royal Academy Exhibition of 1799 opens at Somerset House in London
- 18 August – The Salon of 1799 opens at the Louvre in Paris
- James Barry becomes the first and (for 200 years) only member to be expelled from the British Royal Society of Arts, soon after the appearance of his belligerent Letter to the Dilettanti Society.
- Caspar David Friedrich suffers his first depressive interlude.
- Pierre-Henri de Valenciennes publishes Éléments de perspective pratique: à l'usage des artistes, suivis de réflexions et conseils à un élève sur la peinture, et particulièrement sur le genre du paysage (Elements of practical perspective, for the use of artists; followed by reflections and advice to a student on painting, particularly on the genre of landscape).

== Works ==
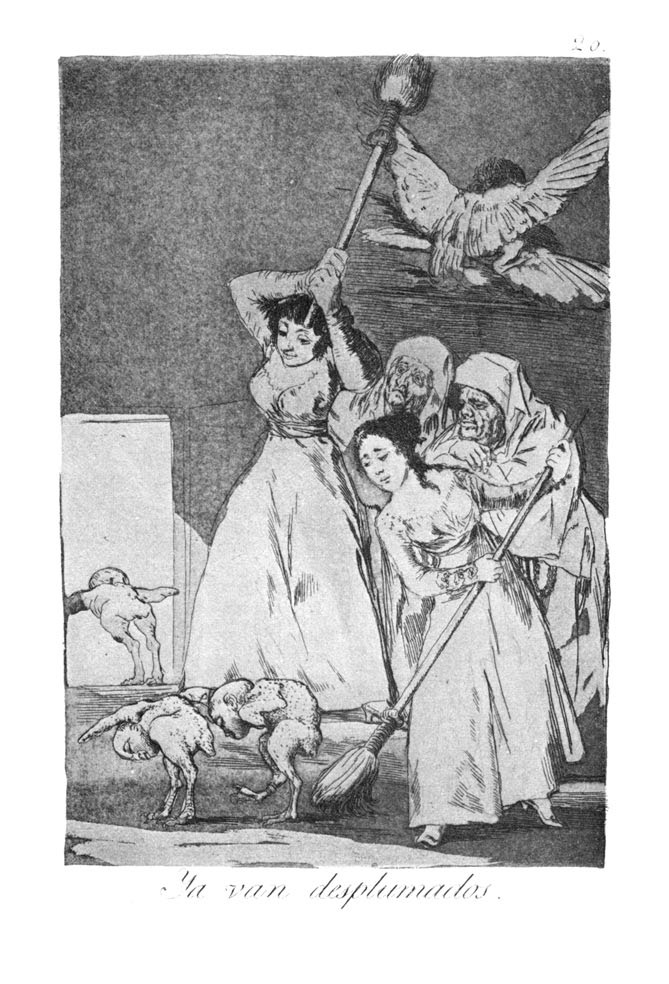
Francisco Goya, Ya van desplumados ("And so they go away featherless"), print 20 in Los Caprichos

- Lemuel Francis Abbott – Portrait of Horatio Nelson
- William Beechey – Portrait of John Philip Kemble
- Féréol Bonnemaison – Young Woman Overtaken by a Storm
- John Singleton Copley – The Battle of Camperdown
- Jacques-Louis David
  - The Intervention of the Sabine Women
  - Portrait of Henriette de Verninac
- Anne-Louis Girodet de Roussy-Trioson – Mademoiselle Lange as Danaë
- Francisco Goya
  - Los Caprichos
  - Charles IV in his Hunting Clothes
- Pierre-Narcisse Guérin – The Return of Marcus Sextus
- Philip James de Loutherbourg
  - The Battle of Camperdown
  - A Distant Hail-Storm Coming On
- George Morland – Selling Fish
- Ramsay Richard Reinagle – Portrait of John Constable
- J. M. W. Turner
  - Harlech Castle from Tygwyn Ferry
  - Norham Castle
- Johann Zoffany – Dido and Lady Elizabeth Murray

== Births ==
- January 7 – Eduard Magnus, German painter (died 1872)
- January 18 – Valentine Bartholomew, English flower painter (died 1879)
- January 31 – Rodolphe Töpffer, Swiss caricaturist (died 1846)
- February 14 – Walenty Wańkowicz, Belarusian-Polish painter (died 1842)
- February 27 – Frederick Catherwood, English artist and architect (died 1854)
- March 30 – Berndt Godenhjelm, Finnish painter (died 1881)
- May 26 – August Kopisch, German poet and painter (died 1853)
- June 10 – Fyodor Bruni, Russian painter of Italian descent (died 1875)
- August 12 – Patrick MacDowell, Irish sculptor from Belfast (died 1870)
- September 20 – Edward Calvert, English printmaker and painter (died 1883)
- October 30 – Emil Bærentzen, Danish portrait painter and lithographer (died 1868)
- December 12 – Karl Briullov, Russian painter who transitioned from the Russian Neoclassicism to Romanticism (died 1852)
- date unknown
  - Henri Decaisne, Belgian historical and portrait painter (died 1852)
  - Eduard Clemens Fechner, German portrait painter and etcher (died 1861)
  - William Simson, Scottish-born painter (died 1847)

== Deaths ==
- February 1 – Ferdinand Kobell, German painter and engraver (born 1740)
- February 9 – Johann Baptist Babel, Swiss sculptor (born 1716)
- February 14 – Luis Paret y Alcázar – Spanish painter of the late-Baroque or Rococo period (born 1746)
- March 18 – Adam Friedrich Oeser, German etcher, painter and sculptor (born 1717)
- June 1 – James Tassie, Scottish engraver (born 1735)
- August 3 – Hendrik Kobell, Dutch landscape and marine painter, etcher, draftsman and watercolorist (born 1751)
- August 4 – John Bacon, English sculptor (born 1740)
- November 30 – Guillaume Voiriot, French portrait painter (born 1713)
- December 8 – Giuseppe Cades, Italian sculptor, painter and engraver (born 1750)
- December 9 – Bartolomeo Cavaceppi, Italian sculptor (born 1716)
- December 14 – Johann Balzer, Czech etcher and engraver (born 1738)
- date unknown
  - William Baillie, British artist working in India (born 1752/1753)
  - Gabriele Bella, Italian Baroque painter (born 1730)
  - Jacques-Louis Copia, French engraver (born 1764)
  - Luo Ping, Chinese Qing dynasty painter, one of the Eight Eccentrics of Yangzhou (born 1733)
  - Marten Waefelaerts, Flemish landscape painter (born 1748)
