= The Battle of the Nile (painting) =

Painting by Philip James de Loutherbourg

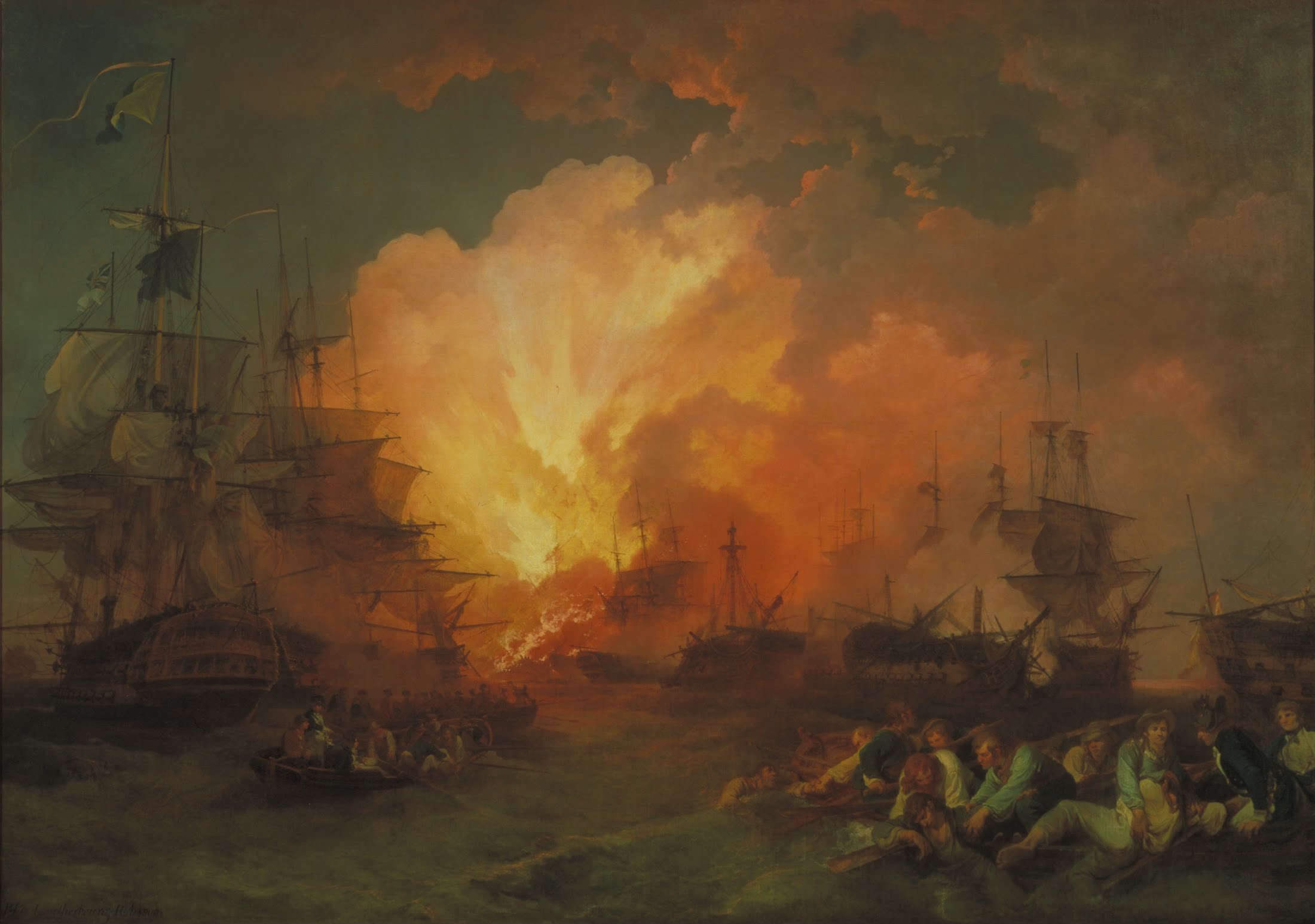
- Artist: Philip James de Loutherbourg
- Year: 1800
- Type: Oil on canvas, history painting
- Dimensions: 152.4 cm × 214 cm (60.0 in × 84 in)
- Location: Tate Britain, London

The Battle of the Nile is an oil on canvas history painting by the French-born British artist Philip James de Loutherbourg, from 1800.

== History and description ==
It depicts the Battle of the Nile on the 1 August 1798 during the French Revolutionary Wars. The battle, fought in Aboukir Bay near the Nile Delta, was a major victory for Britain's Royal Navy under Horatio Nelson over the French Republic. This had the effect of stranding the army of Napoleon Bonaparte which had recently launched an invasion of Egypt. Loutherbourg's painting shows the moment the French flagship L'Orient blew up. Nelson's own flagship HMS Vanguard is in the left foreground while the French Line of battle is to the right. The English artist Turner also produced a now-lost painting showing the scene which he submitted to the Royal Academy's Summer Exhibition of 1799.

Aside from his romantic landscapes, Loutherbourg also produced a number of battle paintings. The previous year he had produced a companion piece The Battle of Camperdown portraying a recent victory over the Dutch. Today his painting of the Battle of the Nile is in the collection of the Tate Britain, having been purchased in 1971.

== See also ==
- Marine art

== Bibliography ==
- Rodger, Alexander Bankier. The War of the Second Coalition: 1798 to 1801, a Strategic Commentary. Clarendon Press, 1964.
- Tracy, Nicholas. Britannia’s Palette: The Arts of Naval Victory. McGill-Queen's Press, 2007.
