= Kilgarren Castle =

Painting by J. M. W. Turner

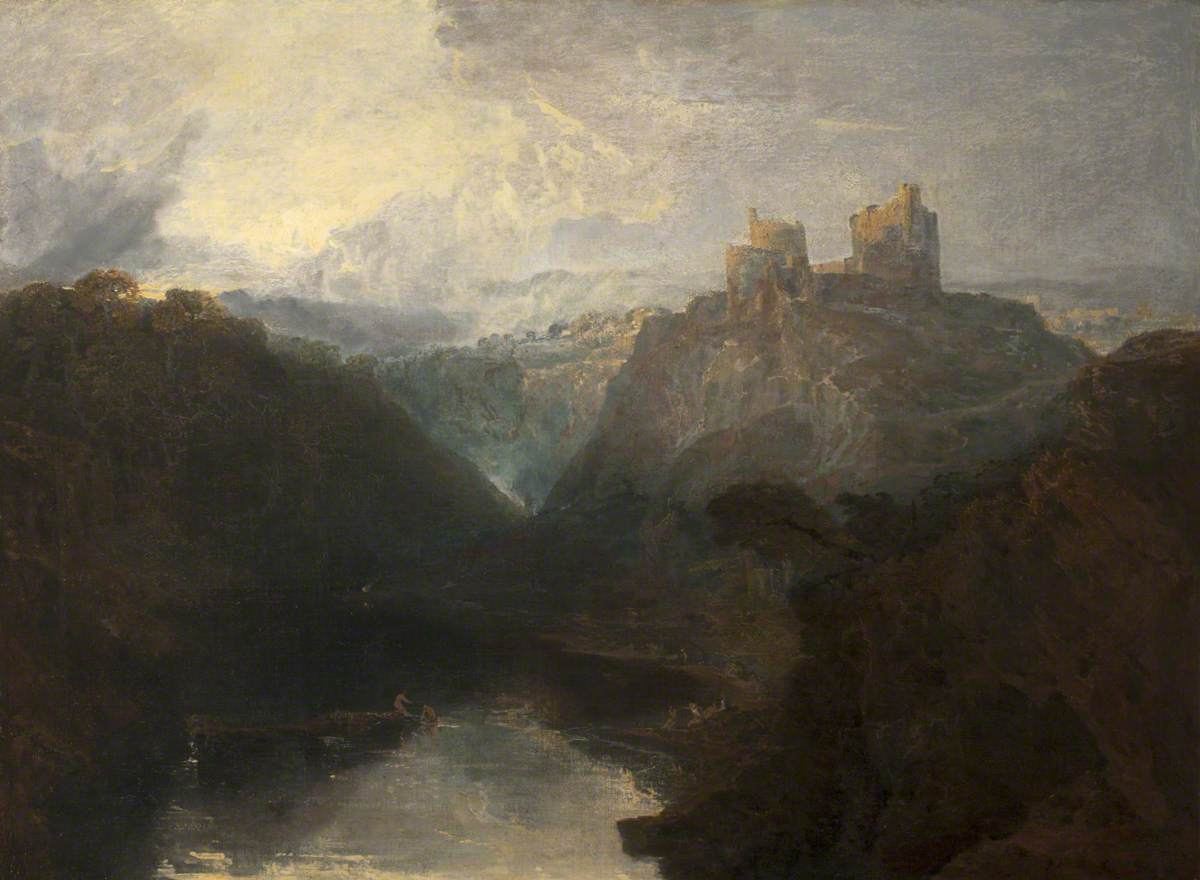
- Artist: J. M. W. Turner
- Year: 1798
- Type: Oil on canvas, landscape painting
- Dimensions: 89 cm × 119.7 cm (35 in × 47.1 in)
- Location: Cragside, Northumberland

Kilgarren Castle is a 1798 landscape painting by the British artist J.M.W. Turner. It features a view of Cilgerran Castle, the remains of a prominent fortress established by Normans in Pembrokeshire in the west of Wales. The picture was produced early in Turner's career. He toured Great Britain and his works often featured ancient castles and rugged landscapes, a common theme of the emerging Romantic movement. This was produced in his London studio following a tour of Wales in spring 1798.

The painting, which also features the River Teifi, was displayed at the Royal Academy Exhibition of 1799 held at Somerset House in London. It was once owned by the celebrated Regency art collector Sir John Leicester. It is now hanging at Cragside in Northumberland in the care of the National Trust.

== See also ==
- List of paintings by J. M. W. Turner

== Bibliography ==
- Bailey, Anthony. J.M.W. Turner: Standing in the Sun. Tate Enterprises, 2013.
- Cannon-Brookes, Peter. Paintings from Tabley. Heim, 1989.
- Hamilton, James. Turner - A Life. Sceptre, 1998.
- Hawes, Louis. Ruins in British Romantic Art from Wilson to Turner. Nottingham Castle Museum, 1988.
