= Jean-Jacques Castex =

French sculptor (1731 – 1822)

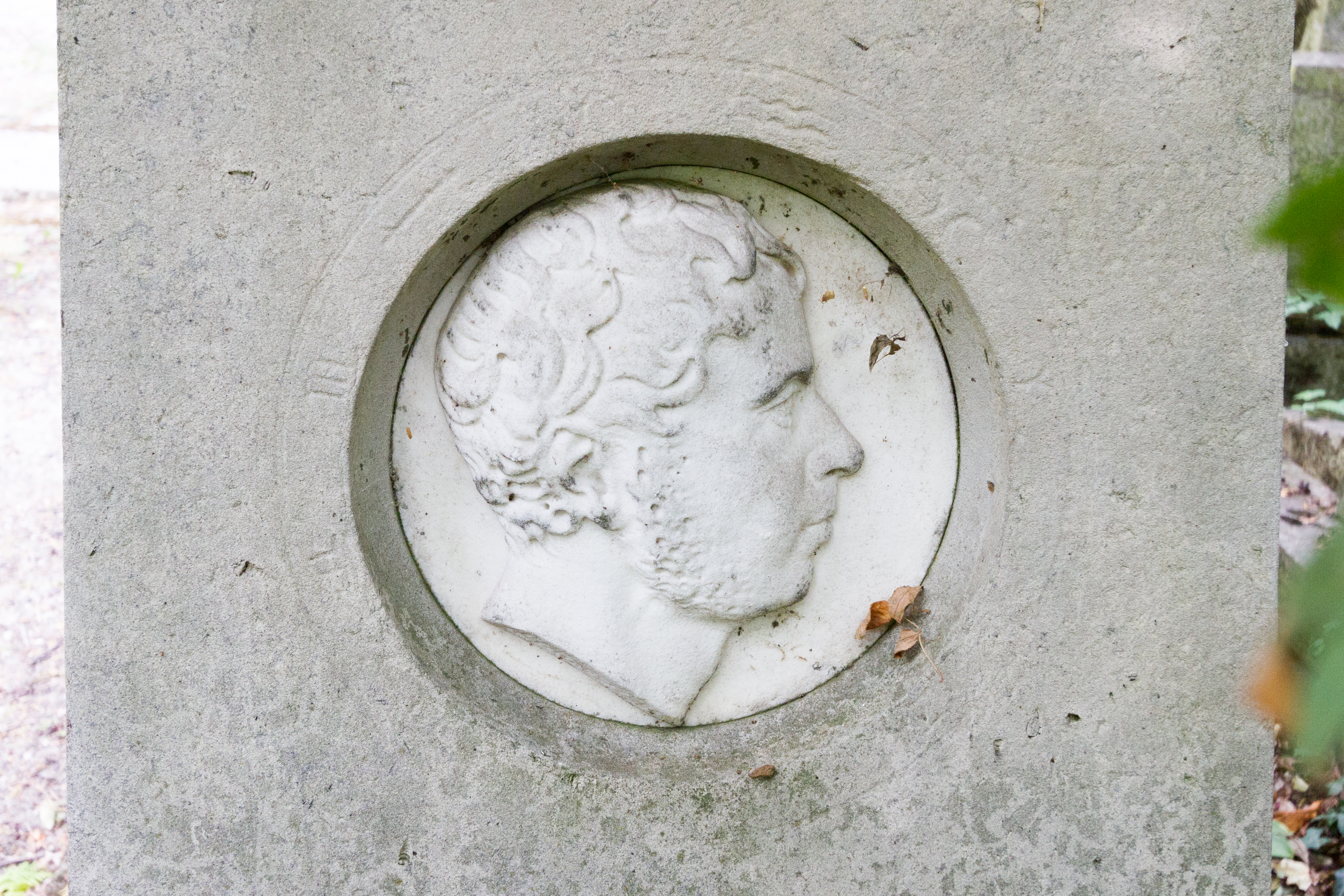
Père-Lachaise - Division 11 - Castex 03.jpg

Jean-Jacques Castex (9 April 1731 – 1822) was a French sculptor.

Castex was born in Toulouse. He participated in the Napoleonic Campaign in Egypt. In January 1799, he accompanied the geographer Bertre in his travel to Fayoum. He was part of the committee led by Pierre Girard which left Cairo on 19 March 1799 to go to Upper Egypt. He made a wax model, reduced to one third, of the Dendera zodiac. He created, after the drawings he had brought back from Egypt, a Zodiaque, which was exhibited at the Salon of 1819 in Paris. He remains famous for having carved an inscription on the stone of the great temple of Philae. Despite his talent, he died in poverty at the Hôtel-Dieu de Paris.
