= Portrait of Thomas Hope =

Painting by William Beechey

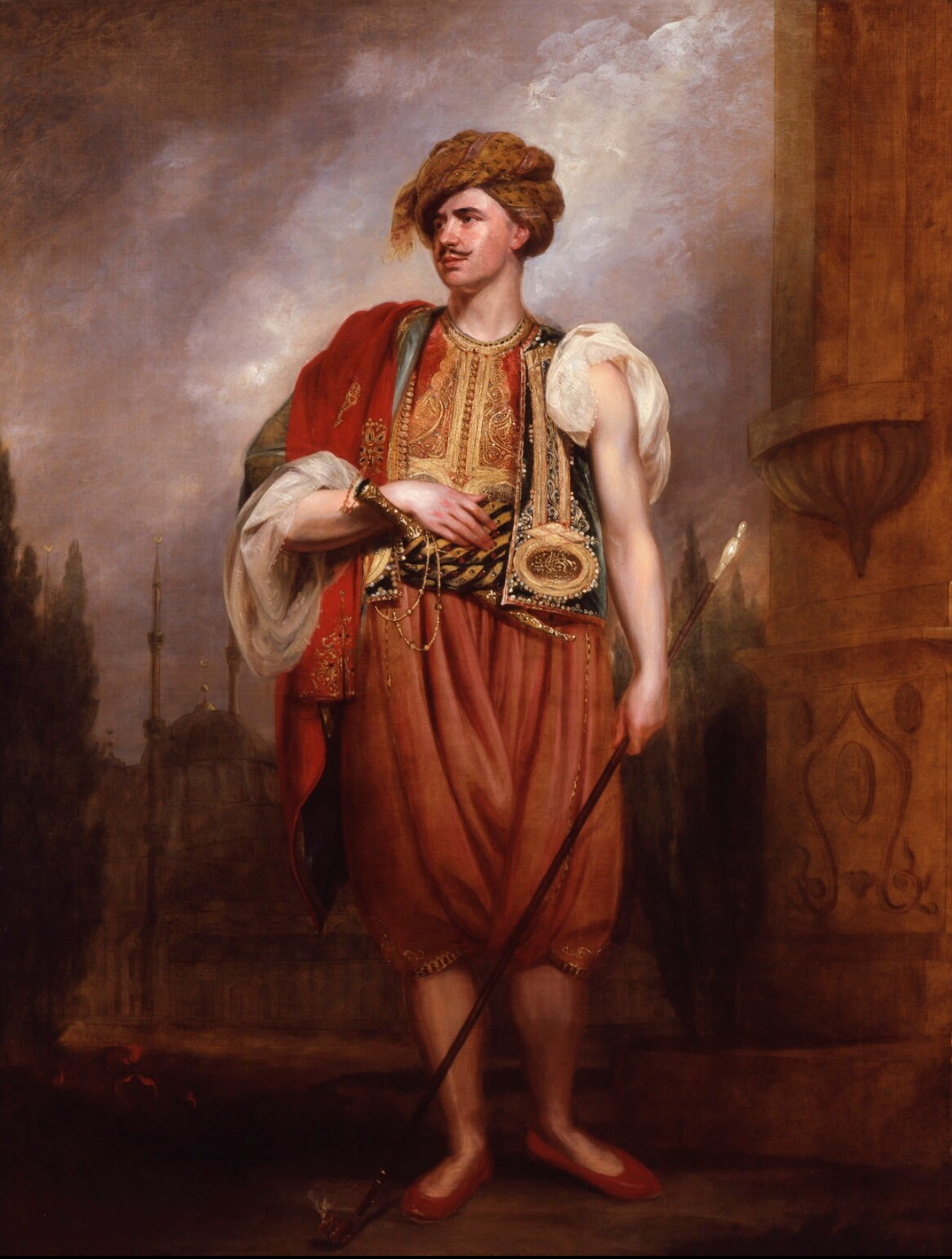
- Artist: William Beechey
- Year: 1798
- Type: Oil on canvas, portrait painting
- Dimensions: 221.6 cm × 168.9 cm (87.2 in × 66.5 in)
- Location: National Portrait Gallery, London

Portrait of Thomas Hope is a 1798 portrait painting by the British artist William Beechey. It depicts the English art collector Thomas Hope. Known for his interest in the exotic and Greek Revival architecture, Hope is shown dressed in Albanian costume. It has been suggested as a possible influence on Lord Byron's choice to have himself painted in Albanian Dress sixteen years later during the Regency era.

Along with Thomas Lawrence, Beechey was one of the most fashionable British portrait painters of the decade. The painting was displayed at the Royal Academy's Summer Exhibition of 1799 at Somerset House. Today it is in the collection of the National Portrait Gallery in London, having been acquired in 1967.

== Bibliography ==
- Egan, Gerald. Fashion and Authorship: Literary Production and Cultural Style from the Eighteenth to the Twenty-First Century. Springer International, 2020.
- Taylor, Lou. Establishing Dress History. Manchester University Press, 2004.
