= Sarah Siddons with the Emblems of Tragedy =

Painting by William Beechey

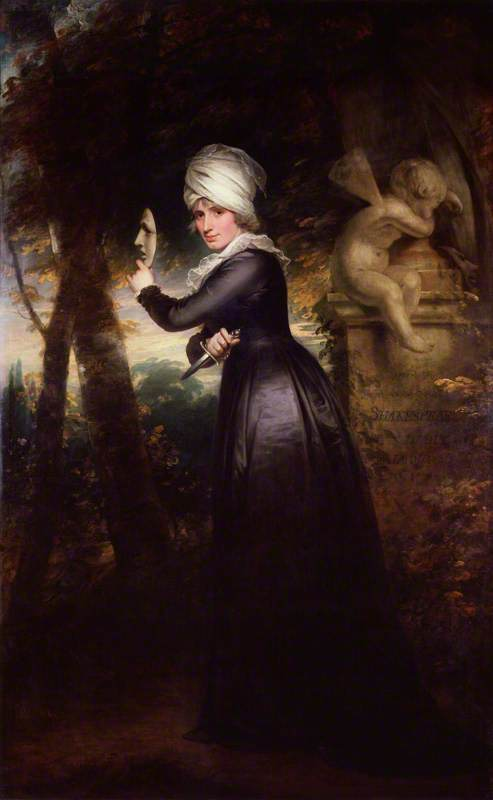
- Artist: William Beechey
- Year: 1793
- Type: Oil on canvas, portrait painting
- Dimensions: 254.6 cm × 153.7 cm (100.2 in × 60.5 in)
- Location: National Portrait Gallery, London

Sarah Siddons with the Emblems of Tragedy is an oil on canvas portrait painting by the British artist William Beechey, from 1793. It portrays Sarah Siddons, the leading stage actress of the era, better known for her roles in tragedy. She is shown holding a mask and a dagger, two symbols of tragedy, while looking at the viewer. The painting may allude to one of her best-known roles, as Shakespeare's Lady Macbeth.

Beechey displayed the work at the Royal Academy's Summer Exhibition of 1794. Today the painting is part of the collection of the National Portrait Gallery, in London, having been acquired in 1977 Beechey also produced a Portrait of John Philip Kemble in 1799 featuring her brother, now in the Dulwich Picture Gallery.

== See also ==
- Sarah Siddons as the Tragic Muse, a 1784 painting by Joshua Reynolds

== Bibliography ==
- Bennett, Shelley, Leonard, Mark & West, Shearer. A Passion for Performance: Sarah Siddons and her Portraitists. Getty Publications, 1999.
- Laurence, Anne, Perry, Gill & Bellamy, Joan. Women, Scholarship and Criticism C. 1790-1900. Manchester University Press, 2000.
