= The Battle of Camperdown =

Painting by John Singleton Copley

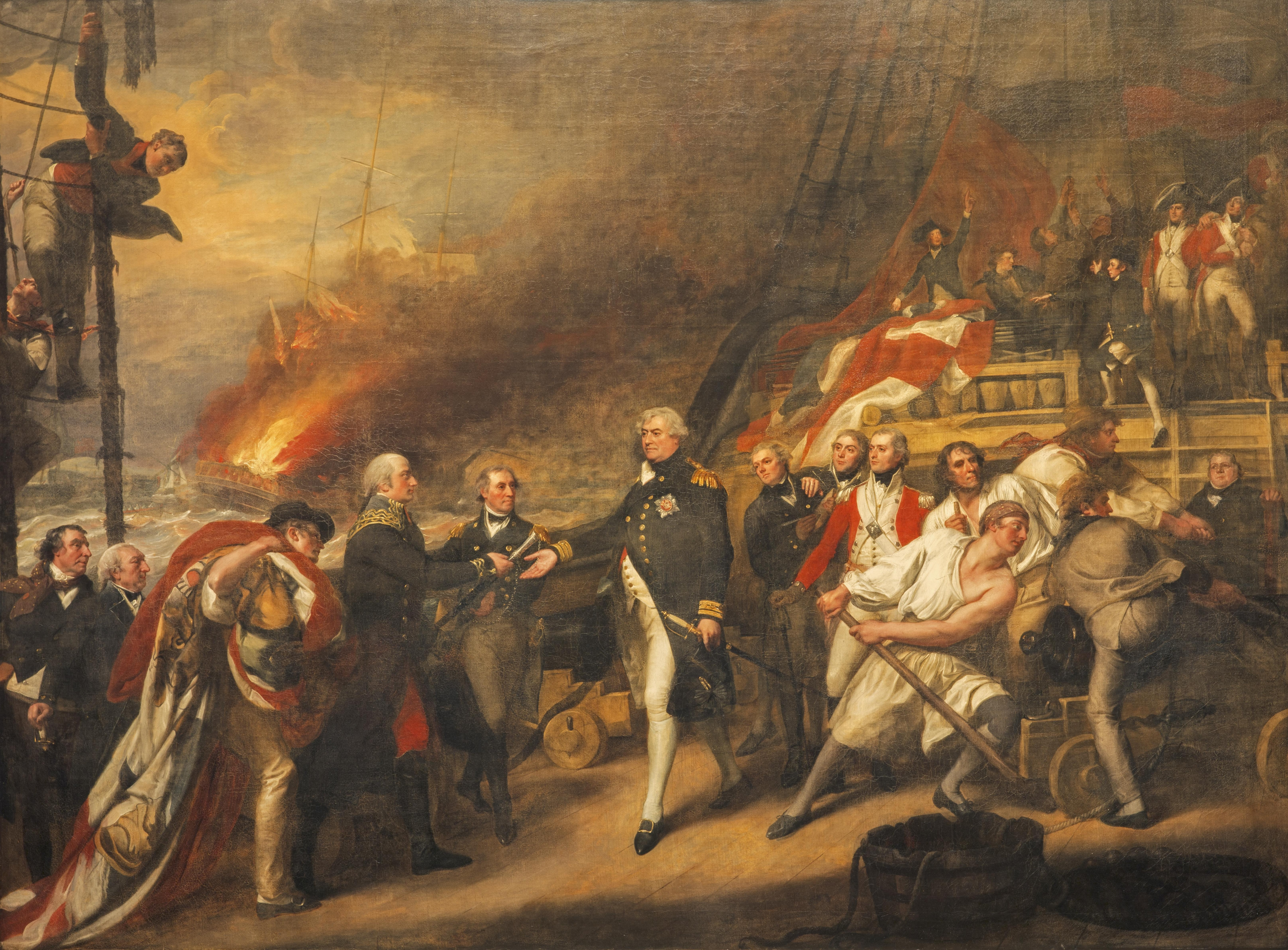
- Artist: John Singleton Copley
- Year: 1799
- Medium: Oil on canvas
- Dimensions: 275 cm × 368.5 cm (108 in × 145.1 in)
- Location: Scottish National Gallery, Edinburgh

The Battle of Camperdown is a 1799 history painting by the American-born painter John Singleton Copley. It depicts the conclusion to the Battle of Camperdown on 11 October 1797, which was fought in the North Sea between fleets of the Royal Navy and the Batavian Navy during the War of the First Coalition. A decisive British victory, Copley's painting shows British Admiral Adam Duncan accepting the surrender of the Batavian Admiral Jan Willem de Winter. Its full title is The Surrender of the Dutch Admiral de Winter to Admiral Duncan at the Battle of Camperdown.

Duncan was hailed as a national hero after Camperdown, and Copley produced the work without being commissioned. Although he hoped to interest John Boydell, an alderman of the City of London, in the work, Copley's relationship with him had been damaged by disputes over his 1791 painting The Defeat of the Floating Batteries at Gibraltar, September 1782 and no agreement was reached. While working on the larger painting, Copley also painted portrait of Duncan which was exhibited at the Royal Academy in 1798.

Copley exhibited the completed painting at Albemarle Street, London around eighteen months after the battle of Camperdown. While it received respectful reviews and was viewed by George III and Charlotte of Mecklenburg-Strelitz, it failed to enjoy the same public success as his earlier paintings. This may partly be to his choosing to depict Duncan over Admiral Horatio Nelson, whose victory at the Battle of the Nile rapidly led him to eclipse Duncan's popularity.

The painting is now in the Scottish National Gallery in Edinburgh. A similar depiction of the battle of Camperdown by Daniel Orme, exhibited two years before Copley's painting, is now in the National Maritime Museum in Greenwich, London.

== Bibliography ==
- Kamensky, Jane. A Revolution in Color: The World of John Singleton Copley. W. W. Norton & Company, 2016.
- Prown, Jules David. John Singleton Copley: In England, 1774–1815. National Gallery of Art, Washington, 1966.
- Tracy, Nicholas. Britannia’s Palette: The Arts of Naval Victory. McGill-Queen's Press, 2007.
