= A Distant Hail-Storm Coming On =

Painting by Philip James de Loutherbourg

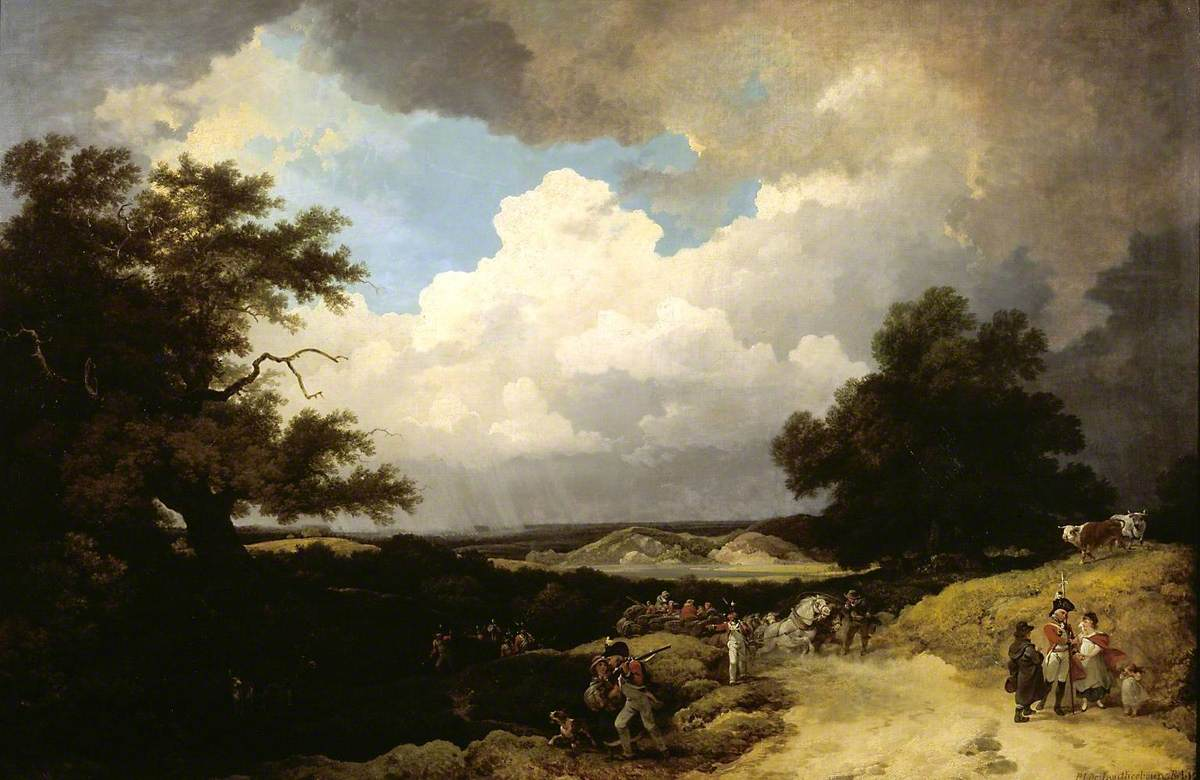
- Artist: Philip James de Loutherbourg
- Year: 1799
- Type: Oil on canvas, landscape painting
- Dimensions: 109 cm × 160 cm (42.9 in × 64 in)
- Location: Tate Britain, London

A Distant Hail-Storm Coming On is a 1799 landscape painting by the French-born British artist Philip James de Loutherbourg. It is also known by the longer title A Distant Hail-Storm Coming On, and the March of Soldiers with their Baggage.

Loutherbourg was an Alsatian painter who had settled in England. He became known for his dynamic landscapes, many of which anticipated the emerging Romantic art movement. This painting shows a group of redcoated British infantry marching through the countryside as a hail storm strikes. Following Britain's entry into the French Revolutionary Wars, Loutherbourg increasingly painted patriotic military scenes featuring British soldiers and sailors. The dark clouds add a sense of foreboding to the landscape. It was exhibited at the Royal Academy Exhibition of 1799 at Somerset House. It is now in the collection of the Tate Britain in Pimlico, having been presented by the Art Fund in 1942.

== Bibliography ==
- Preston, Lillian Elvira. Philippe Jacques de Loutherbourg: Eighteenth Century Romantic Artist and Scene Designer. University of Florida, 1977.
- Russell, Gillian & Ramsey, Neil. Tracing War in British Enlightenment and Romantic Culture. Springer, 2016.
