= Portrait of John Philip Kemble =

Painting by William Beechey

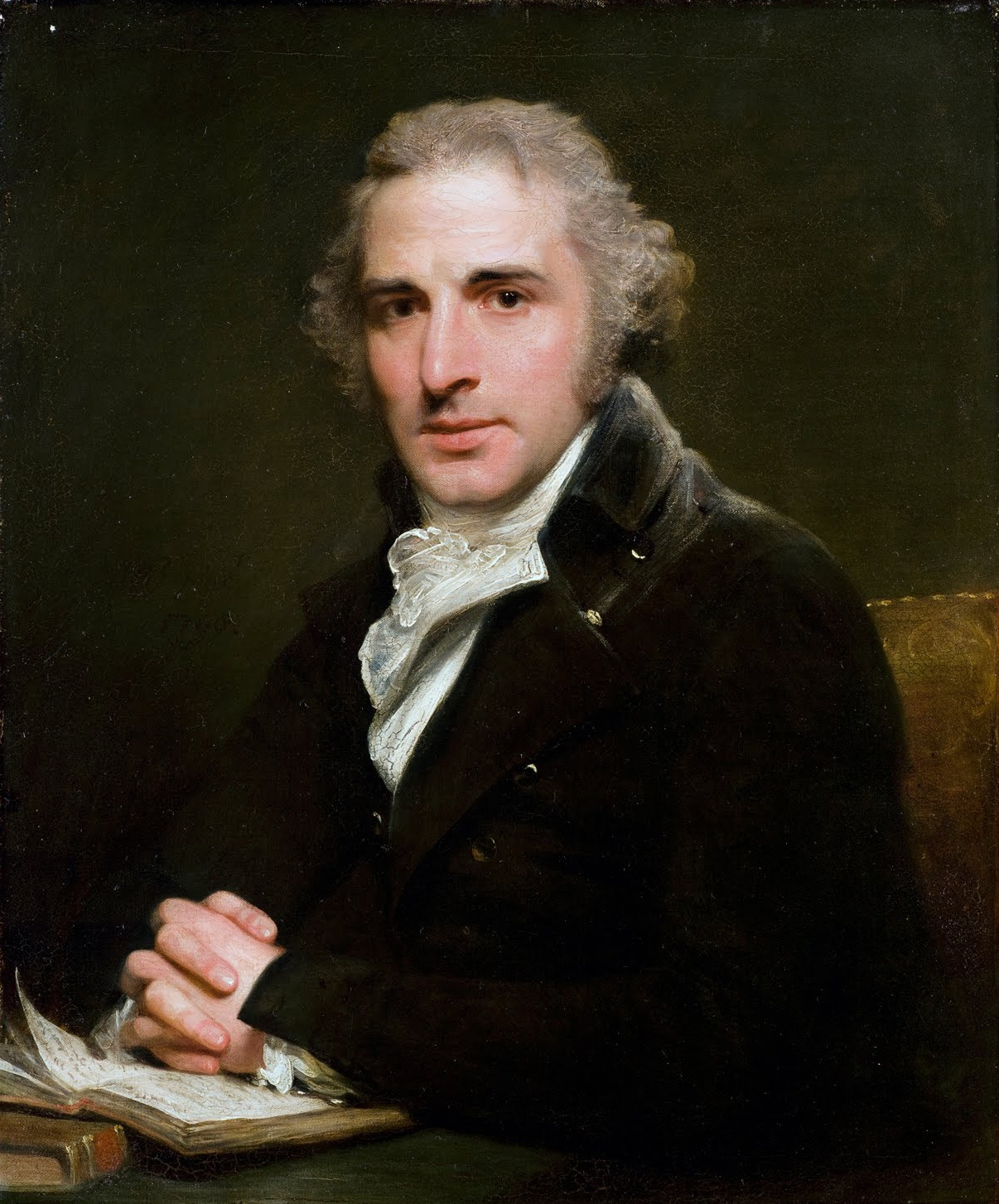
- Artist: William Beechey
- Year: 1799
- Type: Oil on canvas, portrait
- Dimensions: 77.0 cm × 64.1 cm (30.33 in × 25.23 in)
- Location: Dulwich Picture Gallery, London

Portrait of John Philip Kemble is a 1799 portrait painting by the British artist William Beechey depicting the stage actor John Philip Kemble.

Kemble came from a celebrated family of actors and earned fame in London's West End, often appearing alongside his sister Sarah Siddons. He was at the height of his fame when he sat for William Beechey, a leading portraitist and prominent member of the Royal Academy. The painting was commissioned by the French art dealer Noël Desenfans. Unlike most depictions of Kemble which show him in the character of one of the various roles he played, Beechey's portrait depicts the actor as himself. It was exhibited at the Royal Academy Exhibition of 1799 at Somerset House.

The painting is now in the Dulwich Picture Gallery in London having been part of the 1811 bequest by Francis Bourgeois. Kemble was a friend of the founders of the gallery and has reportedly suggested Dulwich to them as a location for the collection.

== See also ==
- Sarah Siddons with the Emblems of Tragedy, a 1793 portrait of his sister by Beechey
- John Philip Kemble as Cato, an 1812 portrait by Thomas Lawrence

== Bibliography ==
- Bennett, Shelley, Leonard, Mark & West, Shearer. A Passion for Performance: Sarah Siddons and her Portraitists. Getty Publications, 1999.
- Ingamells, John. Dulwich Picture Gallery. Unicorn Press, 2008.
- Roberts, Sir William Beechey, R. A.. Duckworth and Company, 1907.
