= The Battle of Camperdown (Loutherbourg) =

Painting by Philip James de Loutherbourg

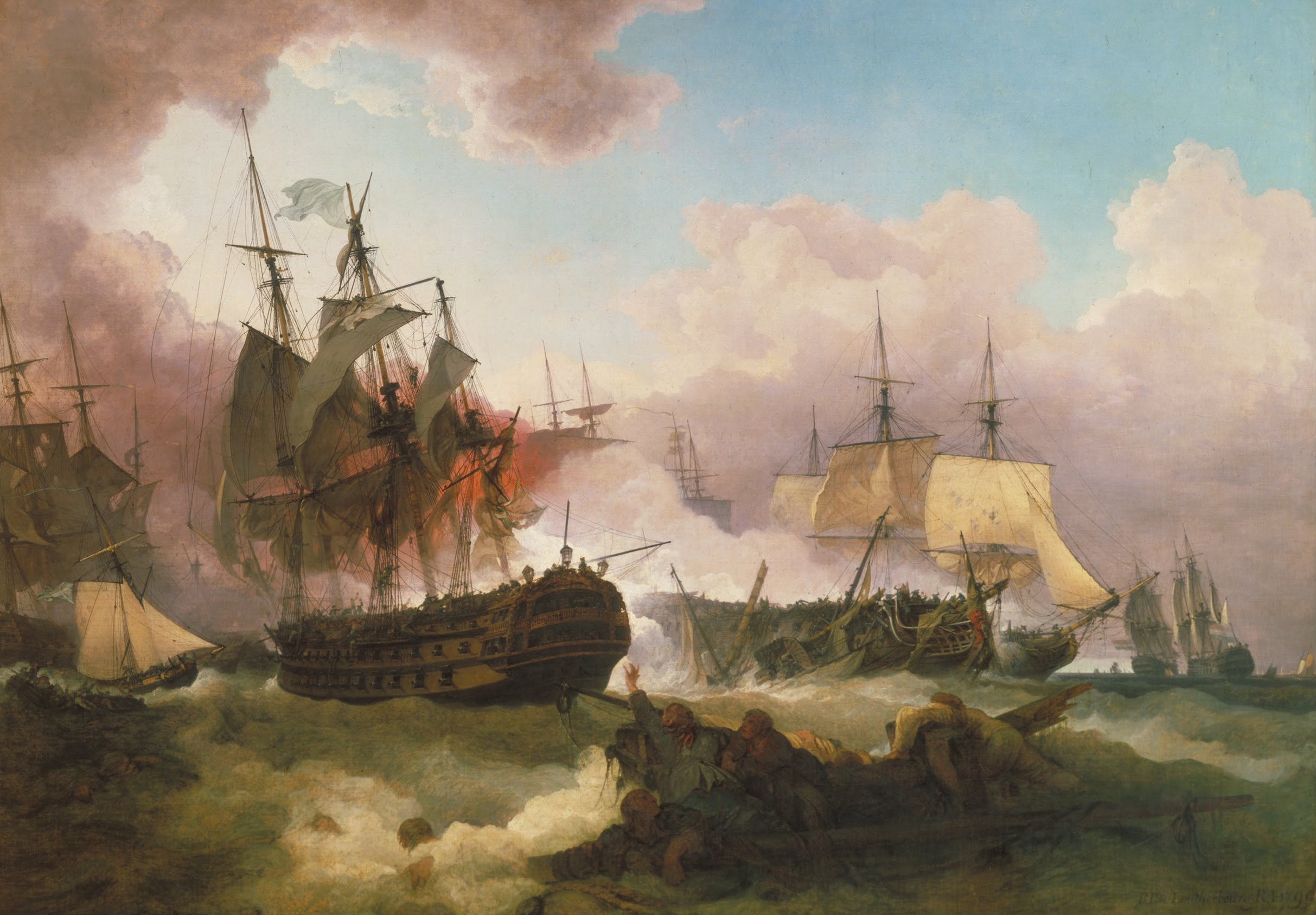
- Artist: Philip James de Loutherbourg
- Year: 1799
- Medium: Oil on canvas
- Dimensions: 152.4 cm × 214 cm (60.0 in × 84 in)
- Location: Tate Britain, London

The Battle of Camperdown is a 1799 history painting by the French-born British artist Philip James de Loutherbourg.

Loutherbourg was known both for his romantic landscapes and his scenes of battles. He produced a companion piece to the work, The Battle of the Nile, the following year, featuring another recent British naval victory. Today both paintings are in the collection of the Tate Britain in London.

== History and description ==
It depicts the naval Battle of Camperdown fought on 11 February 1797 during the French Revolutionary Wars. The battle ended in a victory for the British Royal Navy over a Dutch fleet who were allied to Britain's enemy, France.

In the painting, the British flagship Venerable, the most prominent ship, fires a final broadside at the Dutch ship Vrijheid, which has lost all its masts. Behind the Vrijheid, the masts and sails of another British ship are visible, and beyond and to the right of that ship, two Dutch ships are seen escaping the battle. In the leftmost background, the British cutter Rose can be seen behind an open boat.

From below the cutter Rose towards and in the right foreground, sailors struggle in rough waters to cling desperately to broken spars.

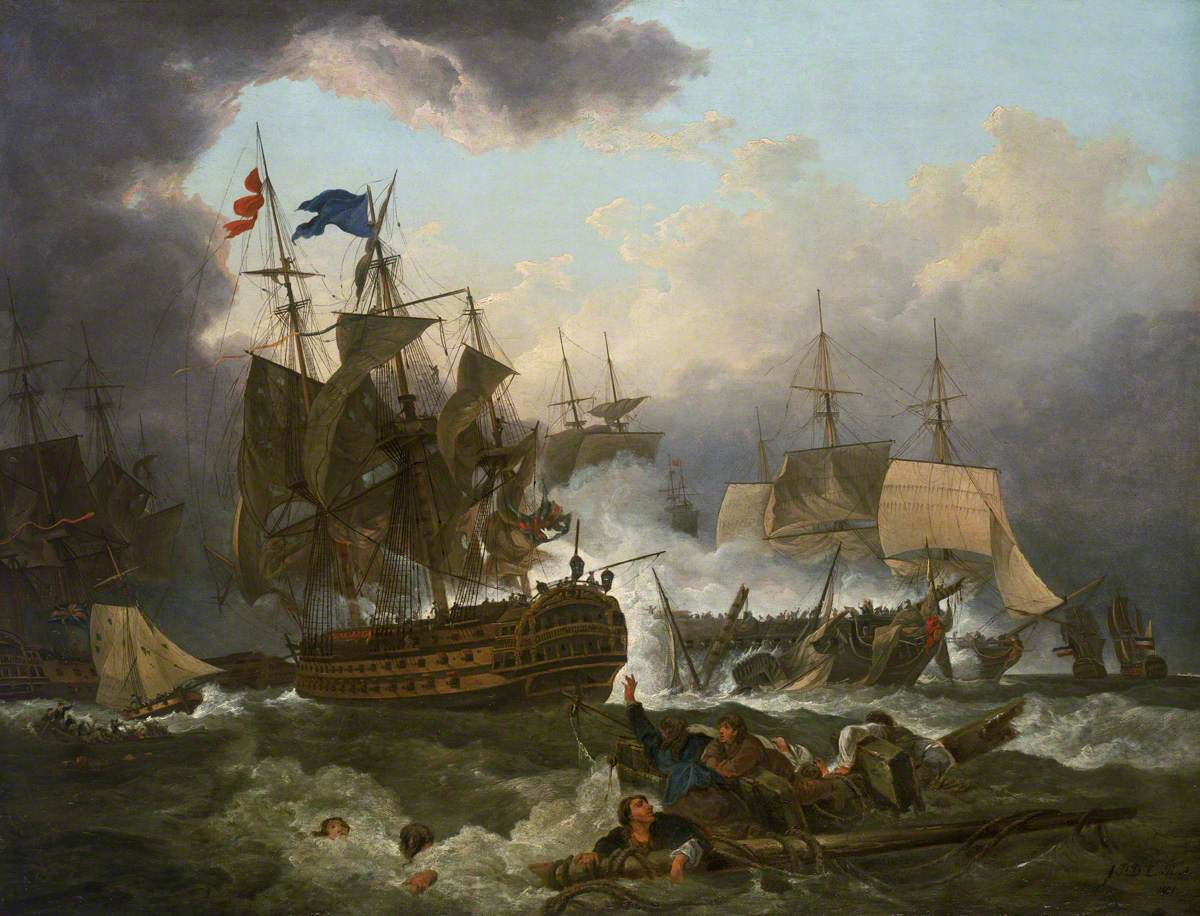
The 1801 version also painted by Loutherbourg.

When viewed in detail, numerous sailors are shown busy on the Venerable, including the sailor, Jack Crawford, climbing the main royal mast which is shown broken at the top.

During the Battle of Camperdown, the Venerable lost part of its mast carrying the admiral's flag. Lowering the Admiral's personal flag always meant surrender, which drove Crawford to heroically climb the mast to raise the admiral's flag in spite of intense gunfire.

== Other versions and derivations ==
Loutherbourg produced several versions of the same subject, one version, dated 1801, is currently in the collection of the National Maritime Museum.

In 1801, James Fittler made and published an engraving of the version at the Tate Gallery.

== Bibliography ==
- Cordingly, David. Marine Painting in England, 1700–1900. 1974.
- Mayoux, Jean Jacques. English Painting: From Hogarth to the Pre-Raphaelites Macmillan, 1985.
- Tracy, Nicholas. Britannia’s Palette: The Arts of Naval Victory. McGill-Queen's Press, 2007.
