= Harlech Castle from Tygwyn Ferry =

Painting by J. M. W. Turner

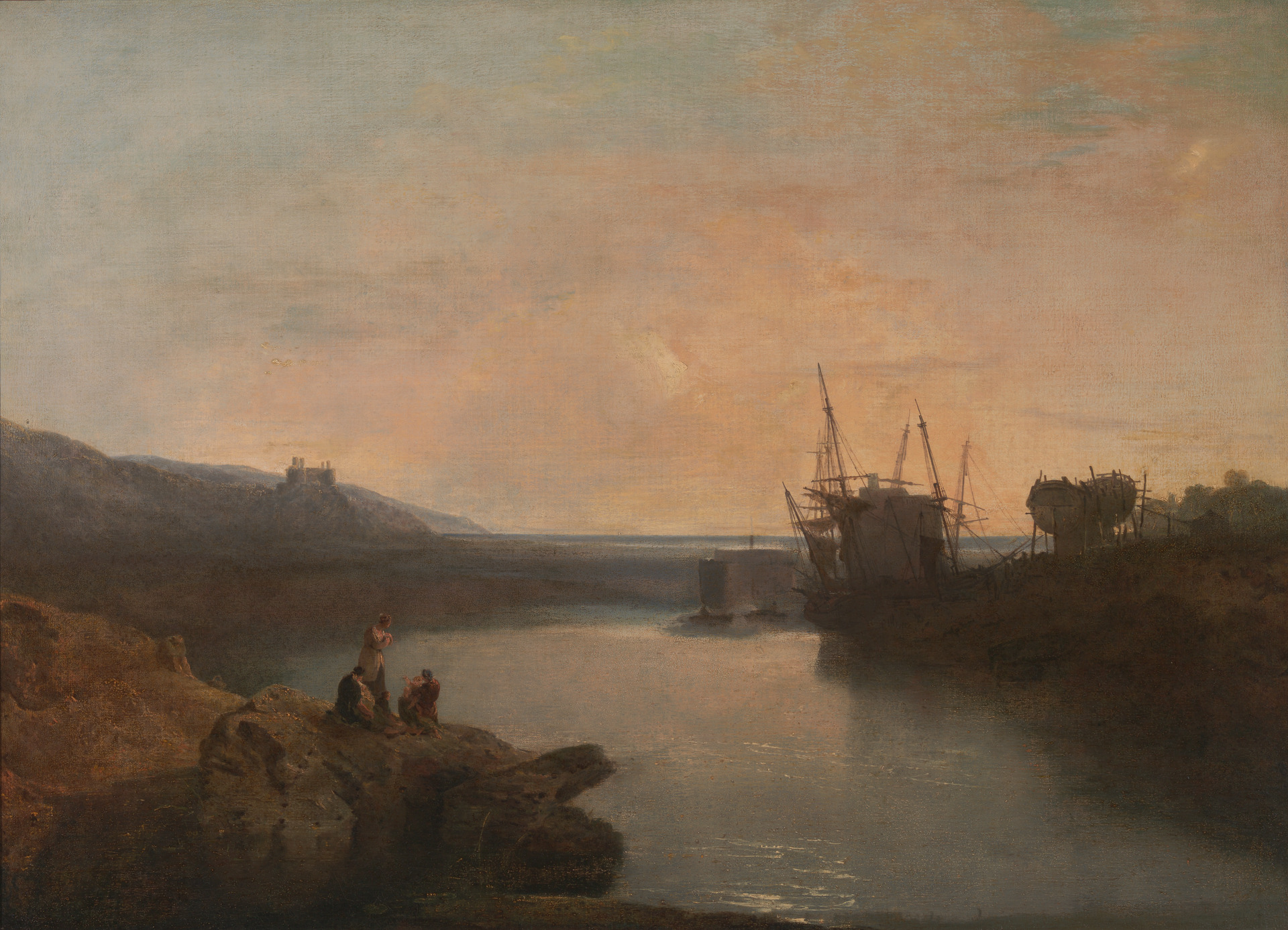
- Artist: J. M. W. Turner
- Year: 1799
- Type: Oil on canvas, landscape painting
- Dimensions: 87 cm × 119.4 cm (34 in × 47.0 in)
- Location: Yale Center for British Art, Connecticut

Harlech Castle from Tygwyn Ferry or Harlech Castle, from Tygwyn Ferry, Summer's Evening Twilight is a 1799 landscape painting by the British artist J.M.W. Turner. It features a view of Harlech Castle from the River Dwyryd near the Tygwyn ferry crossing Unusually Turner chose to place the historic castle, built by Edward I during his Conquest of Wales, in the distance of the composition. And on the right he highlights the more modern local shipbuilding industry.

In 1798 Turner made an extensive tour of Wales and this produced the inspiration of a number of pictures. The painting was displayed at the Royal Academy Exhibition of 1799 held at Somerset House in London. It is now in the Yale Center for British Art as part of the Paul Mellon Collection.

== See also ==
- List of paintings by J. M. W. Turner

== Bibliography ==
- Bailey, Anthony. J.M.W. Turner: Standing in the Sun. Tate Enterprises, 2013.
- Hamilton, James. Turner - A Life. Sceptre, 1998.
- Lord, Peter. Imaging the Nation. University of Wales Press, 2000.
- Solkin, David. Turner and the Masters. Harry N. Abrams, 2009.
