= Royal Academy Exhibition of 1799 =

1799 art exhibition in London

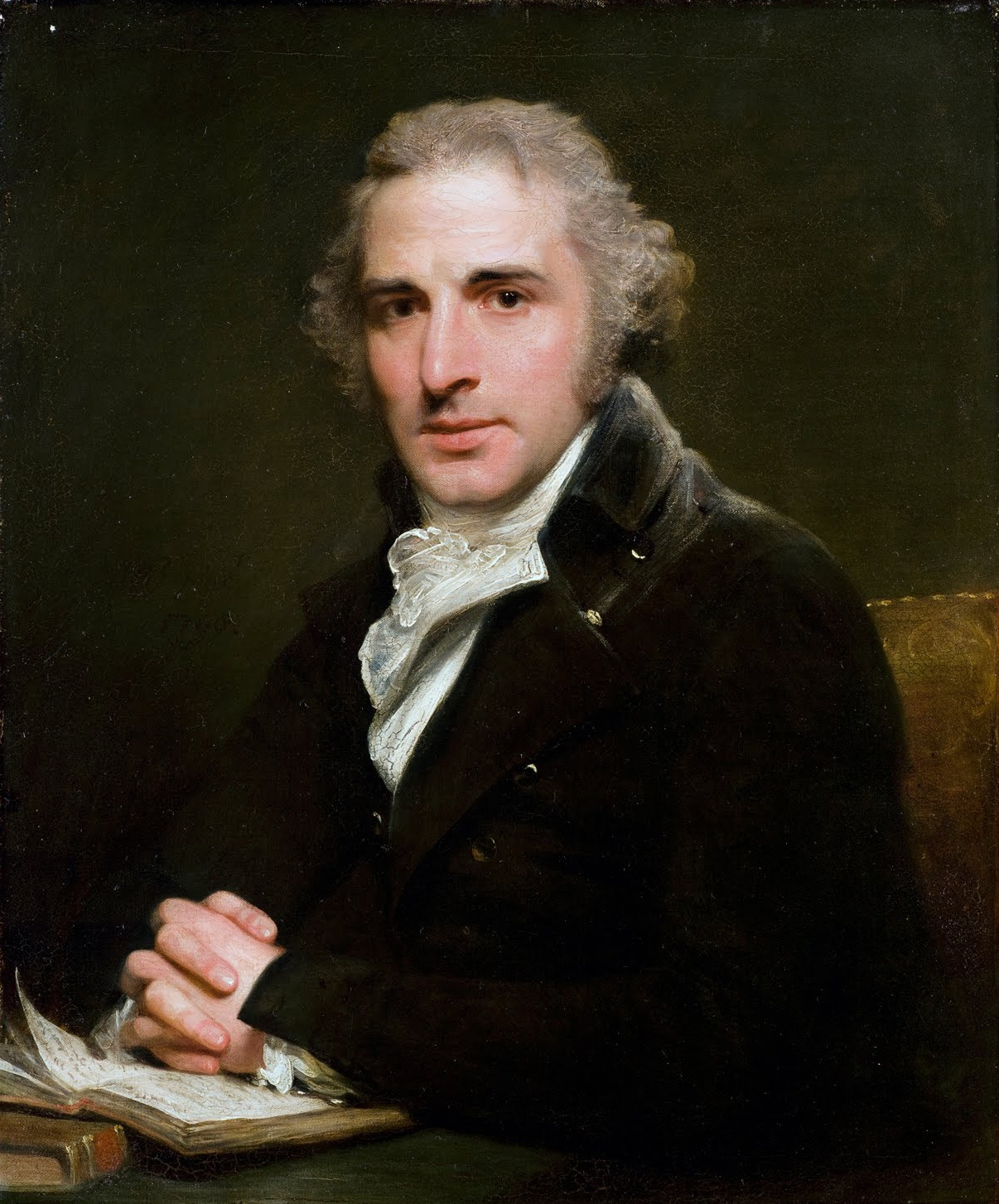
Portrait of John Philip Kemble by William Beechey

The Royal Academy Exhibition of 1799 was an art exhibition held at Somerset House in London between 29 April and 15 June 1799. It was the thirty first annual Summer Exhibition of the British Royal Academy of Arts. Benjamin West presided as President of the Royal Academy. It took place at the height of the French Revolutionary Wars and several works made reference to Horatio Nelson's decisive victory at the Battle of the Nile the previous year. This included J.M.W. Turner's now lost painting depicting the destruction of the Orient during the battle. Turner also showed another lost oil painting Fishermen Becalmed as well as the landcape Harlech Castle from Tygwyn Ferry.

In portraiture Thomas Lawrence exhibited paintings of leading figures of late eighteenth century society as well as the Corsican leader Pasquale Paoli. A rival to Lawrence, William Beechey displayed several notable pictures including the that of the celebrated actor Portrait of John Philip Kemble and Portrait of Thomas Hope featuring a well-known collector. Thomas Girtin's watercolour Beth Kellert, North Wales received particular attention. The veteran animal painter George Stubbs exhibited A Monkey, which strong resembled a canvas he had submitted to the 1775 Exhibition and it is suggested this may have been a deliberate, ironic flouting of the Academy's rules. The Portuguese painter Francisco Vieira exhibited the history scene The Oath of Viriathus, which now only survives as an oil study.

== Gallery ==
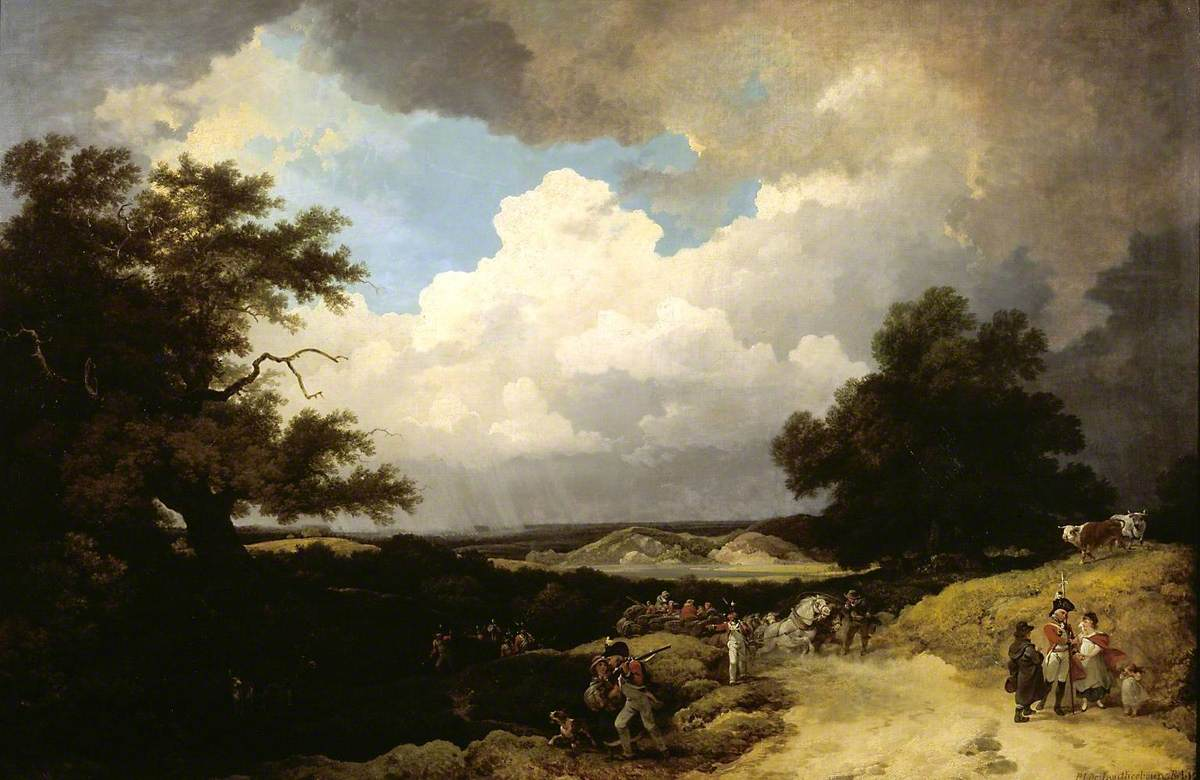
A Distant Hail-Storm Coming On by Loutherbourg

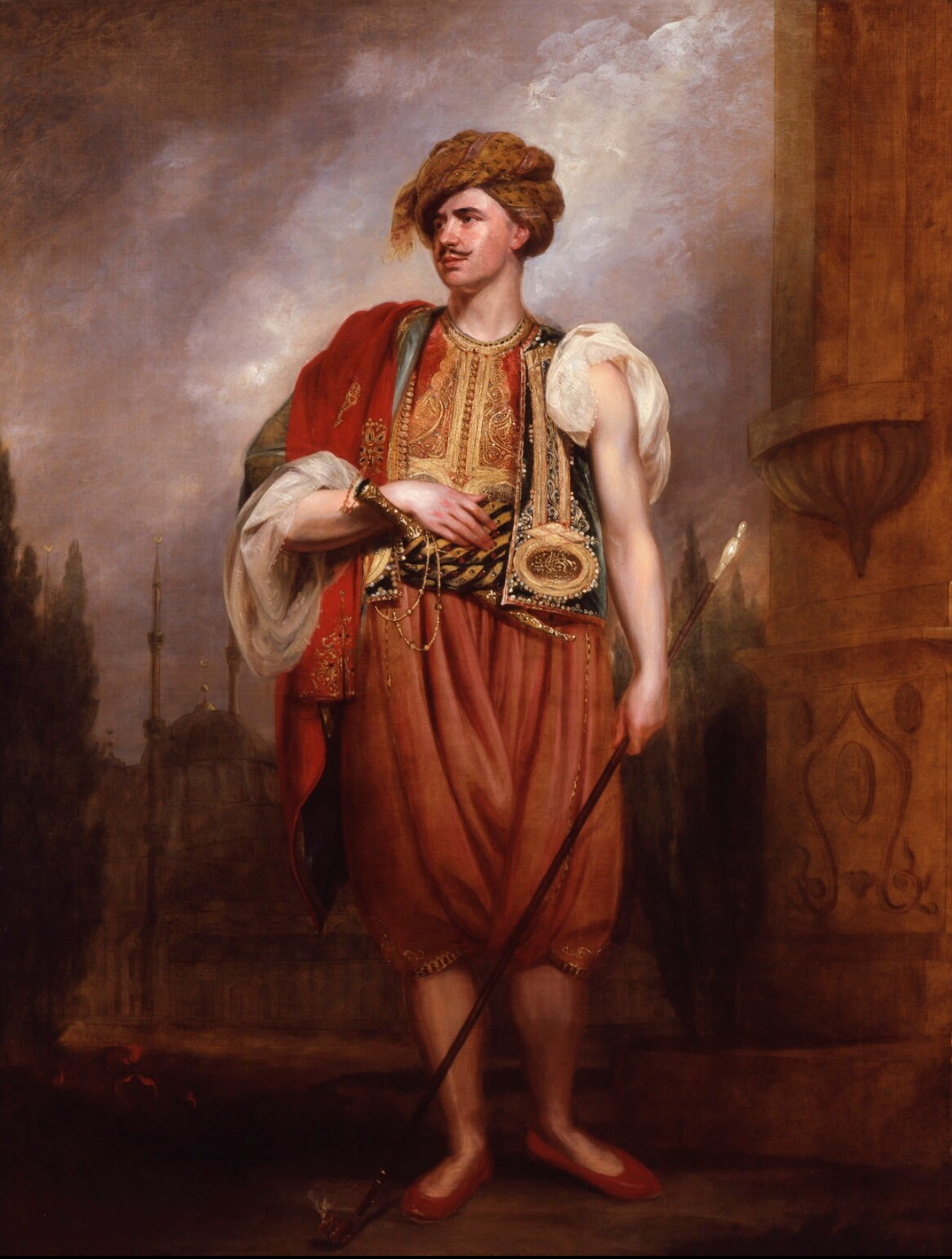
Portrait of Thomas Hope by William Beechey

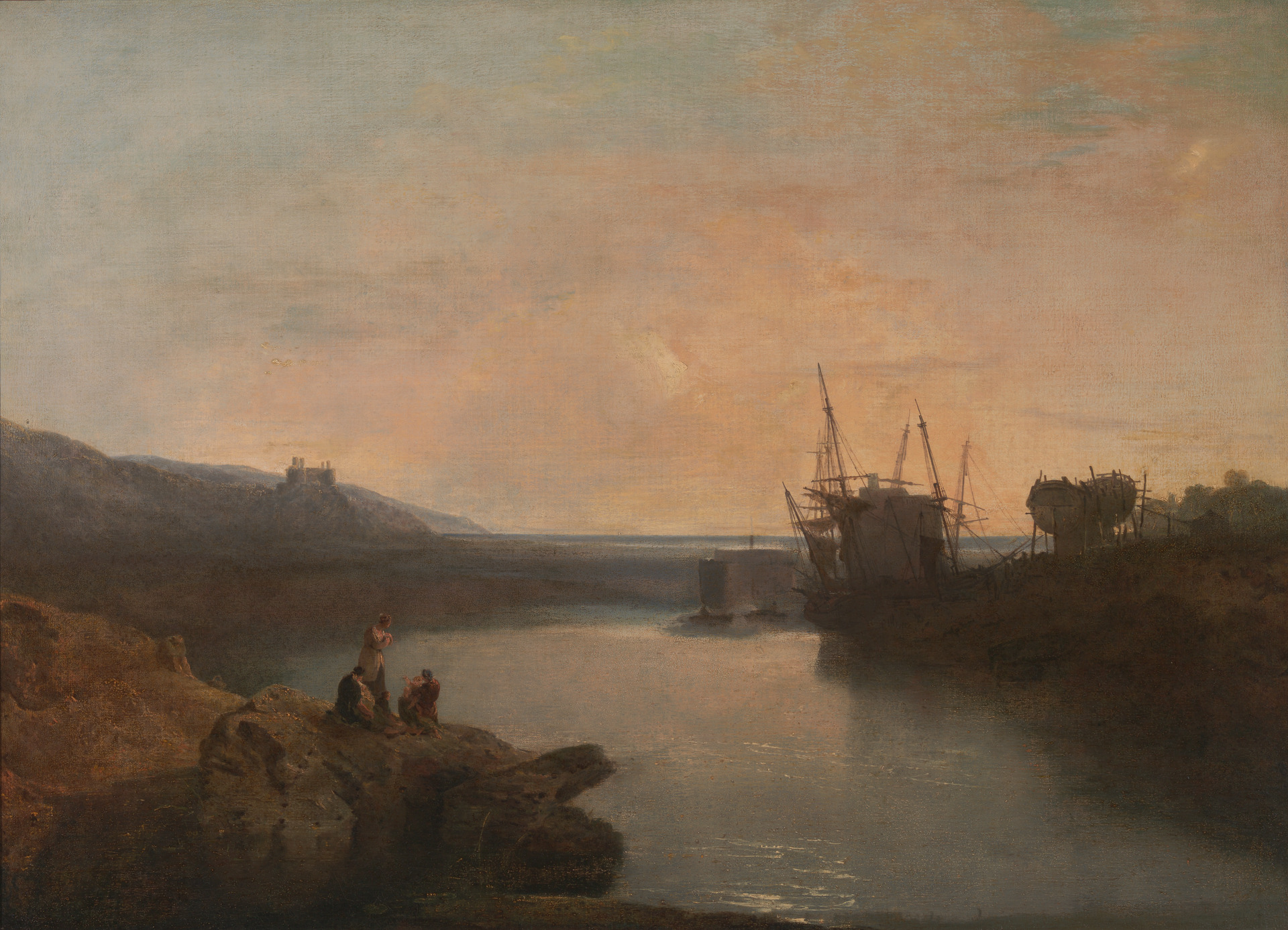
Harlech Castle from Tygwyn Ferry by J.M.W. Turner

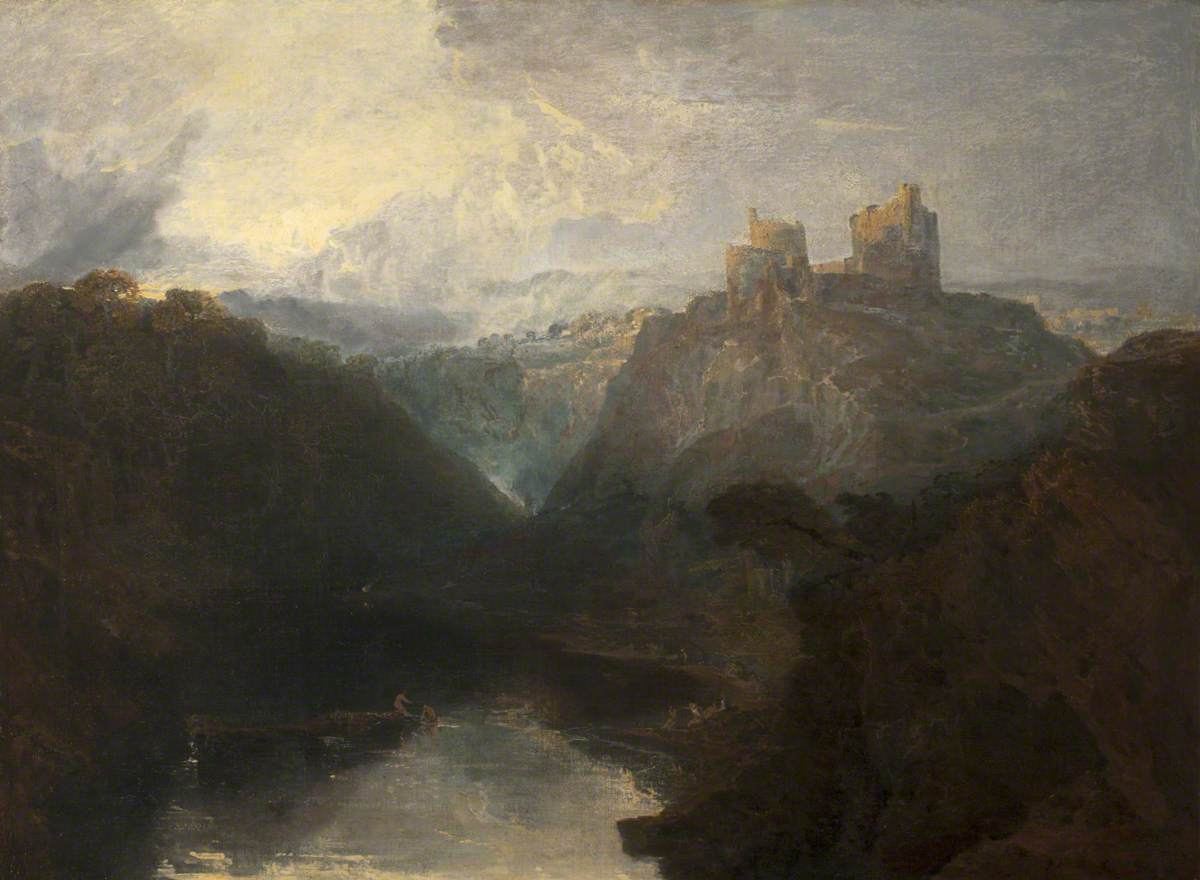
Kilgarren Castle by J.M.W. Turner

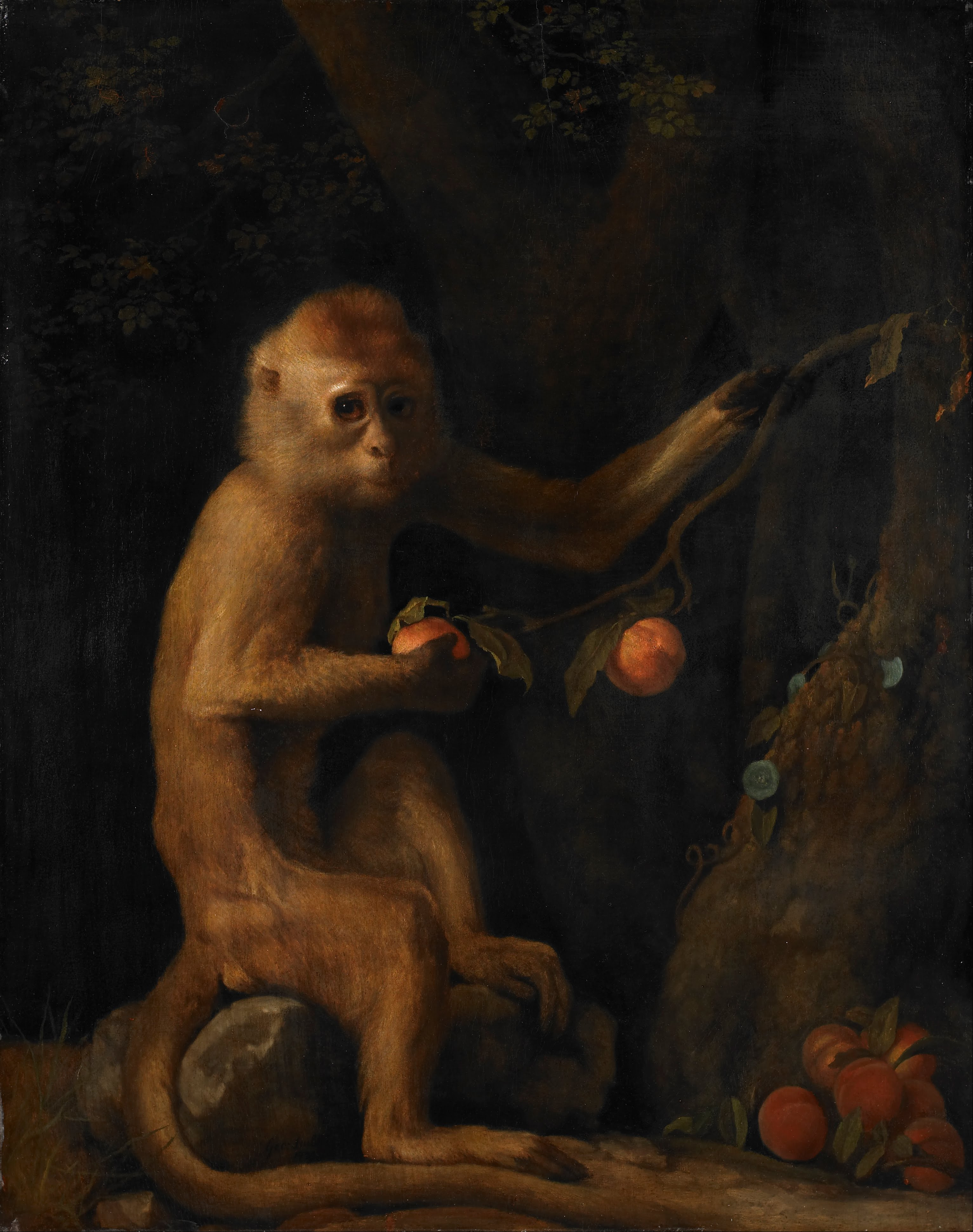
A Monkey by George Stubbs

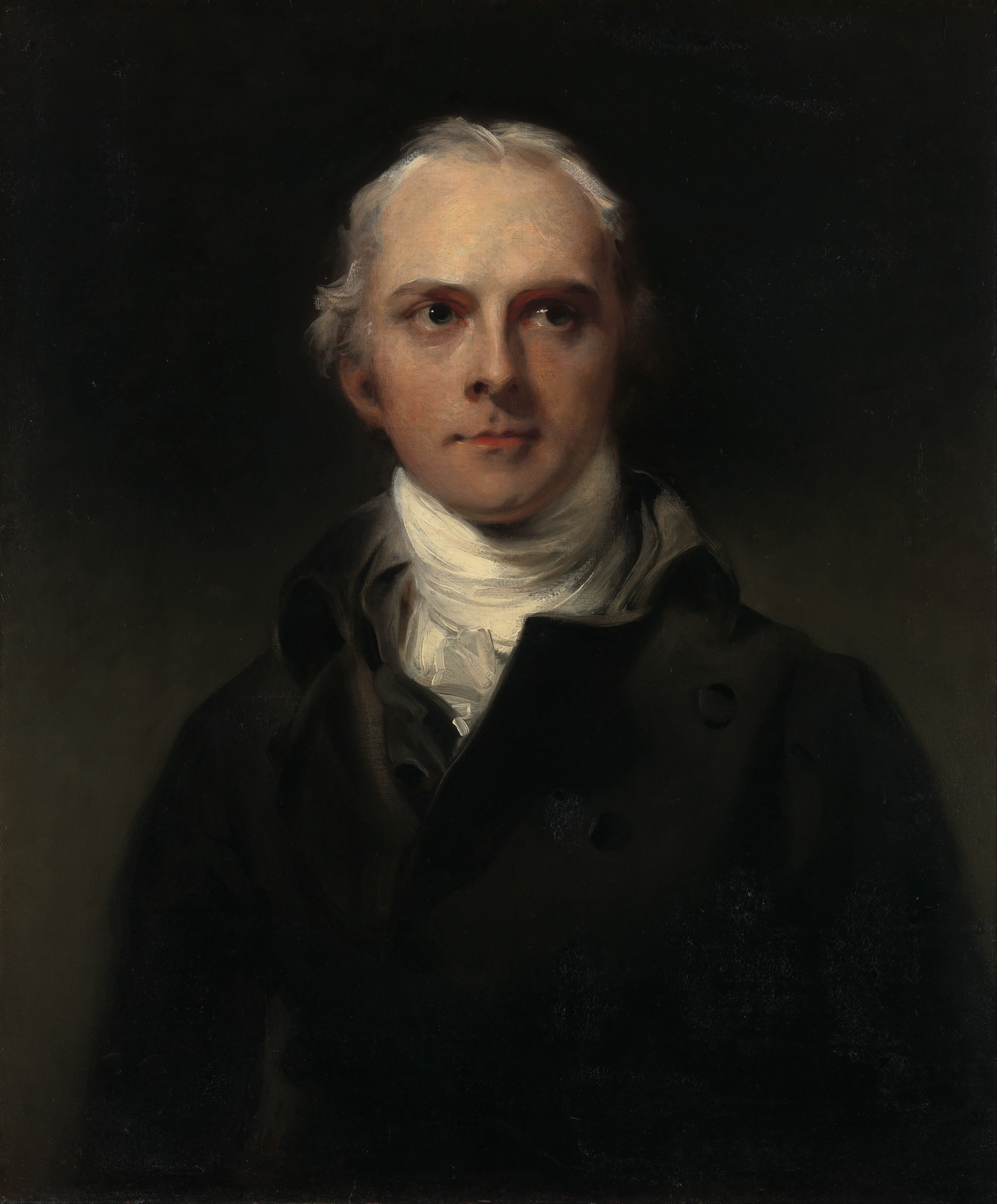
Portrait of Samuel Lysons by Thomas Lawrence

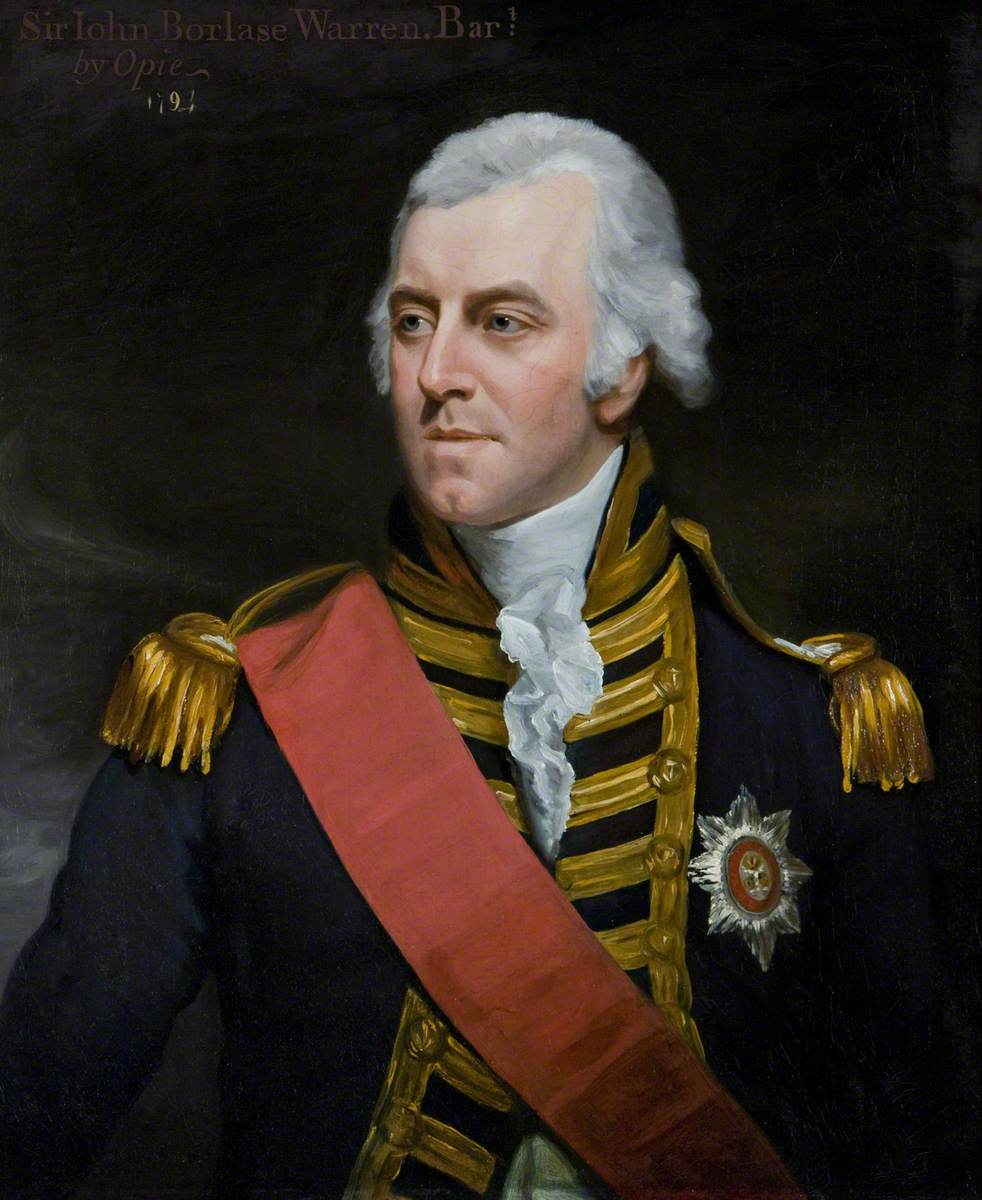
Portrait of John Borlase Warren by John Opie

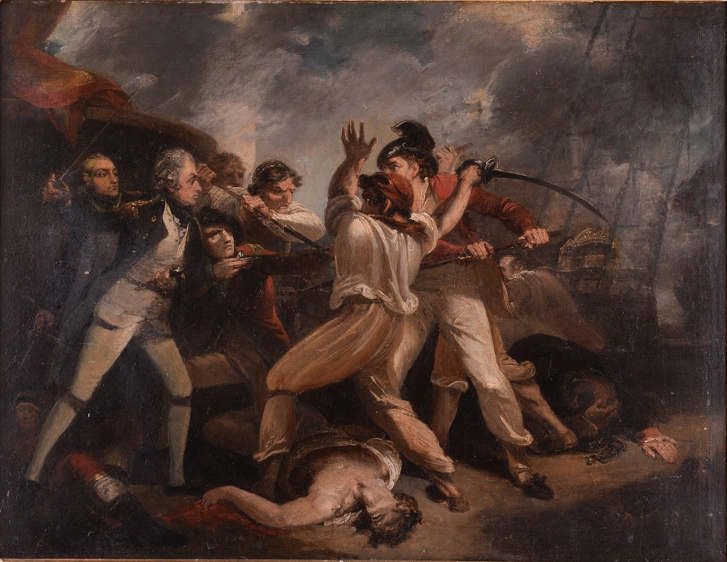
Nelson at Cape St Vincent by Henry Singleton

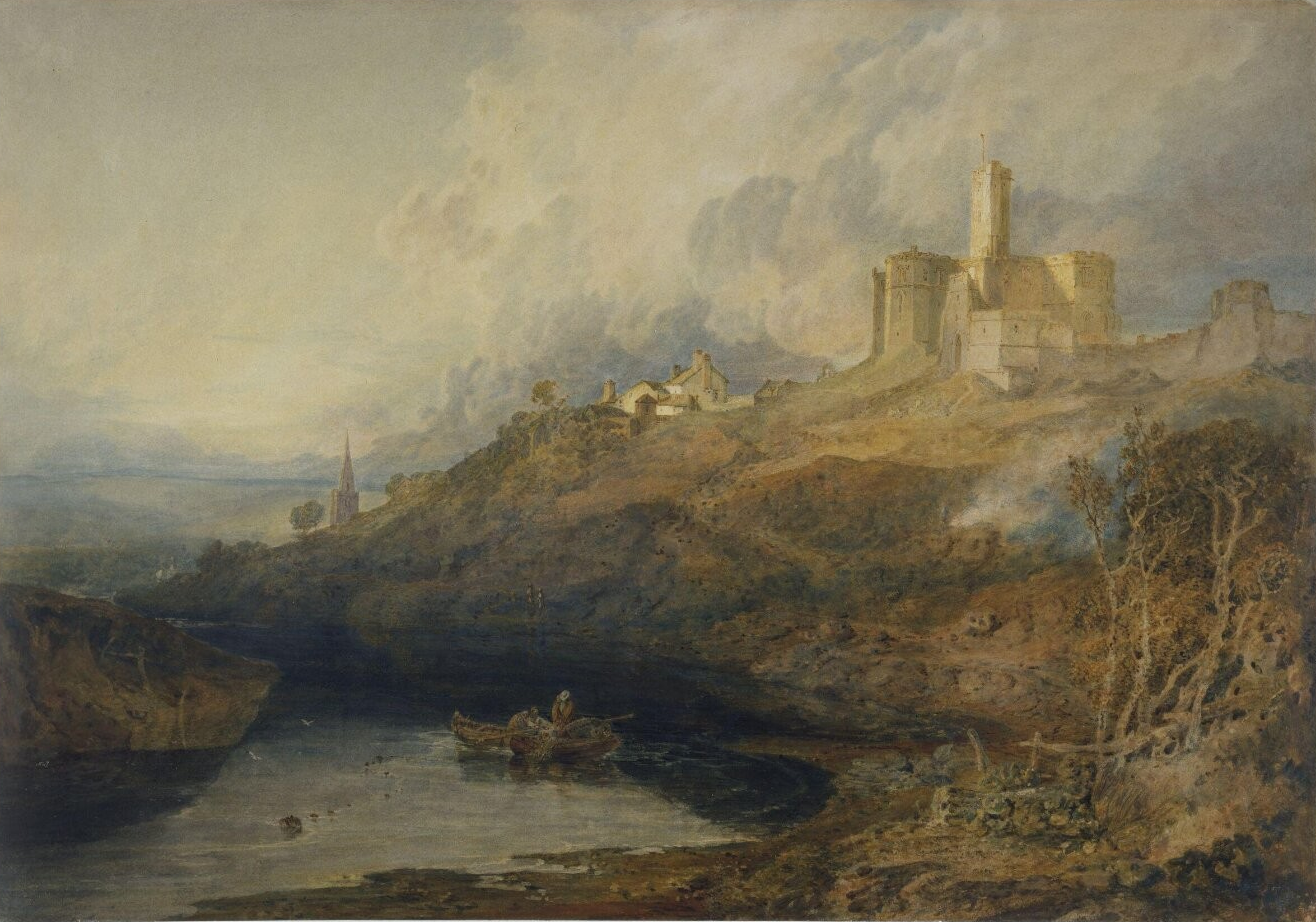
Warkworth Castle, Northumberland by J.M.W. Turner

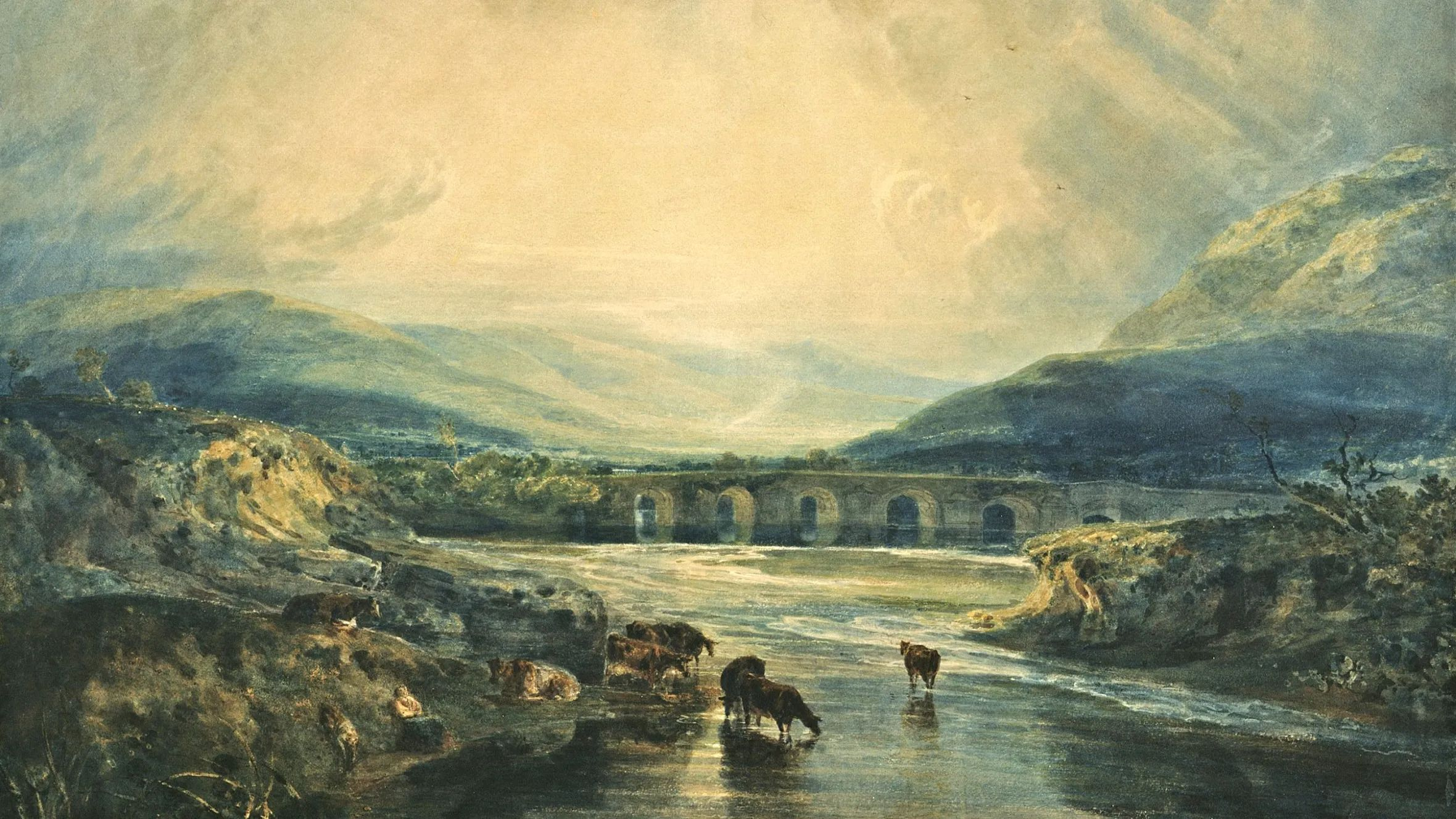
Abergavenny Bridge, Monmouthshire by J.M.W. Turner

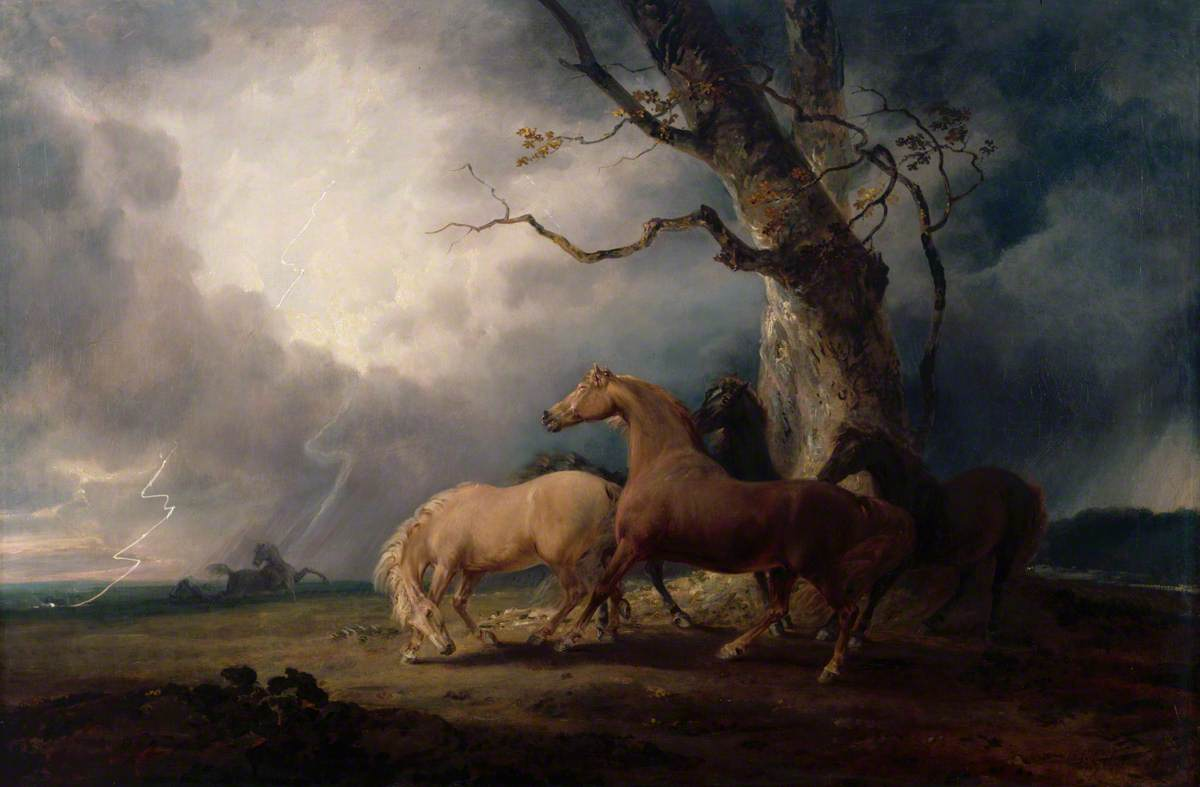
Horses in a Thunderstorm by Sawrey Gilpin

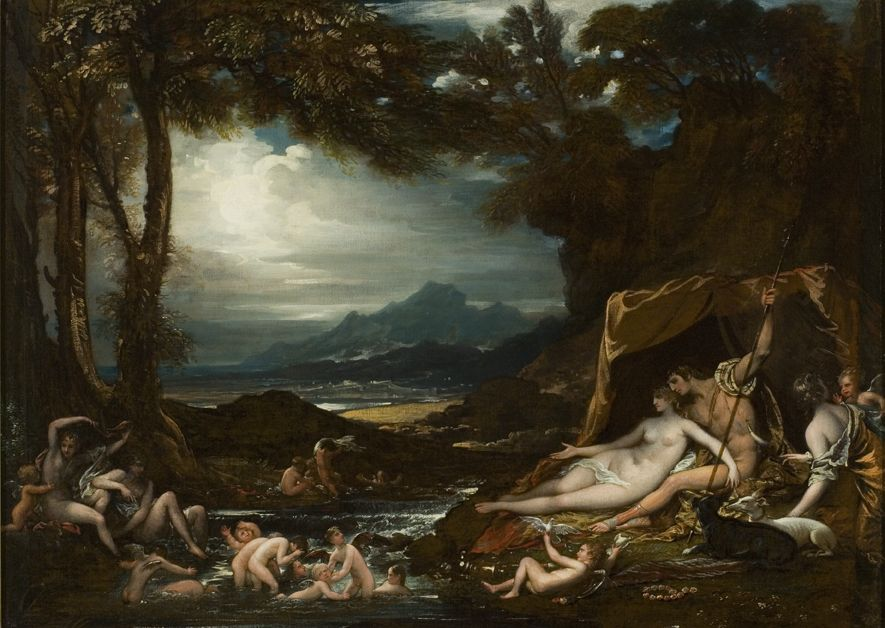
The Bath of Venus by Benjamin West

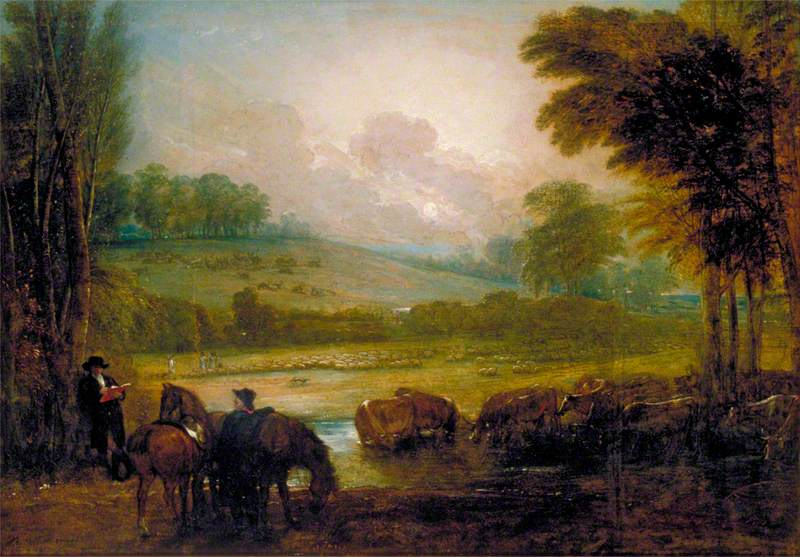
A View of Snow Hill, Windsor by Benjamin West

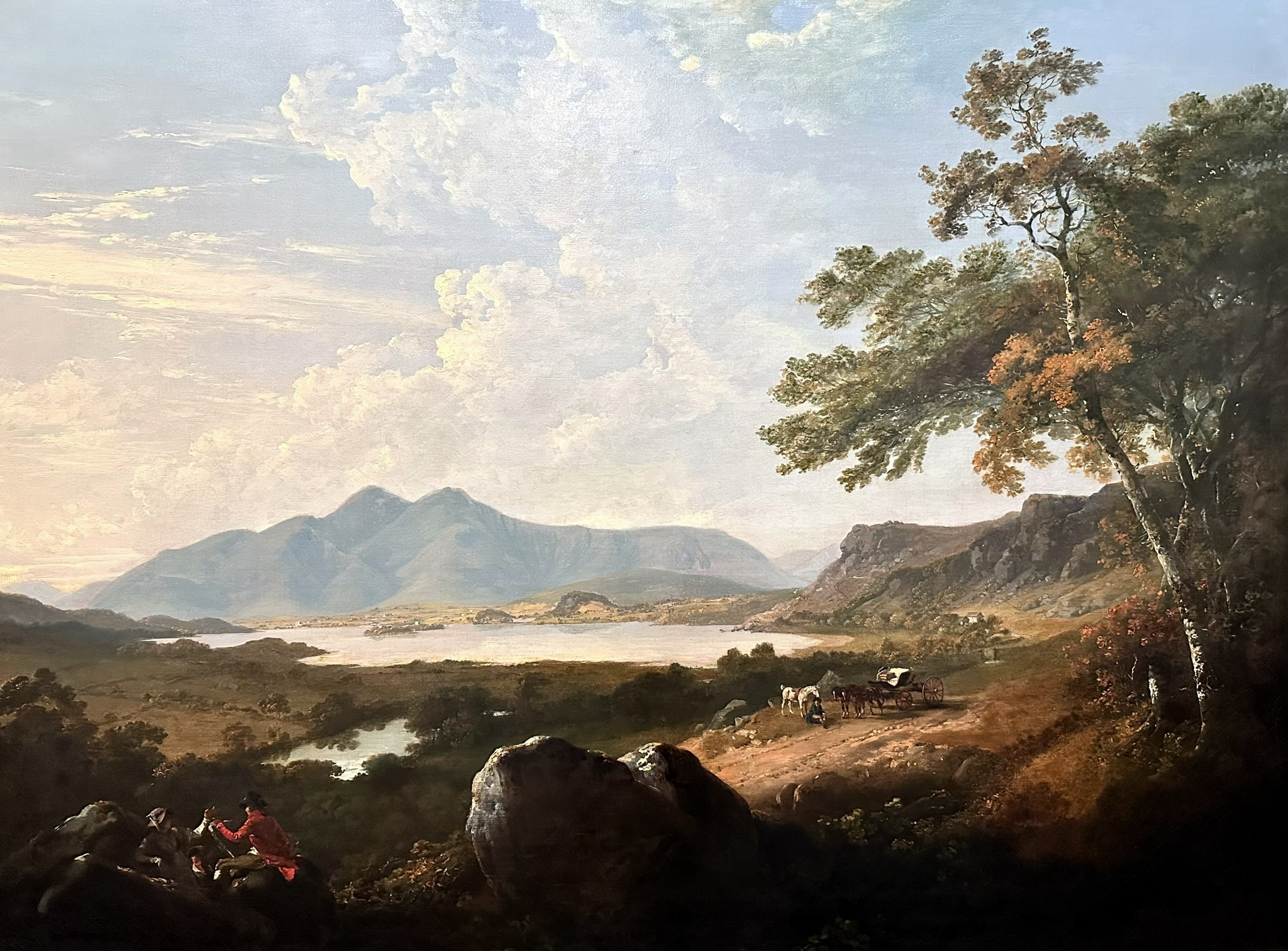
Skiddaw from the Head of Derwentwater by Julius Caesar Ibbetson

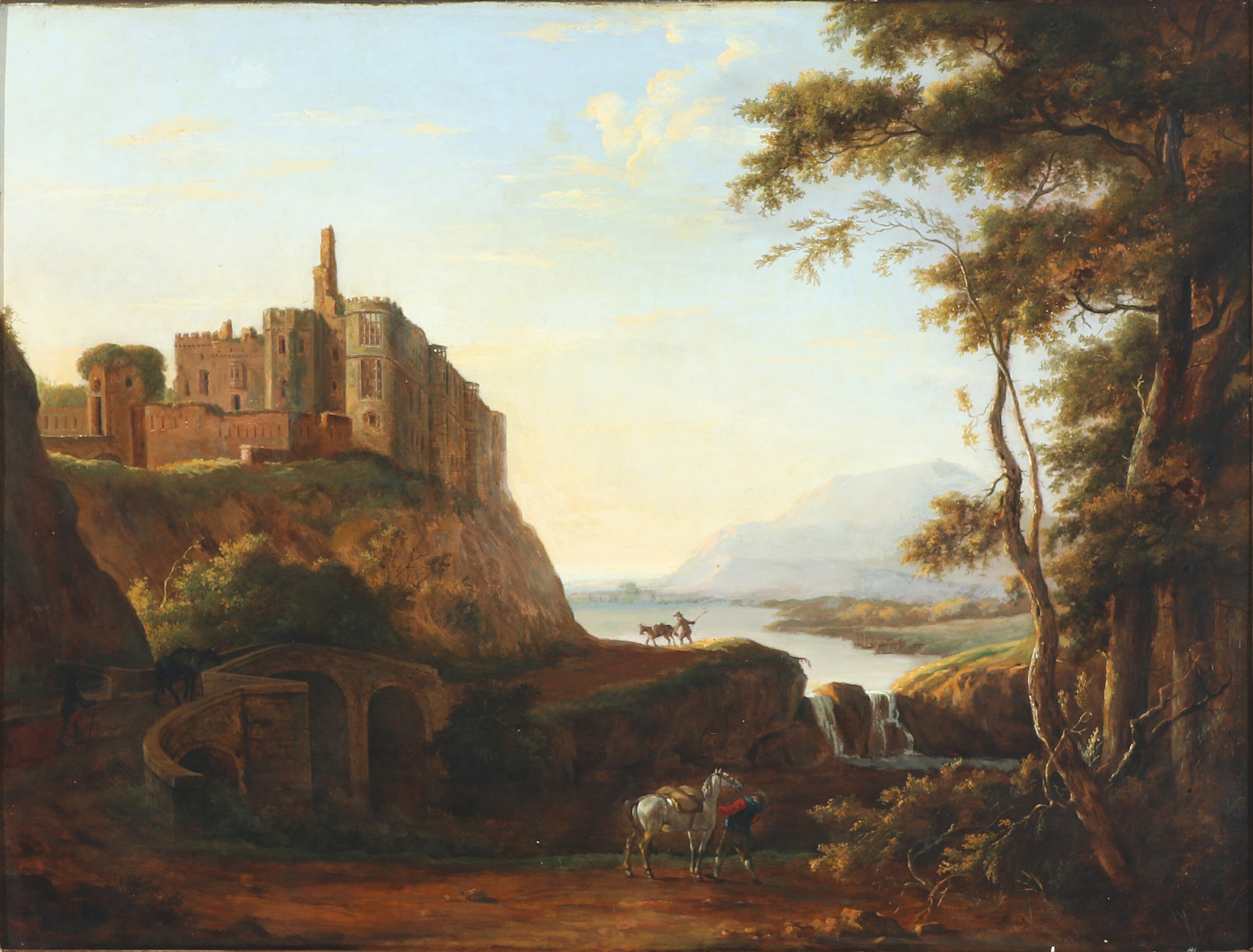
Castle Cary by Hendrik Frans de Cort

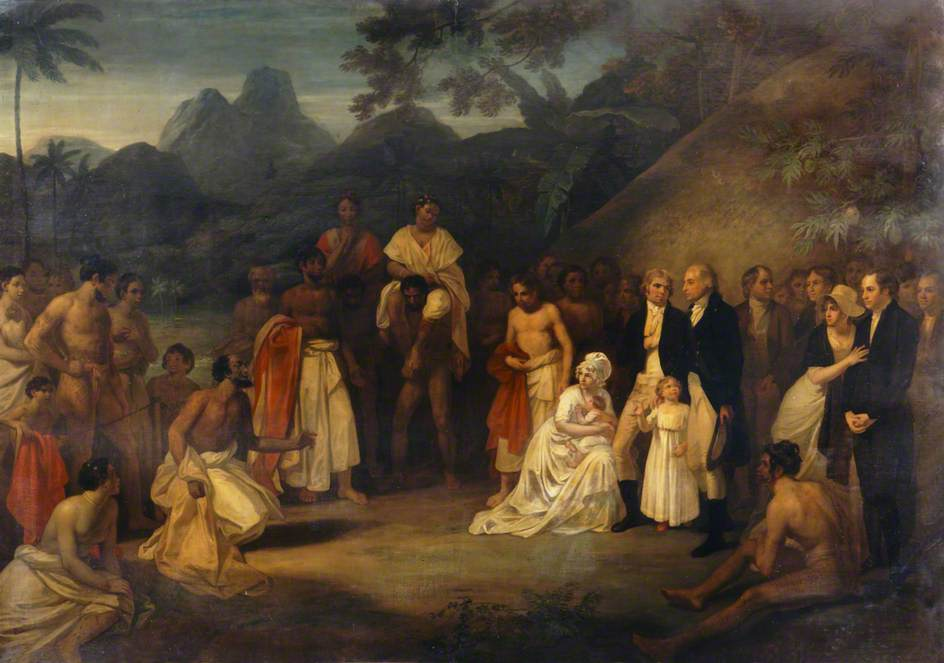
The Cession of the District of Matava by Robert Smirke

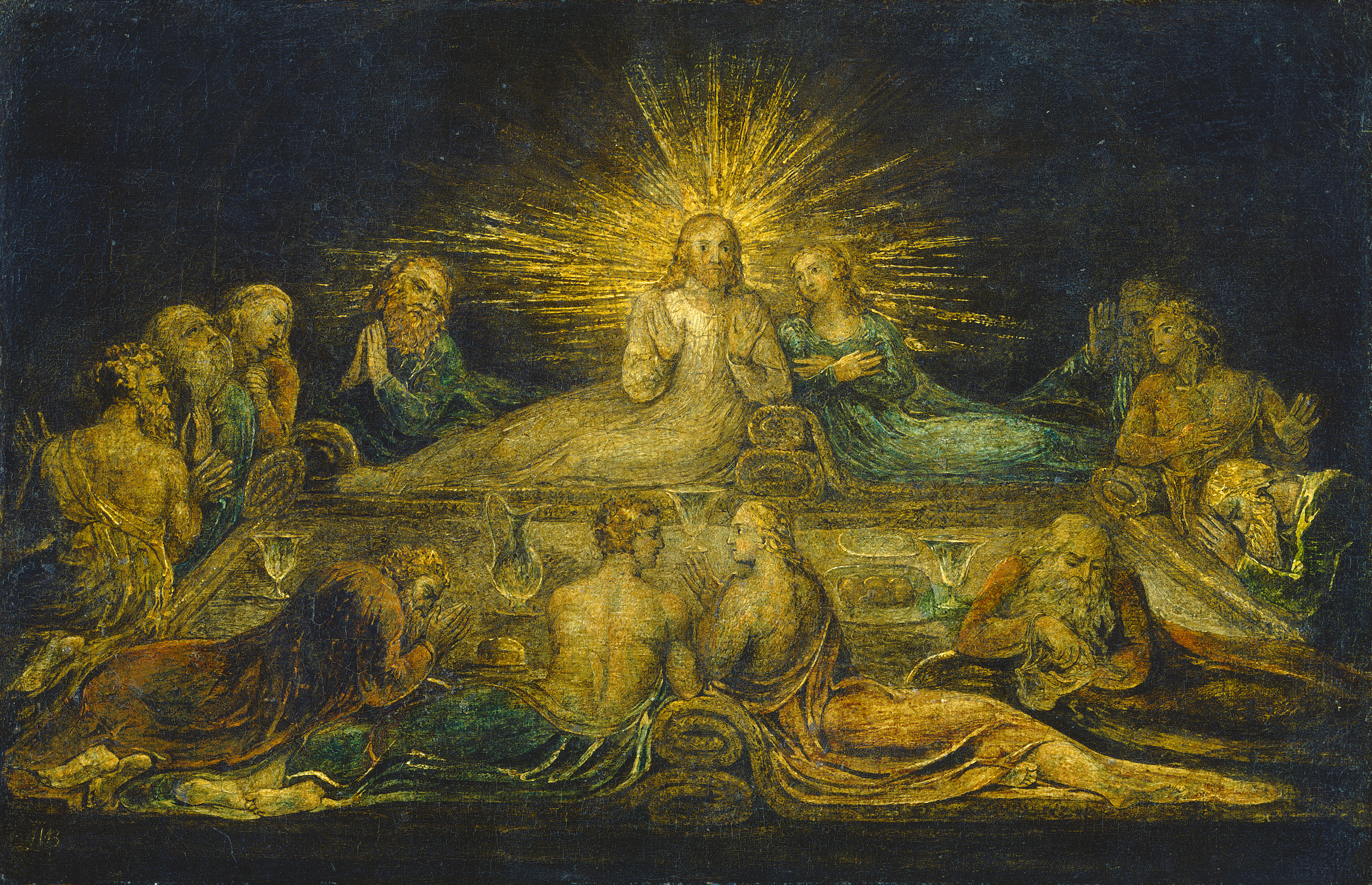
The Last Supper by William Blake

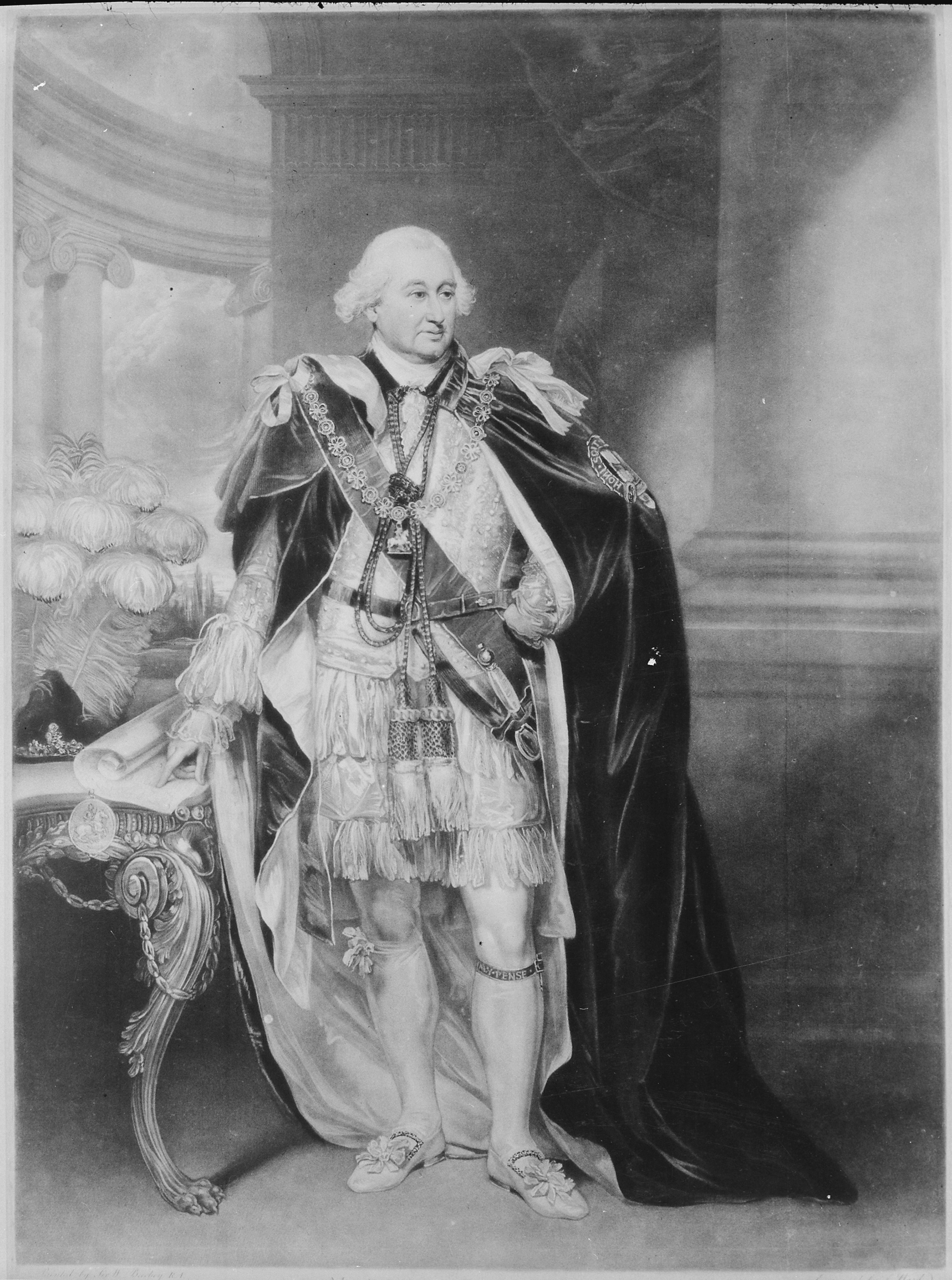
Portrait of Lord Cornwallis, a print based on painting by William Beechey

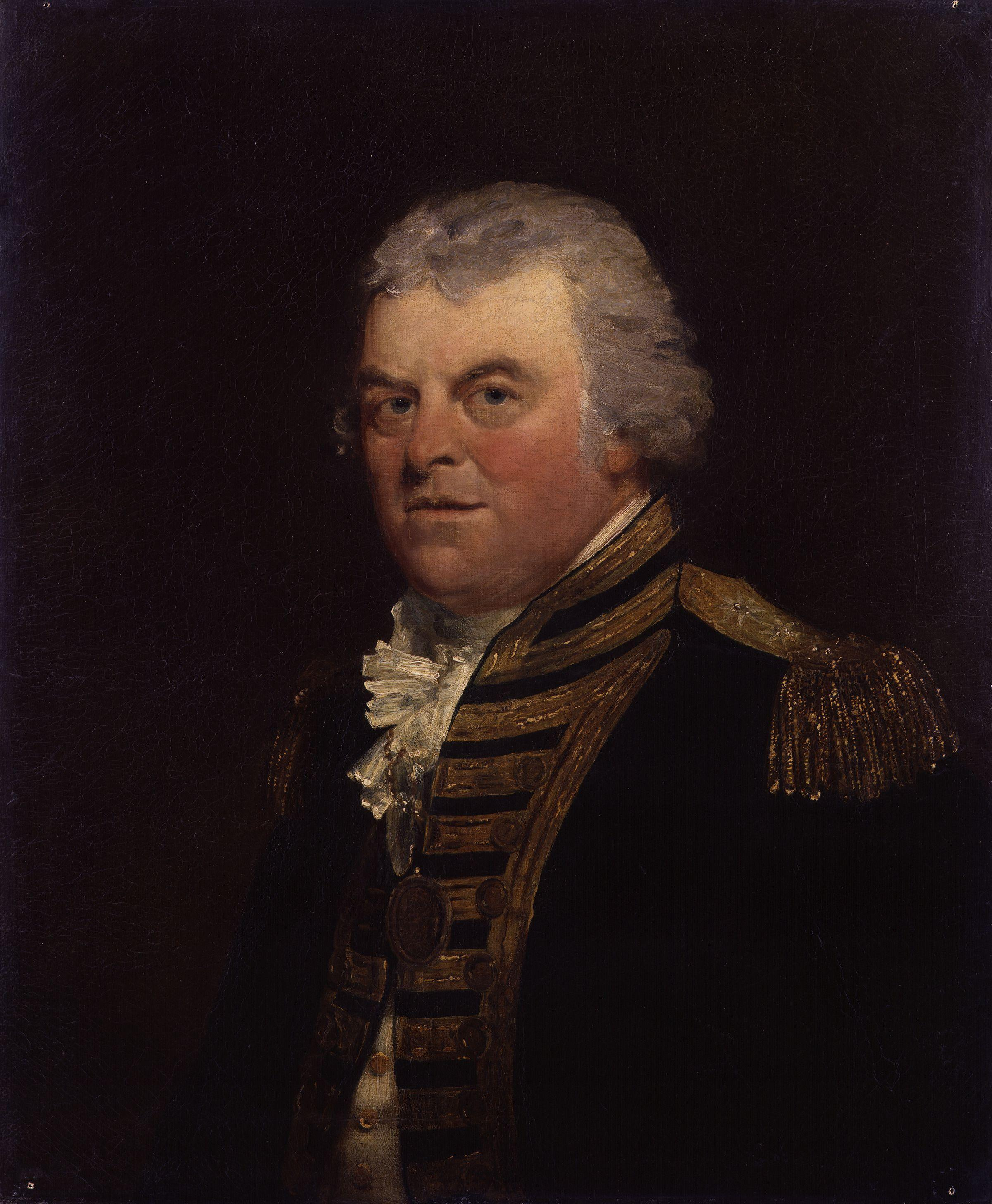
Portrait Admiral Gardner by Theophilus Clarke

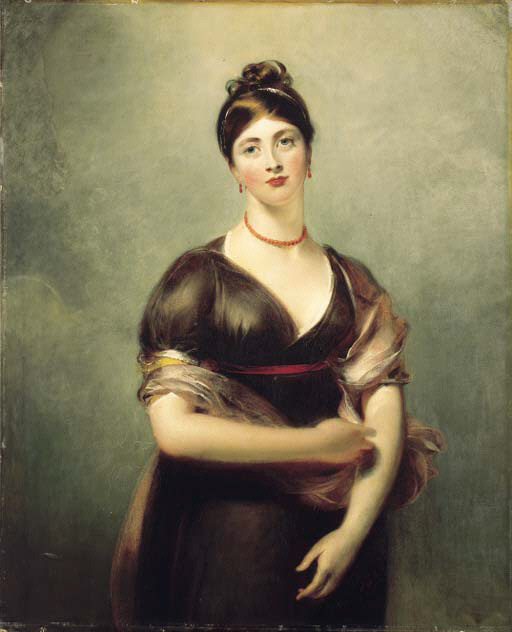
Portrait of Elizabeth Jennings by Thomas Lawrence

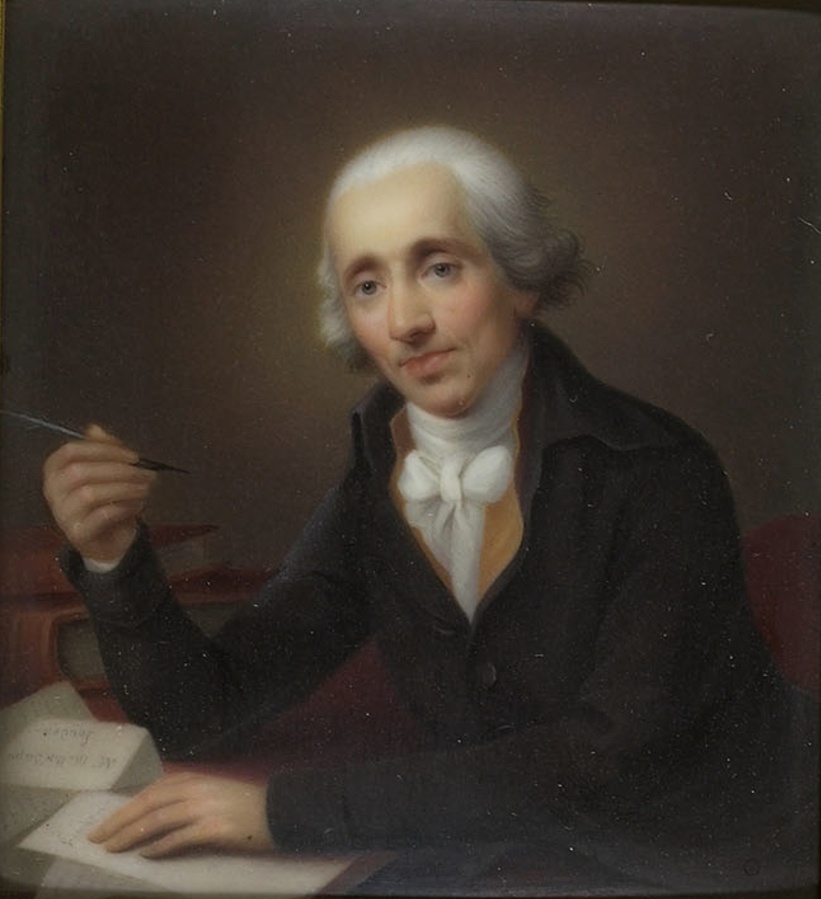
Portrait of Jacques Mallet du Pan by John Francis Rigaud

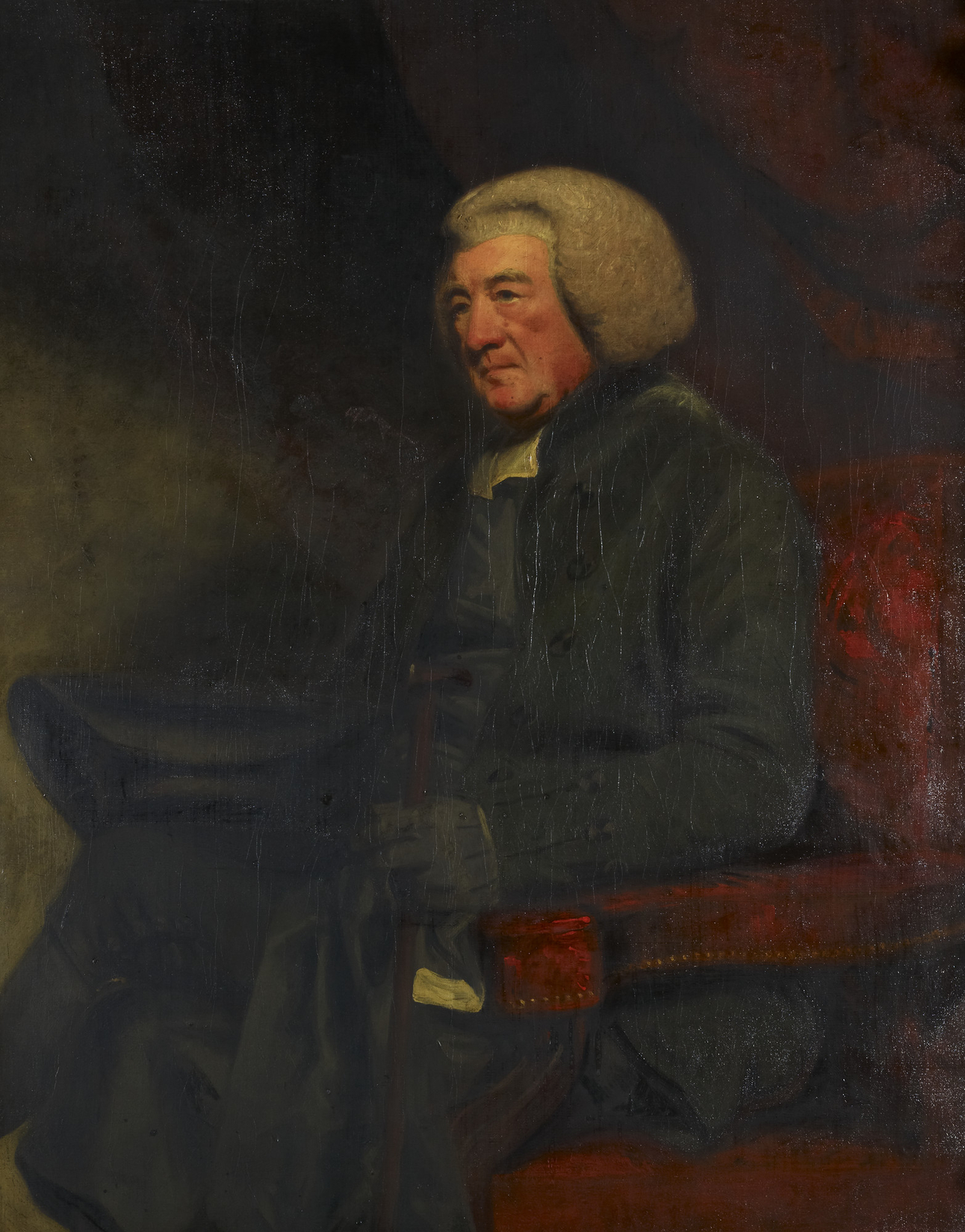
Portrait of William Markham by John Hoppner

== See also ==
- Salon of 1799, held at the Louvre in Paris

== Bibliography ==
- Bailey, Anthony. J.M.W. Turner: Standing in the Sun. Tate Enterprises, 2013.
- Brown, David Blayney. Turner: In the Tate Collection. Harry N. Abrams, 2002.
- Levey, Michael. Sir Thomas Lawrence. Yale University Press, 2005.
- Roberts, Sir William Beechey, R. A.. Duckworth and Company, 1907.
