= Pierre-Simon Girard =

French mathematician and engineer (1765–1836)

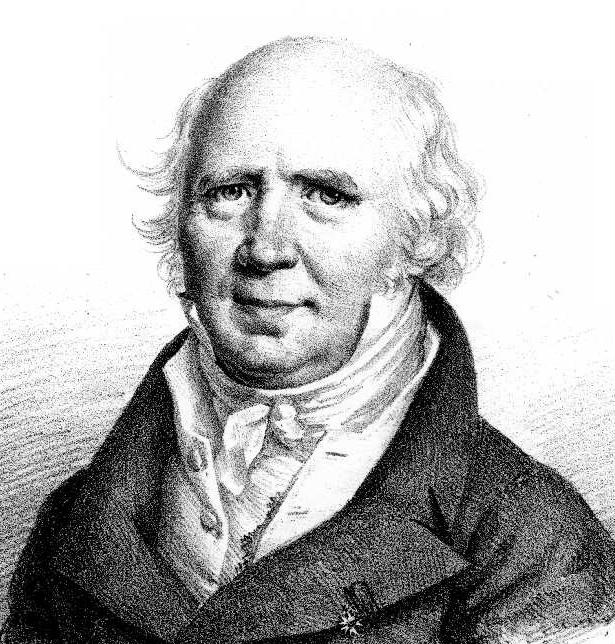
- Pierre-Simon Girard, after a portrait by Julien-Léopold Boilly
- Born: 4 November 1765; Caen, Kingdom of France
- Died: 30 November 1836 (aged 71); Paris, Kingdom of France
- Scientific career
- Fields: Mathematics; Engineering

Pierre-Simon Girard (4 November 1765 – 30 November 1836) was a French mathematician and engineer, who worked on fluid mechanics.

Girard was born in Caen. A prodigy who invented a water turbine at the age of ten, he worked as an engineer at the École Nationale des Ponts et Chaussées. He was in charge of planning and construction of the Amiens canal and the Ourcq canal. He collaborated with Gaspard de Prony on the Dictionnaire des Ponts et Chaussées (Dictionary of Bridges and Highways, 1787). He wrote on fluids, and in 1798 he published a monograph, Traité analytique de la résistance des solides on beam theory, including possibly its first history, within the topic of strength of materials. The complicated beam equations were not of practical much use, since he applied Euler's non-linear theory. In 1799, he and other engineers and scientists accompanied Napoleon on his expedition to Egypt. He died in Paris, aged 71.

== Important works ==
The 1798 monograph Traite Analytique de la Resistance des solides, et des solides d'e'gale Resistance, Auquel on a joint une suite de nouvelles Experiences sur la force, et Velasticite specifique des Bois de Chine et de Sapin was reviewed by Isaac Todhunter, and his editor, Karl Pearson as follows.

This work very fitly closes the labours of the 18th century. It is the first practical treatise on Elasticity; and one of the first attempts to make searching experiments on the elastic properties of beams. It is not only valuable as containing the total knowledge of that day on the subject, but also by reason of an admirable historical introduction... The work appears to have been begun in 1787 and portions of it presented to the Academie in 1792. Its final publication was delayed till the experiments on elastic bodies, the results of which are here tabulated, were concluded at Havre.
