= 1805 in art =

Events in the year 1805 in Art.

== Events ==
- April 17 – English landscape artist Charles Gough sets out with his dog for a walk in the Lake District. On July 27 his skeleton is found on the slopes of Helvellyn, guarded by the dog.
- June – The British Institution (for Promoting the Fine Arts in the United Kingdom) is established in London by a group of connoisseurs.
- 5 June – The British Museum seeks government aid in order to purchase the late Charles Townley's collection of Roman sculpture.
- unknown date – William Blake begins work on the illustrations for Blair's The Grave.

== Works ==
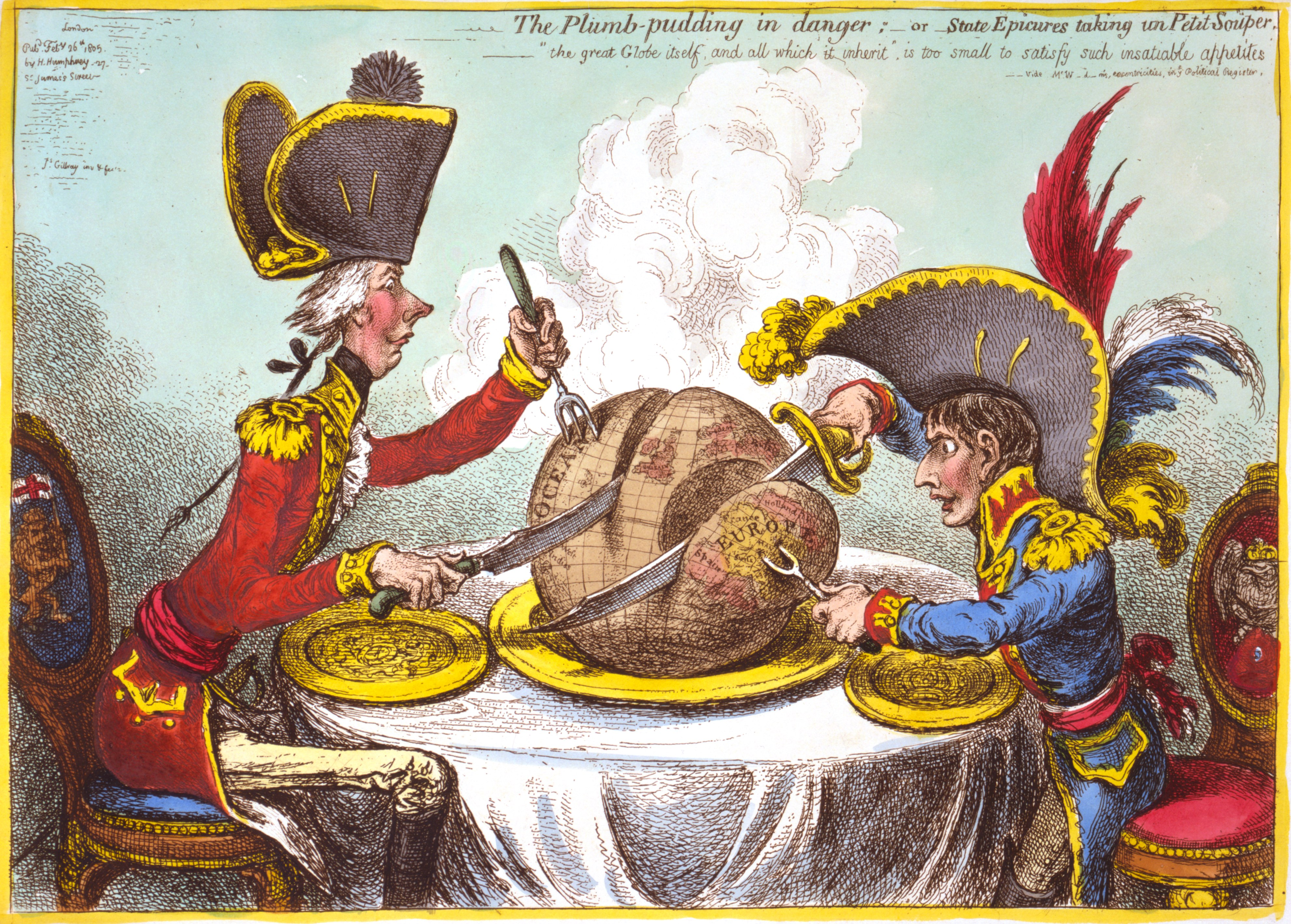
Gillray – The Plumb-pudding in danger - "probably the most famous political cartoon of all time - it has been stolen over and over and over again by cartoonists ever since."

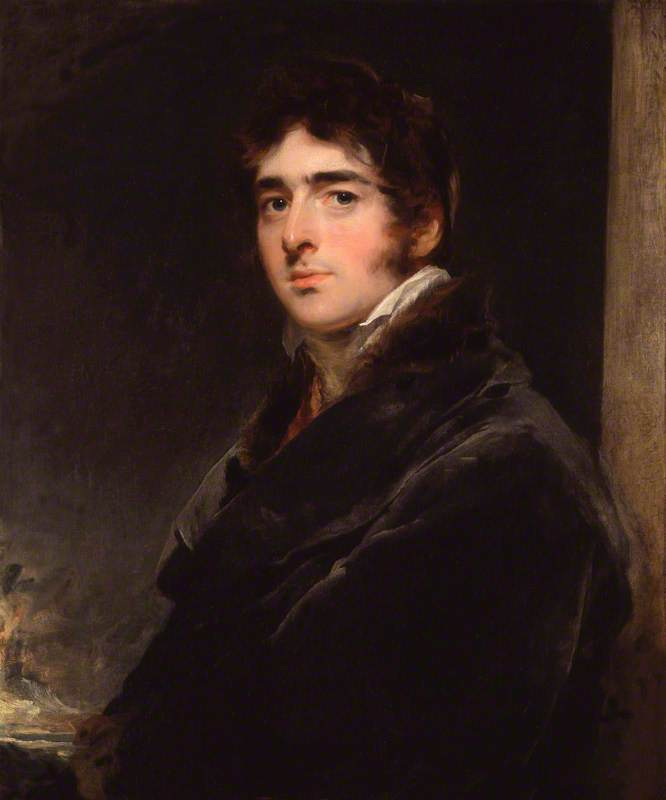
Portrait of Lord Melbourne by Thomas Lawrence.

- William Blake – The Four and Twenty Elders Casting their Crowns before the Divine Throne (pencil and watercolour)
- Vincenzo Camuccini – The Death of Caesar
- John Sell Cotman – Greta Bridge
- Jacques-Louis David – Portrait of Pope Pius VII
- François Gérard
  - Portrait of Catherine Worlée, Princesse de Talleyrand-Périgord (1804–05)
  - Portrait of Madame Récamier
- James Gillray – The Plumb-pudding in danger, or, State Epicures taking un Petit Souper
- Francisco Goya (approximate dates)
  - The Clothed Maja
  - Portrait of Doña Isabel de Porcel
- Thomas Douglas Guest – Bearing the Dead Body of Patroclus to the Camp, Achilles's Grief
- Orest Kiprensky – Prince Dmitri Donskoi after the Battle of Kulikovo
- Marianne Kürzinger – Gallia Protects Bavaria
- Thomas Lawrence
  - Portrait of Lady Elizabeth Foster
  - Portrait of Lord Melbourne
- Philip James de Loutherbourg
  - The Evening Coach
  - The River Wye at Tintern Abbey
- Joseph Denis Odevaere – Portrait of François Wynckelman, François van der Donckt and Joseph Odevaere (Groeningemuseum)
- Richard Westall – The Reconciliation of Helen and Paris After His Defeat by Menelaus
- J.M.W. Turner
  - The Destruction of Sodom
  - The Deluge
  - Windsor Castle from the Thames
- David Wilkie – The Village Recruit

== Awards ==
- Grand Prix de Rome, painting:
- Grand Prix de Rome, sculpture:
- Grand Prix de Rome, architecture:
- Grand Prix de Rome, music: Ferdinand Gasse & Victor Dourlen.

== Births ==
- January 14 – Carlo Marochetti, sculptor (died 1867)
- January 27 – Samuel Palmer, landscape painter and etcher (died 1881)
- April 5 – Samuel Forde, painter (died 1828)
- April 20 – Franz Xaver Winterhalter, painter (died 1873)
- May 11 – Philipp Foltz, painter (died 1877)
- July 14 – John Frederick Lewis, painter (died 1876)
- July 26 – Constantino Brumidi, fresco painter (died 1880)
- July 29 – Hiram Powers, American neoclassical sculptor (died 1873)
- September 6 – Horatio Greenough, sculptor (died 1852)
- September 10 – Guillaume Geefs, sculptor (died 1883)
- October 23 – Adalbert Stifter, Austrian writer, poet, painter, and pedagogue (died 1868)

== Deaths ==
- February 2 – Thomas Banks, English sculptor (born 1735)
- March 4 – Jean-Baptiste Greuze, French painter (born 1725)
- April 28 – Charles-Antoine Bridan, French sculptor (born 1730)
- May 2 – Vieira Portuense, Portuguese painter (born 1765)
- May 24 – Fedot Shubin, Russian sculptor (born 1740)
- June 7 – James Gabriel Huquier, French portrait painter and engraver (born 1725)
- June 19 – Louis-Jean-François Lagrenée, French painter (born 1724)
- July 10 – Thomas Wedgwood, English pioneer photographer (born 1771)
- December 6 – Nicolas-Jacques Conté, French painter and inventor of the pencil (born 1755)
- December 27 – Jean-Baptiste Claudot, French painter of landscapes, flowers and still-life (born 1733)
- date unknown
  - Pyotr Drozhdin, Russian painter (born 1745)
  - Thomas Hardy, English portrait painter (born 1757))
  - Gustaf Lucander, Finnish painter (born 1724)
  - Francesco Pozzi, Italian engraver (born 1750)
  - Marie-Thérèse Reboul, French painter of natural history, still lifes, and flowers (born 1728)
  - Deng Shiru, Chinese calligrapher during the Qing Dynasty (born 1739/1743)
