= Portrait of Lord Camden =

Painting by John Hoppner

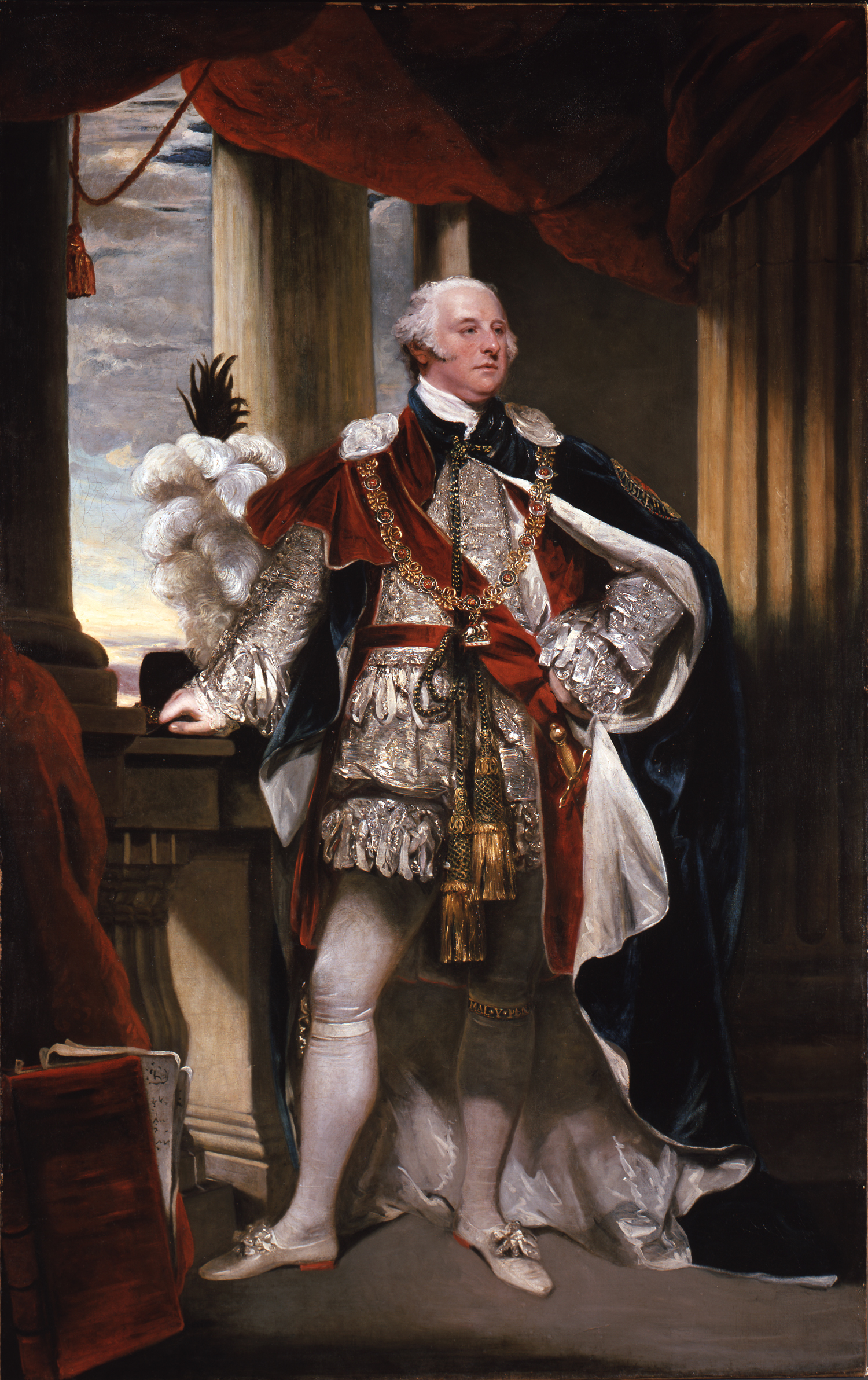
- Artist: John Hoppner
- Year: 1806
- Type: Oil on canvas, portrait painting
- Dimensions: 249 cm × 149 cm (98 in × 59 in)
- Location: Gemäldegalerie, Berlin

Portrait of Lord Camden is an oil on canvas portrait painting by the British artist John Hoppner, from 1806. It depicts the politician John Pratt, Earl of Camden.

== History ==
During the premiership of William Pitt the Younger he served as Lord Lieutenant of Ireland and Secretary of War. A noted Tory, he later served as Lord President of the Council and in 1812 he became Marquess Camden. He is shown at full-length, wearing the robes of the Order of the Garter.

Hoppner was a leading portraitist of the period and a noted rival of Thomas Lawrence. The picture was displayed at the Royal Academy Exhibition of 1806 at Somerset House in London. Today the painting is in the Gemäldegalerie in Berlin, having been acquired in 1981. In 1807 the engraver William Ward produced a mezzotint based on the portrait.

== Bibliography ==
- Grosshans, Rainald (ed.) Gemäldegalerie Berlin. Prestel, 1998.
- Skipton, Horace Pitt Kennedy. John Hoppner. Methuen, 1905.
