= The Village Politicians =

Painting by David Wilkie

- Artist: David Wilkie
- Year: 1806
- Type: Oil on canvas, genre painting
- Dimensions: 57.2 cm × 74.9 cm (22.5 in × 29.5 in)
- Location: Scone Palace, Perthshire

The Village Politicians is an 1806 genre painting by the British artist David Wilkie. It depicts a group of figures gathered round a table on a cramped village inn in Scotland. Intently discussing some matter, The painting purposefully emulates the style of the Dutch Old Masters of the seventeenth century, a common feature of Wilkie's early works.

The Scottish Wilkie had moved to London in 1805 to attend the Royal Academy Schools. The picture was commissioned by the Earl of Mansfield. It was displayed at the Royal Academy Exhibition of 1806 at Somerset House in London. The success of the work with the public made Wilkie an overnight celebrity at the age of twenty.

The painting is today remains in the collection of the Earl of Mansfield at Scone Palace.

== by John Lewis Krimmel ==
The Village Politicians
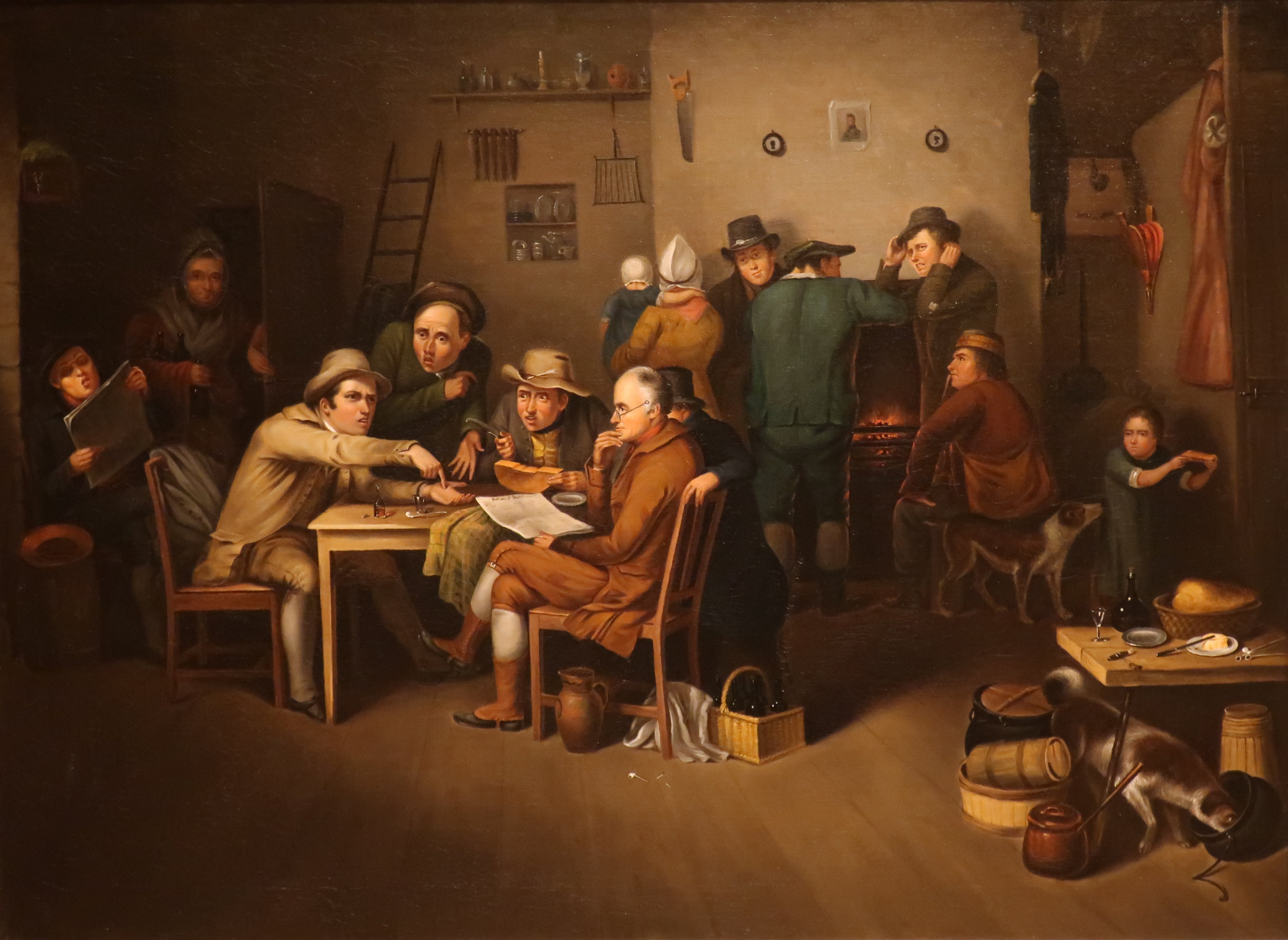
- Artist: John Lewis Krimmel
- Year: c. 1819
- Type: Oil on canvas, genre painting
- Location: Crystal Bridges Museum of American Art, Bentonville, Arkansas

In the 2010s and 2020s, a cropped version of "The Village Politicians" by John Lewis Krimmel became a popular Internet meme.

== Bibliography ==
- Fairclough, Mary. The Romantic Crowd: Sympathy, Controversy and Print Culture. Cambridge University Press, 2013.
- Solkin, David H. Painting Out of the Ordinary: Modernity and the Art of Everyday Life in Early Nineteenth-century Britain. Yale University Press, 2009.
- Tromans, Nicholas. David Wilkie: The People's Painter. Edinburgh University Press, 2007.
