= The River Wye at Tintern Abbey =

Painting by Philip James de Loutherbourg

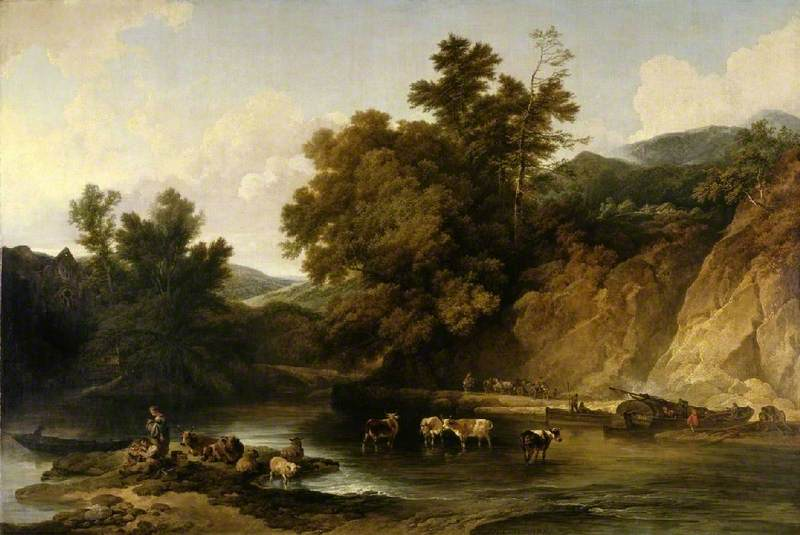
- Artist: Philip James de Loutherbourg
- Year: 1805
- Type: Oil on canvas, landscape painting
- Dimensions: 108 cm × 161.9 cm (43 in × 63.7 in)
- Location: Fitzwilliam Museum, Cambridge

The River Wye at Tintern Abbey is an 1805 landscape painting by the French-born British artist Philip James de Loutherbourg. It depicts a view on the River Wye by Tintern Abbey in Monmouthshire. The area was a noted one during the romantic era and features in the 1798 poem Lines Written a Few Miles above Tintern Abbey by William Wordsworth.

The work was displayed at the Royal Academy's Summer Exhibition of 1806 at Somerset House in London along with The Evening Coach. The painting is in the collection of the Fitzwilliam Museum in Cambridge, having been acquired in 1958.

== See also ==
- Wye Tour

== Bibliography ==
- Bate, Jonathan. The Song of the Earth. Harvard University Press, 2000.
- Hermann, Luke. British Landscape Painting of the Eighteenth Century. Oxford University Press, 1974.
- Preston, Lillian Elvira. Philippe Jacques de Loutherbourg: Eighteenth Century Romantic Artist and Scene Designer. University of Florida, 1977.
- Rosenthal, Michael. British Landscape Painting. Cornell University Press, 1982.
