= Royal Academy Exhibition of 1806 =

1806 art exhibition in London

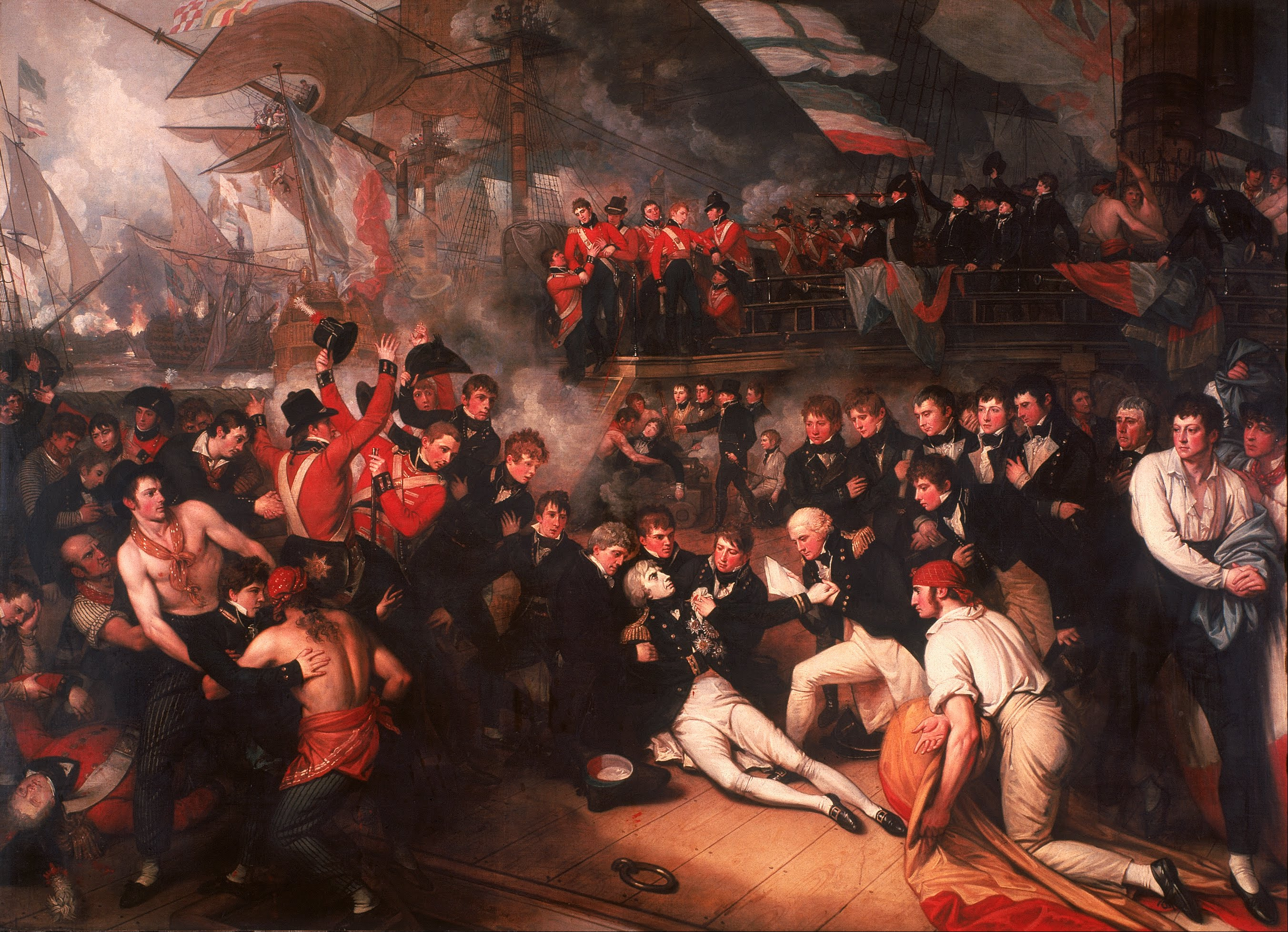
The Death of Nelson by Benjamin West. Due to a dispute with the Academy West displayed work at a rival, private exhibition.

The Royal Academy Exhibition of 1806 was an art exhibition held at Somerset House in London between 5 May and 21 June 1806. It was the thirty eighth annual Summer Exhibition staged by the Royal Academy of Arts.

It was staged at a turbulent time for the organisation. The previous President of the Royal Academy, the American painter Benjamin West had been outsted and replaced by the architect James Wyatt. West staged his own exhibition featuring the large The Death of Nelson depicting the Battle of Trafalgar which drew over thirty thousand spectators including George III who missed the opening of the academy's exhibition. West would return to the Royal Academy as president later the same year. 1806 also marked the first year of the rival British Institution which held its own exhibition of in Pall Mall at the same time.

The academy's submissions including portrait paintings from Thomas Lawrence who emerged as the leading portraitist of the Regency era. Amongst his works was a painting feature the mistress and son of the Marquess of Abercorn. John Hoppner displayed a picture of the Prime Minister William Pitt the Younger.

The French artist Philip James de Loutherbourg exhibited his landscape paintings The Evening Coach and The River Wye at Tintern Abbey. The young Scottish artist David Wilkie enjoyed his breakthrough with the genre painting The Village Politicians.

== Gallery ==
Portrait of Joseph Banks by Thomas Lawrence

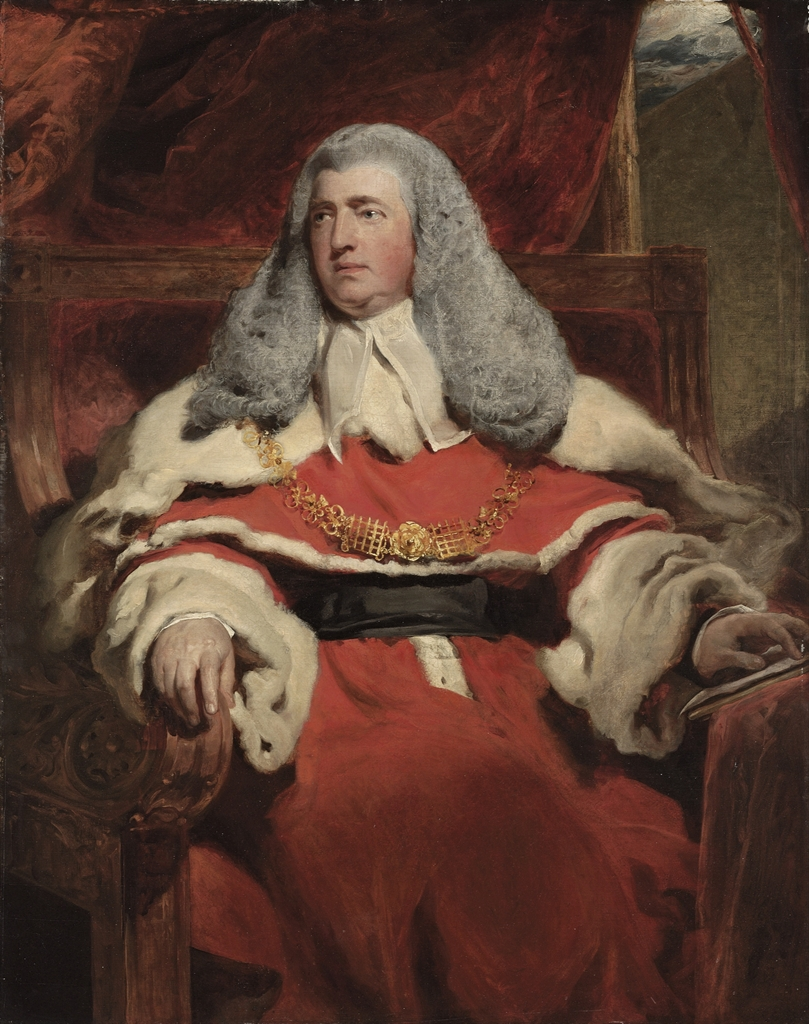
Portrait of Lord Ellenborough by Thomas Lawrence

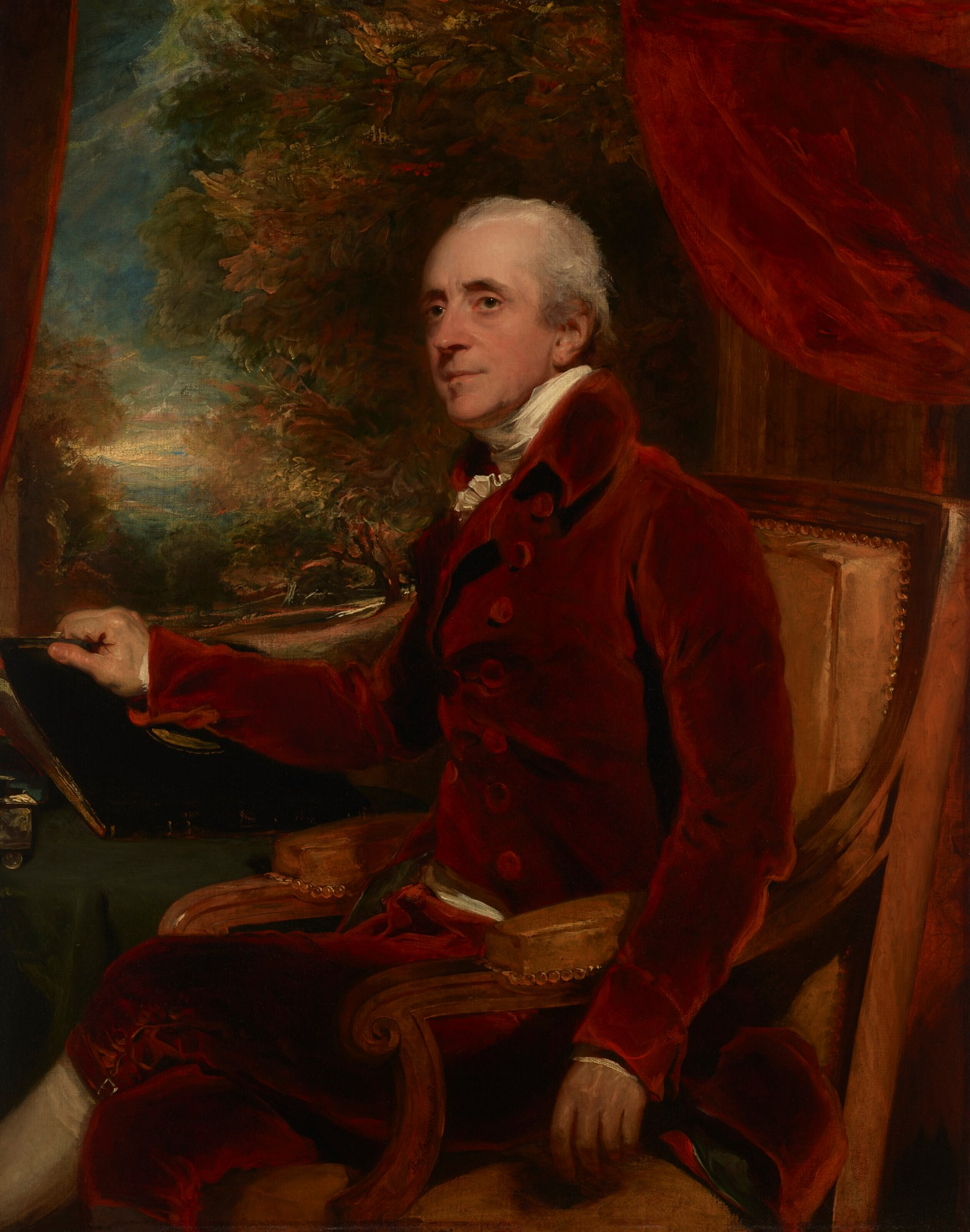
Portrait of William Baker by Thomas Lawrence

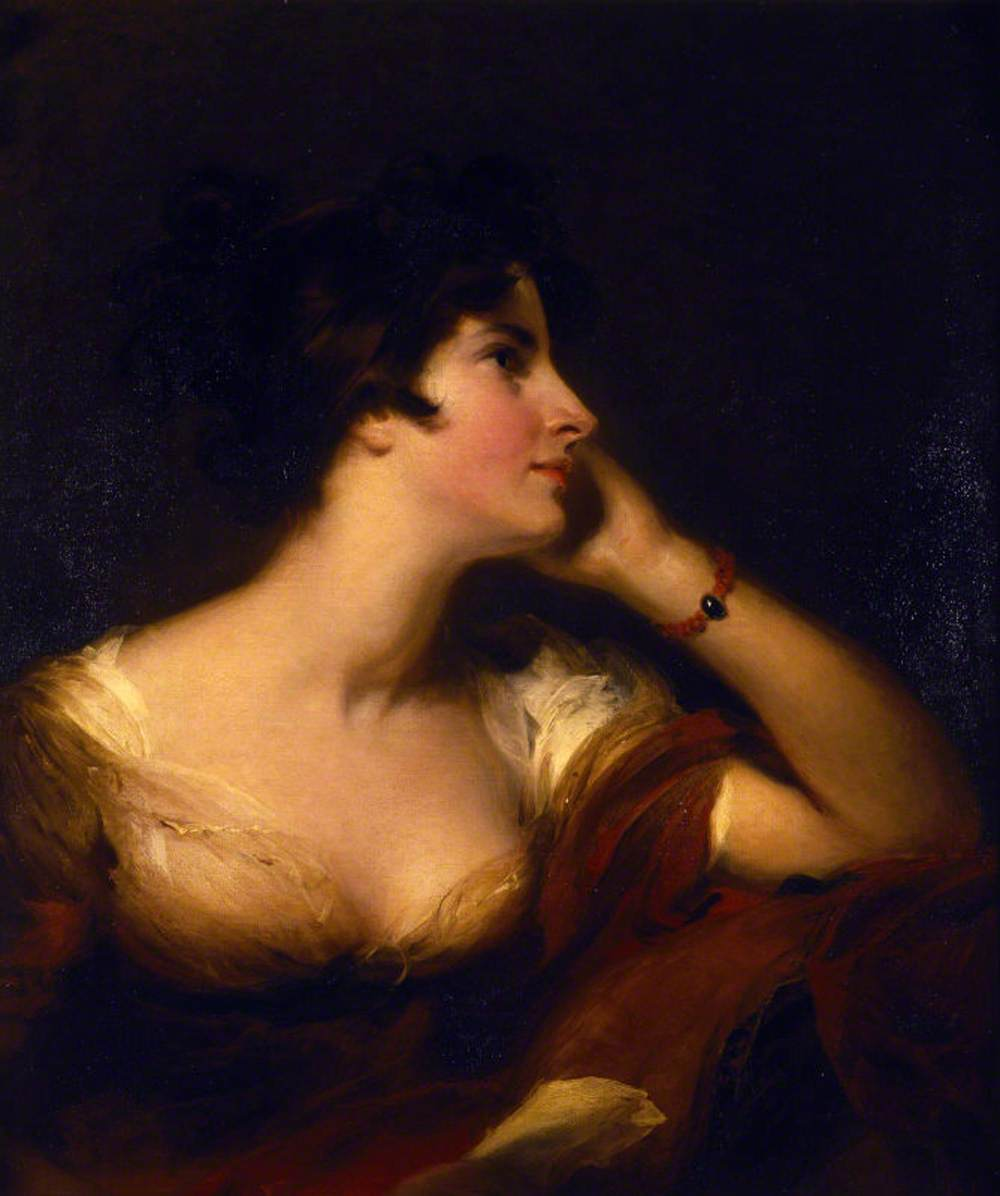
Portrait of Maria Riddell by Thomas Lawrence

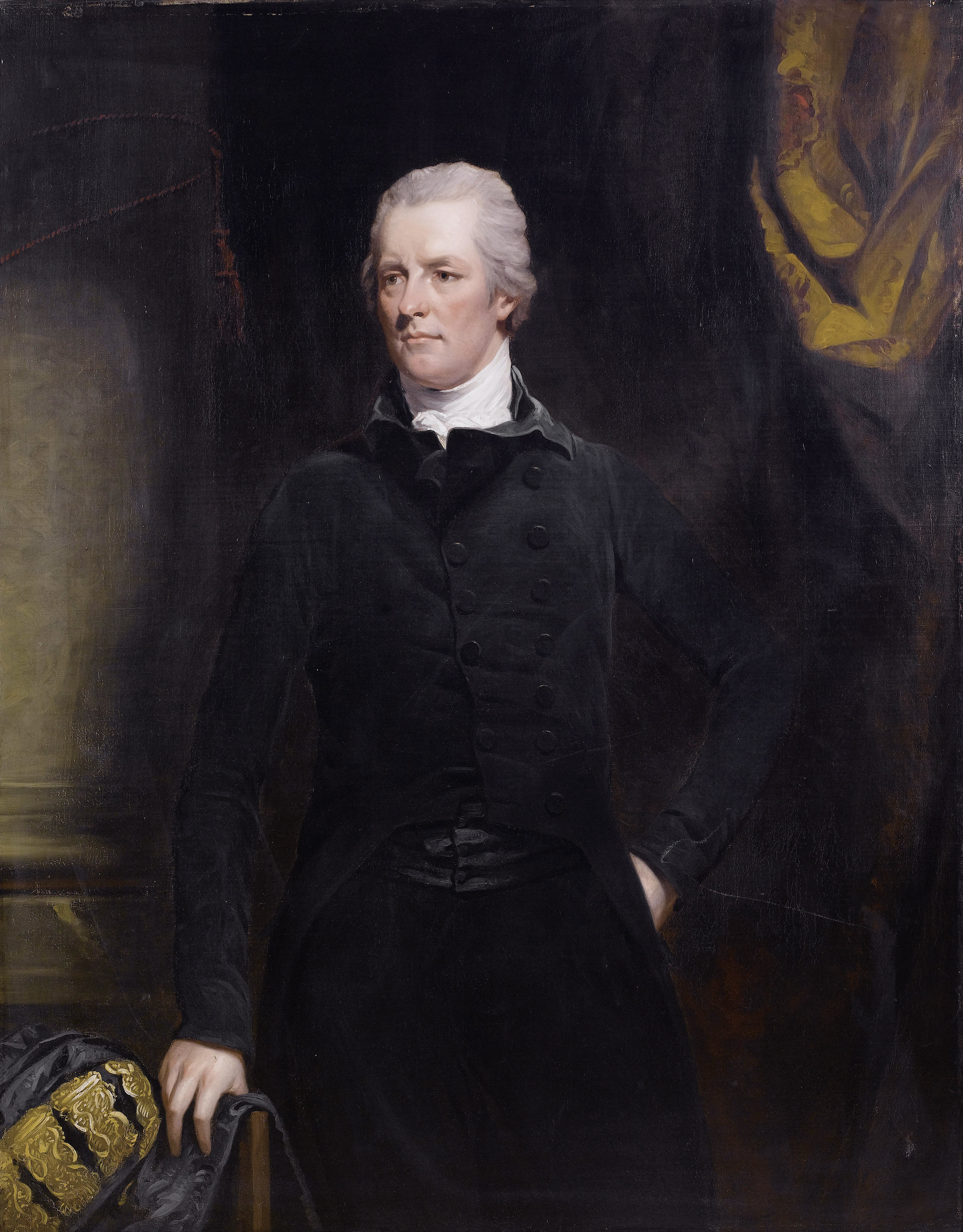
Portrait of William Pitt by John Hoppner

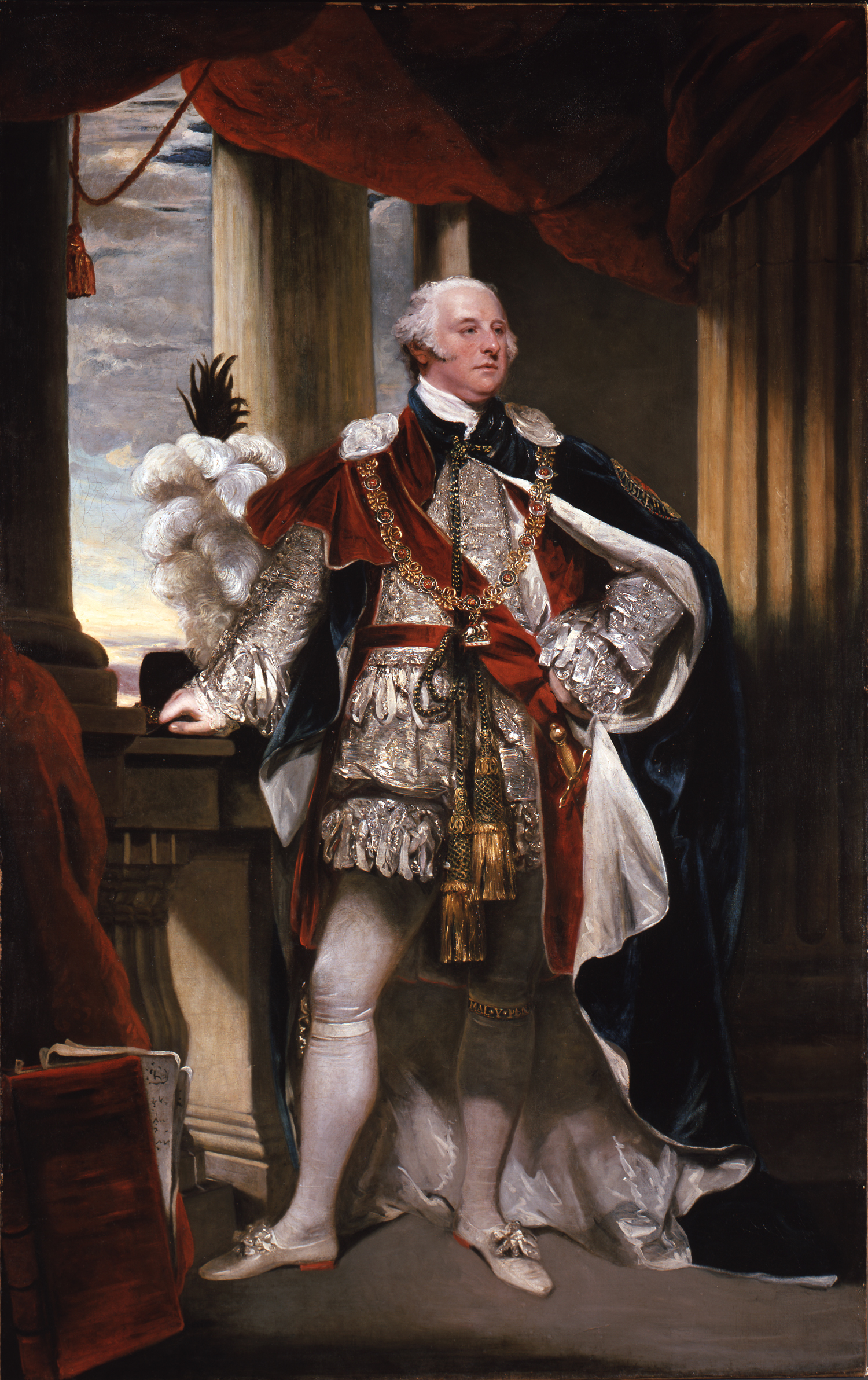
Portrait of Lord Camden by John Hoppner

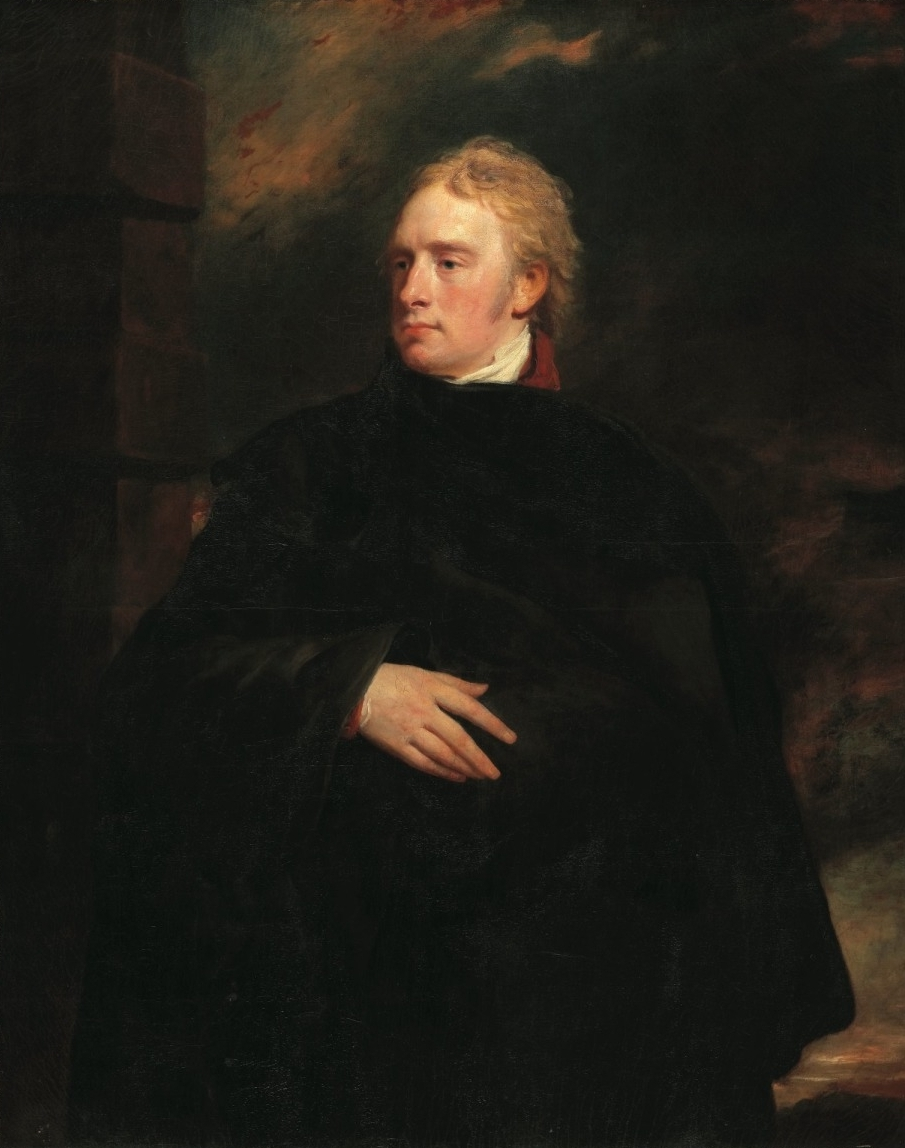
Portrait of John Hookham Frere by John Hoppner

Portrait of the Marquess of Hartington by Martin Archer Shee

The Village Politicians by David Wilkie

An Old Cottage, St Albans by William Mulready

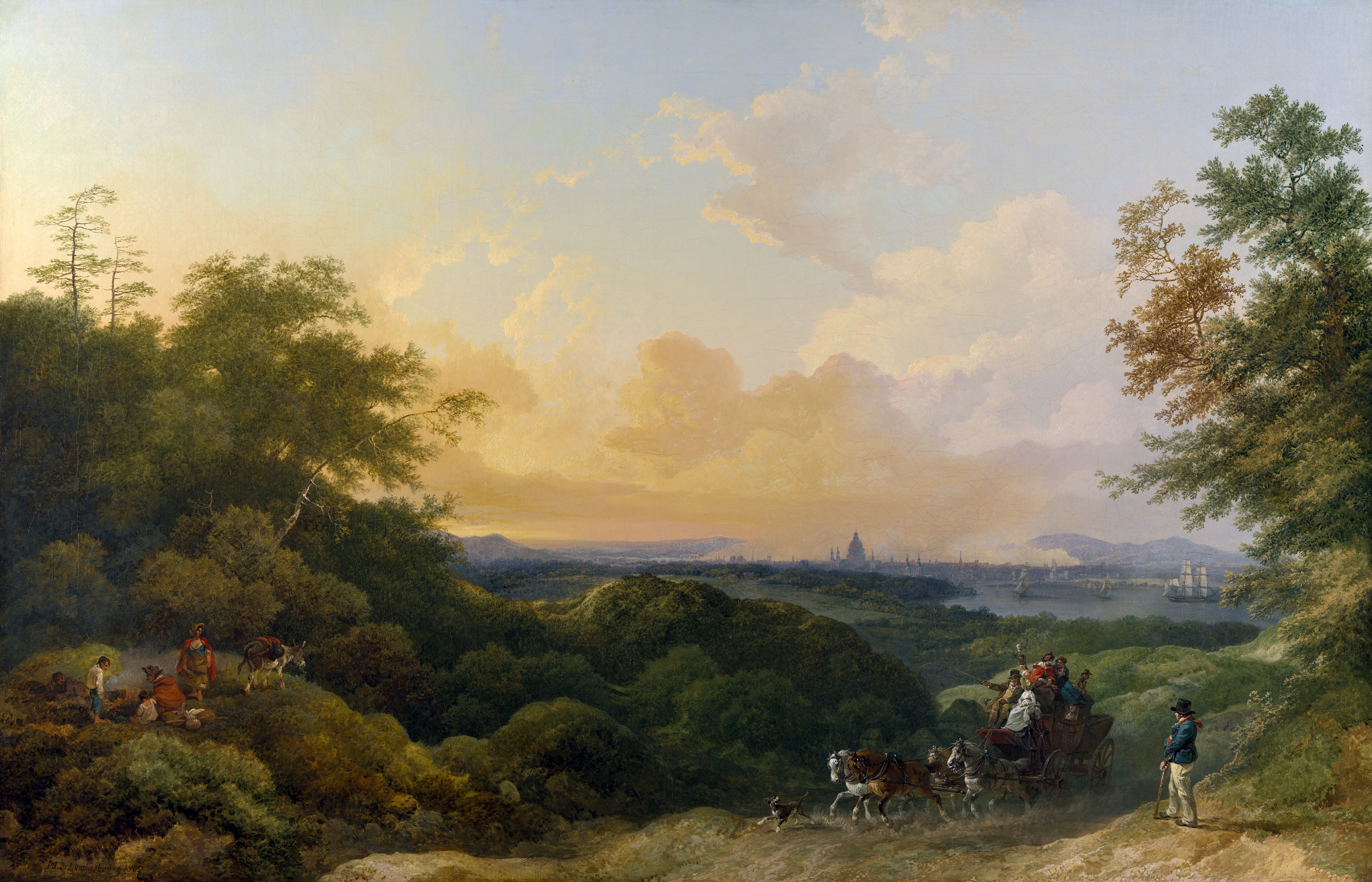
The Evening Coach by Philip James de Loutherbourg

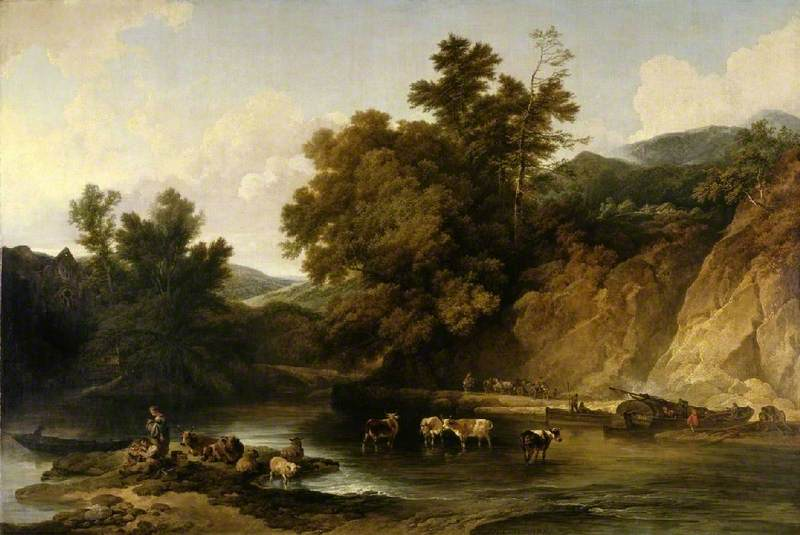
The River Wye at Tintern Abbey by Philip James de Loutherbourg

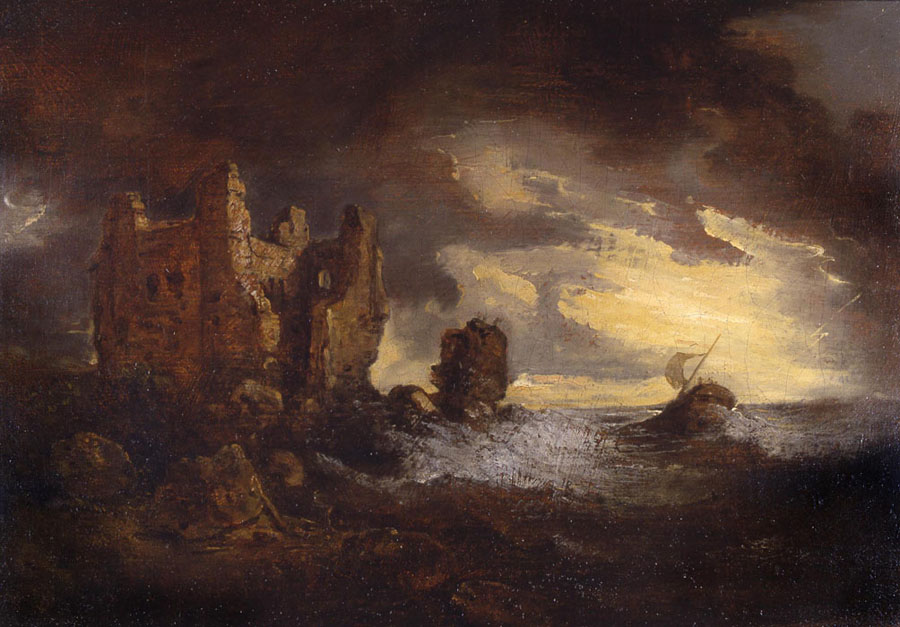
Peele Castle in a Storm by George Beaumont

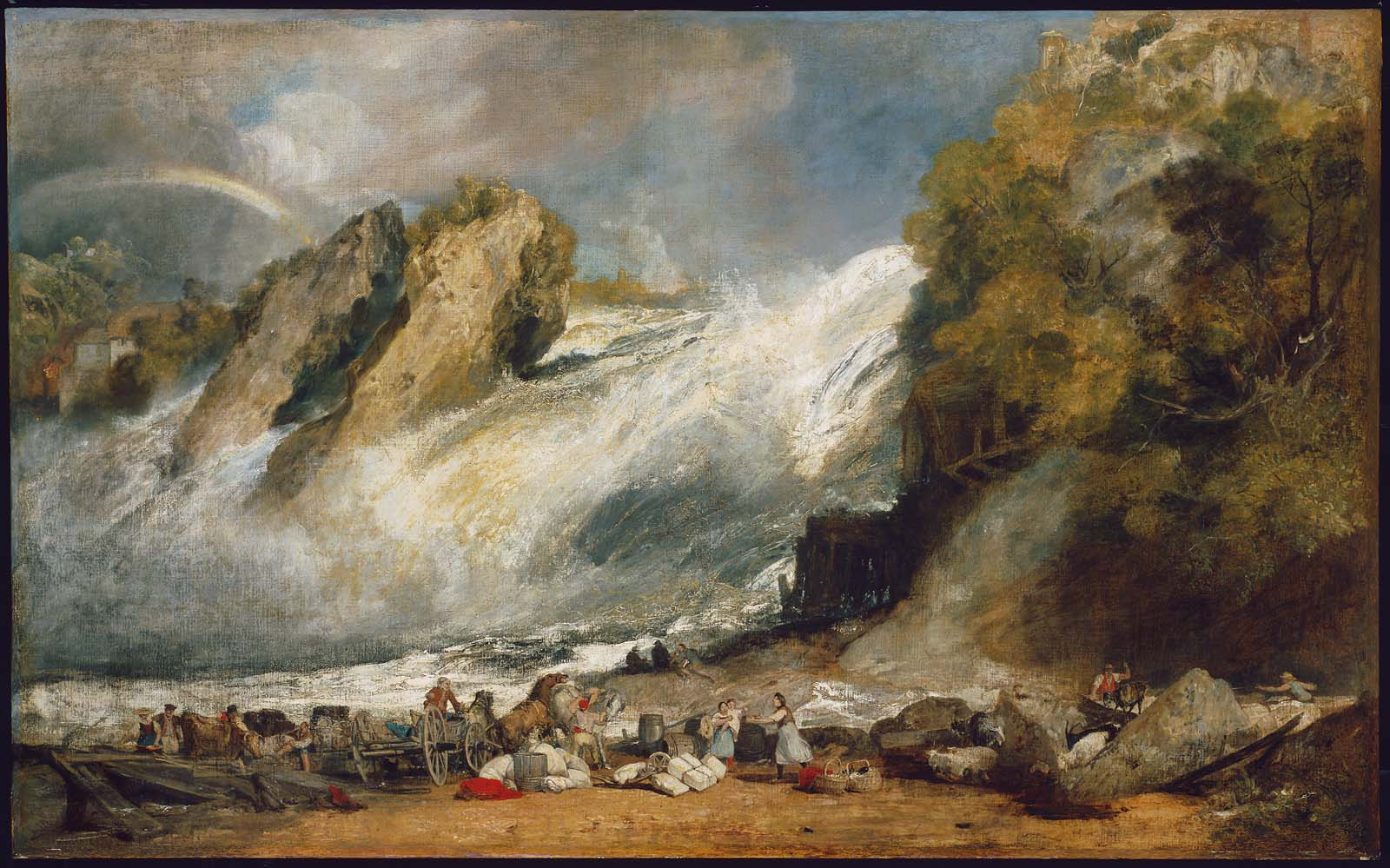
Fall of the Rhine at Schaffhausen by J.M.W. Turner

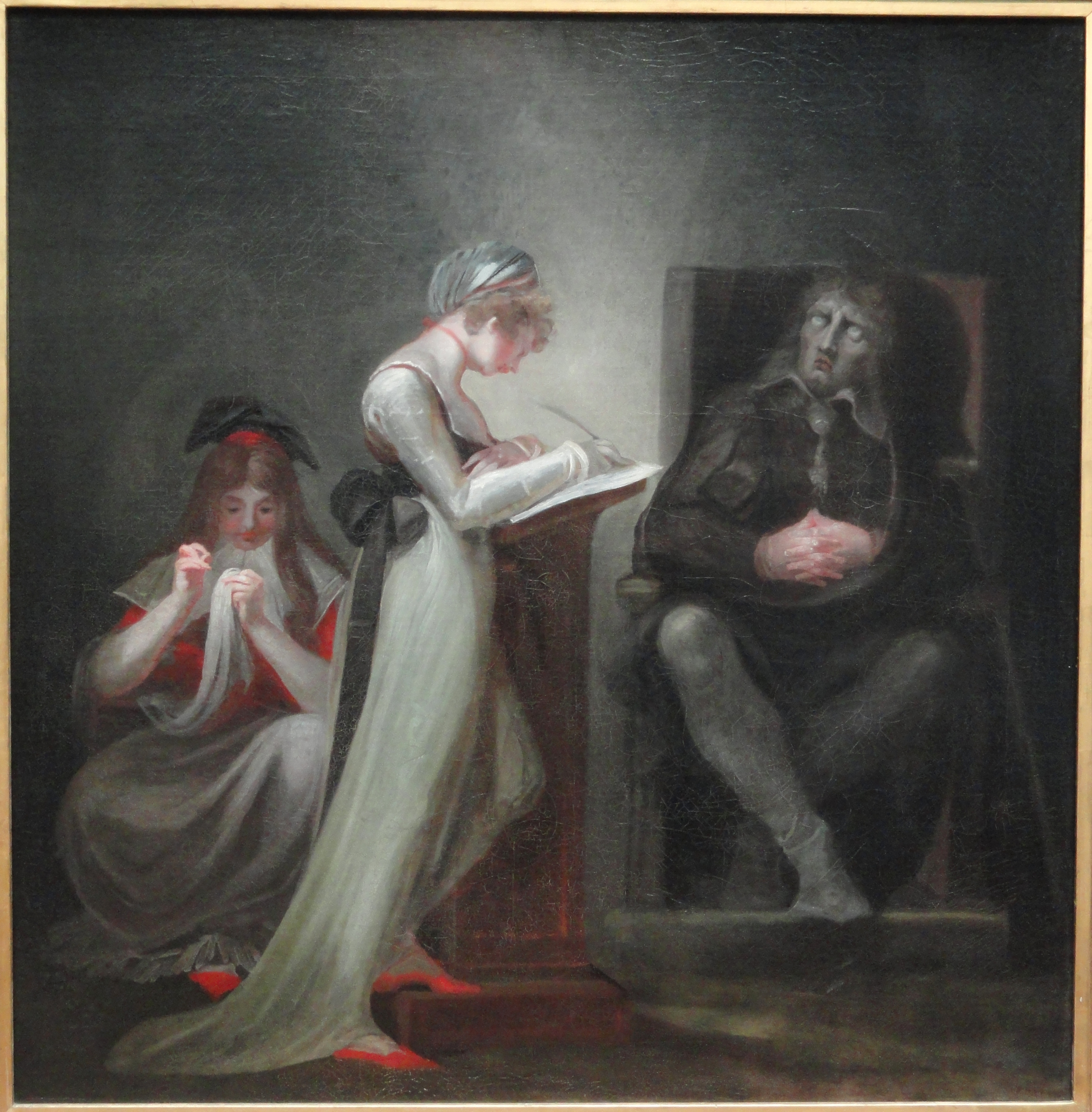
Milton Dictating to His Daughter by Henry Fuseli

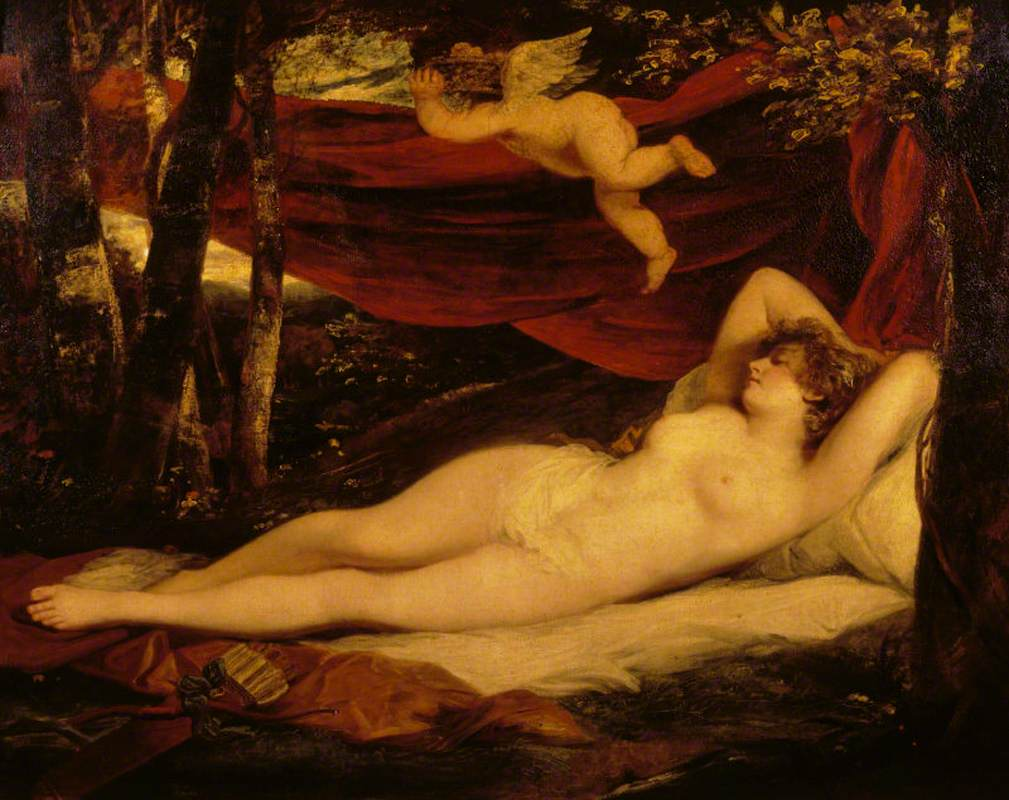
Sleeping Nymph and Cupid by John Hoppner

== Bibliography ==
- Albinson, Cassandra, Funnell, Peter & Peltz, Lucy. Thomas Lawrence: Regency Power and Brilliance. Yale University Press, 2010.
- Bailey, Anthony. J.M.W. Turner: Standing in the Sun. Tate Enterprises Ltd, 2013.
- Levey, Michael. Sir Thomas Lawrence. Yale University Press, 2005.
- Tromans, Nicholas. David Wilkie: The People's Painter. Edinburgh University Press, 2007.
