= Fall of the Rhine at Schaffhausen =

Painting by J.M.W. Turner

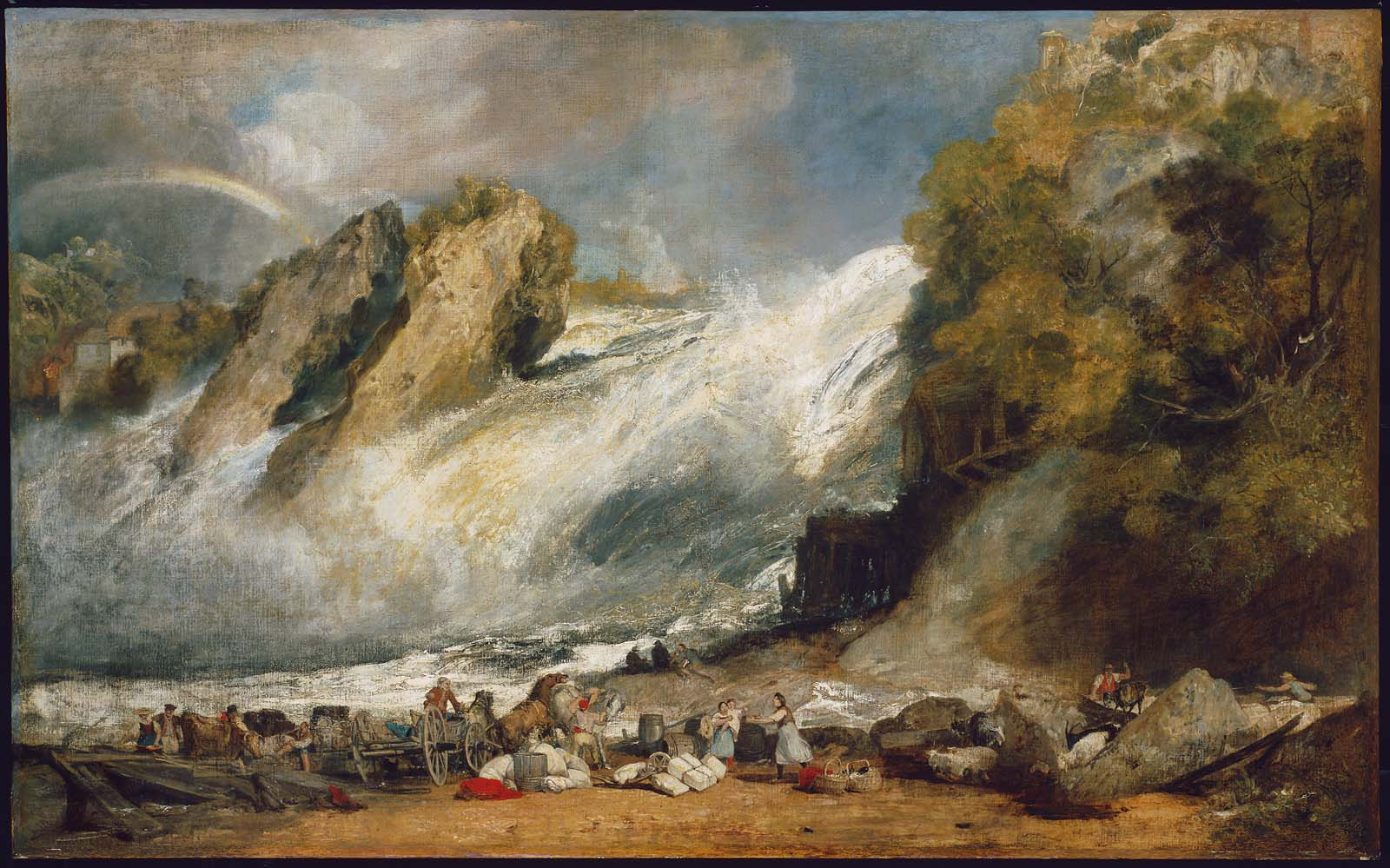
- Artist: J.M.W. Turner
- Year: 1806
- Type: Oil on canvas, landscape painting
- Dimensions: 148.6 cm × 239.7 cm (58.5 in × 94.4 in)
- Location: Museum of Fine Arts, Boston

Fall of the Rhine at Schaffhausen is an 1806 landscape painting by the British artist J.M.W. Turner. It features a view of the Rhine Falls in Neuhausen am Rheinfall, near Schaffhausen, in Switzerland. The painting was based on sketches Turner made during his 1802 visit to the area at the time of the Peace of Amiens. It was displayed at the Royal Academy Exhibition of 1806 at Somerset House in London. Today the painting is in the collection of the Museum of Fine Arts in Boston, Massachusetts, having been acquired in 1913.

== See also ==
- List of paintings by J. M. W. Turner

== Bibliography ==
- Bailey, Anthony. J.M.W. Turner: Standing in the Sun. Tate Enterprises Ltd, 2013.
- Hermann, Luke. British Landscape Painting of the Eighteenth Century. Oxford University Press, 1974.
- Hamilton, James. Turner - A Life. Sceptre, 1998.
- Hill, David. Turner in the Alps: The Journey Through France & Switzerland in 1802. George Philip, 1991.
- Vincent, Patrick. Romanticism, Republicanism, and the Swiss Myth. Cambridge University Press, 2022.
