= Portrait of Joseph Banks (Lawrence) =

Painting by Thomas Lawrence

- Artist: Thomas Lawrence
- Year: 1806
- Type: Oil on canvas, portrait painting
- Dimensions: 127 cm × 101.6 cm (50 in × 40.0 in)
- Location: British Museum, London

Portrait of Joseph Banks is an 1806 portrait painting by the English artist Thomas Lawrence. It depicts the British botanist Joseph Banks, who had served as President of the Royal Society since 1778. He is depicted as an experienced, authoritative figure seated and wearing the Order of the Bath with the ceremonial mace of the Royal Society beside him.

The Bristol-born Lawrence emerged s child prodigy and later became the most celebrated portraitist of the Regency era. In 1820 he was elected as President of the Royal Academy of Arts. He displayed this painting at the Royal Academy Exhibition of 1806 held at Somerset House in London. It is now in the collection of the British Museum, having been donated by Daniel Lysons in 1819. A popular print was produced by the Belgian engraver Antonie Cardon based on Lawrence's work.

== Bibliography ==
- Burnett, Andrew M. & Sloan, Kim. Enlightenment: Discovering the World in the Eighteenth Century. British Museum Press, 2003.
- Goodman, Jordan. Planting the World: Joseph Banks and His Collectors: An Adventurous History of Botany. HarperCollins Publishers, 2020.
- Levey, Michael. Sir Thomas Lawrence. Yale University Press, 2005.
