= Richard Westall =

English painter (1765–1836)

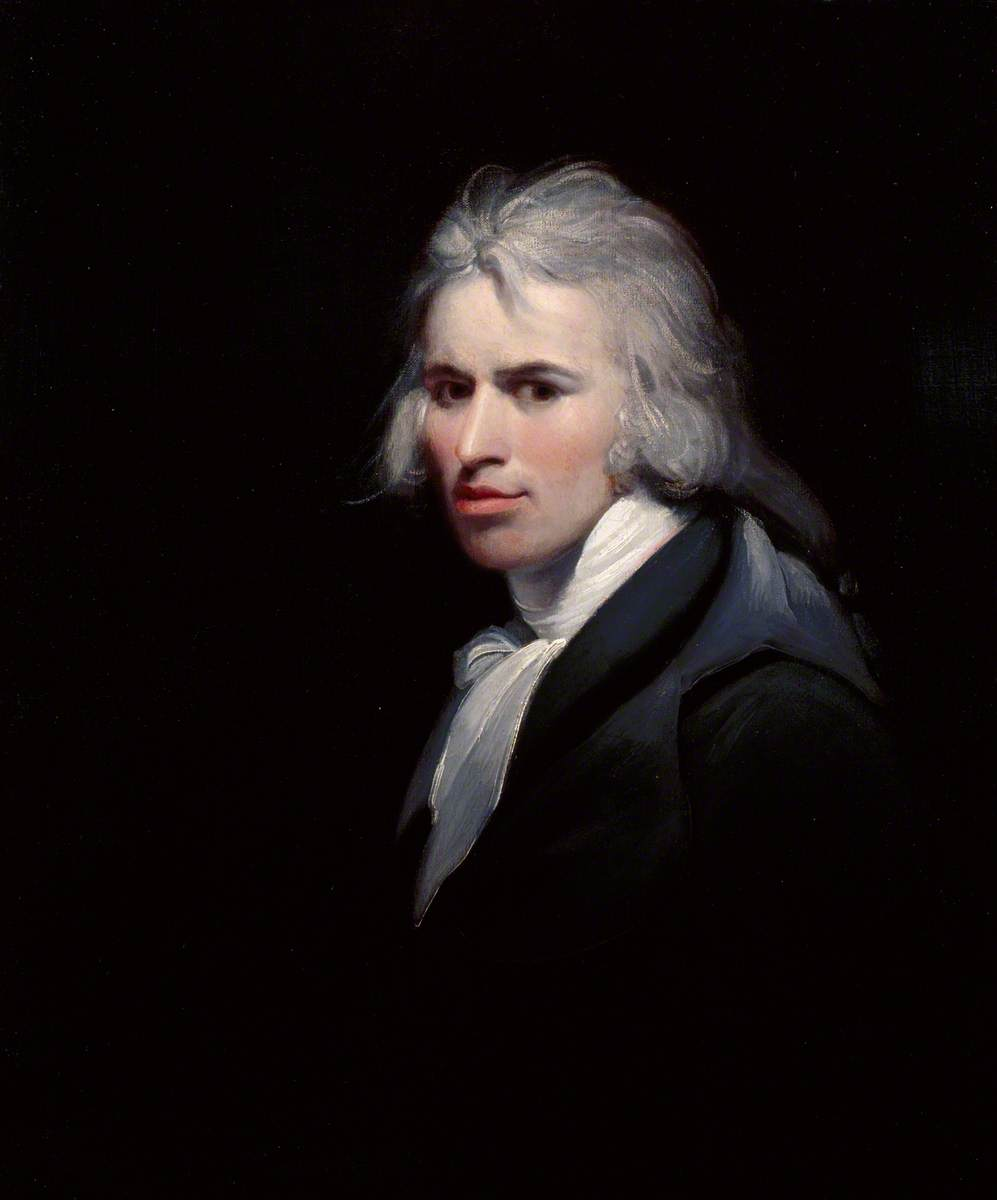
- Self-portrait
- Born: 2 January 1765; Reepham
- Died: 4 December 1836 (aged 71)
- Father: Benjamin Westall
- Relatives: William Westall (brother)

Richard Westall RA (2 January 1765 – 4 December 1836) was an English painter and illustrator of portraits, historical and literary events, today best known for his portraits of Byron. He was also Queen Victoria's drawing master.

His attempts to introduce heroic and patriotic subjects to the English watercolour tradition were a failure even in his own lifetime, after an initial period of success. But his works were widely reproduced as prints.

== Biography ==
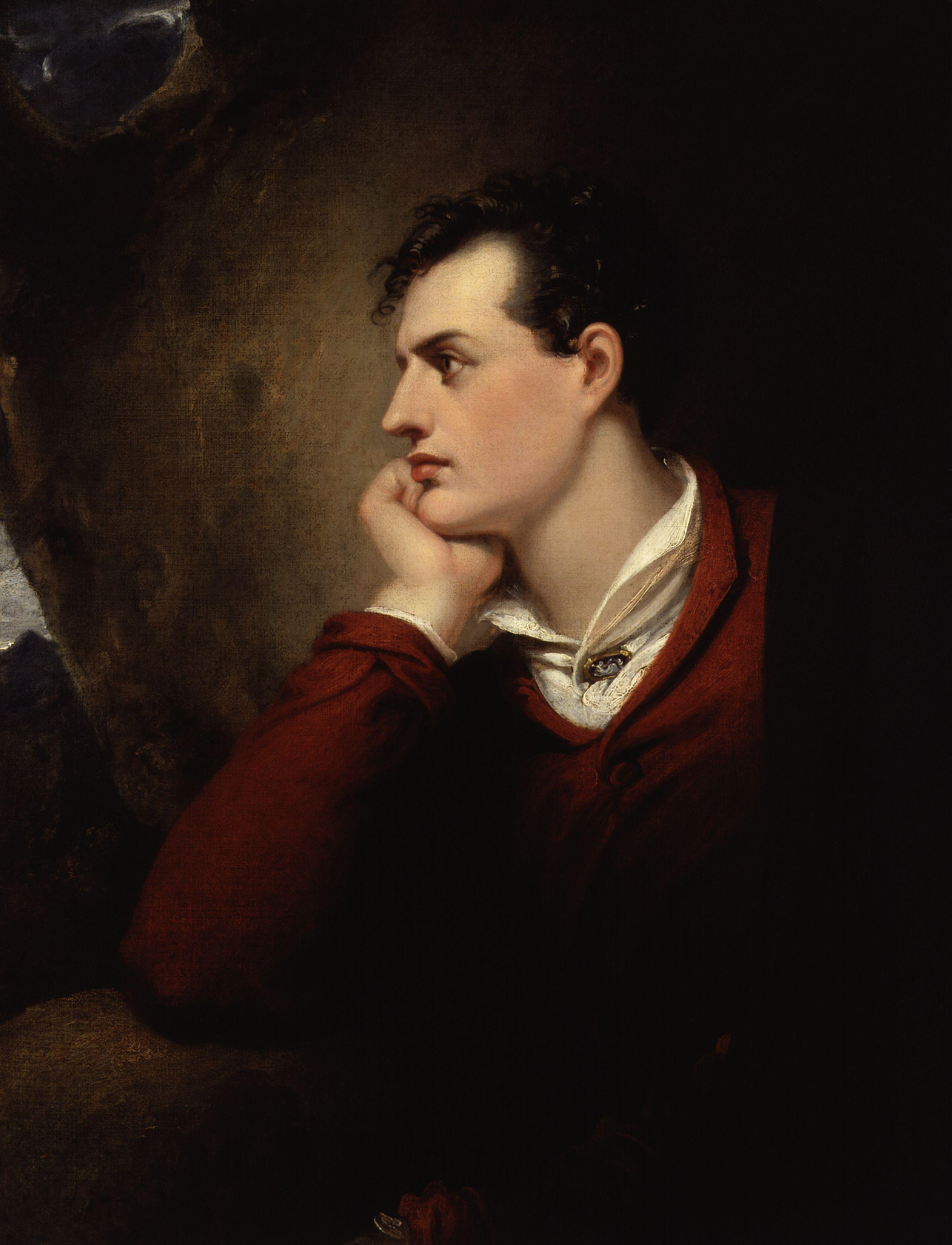
Lord Byron (1813)

Westall was the more successful of two half-brothers (both sons of a Benjamin Westall, from Norwich) who both became painters. His younger half-brother was William Westall (1781–1850), a much-travelled landscape painter.

Born on 2 January 1765 in Reepham near Norwich (where he was baptised at All Saints on 13 January in the same year), Richard Westall moved to London after the death of his mother and the bankruptcy of his father in 1772. Westall was apprenticed to a heraldic silver engraver in 1779, where he was encouraged to become a painter by John Alefounder; he then began studying at the Royal Academy School of Arts from 10 December 1785. He exhibited at the Academy regularly between 1784 and 1836, became an Associate in November 1792 and was elected an Academician on 10 February 1794. From 1790 to 1795 he shared a house with Thomas Lawrence (later Sir), the future Royal Academy president, at 57 Greek Street, on the corner of Soho Square, each of the artists placing their name on one of the entrances.

== Works ==
His works – many in watercolour – caused great interest in the late years of the 18th century when he was considered by his chief patron Richard Payne Knight to be an outstanding artist of the picturesque. He painted works in a neoclassical style for John Boydell's Shakespeare Gallery and for Henry Fuseli's Milton Gallery. His painting of John Milton and his daughters hangs in Sir John Soane's Museum in London. A number of scenes in which Westall depicts events in the life of Horatio Nelson are at the National Maritime Museum.

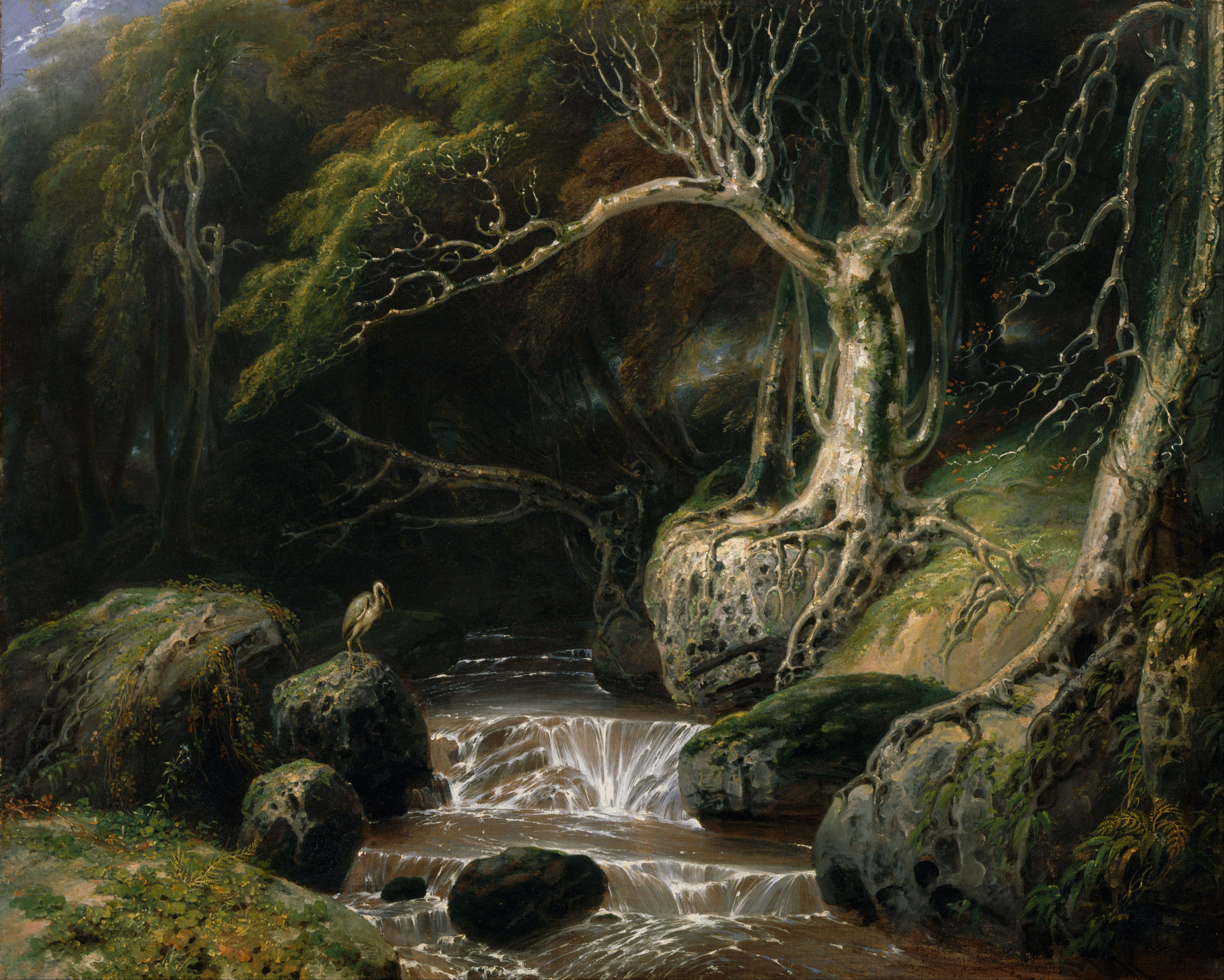
Solitude (1811)

Westall was a prolific book illustrator of both fiction and poetry, including the works of Sir Walter Scott, Oliver Goldsmith, William Cowper and Thomas Gray. Byron, who greatly admired his work, stated that "the brush has beat the poetry". Westall was commissioned to provide illustrations to John Boydell's editions of Shakespeare and John Milton. He also illustrated editions of the Bible, including one with John Martin. His oil painting Christ Crowned with Thorns is the altarpiece at All Souls Church, Langham Place, London.

His portraiture, in a style similar to Lawrence's, included Princess Victoria (later Queen Victoria, for whom he was art teacher for eight years before his death on 4 December 1836), and Richard Ayton, a writer who collaborated with landscape artist William Daniell, who was Westall's brother-in-law. Westall is perhaps best known for several portraits of Lord Byron. One is in the National Portrait Gallery in London, another at Hughenden Manor, and a third in the House of Lords.

His other works are in many UK museums, but will often not be on display.

Richard Westall's works

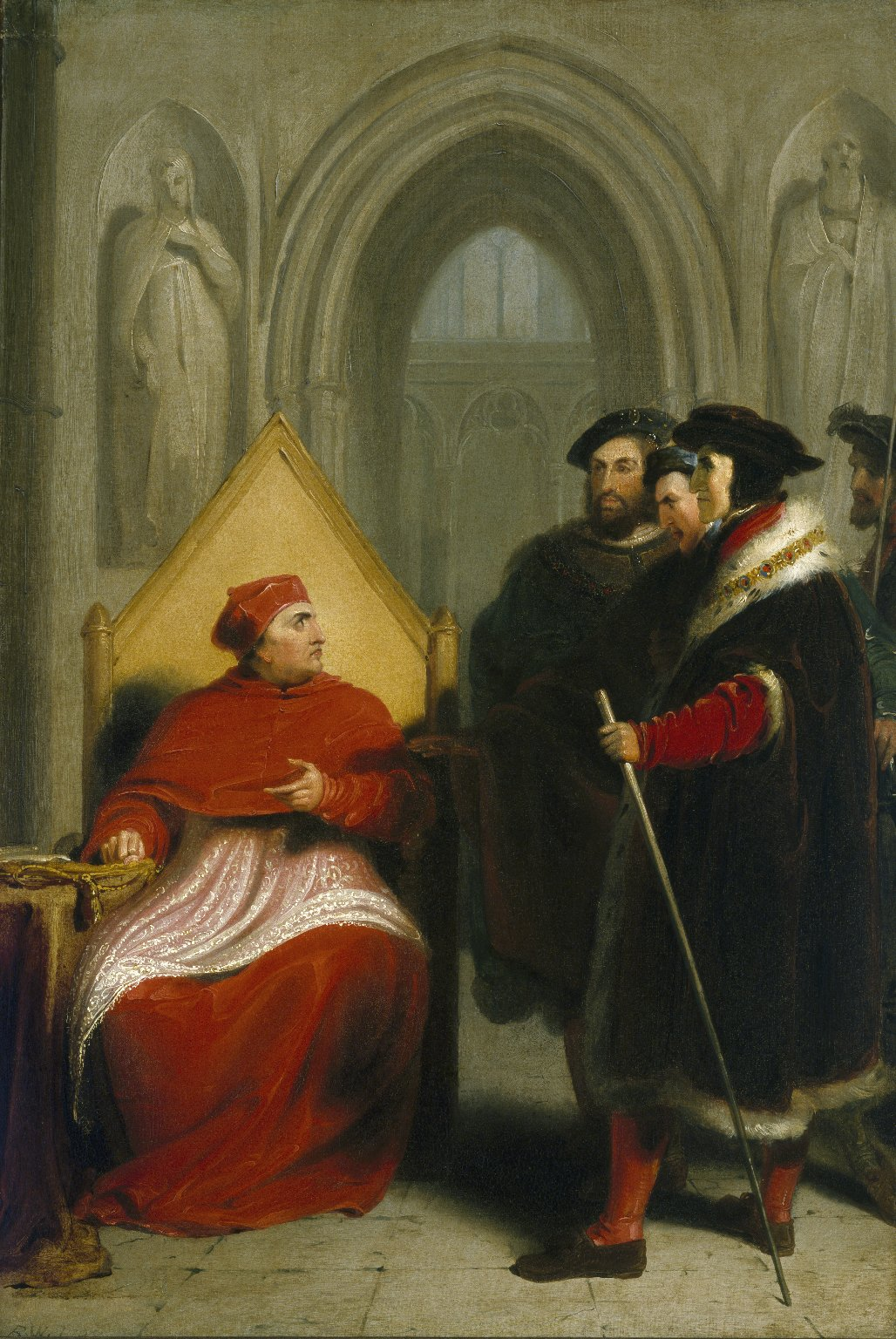
Wolsey disgraced (1795)

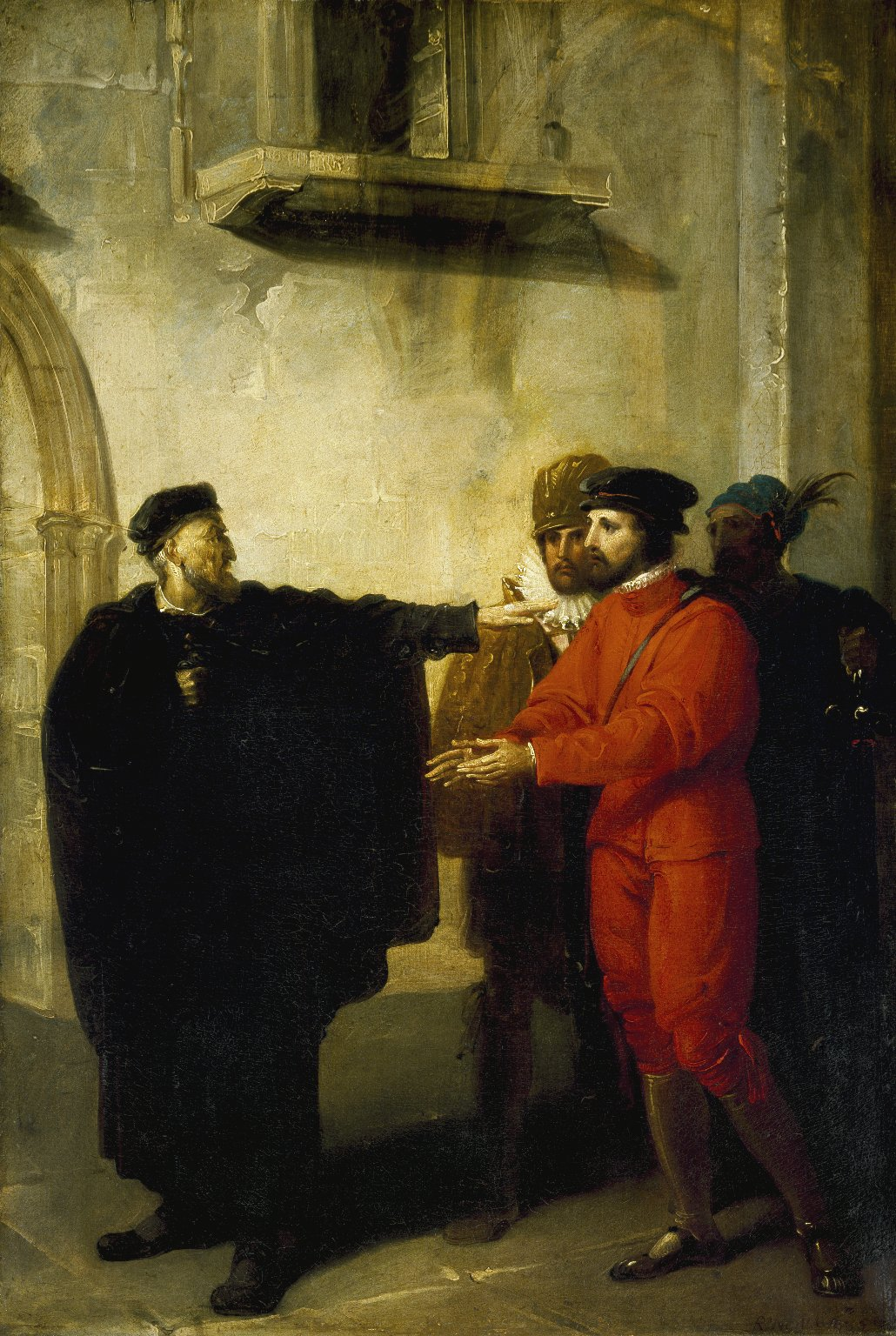
Shylock rebuffing Antonio (1795)

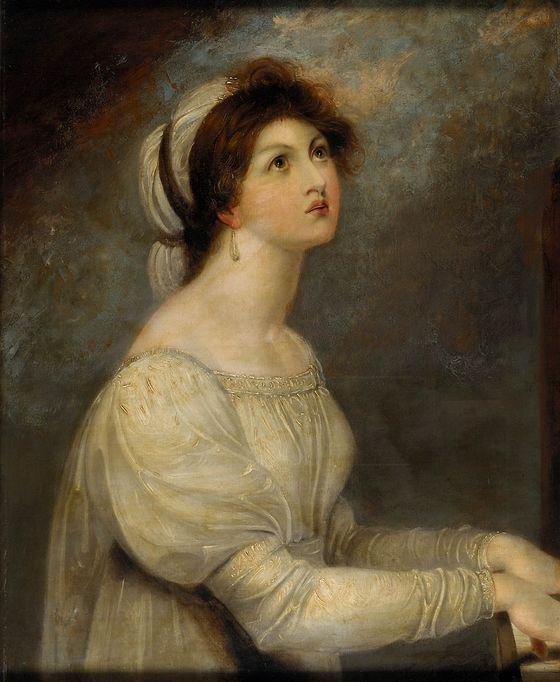
Lady Hamilton as St Ceciliav

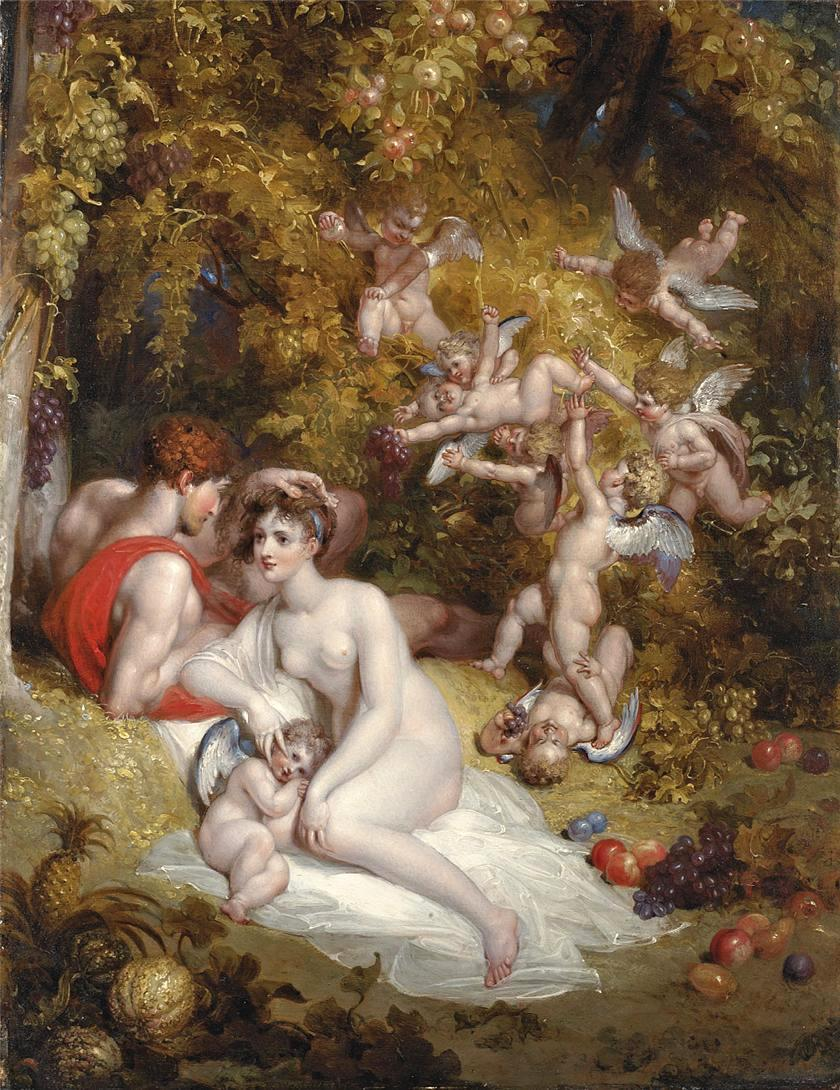
Vertumnus and Pomona

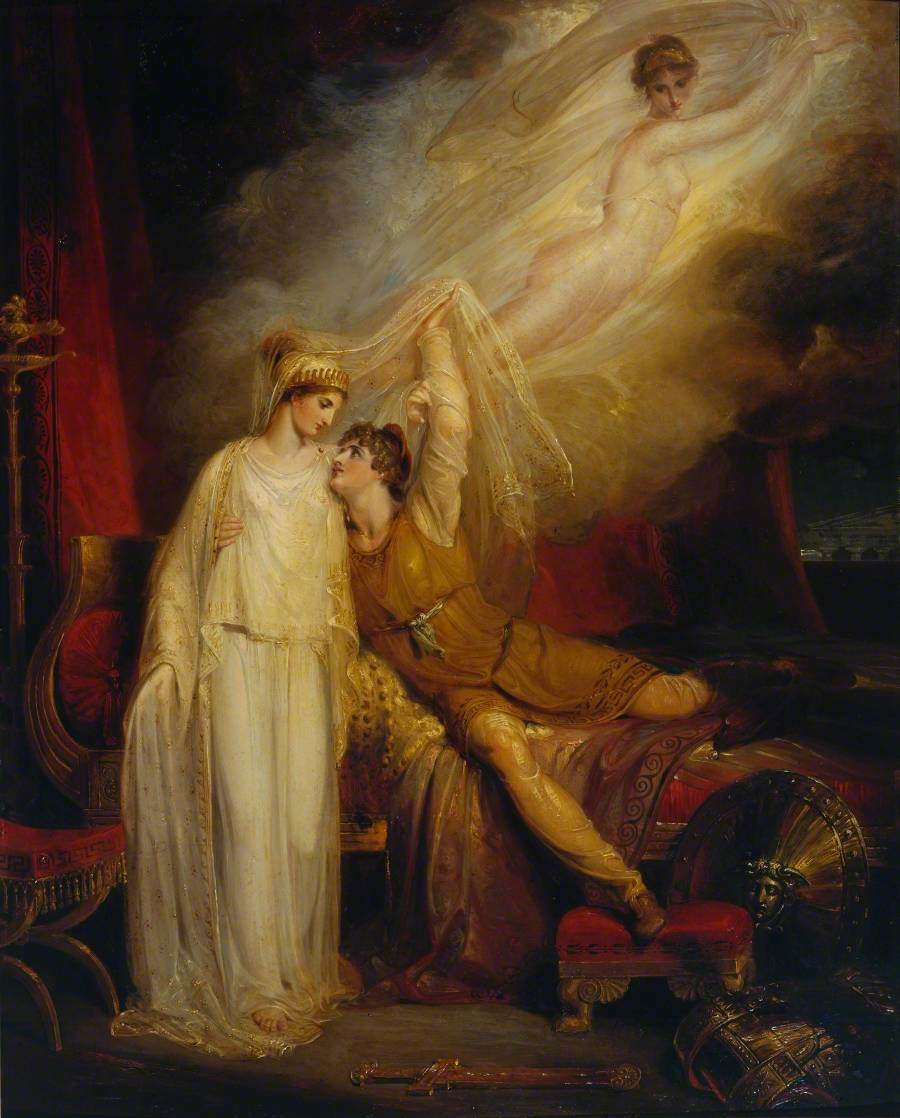
The Reconciliation of Helen and Paris After His Defeat by Menelaus (1805)

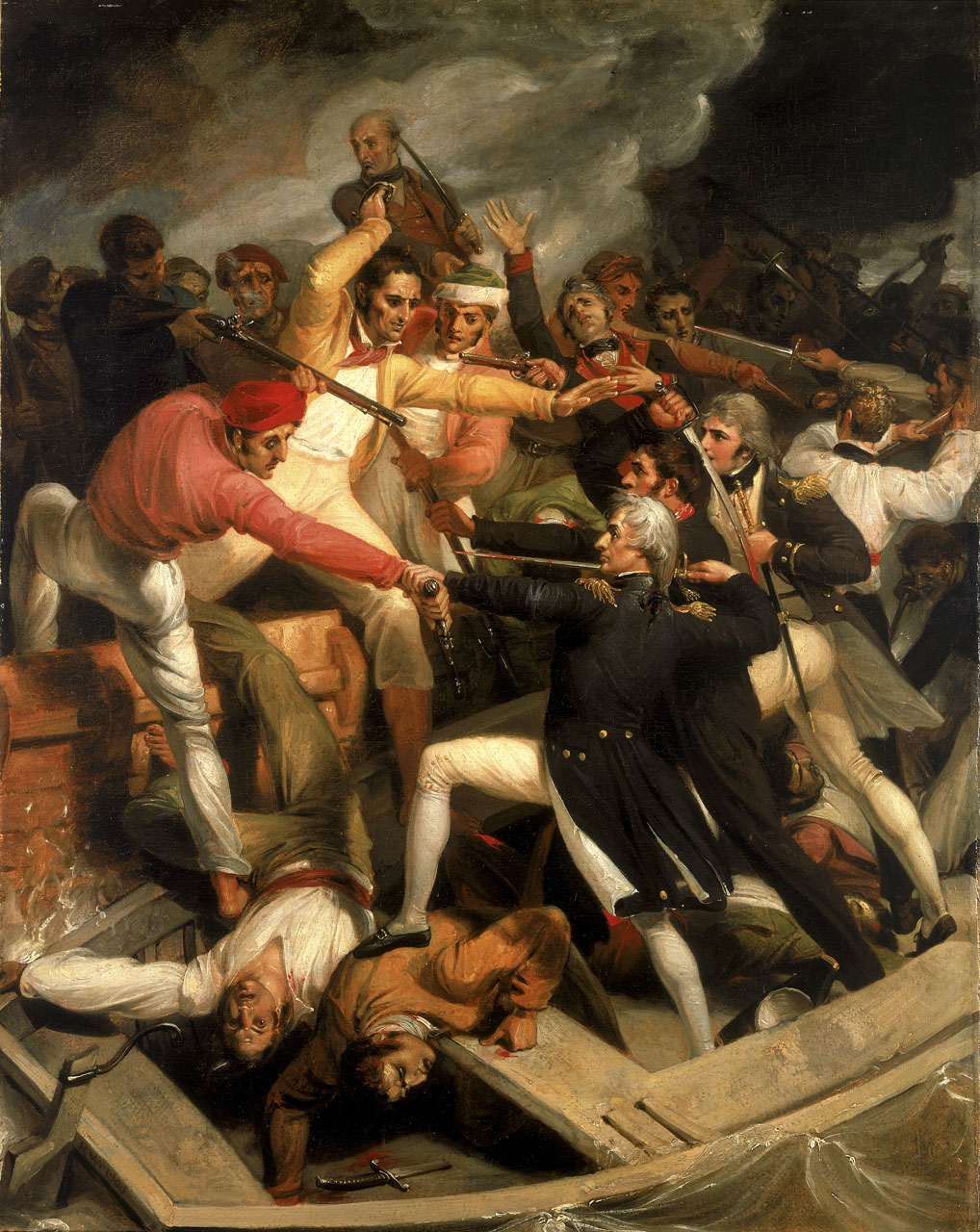
Nelson in conflict with a Spanish launch, 3 July 1797 (1806)

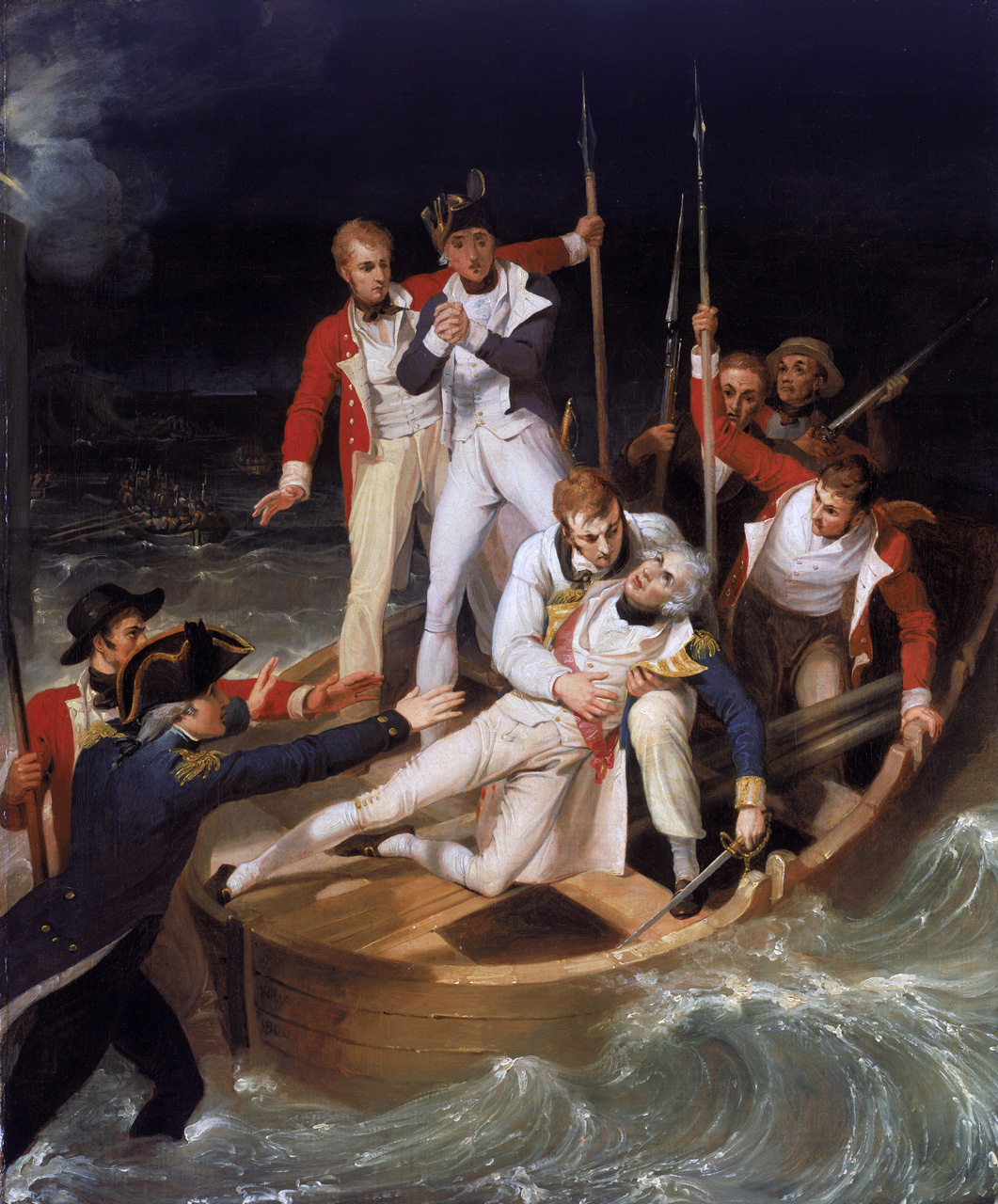
Nelson wounded at Tenerife, 24 July 1797 (1806)

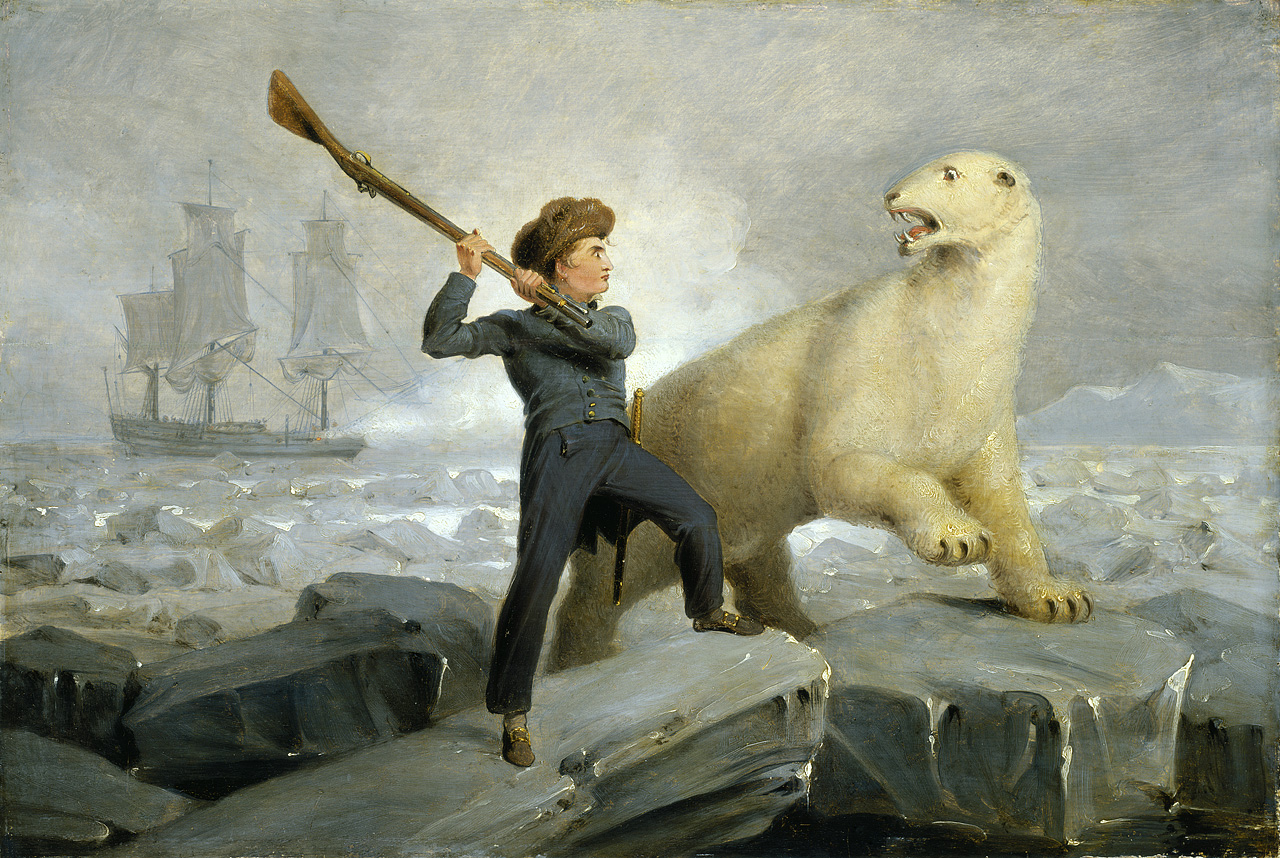
Nelson and the Bear (1809)

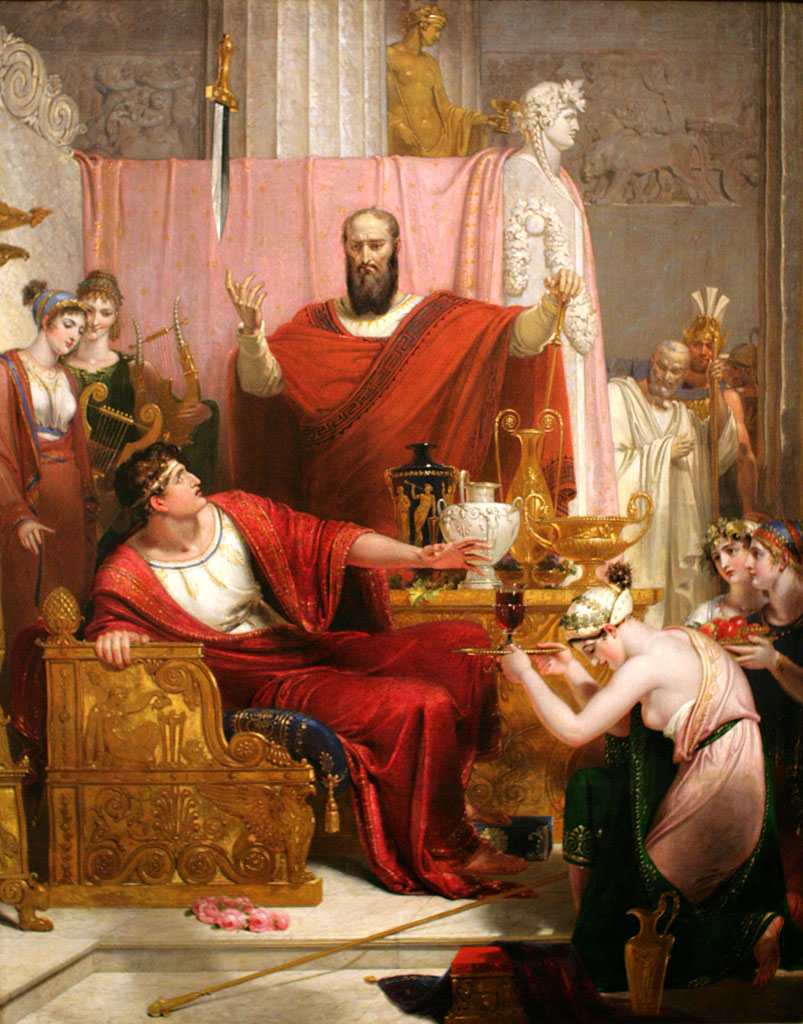
The Sword of Damocles (1812)

== Sources ==
- Marina Warner,. Queen Victoria's Sketchbook, Macmillan, 1979.
- John Ramm, Forgotten Pioneer, Antique Dealer & Collectors Guide, Nov 1998, Volume 53, No. 4
- Richard J. Westall, Oxford Dictionary of National Biography, 2004
