= Portrait of Lady Elizabeth Foster =

1805 painting by Thomas Lawrence

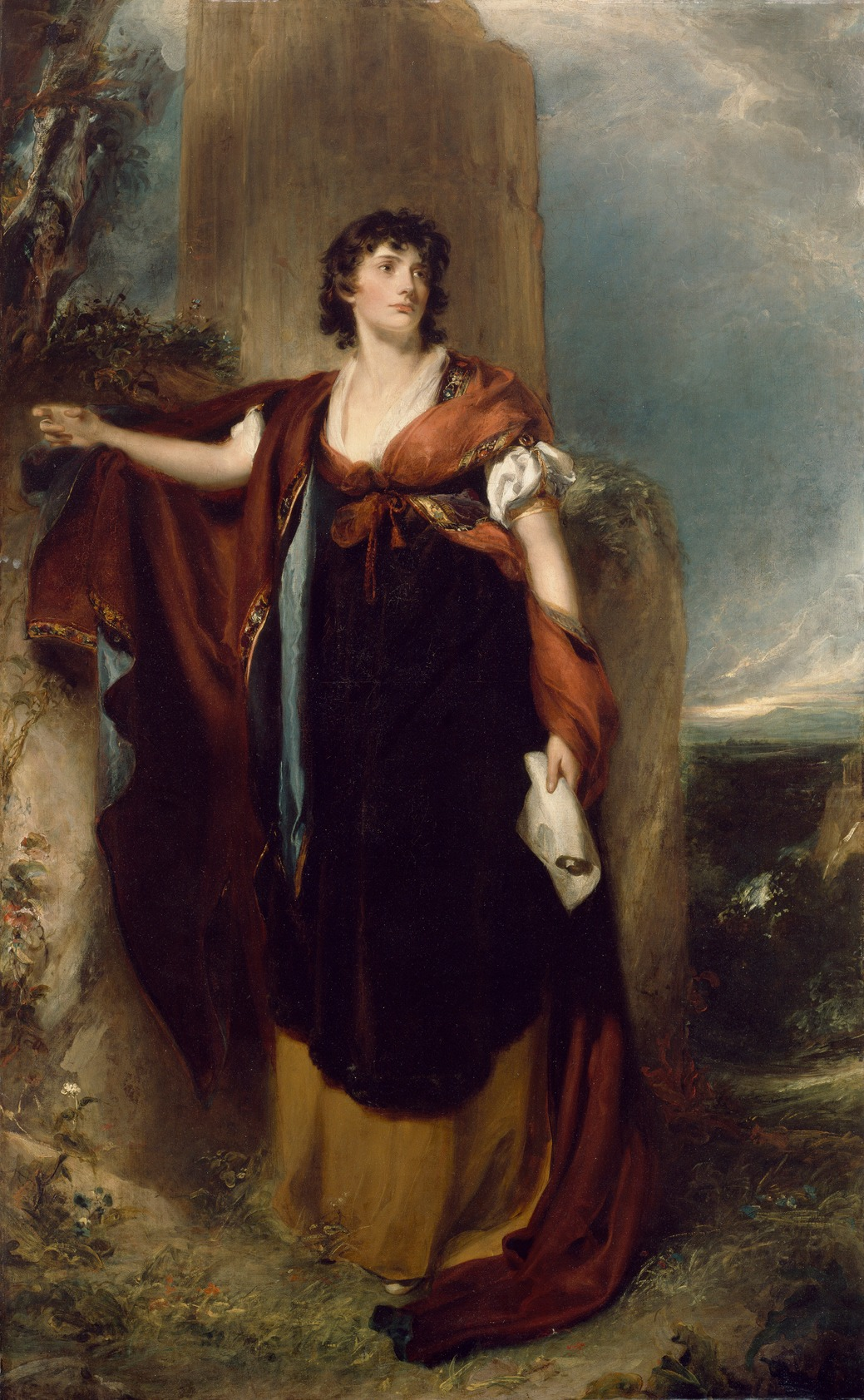
- Artist: Thomas Lawrence
- Year: 1805
- Type: Oil on canvas, portrait painting
- Dimensions: 240 cm × 148 cm (94 in × 58 in)
- Location: National Gallery of Ireland; Dublin

Portrait of Lady Elizabeth Foster is an oil on canvas portrait painting by the British artist Thomas Lawrence, from 1805. It depicts the English aristocrat and writer Lady Elizabeth Foster. Lawrence depicts her at full-length in fashionable early Regency style as the Tiburtine Sibyl of Classical Rome. Stood by a column in declamatory pose she looks younger than her forty six years.

Foster had married the Irish aristocrat John Thomas Foster, but the couple separated in 1781 after five years of marriage. She was in a long-term relationship with Duke of Devonshire while he was married to Georgiana Cavendish, Duchess of Devonshire. More than decade later in 1819 , by now herself the widowed Duchess of Devonshire and a long-term resident of Rome, she was able to facilitate Lawrence's access to paint his Portrait of Pope Pius VII and another of his advisor Cardinal Ercole Consalvi. These works were part of a large commission by the Prince Regent and are now in the Waterloo Chamber at Windsor Castle. It was likely in Rome that Lawrence produced a chalk and pencil portrait of the Duchess.

The work was displayed at the Royal Academy's Summer Exhibition of 1805 at Somerset House. The painting is today in the collection of Irish National Gallery in Dublin, having been acquired in 1916

== Bibliography ==
- Crow, Thomas. Restoration: The Fall of Napoleon in the Course of European Art, 1812-1820. Princeton University Press, 2023.
- Levey, Michael. Sir Thomas Lawrence. National Portrait Gallery, 1979
