= The Reconciliation of Helen and Paris After His Defeat by Menelaus =

Painting by Richard Westall

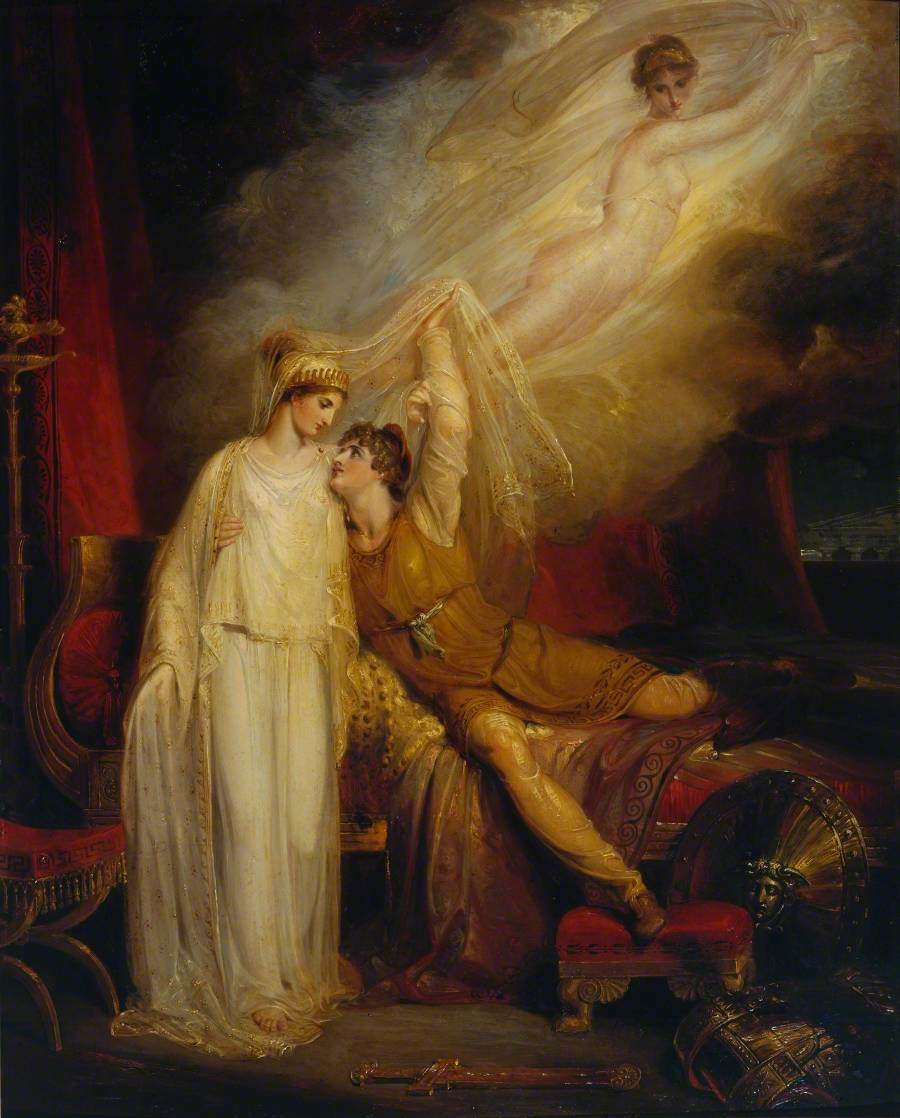
- Artist: Richard Westall
- Year: 1805
- Type: Oil on wood, history painting
- Dimensions: 101 cm × 127 cm (40 in × 50 in)
- Location: Tate Britain, London

The Reconciliation of Helen and Paris After His Defeat by Menelaus is an 1805 history painting by the British artist Richard Westall. It depicts a scene from the poem the Iliad by the Ancient Greek writer Homer. Following her lover Paris's defeat in the Trojan Wars at the hands of her husband Menelaus, King of Sparta, Helen is reconciled with him thanks to the intervention of Aphrodite.

It was displayed at the Royal Academy's 1805 Summer Exhibition at Somerset House. It was one of two paintings commissioned by the art collector Thomas Hope, with Helen being modelled on a statue in his collection. Hope was a close friend of another of Westall's major patrons Richard Payne Knight who owned nine of his paintings. Today it is in the collection of the Tate Britain in Pimlico, having been acquired in 1956.

== Bibliography ==
- Clarke, Michael & Penny, Nicholas. The Arrogant Connoisseur: Richard Payne Knight, 1751-1824. Manchester University Press, 1982.
- Flaum, Eric & Pandy, David. The Encyclopedia of Mythology. Courage Books, 1993.
- Waywell, Geoofrey B. The Lever and Hope Sculptures. Mann, 1986.
