= Samuel Forde =

Irish painter

Samuel Forde (1805–1828), was an Irish painter.

== Early life ==
Forde, born at Cork on 5 April 1805, was the second son of Samuel Forde, a tradesman, who became involved in difficulties and went to America, deserting his family. The elder brother was a talented musician, and was able to earn sufficient to send young Samuel to school, where he learnt Latin and French. A friend, Mr. Aungier, taught him Latin, and he learnt Greek by his own perseverance. Forde very soon displayed a talent for art, and his taste for literature helped to nourish and foster the high aspirations which distinguished, even in his schoolboy days, the numerous sketches on which he employed himself.

== Art career ==
He became a student in the Cork Academy, drawing from the collection of casts which Lord Listowel had obtained for that institution. The master, Chalmers, was also a scene painter, and taught Forde distemper painting, so that he was able to be employed at the theatre. He had an intention of becoming a mezzotint engraver, and taught himself the art with materials roughly made by his own hands, but soon relinquished any further practice, becoming an art teacher, and subsequently master in the Cork Mechanics' Institute.

Among his fellow-students and intimate friends was Daniel Maclise. As well as Maclise, Forde's contemporaries include John Hogan and George Petrie. Up to about twenty years of age, Forde was principally engaged on works of a decorative character painted in distemper. In 1826 he was able to execute works of his own invention, and give expression to the grand projects which his poetical mind conceived. His first picture was the Vision of Tragedy, the idea taken from John Milton, which was painted in distemper, in grey and white. A cartoon for this subject was in the possession of Mr. Justice Willes, and was presented by his nephew to the South Kensington Museum. Forde was continually occupied in projecting pictures of an ambitious nature. In November 1827 he painted in two days a Crucifixion for the chapel of Skibbereen. In October 1827 his lungs first became affected.

== Death ==
Early in 1828 he commenced a large picture of the Fall of the Rebel Angels, but although he was able to dispose of the picture, he was not destined to complete it. He slowly sank under the increase of his consumptive symptoms, and died on 29 June 1828, at the age of twenty-three. He was buried in St. Finn Barr's churchyard at Cork.
