= The Evening Coach =

Painting by Philip James de Loutherbourg

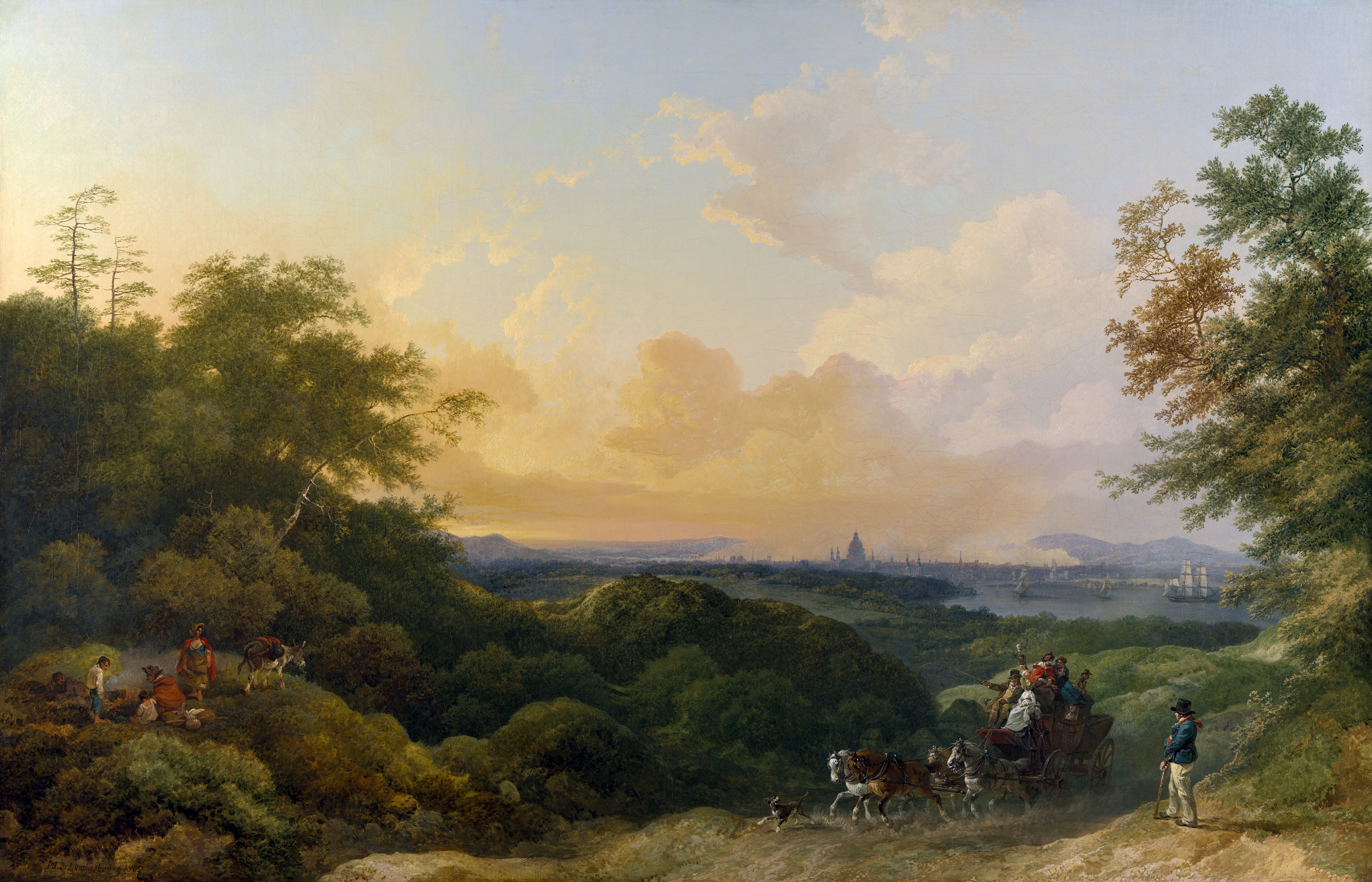
- Artist: Philip James de Loutherbourg
- Year: 1805
- Type: Oil on canvas, landscape painting
- Dimensions: 74.9 cm × 116.8 cm (29.5 in × 46.0 in)
- Location: Yale Center for British Art, New Haven

The Evening Coach, London in the Distance is an 1805 landscape painting by the French-born British-based artist Philippe-Jacques de Loutherbourg. It depicts a view of the English countryside with the River Thames and the City of London in the distance. Stylistically it foreshadows some of the later Hampstead landscapes of John Constable. The painting was displayed at the Royal Academy's Summer Exhibition of 1806 at Somerset House in London. Today it is in the Yale Center for British Art, in New Haven, as part of the Paul Mellon Collection.

== Bibliography ==
- Hermann, Luke. British Landscape Painting of the Eighteenth Century. Oxford University Press, 1974.
- Preston, Lillian Elvira. Philippe Jacques de Loutherbourg: Eighteenth Century Romantic Artist and Scene Designer. University of Florida, 1977.
