= 1795–1820 in Western fashion =

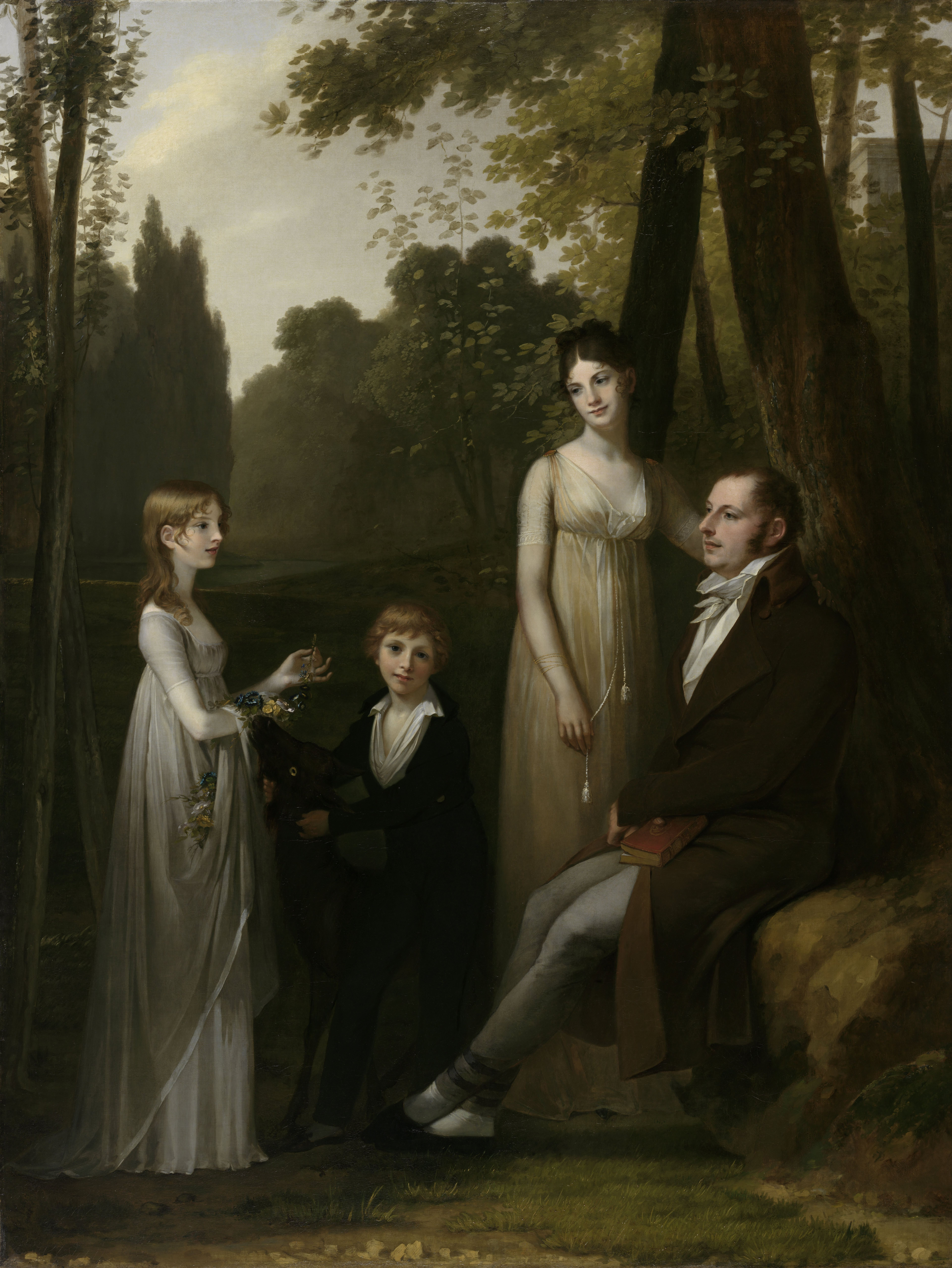
In the early 1800s, women wore thin gauzy outer dresses while men adopted trousers and overcoats. Rutger Jan Schimmelpenninck and his family, 1801–02, by Pierre-Paul Prud'hon

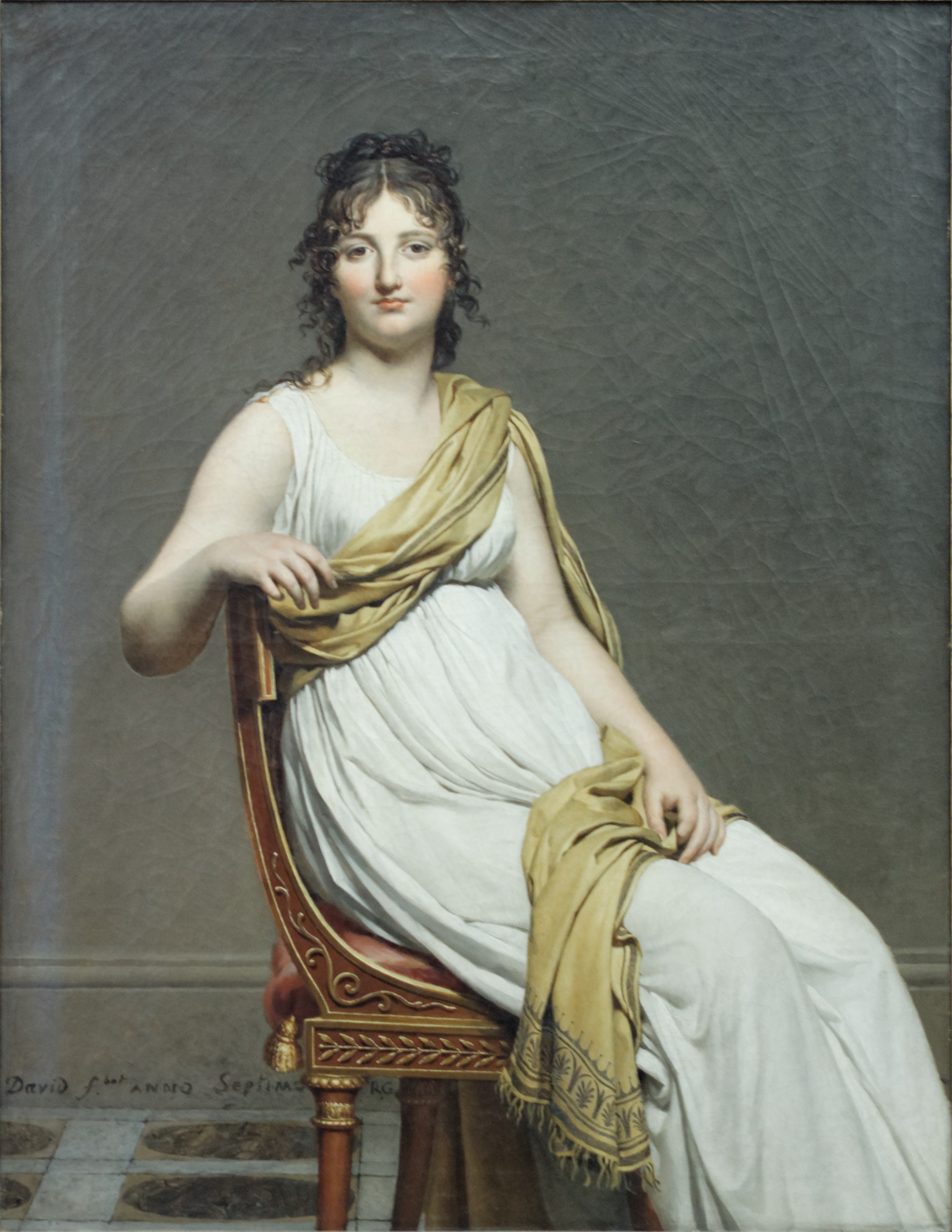
Madame Raymond de Verninac by Jacques-Louis David, with clothes and chair in Directoire style. "Year 7", that is 1798–99.

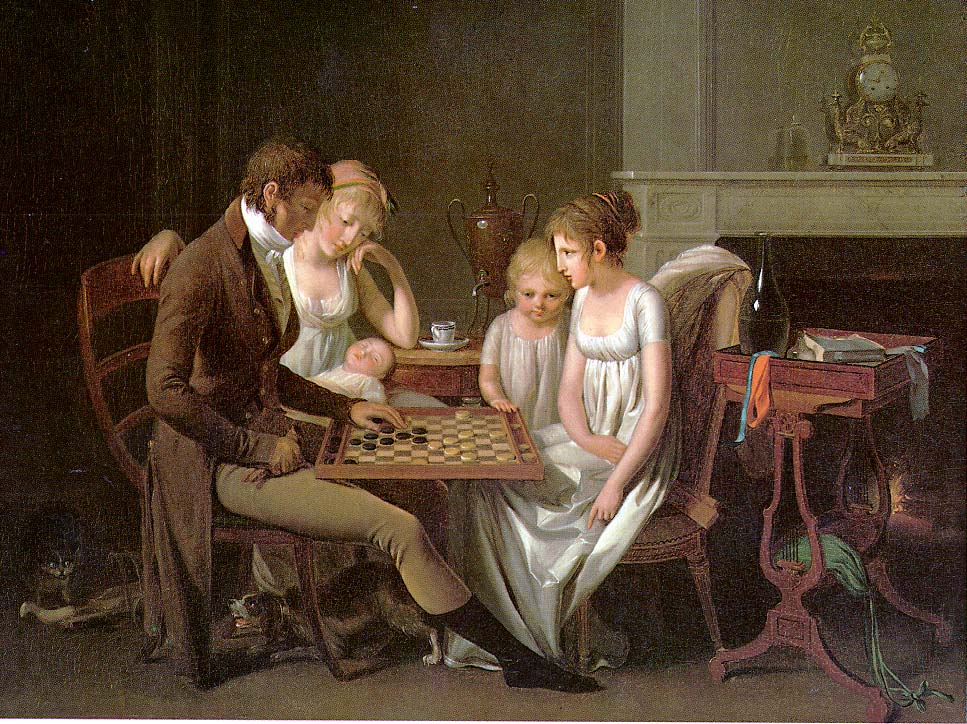
Painting of a family game of checkers ("jeu de dames") by French artist Louis-Léopold Boilly, c. 1803.

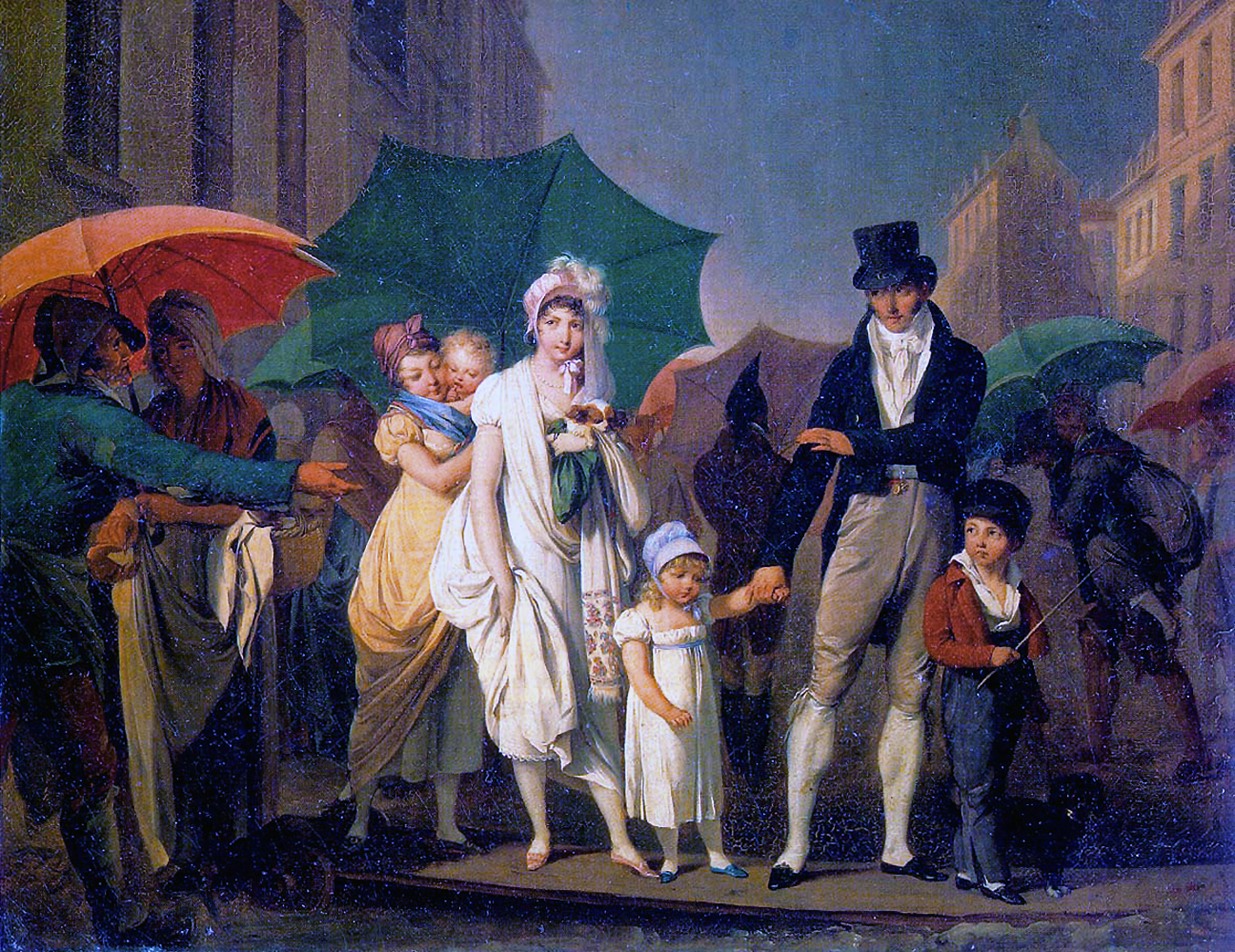
A well-to-do family edges cautiously along a plank to avoid the muddy streets of Paris, by Boilly, 1803

Fashion in the period 1795–1820 in European and European-influenced countries saw the final triumph of undress or informal styles over the brocades, lace, periwigs and powder of the earlier 18th century. In the aftermath of the French Revolution, no one wanted to appear to be a member of the French aristocracy, and people began using clothing more as a form of individual expression than as a pure indication of social status. As a result, the shifts that occurred in fashion at the turn of the 19th century granted the opportunity to present new public identities that also provided insights into their private selves. Katherine Aaslestad indicates how "fashion, embodying new social values, emerged as a key site of confrontation between tradition and change."

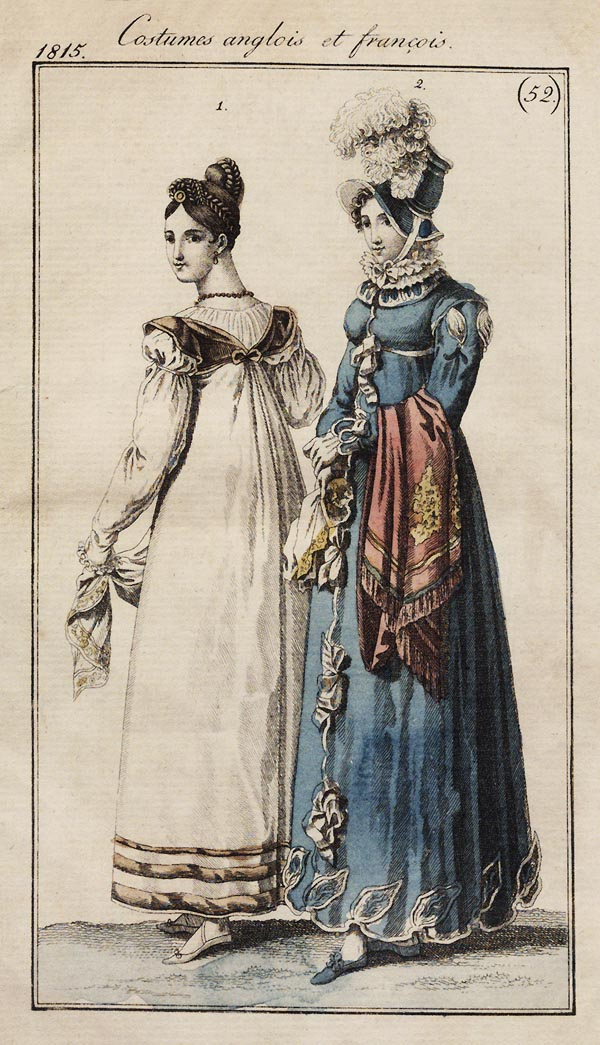
English (1) and French (2) fashions, 1815. The morning dress has back gathers and long sleeves, and like the walking costume, has trim at the hemline and new detail at the upper sleeve.

For women's dress, day-to-day outfits were practical and relatively simple. Women's fashions followed classical ideals, and stiffly boned stays were abandoned in favor of softer, less boned corsets. Over the gown, for warmth, shawls were more common than the high, tight, jackets. This natural figure was emphasized by being able to see the body beneath the clothing. Visible breasts were part of this classical look, and some characterized the breasts in fashion as solely aesthetic and sexual.

This era of British history is known as the Regency period, marked by the regency between the reigns of George III and George IV. But the broadest definition of the period, characterized by trends in fashion, architecture, culture, and politics, begins with the French Revolution of 1789 and ends with Queen Victoria's 1837 accession. The names of popular people who lived in this time are still famous: Napoleon and Josephine, Ludwig van Beethoven, Juliette Récamier, Jane Austen, Johann Wolfgang Von Goethe, Percy Bysshe Shelley, Lord Byron, Beau Brummell, Lady Emma Hamilton, Queen Louise of Prussia and her husband Frederick William III, and many more. Beau Brummell introduced trousers, perfect tailoring, and unadorned, immaculate linen as the ideals of men's fashion.

In Germany, republican city-states relinquished their traditional, modest, and practical garments and started to embrace the French and English fashion trends of short-sleeved chemise dresses and Spencer jackets. American fashion trends emulated French dress, but in a toned-down manner, with shawls and tunics to cope with the sheerness of the chemise. Spanish majos, however, rebelled against foppish French Enlightenment ideals by reclaiming and elaborating upon traditional Spanish dress.

By the end of the eighteenth century, a major shift in fashion was taking place that extended beyond changes in mere style to changes in philosophical and social ideals. Prior to this time, the style and traditions of the Ancien Régime prevented the conceptualization of "the self". Instead, one's identity was considered malleable; subject to change depending on what clothes one was wearing. However, by the 1780s, the new, "natural" style allowed one's inner self to transcend their clothes.

During the 1790s, there was a new concept of the internal and external self. Before this time, there had only been one self, which was expressed through clothing. When going to a masquerade ball, people wore specific clothing, so they could not show their individuality through their clothing. Incorporated in this new "natural" style was the importance of ease and comfort of one's dress. Not only was there a new emphasis on hygiene, but also clothing became much lighter and more able to be changed and washed frequently. Even upper-class women began wearing cropped dresses as opposed to dresses with long trains or hoops that restricted them from leaving their homes. The subsequent near stasis of the silhouette inspired volumes of new trims and details on heavily trimmed skirts back into fashion. In the Regency years, complicated historic and orientalist elements provided lavish stylistic displays as such details were a vigorous vehicle for conspicuous consumption given their labor-intensive fabrications, and therefore a potent signifier of hierarchy for the upper classes who wore the styles. This kind of statement was particularly noticeable in profuse trimmings, especially on skirts where unrestrained details were common, along with cut edge details and edge trims.

Women's fashion was also influenced by male fashion, such as tailored waistcoats and jackets to emphasize women's mobility. This new movement toward practicality of dress showed that dress became less of a way to solely categorize between classes or genders; dress was meant to suit one's personal daily routine. It was also during this time period that the fashion magazine and journal industry began to take off. They were most often monthly (often competing) periodicals that allowed men and women to keep up with the ever-changing styles.

== Influence of the Industrial Revolution ==
In the late 18th century, clothes were mostly sold by individual shopkeepers who were often the artisans who made the goods. Customers usually lived in the same neighborhood as the shops and the shops would gain popularity by their customers' word-of–mouth recommendation, with the exception of warehouses (i.e., any retail on wholesale), where goods being sold were not necessarily made in the shop. However, things started to change during the transition to the 19th century. People sought efficiency and variety; under the influence of the Industrial Revolution, improved transportation and introduction of machines in manufacturing allowed fashion to develop at an even faster pace.

The first sewing machine emerged in 1790, and later, Josef Madersperger began developing his first sewing machine in 1807, presenting his first working machine in 1814. The introduction of the sewing machine sped up garment production. However, it had no widespread social impact until the 1840s, and clothing was entirely made by hand in the period to 1820. Meanwhile, advanced spinning, weaving and cotton-printing techniques developed in the 18th century had already brought cheaper, widely available washable fabrics. These durable and affordable fabrics became popular among the larger population. These techniques were further developed by the introduction of machines. Before, accessories like embroidery and lace were manufactured on a small and limited scale by skilled craftsmen and sold in their own shops; in 1804, a machine for embroidering was constructed by John Duncan, and people started producing these essential accessories in factories and dispatching the products to shops throughout the country. These technical developments in clothing production allowed a greater variety of styles; rapid changes in fashion also became possible.

The Industrial Revolution bridged Europe and America with regards to travel. When Louis Simond first arrived in America, he was struck by the mobility of the population and frequency of people made trips to the capital, writing "you meet nowhere with those persons who never were out of their native place, and whose habits are wholly local — nobody above poverty who has not visited London once in his life; and most of those who can, visit once a year.' New canals and railways not only transported people, but created national and even broader markets by transporting goods manufactured in factories at great distances. The rise of industry throughout the Western world increased garment production and people were encouraged to travel more widely and purchase more goods than ever before.

Communication was also improved in this era. New ideas about fashion were conveyed by little dolls dressed in the latest style, newspapers, and illustrated magazines; for example, La Belle Assemblée, founded by John Bell, was a British women's magazine published from 1806 to 1837. It was known for its fashion plates of contemporary fashions, demonstrating ways for women to dress and create ensembles.

== Changes in fashion ==
1790s:

- Women: "age of undress"; dressing like statues coming to life; Greek fashion started to inspire the current fashion, and fillet-Greek classical hairstyles and high waisted clothing with a more triangular hem started to find its way; pastel fabrics; natural makeup; bare arms; blonde wigs; accessorized with: hats, Draped turban, gloves, jewelry, small handbags – reticules, shawls, handkerchiefs; parasols; fans; Maja: layered skirt
- Men: trousers with perfect tailoring; linen; coats cutaway in the front with long tails; cloaks; hats; the Dandy; Majo: short jacket

1800s:

- Women: short hair; white hats; trim, feathers, lace; Egyptian and Eastern influences in jewelry and apparel; shawls; hooded-overcoats; hair: masses of curls, sometimes pulled back into a bun
- Men: linen shirts w. high collars; tall hats; hair: short and wigless, à la Titus or Bedford Crop, but often with some long locks left coming down

1810s:

- Women: soft, subtle, sheer classical drapes; raised back waist of high-waisted dresses; short-fitted single-breasted jackets; morning dress; walking dress; evening dress; riding habits; bare bosoms and arms; hair: parted in the center, tight ringlets over the ears
- Men: fitted, single-breasted tailcoats; cravats wrapped up to the chin; sideburns and "Brutus style" natural hair; tight breeches; silk stockings; accessorized with: gold watches, cane, hats outside.

1820s:

- Women: dress waistlines began to drop; elaborate hem and neckline decoration; cone-shaped skirts; sleeves pinched
- Men: overcoats/greatcoats w. fur or velvet collars; the Garrick coat; Wellington boots; jockey boots

== Women's fashion ==
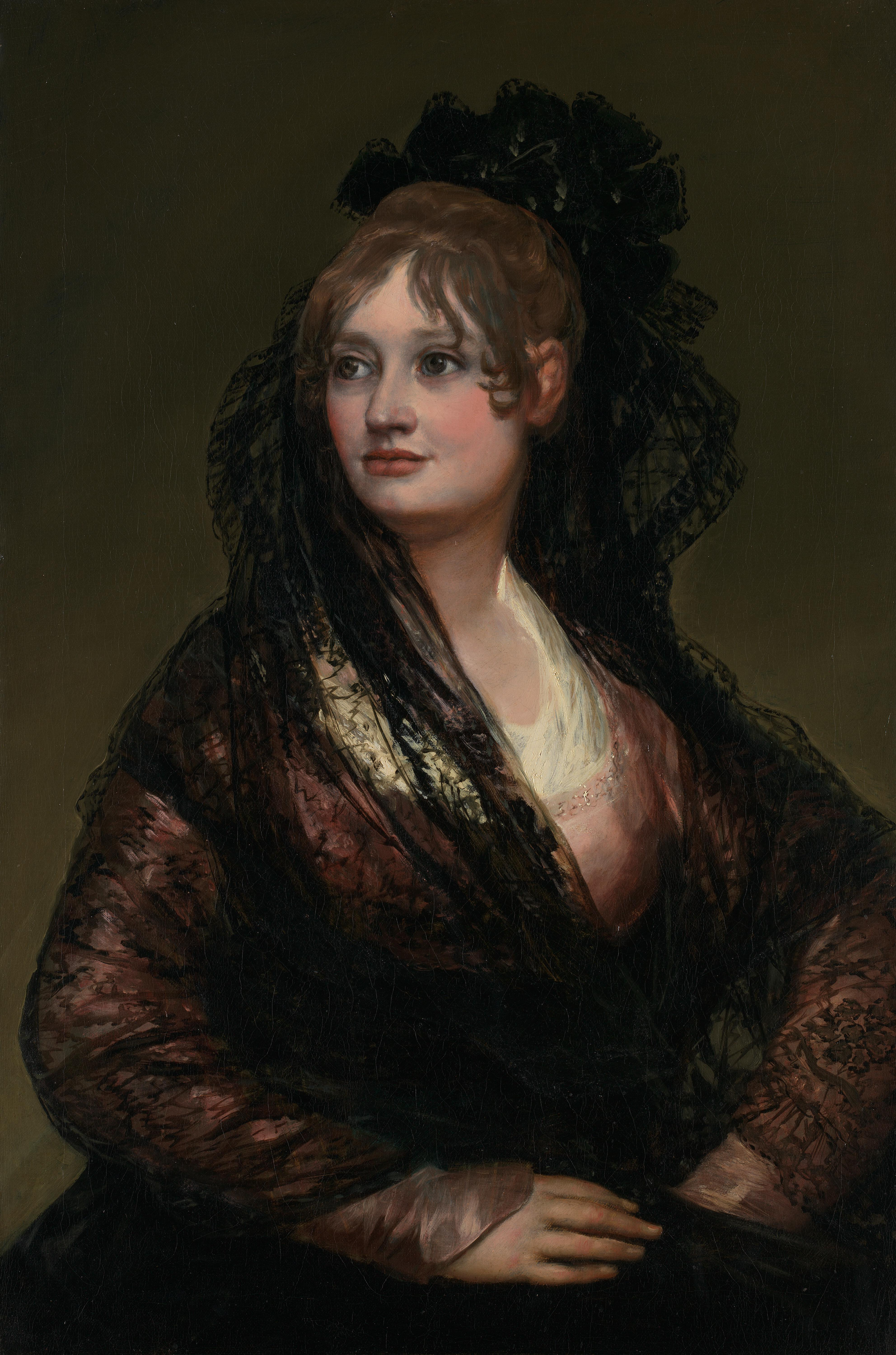
In Spain, some society ladies rebelled against French fashion by dressing as majas, like Doña Isabel de Porcel, 1805.

=== Overview ===
In this period, fashionable women's clothing styles were based on a high, under the bust waistline, only called the Empire silhouette in the 20th century — dresses were closely fitted to the torso just under the bust, falling loosely below. In different contexts, such styles are now commonly called "Directoire style" (referring to the Directory government of France during the second half of the 1790s), "Empire style" (referring to Napoleon's 1804–1814/1815 empire, and often also to his 1800–1804 "consulate"), or "Regency" (loosely used to refer to various periods between the 18th century and the Victorian). Empire silhouette and Directoire style were not used at the time these styles were worn.

These 1795–1820 fashions were quite different from the styles prevalent during most of the 18th century and the rest of the 19th century when women's clothes were generally tight against the torso from the natural waist upwards, and heavily full-skirted below (often inflated by means of hoop skirts, crinolines, panniers, bustles, etc.). Women's fashion around this time started to follow classical ideals, inspired by the ancient Greek and Roman style with its gracious, loosely falling dresses that were gathered or just accentuated over the natural waist under the bust. For women, heavily boned stays gave way to a celebration of the natural form. Bodices were short with waistlines falling just below the bust. Fashion fabrics such as cotton muslin were light to the point of being sheer, however, printed heavier cottons, wools and other textiles were also popular.

=== Gowns ===
Inspired by neoclassical tastes, 'undress' was the style of the day, casual and informal. It was the type of gown a woman wore from morning until noon or later depending on her social engagements of the day. The short-waisted dresses sported soft, loose skirts and were often made of white, almost transparent muslin, which was easily washed and draped loosely like the garments on Greek and Roman statues. Since the fabric clung to the body, revealing what was underneath, it made nudity à la grecque a centerpiece of public spectacle. Satin was sometimes worn for evening wear. 'Half Dress' is thought of as how one would dress when going out during the day or meeting with guests.' Full Dress' was what a lady wore to formal events, day or night. 'Evening Dress' was only appropriate at evening affairs. Thus during the 1795–1820 period, it was often possible for middle- and upper-class women to wear clothes that were not very confining or cumbersome, and still be considered decently and fashionably dressed.

Among middle- and upper-class women there was a basic distinction between morning dress (worn at home in the afternoons as well as mornings) and evening attire — generally, both men and women changed clothes in preparation for the evening meal and possible entertainments to follow. There were also further gradations such as afternoon dress, walking dress, riding habits, traveling dress, dinner dress, etc.

In the Mirror of Graces; or the English Lady's Costume, published in London in 1811, the author ("a Lady of Distinction") advised:

In the morning the arms and bosom must be completely covered to the throat and wrists. From the dinner-hour to the termination of the day, the arms, to a graceful height above the elbow, may be bare; and the neck and shoulders unveiled as far as delicacy will allow.

- Mourning dresses were worn to show the mourning of a loved one. They were high-necked and long-sleeved, covering throat and wrists, generally plain and black, and devoid of decoration.
- Gowns (now restricted to formal occasions) were often extravagantly trimmed and decorated with lace, ribbons, and netting. They were cut low and sported short sleeves, baring bosoms. Bared arms were covered by long white gloves. Our Lady of Distinction, however, cautions young women from displaying their bosoms beyond the boundaries of decency, saying, "The bosom and shoulders of a very young and fair girl may be displayed without exciting much displeasure or disgust."

A Lady of Distinction also advised young ladies to wear softer shades of color, such as pinks, periwinkle blue, or lilacs. The mature matron could wear fuller colors, such as purple, black, crimson, deep blue, or yellow.

Many women of this era remarked upon how being fully dressed meant the bosom and shoulders were bare, and yet being under-dressed would mean one's neckline went right up to one's chin.

=== Silhouette ===
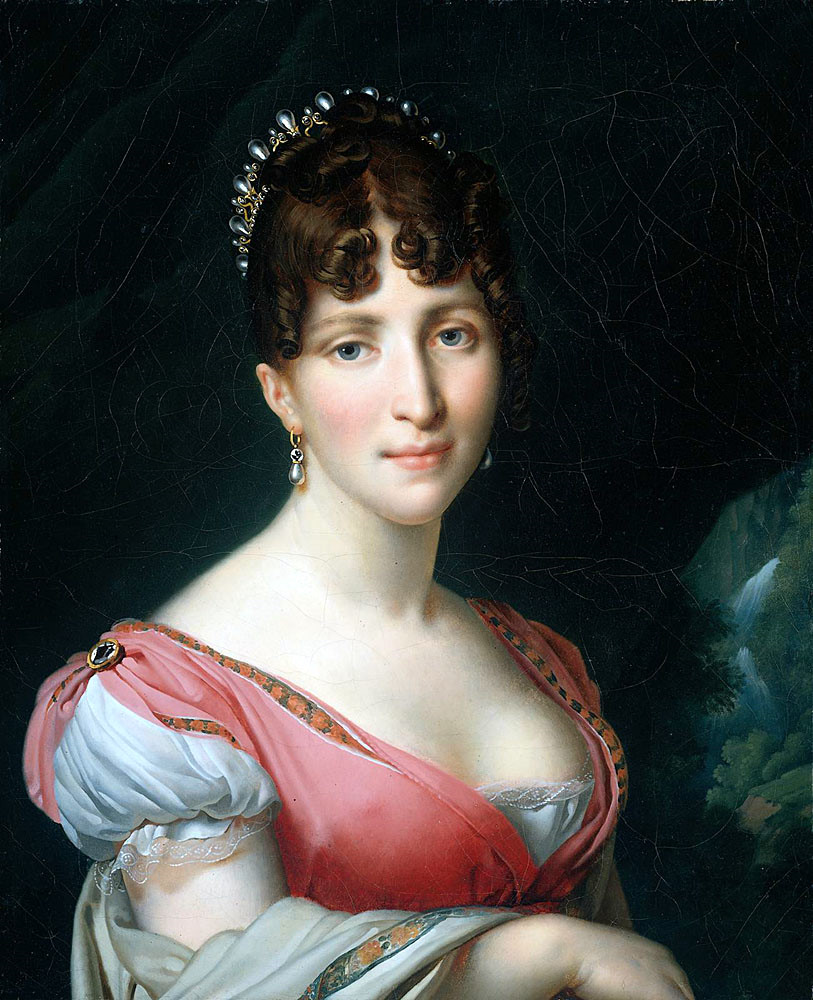
Hortense de Beauharnais

Due to the importance of showing social status, the fashion industry was very much influenced by society during the Regency era. One's position was determined by the person's wealth, etiquette, family status, intelligence, and beauty. Women financially and socially relied on their husbands. The only socially-acceptable activities in which women could participate centered around social gatherings and fashion, the most important component of which was attending evening parties. These parties helped to build relationships and connection with others. As etiquette dictated different standards of attire for different events, afternoon dress, evening dress, evening full dress, ball dress, and different types of dresses were popular.

Women's fashion in the Regency era started to change drastically. It popularized the empire silhouette, which featured a fitted bodice and high waist. This "new natural style" emphasized the beauty of the body's natural lines. Clothing became lighter and easier to care for than in the past. Women often wore several layers of clothing, typically undergarments, gowns, and outerwear. The chemise, the standard undergarment of the era, prevented the thin, gauzy dresses from being fully transparent. Outerwear, such as the spencer and the pelisse, were popular.

The empire silhouette was created in the late 18th century to about the early 19th century and referred to the period of the First French Empire. This adoption had been linked with France's neoclassical taste for Greek principles. In fact, however, its genealogy is much more complex. It was first worn by the French queen, whose reference was Caribbean, not Greek. The style was often worn in white to denote as high social status. Josephine Bonaparte was one of the figureheads for the Empire waistline, with her elaborated and decorated Empire line dresses. Regency women followed the Empire style along with the same trend of raised waistlines as French styles, even when their countries were at war. Starting from the 1780s and early 1790s, women's silhouette became slimmer and the waistlines crept up. After 1795, waistlines rose dramatically and the skirt circumference was further reduced. A few years later, England and France started to show the focus of the high waist style and this led to the creation of Empire style.

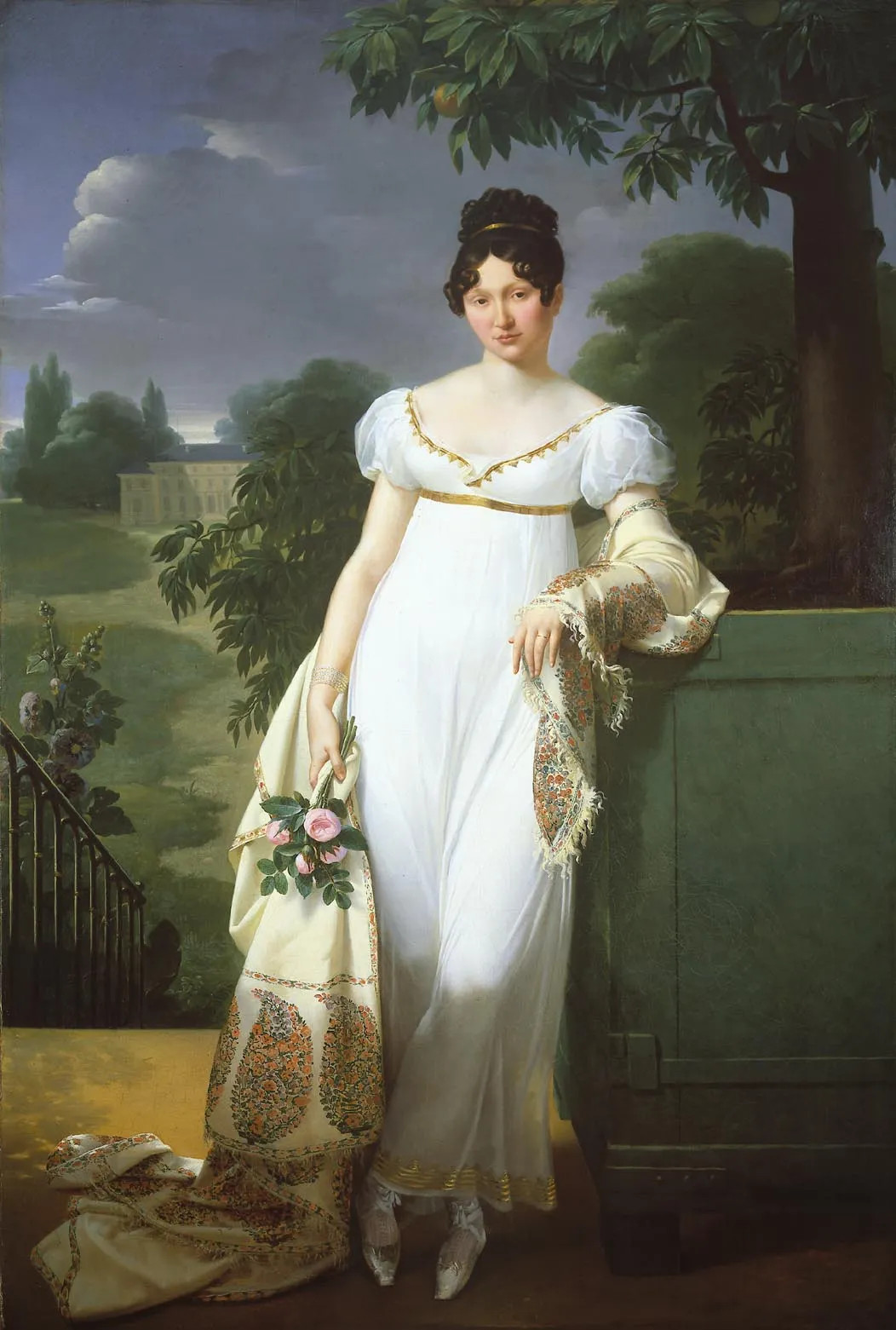
French lady in 1808; the style was often accompanied by a shawl or similar wrap, or a short "Spencer" jacket, as the dresses were light and left much uncovered

The style began as part of Neoclassical fashion, reviving styles from Greco-Roman art which showed women wearing loose-fitting rectangular tunics known as peplos which were belted under the bust, providing support for women and a cool, comfortable outfit especially in a warm climate. The empire silhouette was defined by the waistline, which was positioned directly under the bust. The Empire silhouette was the key style in women's clothing during the Regency era. The dresses were usually light, long, and fit loosely, they were usually in white and often sheer from the ankle to just below the bodice which strongly emphasized thin hem and tied around the body. A long rectangular shawl or wrap, very often plain red but with a decorated border in portraits, helped in colder weather and was apparently lain around the midriff when seated—for which sprawling semi-recumbent postures were favored. The dresses had a fitted bodice and it gave a high-waist appearance.

The style had waxed and waned in fashion for hundreds of years. The shape of the dresses also helped to lengthen the body's appearance. The clothing can also be draped to maximize the bust. Lightweight fabrics were typically used to create a flowing effect. Also, ribbon, sash, and other decorative features were used to highlight the waistline. The empire gowns were often with a low neckline and short sleeves and women usually wore them as for formal occasions. On the other hand, day dresses had a higher neckline and long sleeves. The chemisette was a staple for fashionable ladies. Although there were now differences between dresses and gowns, the high waistline was not changed.

=== Hairstyles and headgear ===
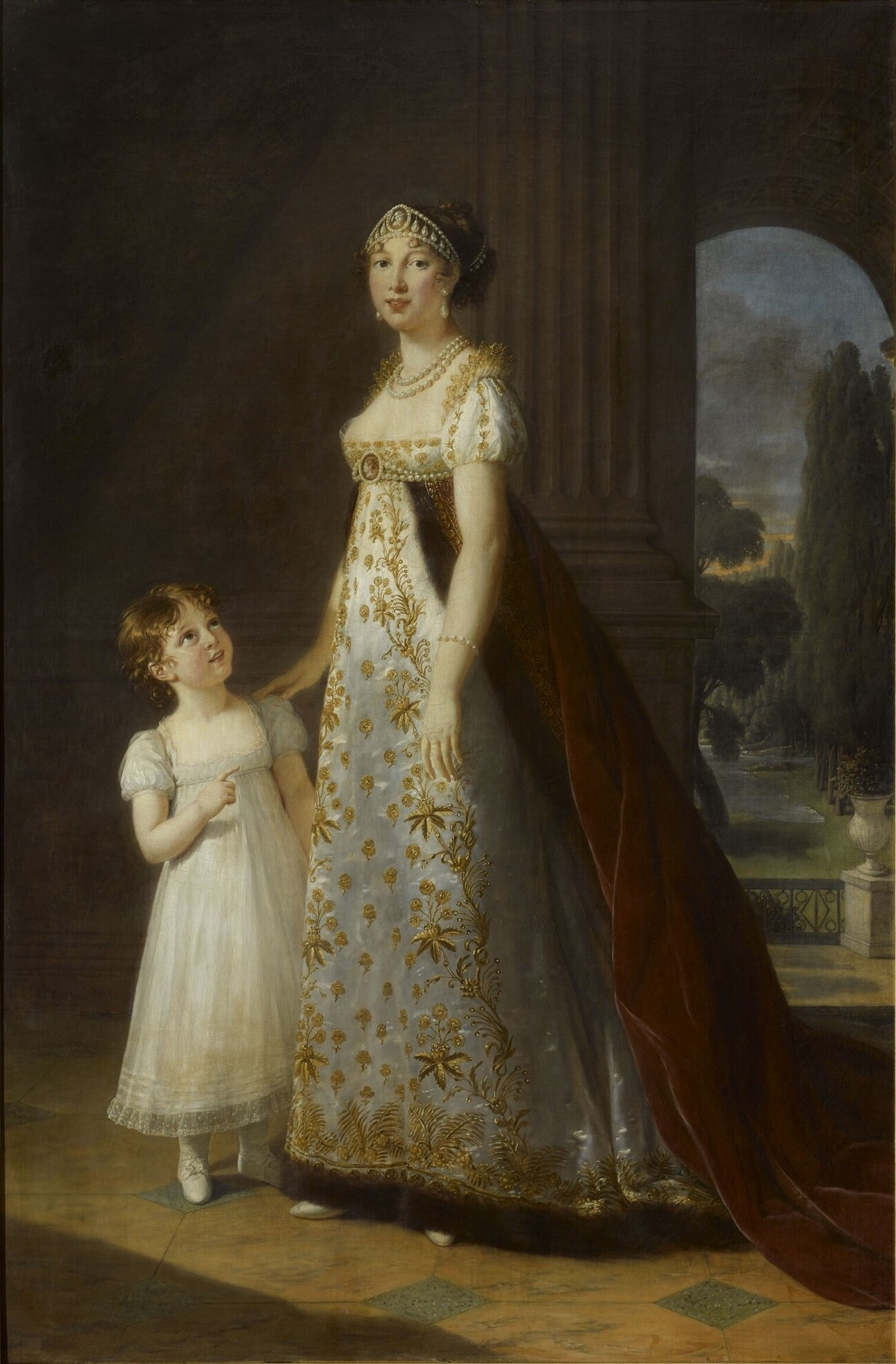
Portrait of Caroline Murat and her daughter Letizia, painted in 1807 by Elisabeth Vigée-Lebrun. Madame Murat wears the formal red train of court dress over her high-waisted gown.

During this period, the classical influence extended to hairstyles. Often masses of curls were worn over the forehead and ears, with the longer back hair drawn up into loose buns or Psyche knots influenced by Greek and Roman styles. By the later 1810s, front hair was parted in the center and worn in tight ringlets over the ears. Adventurous women like Lady Caroline Lamb wore short cropped hairstyles "à la Titus", the Journal de Paris reporting in 1802 that "more than half of elegant women were wearing their hair or wig à la Titus", a layered cut usually with some tresses hanging down.

In the Mirror of Graces, a Lady of Distinction writes,

Now, easy tresses, the shining braid, the flowing ringlet confined by the antique comb, or bodkin, give graceful specimens of the simple taste of modern beauty. Nothing can correspond more elegantly with the untrammeled drapery of our newly-adopted classic raiment than this undecorated coiffure of nature.

Conservative married women continued to wear linen mob caps, which now had wider brims at the sides to cover the ears. Fashionable women wore similar caps for morning (at home undress) wear.

For the first time in centuries, respectable but daringly fashionable women would leave the house without a hat or bonnet, previously something often associated with prostitutes. However, most women continued to wear something on their head outdoors, though they were beginning to cease to do so indoors during the day (as well as for evening wear). The antique head-dress, or Queen Mary coif, Chinese hat, Oriental-inspired turban, and Highland helmet were popular. As for bonnets, their crowns and brims were adorned with increasingly elaborate ornamentations, such as feathers and ribbons. In fact, ladies of the day embellished their hats frequently, replacing old decorations with new trims or feathers.

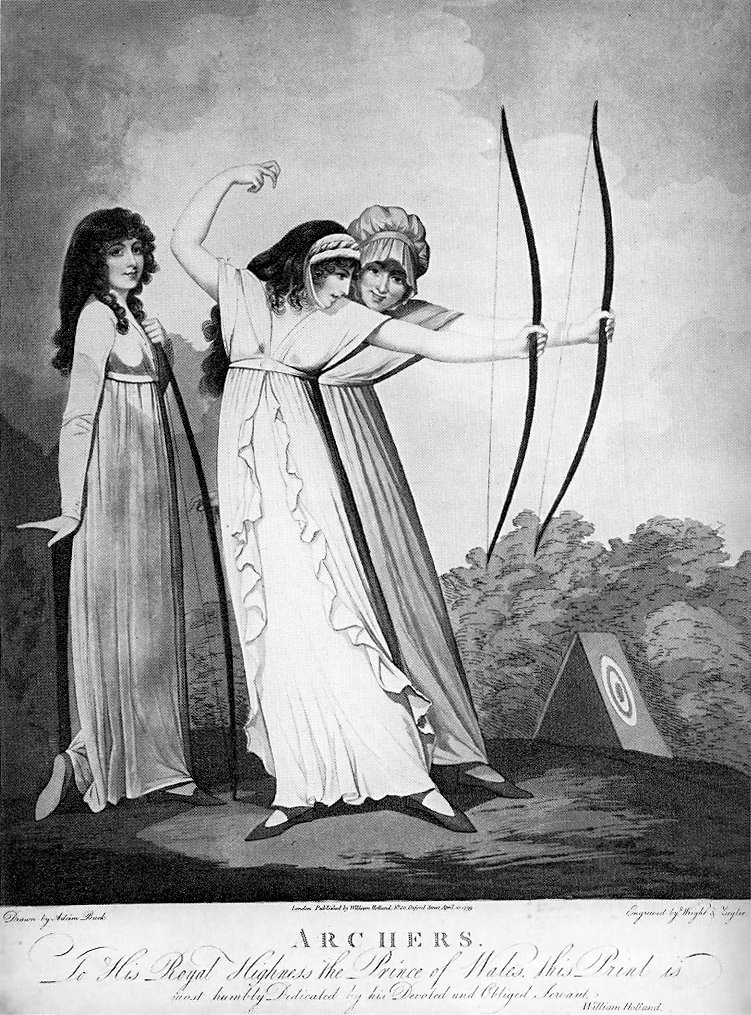
Two English girls practice archery, 1799

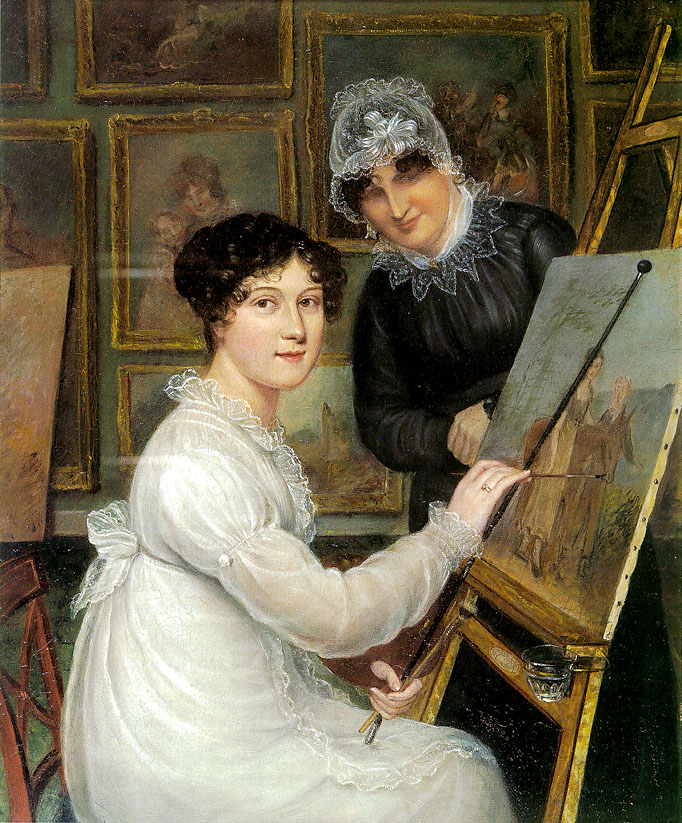
The Artist and her Mother. Painter Rolinda Sharples wears her hair in a mass of curls; her mother wears a sheer indoor cap, 1816.

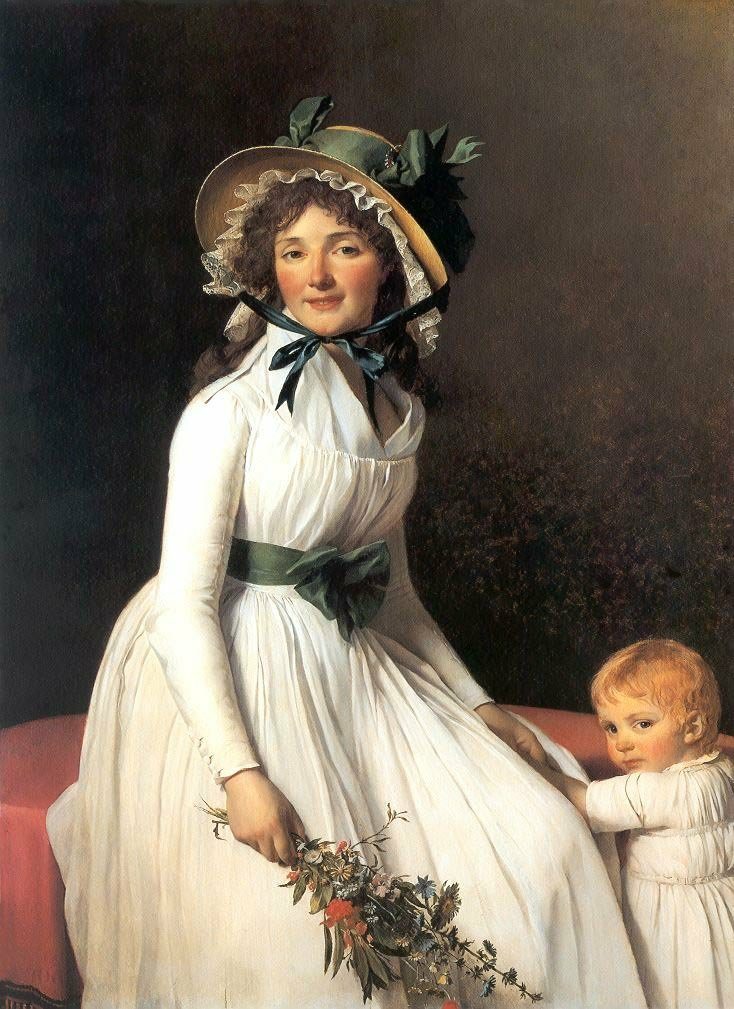
Mme Seriziat wears a straw bonnet trimmed with green ribbon over a lace mob cap, 1795 (painting by Jacques-Louis David)

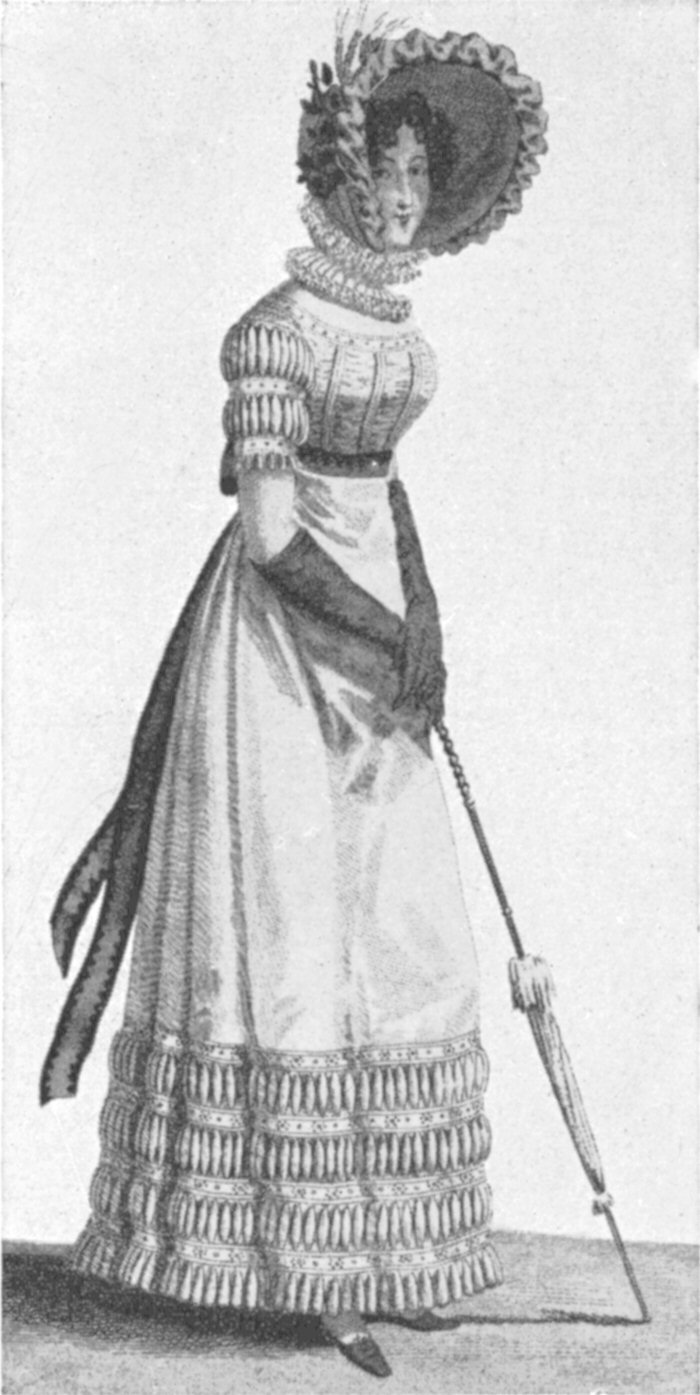
Fashionable bonnet, Paris, 1818

=== Undergarments ===
Fashionable women of the Regency era wore several layers of undergarments. The first was the chemise, or shift, a thin garment with tight, short sleeves (and a low neckline if worn under evening wear), made of white cotton and finished with a plain hem that was shorter than the dress. These shifts were meant to protect the outer-clothes from perspiration and were washed more frequently than outer clothes. In fact, washerwomen of the time used coarse soap when scrubbing these garments, then plunged them in boiling water, hence the absence of color, lace, or other embellishments, which would have faded or damaged the fabric under such rough treatment. Chemises and shifts also prevented the transparent muslin or silk dresses from being too revealing.

The next layer was a pair of stays or corset (more lightly boned). While high-waisted classical fashions required no corset for the slight of figure, most ordinary women still wore some kind of bust support, although the aim was to look as if they were not. The disappearance of the corset or stays has been much exaggerated by writers on the Regency period. There were some experiments to produce garments which would serve the same functions as a modern brassiere. (In the Mirror of Graces, a "divorce" was described as an undergarment that served to separate a woman's breasts. Made of steel or iron that was covered by a type of padding, and shaped like a triangle, this device was placed in the center of the chest.) "Short stays" (corsets extending only a short distance below the breasts) were often worn over the shift or chemise (not directly next to the skin), and "long stays" (corsets extending down towards the natural waist) were worn by women trying to appear slimmer than they were or who needed more support. The English wore these more than the French, but even such long stays were not primarily intended to constrict the waist, in the manner of Victorian corsets.

The final layer was the petticoat, which was the name for any skirt worn under the gown and could be a skirt with a bodice, a skirt attached over the torso by tapes, or a separate skirt. These petticoats were often worn between the underwear and the outer dress and were considered part of the outer clothing, not underwear. The lower edge of the petticoat was intended to be seen since women would often lift their outer dresses to spare the relatively delicate material of the outer dress from mud or damp (so exposing only the coarser and cheaper fabric of the petticoat to risk). Often exposed to view, petticoats were decorated at the hem with rows of tucks or lace, or ruffles.

"Drawers" (large, flowy 'shorts' with buttons at the crotch) were only occasionally worn at this time.

Stockings (hosiery), made of silk or knitted cotton, were held up by garters below the knee until suspenders were introduced in the late 19th century and were often of a white or pale flesh color.

=== Outerwear and shoes ===
Madame Rivière, 1806, Jean Auguste Dominique Ingres, Louvre.

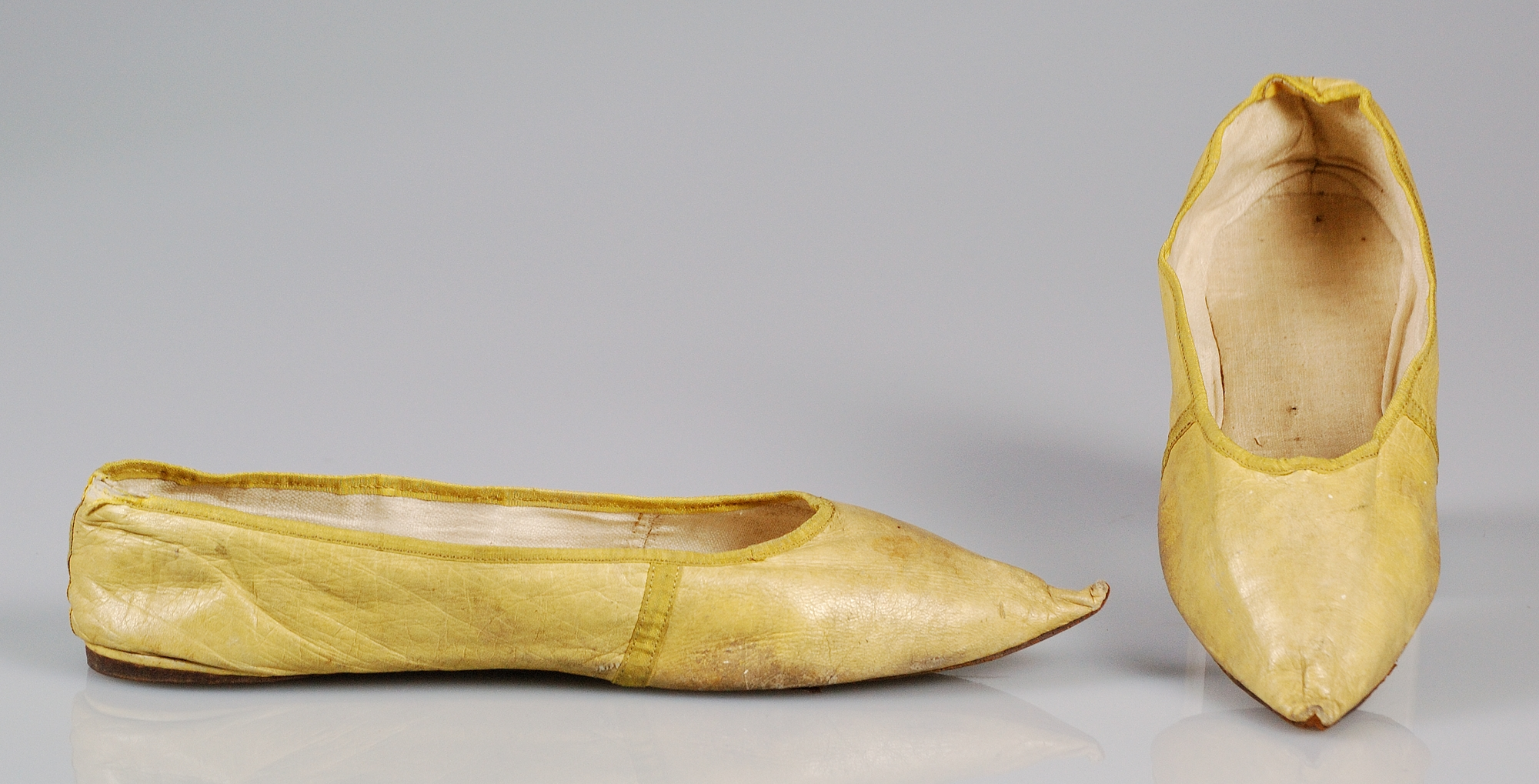
Leather slippers, between 1795 and 1805.

During this time period, women's clothing was much thinner than in the eighteenth century so warmer outerwear became important in fashion, especially in colder climates. Coat-like garments such as pelisses and redingotes were popular, as were shawls, mantles, mantelets, capes, and cloaks. The mantelet was a short cape that was eventually lengthened and made into a shawl. The redingote, another popular type, was a full-length garment resembling a man's riding coat (hence the name) in style, that could be made of different fabrics and patterns. Throughout the period, the Indian Kashmir shawl was the favored wrap, with the Scottish imitation Paisley shawls as a cheaper alternative. Paisley became the usual term for the patterns popular at the time.Houses including and the typical English country house were generally draughty, and the sheer muslin and light silk dresses popular during this time provided less protection. Shawls were made of soft cashmere or silk or even muslin for summer.

Short (high-waisted) jackets called spencers were worn outdoors, along with long-hooded cloaks, Turkish wraps, mantles, capes, Roman tunics, chemisettes, and overcoats called pelisses (which were often sleeveless and reached down as far as the ankles). These outer garments were often made of double sarsnet, fine Merino cloth, or velvets, and trimmed with furs, such as swan's down, fox, chinchilla, or sable. On May 6, 1801, Jane Austen wrote her sister Cassandra, "Black gauze cloaks are worn as much as anything."

Thin, flat fabric (silk or velvet), or leather slippers were generally worn (as opposed to the high-heeled shoes of much of the 18th century).

Metal pattens were strapped on shoes to protect them from rain or mud, raising the feet an inch or so off the ground.

=== Accessories ===
Gloves were always worn by women outside the house. When worn inside, as when making a social call, or on formal occasions, such as a ball, they were removed when dining. About the length of the glove, A Lady of Distinction writes:

If the prevailing fashion be to reject the long sleeve, and to partially display the arm, let the glove advance considerably above the elbow, and there be fastened with a draw-string or armlet. But this should only be the case when the arm is muscular, coarse, or scraggy. When it is fair, smooth, and round, it will admit of the glove being pushed down to a little above the wrists.

Longer gloves were worn rather loosely during this period, crumpling below the elbow. As described in the passage above, "garters" could fasten longer gloves.

Reticules held personal items, such as vinaigrettes. The form-fitting dresses or frocks of the day had no pockets, thus these small drawstring handbags were essential. These handbags were often called buskins or balantines. They were rectangular in shape and was worn suspended by a woven band from a belt placed around the figure above the waist.

Parasols (as shown in the illustration) protected a lady's skin from the sun and were considered an important fashion accessory. Slender and light in weight, they came in a variety of shapes, colors, and sizes.

Fashionable ladies (and gentlemen) used fans to cool themselves and to enhance gestures and body language. Made of paper or silk on sticks of ivory and wood, and printed with oriental motifs or popular scenes of the era, these ubiquitous accessories featured a variety of shapes and styles, such as pleated or rigid. An information sheet from the Cheltenham Museum describes fans and their use in body language and communication (click and scroll to page 4).

=== Directoire (1795–1799) ===
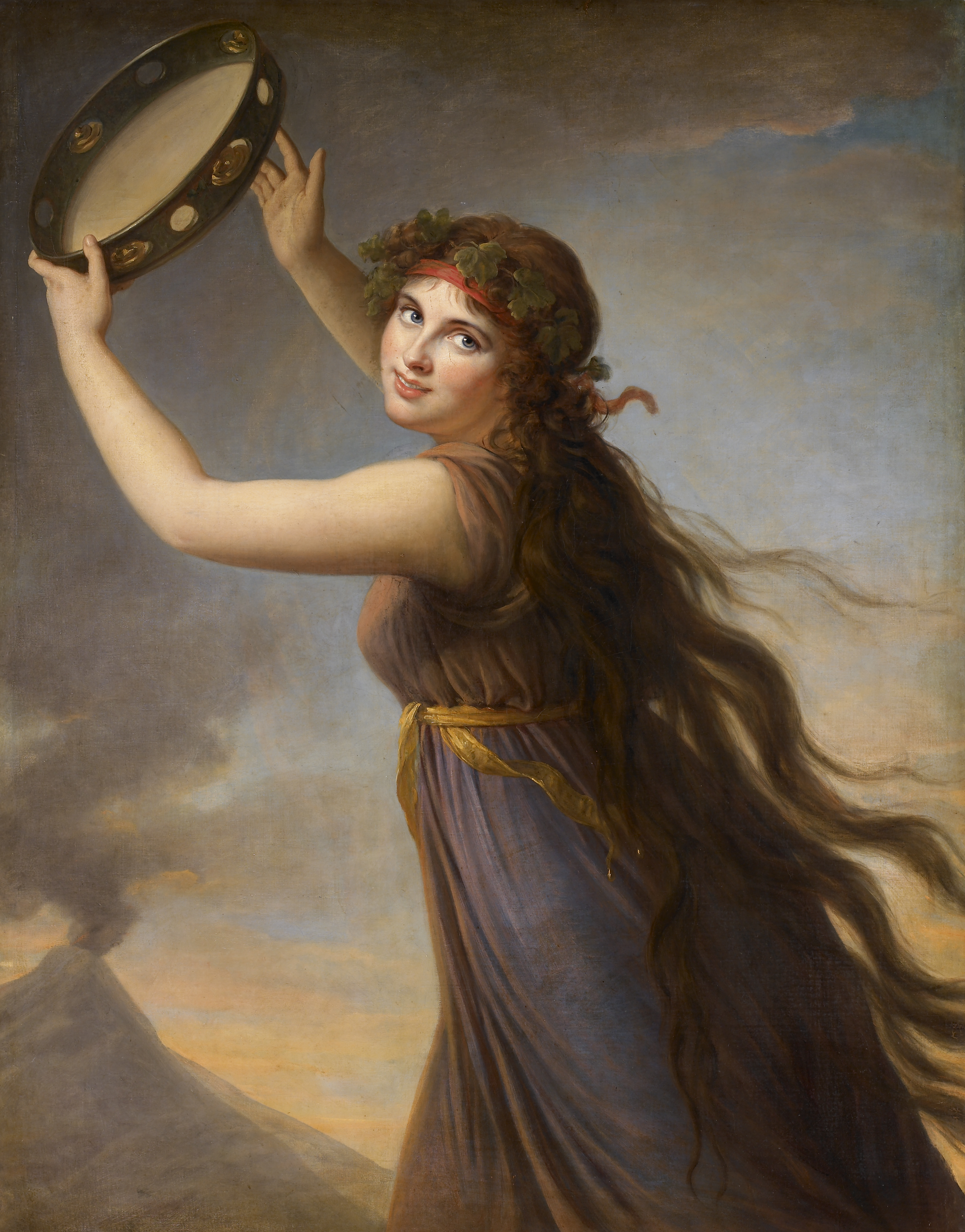
Portrait of Emma, Lady Hamilton by Elisabeth Vigée-Lebrun ca. 1790s.

By the mid-1790s, neoclassical clothing had come into fashion in France. Several influences had combined to bring about this simplification in women's clothing: aspects of Englishwomen's practical country outdoor-wear leaked up into French high fashion, and there was a reaction in revolutionary France against the stiffly boned corsets and brightly colored satins and other heavy fabrics that were in style in the Ancien Régime (see 1750–1795 in fashion). But ultimately, Neo-classicism was adopted for its association with classical republican ideas [with reference to Greece, rather than republican Rome, which was now considered politically dangerous]. This renewed fascination of the classical past was encouraged by the recent discoveries of Pompeii and Herculaneum, and would likely have not been possible outside such a specific geographic and historical setting that allowed the idea of the past made present to become paramount.

Along with the influences of the Pompeii and Herculaneum excavations, several other factors came together to popularize neoclassical dress. Starting in the early 1790s, Emma Hamilton began her performances of attitudes, something that was considered by contemporaries as entirely new. These attitudes were based loosely on the ancient practice of pantomime, though Emma's performances lacked masks and musical accompaniment. Her performances created a fusion between art and nature; art came alive and her body became a type of art. As an aid to her performances of tragic mythological and historical figures, Emma wore the clothing á la grecque that would become popular in mainstream France in the coming years. A simple light-colored chemise made from thin, flowing material was worn and gathered with a narrow ribbon under the breasts. Simple cashmere shawls were used as headdresses or to give more fullness to the drapery of the chemise. They also helped to prevent broken lines in the performance so that the outstretched arms were always connected with the body, escalating the effect of fluid movement, and oftentimes, a cape or a cloak was worn to emphasize the lines of the body in certain poses. This highlighted the continuity of surface of line and form in the body of the performer to emphasize the unity, simplicity, and continuously flowing movement from one part of the body to the next. The hair was worn in a natural, loose, and flowing fashion. All of these properties blended together to allow an extensive play of light and shadow to reveal and accent certain parts of the body during the performance while covering others. Emma was highly capable in her attitudes, and the influence of her dress spread from Naples to Paris as wealthy Parisians took the Grand Tour.

There is also some evidence that the white muslin shift dress became popular after Thermidor through the influence of prison dress. Revolutionary women such as Madame Tallien portrayed themselves in this way because it was the only clothing they possessed during their time in prison. The chemise á la grecque also represented the struggle for representation of the self and the stripping down of past cultural values. Also, a simplification of the attire worn by pre-teen girls in the 1780s (who were no longer required to wear miniature versions of adult stays and panniers) probably paved the way for the simplification of the attire worn by teenage girls and adult women in the 1790s. Waistlines became somewhat high by 1795, but skirts were still rather full, and neoclassical influences were not yet dominant.

It was during the second half of the 1790s that fashionable women in France began to adopt a thoroughgoing Classical style, based on an idealized version of ancient Greek and Roman dress (or what was thought at the time to be ancient Greek and Roman dress), with narrow clinging skirts. Some of the extreme Parisian versions of the neoclassical style (such as narrow straps which bared the shoulders, and diaphanous dresses without sufficient stays, petticoats, or shifts worn beneath) were not widely adopted elsewhere, but many features of the late-1790s neoclassical style were broadly influential, surviving in successively modified forms in European fashions over the next two decades.

With this Classical style came the willingness to expose the breast. With the new iconography of the Revolution as well as a change in emphasis on maternal breast-feeding, the chemise dress became a sign of the new egalitarian society. The style was simple and appropriate for the comfort of a pregnant or nursing woman as the breasts were emphasized and their availability was heightened. Maternity became fashionable and it was not uncommon for women to walk around with their breasts exposed. Some women took the "fashionable maternity" a step further and wore a "six-month pad" under their dress to appear pregnant.

White was considered the most suitable color for neoclassical clothing (accessories were often in contrasting colors). Short trains trailing behind were common in dresses of the late 1790s.

==== Directoire gallery ====
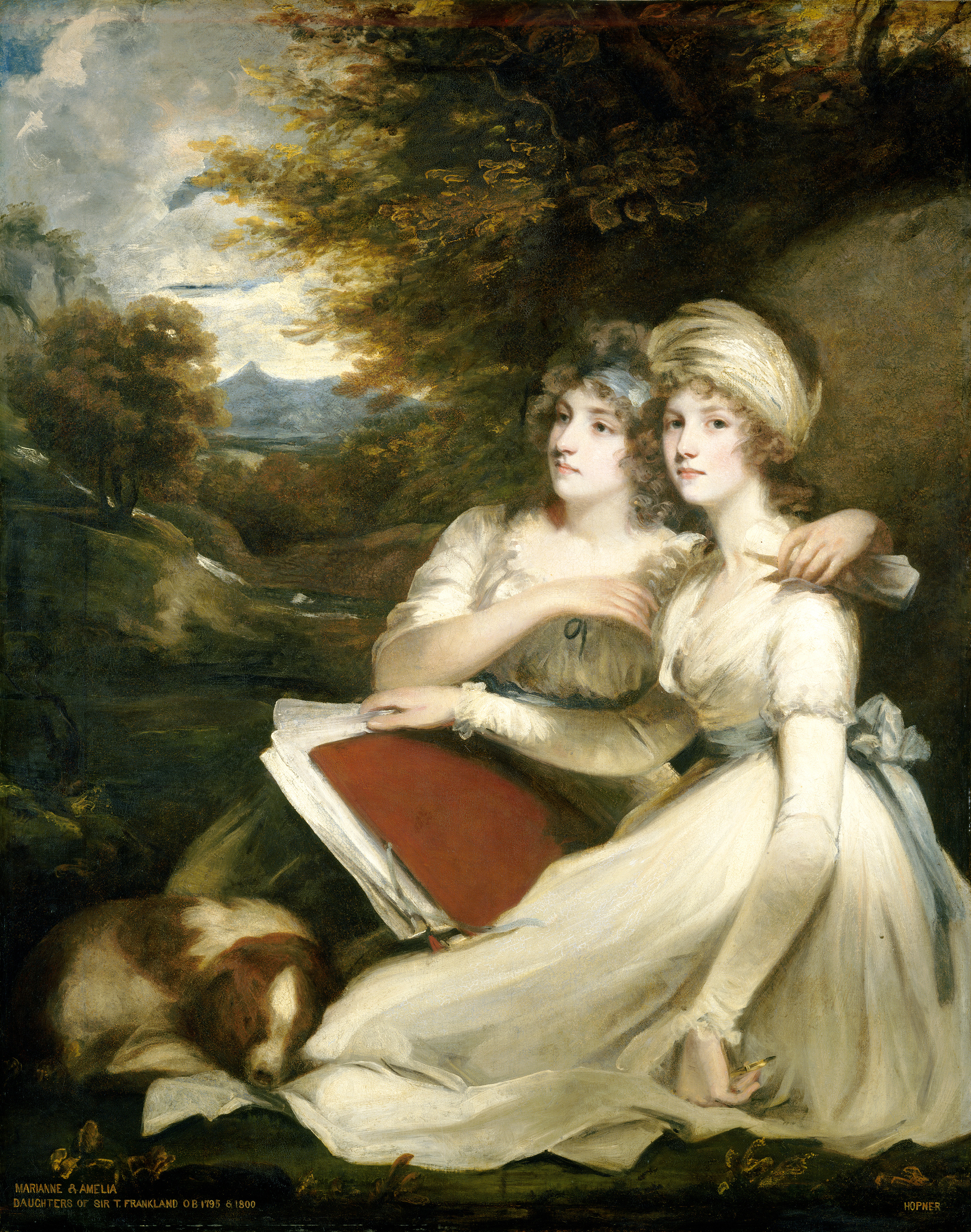
1 – 1795

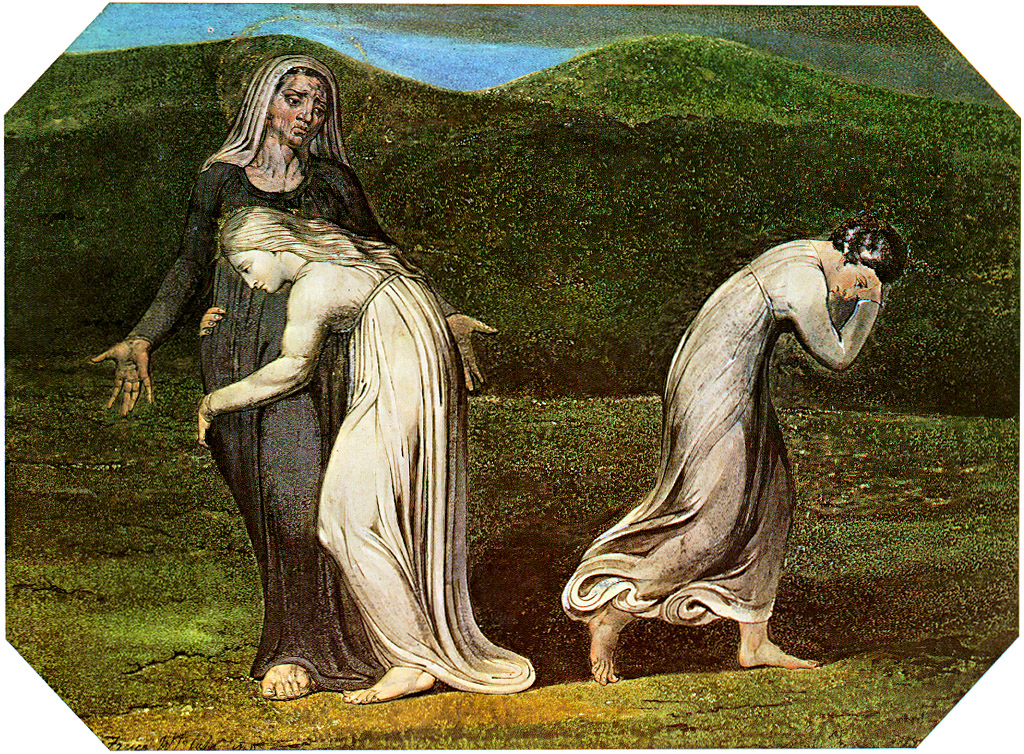
2 – 1795

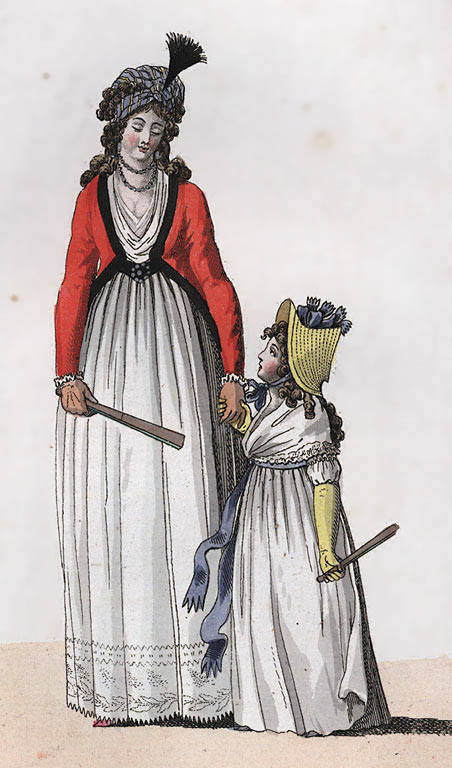
3 – 1796

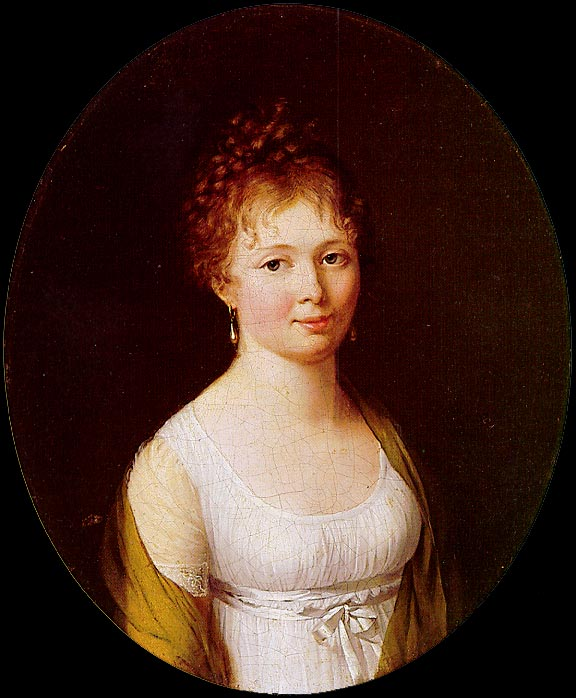
4 – c. 1798

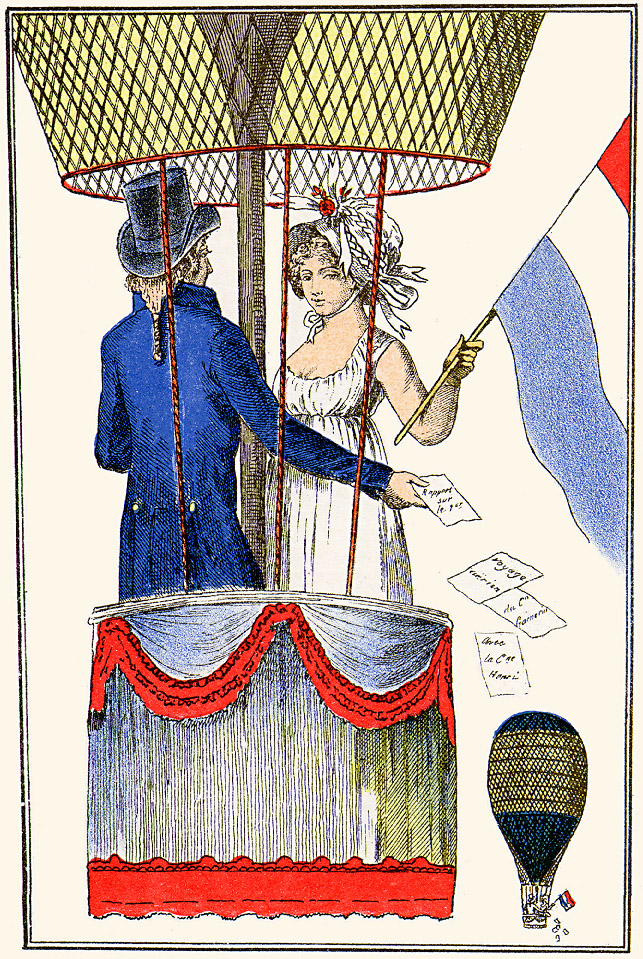
5 – 1798

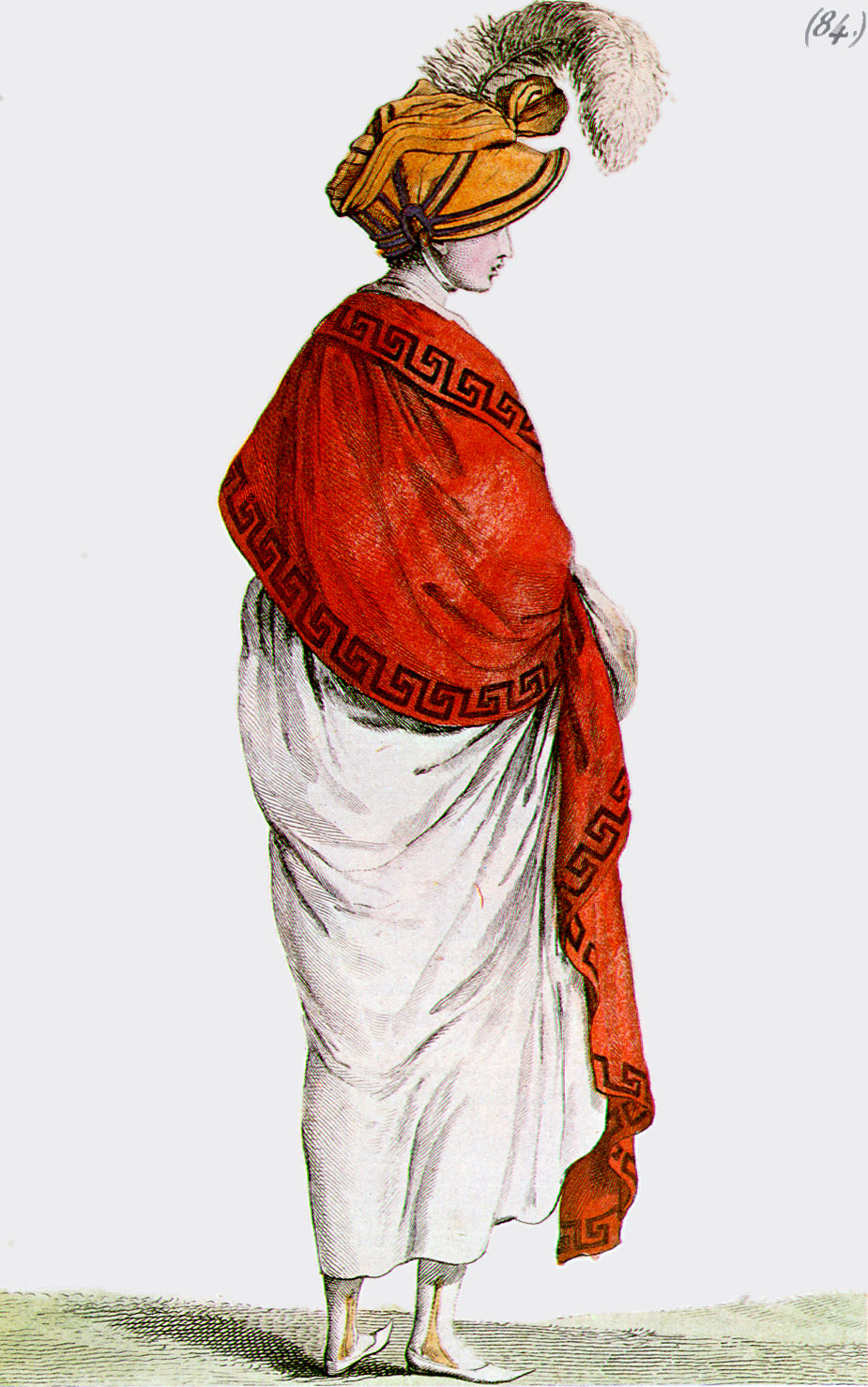
6 – 1799

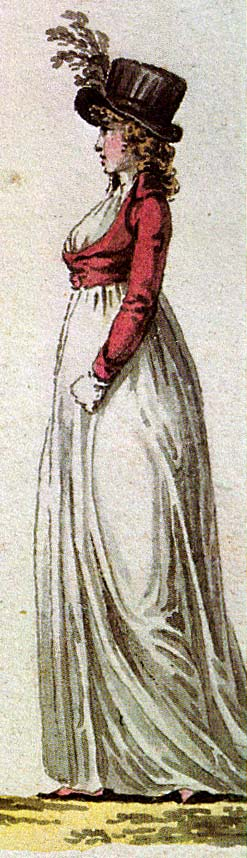
7 – 1798

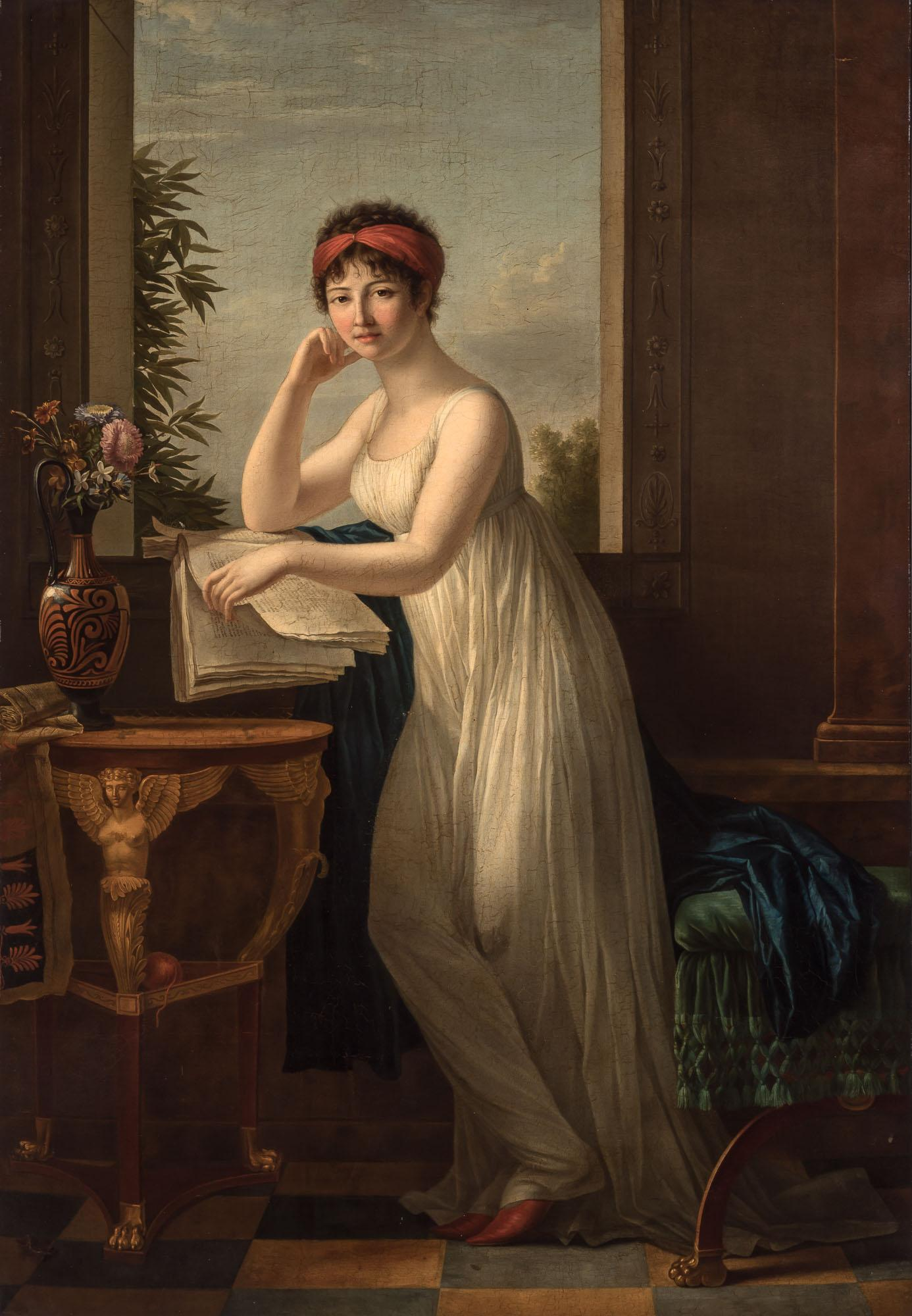
8 – 1798

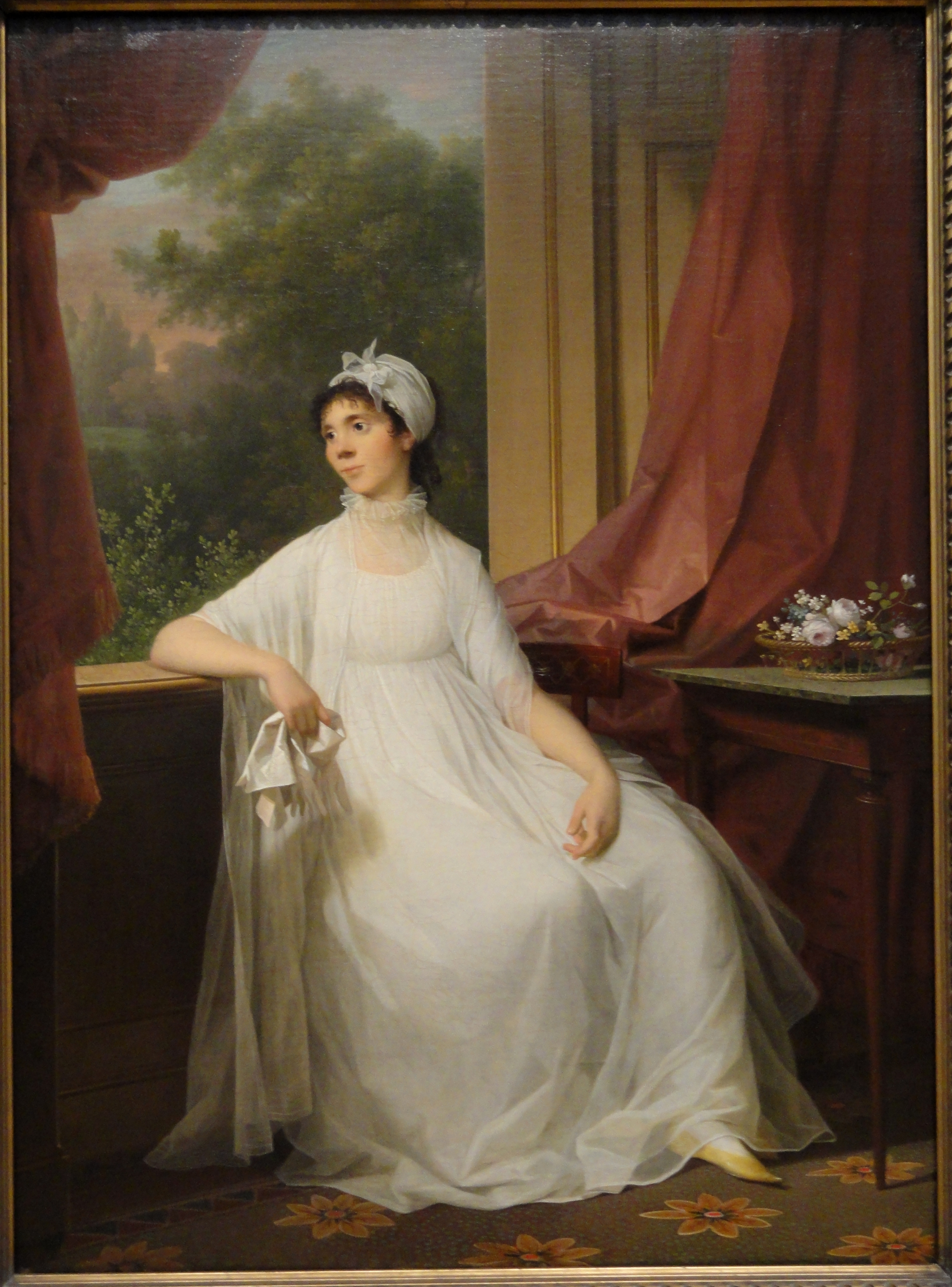
9 – 1799

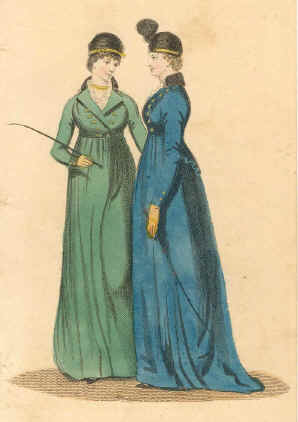
10 – 1799
1. The Frankland Sisters by John Hoppner gives an idea of the styles of 1795.
2. "Ruth entreating Naomi and Orpah to return to the land of Moab" by William Blake. Blake is not a typical neo-classicist, but this shows a somewhat similar idealization of antiquity (as well as predicting the future high fashions of the late 1790s). The particular image was composed in 1795 and is currently held by the Fitzwilliam Museum.
3. Leipzig fashion plate showing woman and girl wearing elegantly simple high-waisted styles, which are not strongly neoclassical, however.
4. Portrait of Gabrielle Josephine du Pont.
5. 1798 picture, showing a lady who seems none too warmly attired for a balloon journey in her low-cut thin-looking Directoire dress.
6. Fashion plate of white Directoire dress worn with contrasting red shawl with a Greek key border.
7. A 1798 sketch of a day outfit with short "spencer" jacket (less neoclassical, though still following the empire silhouette).
8. Marie-Denise Villers wears an almost transparent white dress.
9. Gertrud Hage wears a white transparent dress over a white petticoat.
10. Riding habits of 1799. The habit on the right features a short jacket with tails. The green habit on the left may be a redingote rather than a jacket and petticoat.

===== Caricatures =====
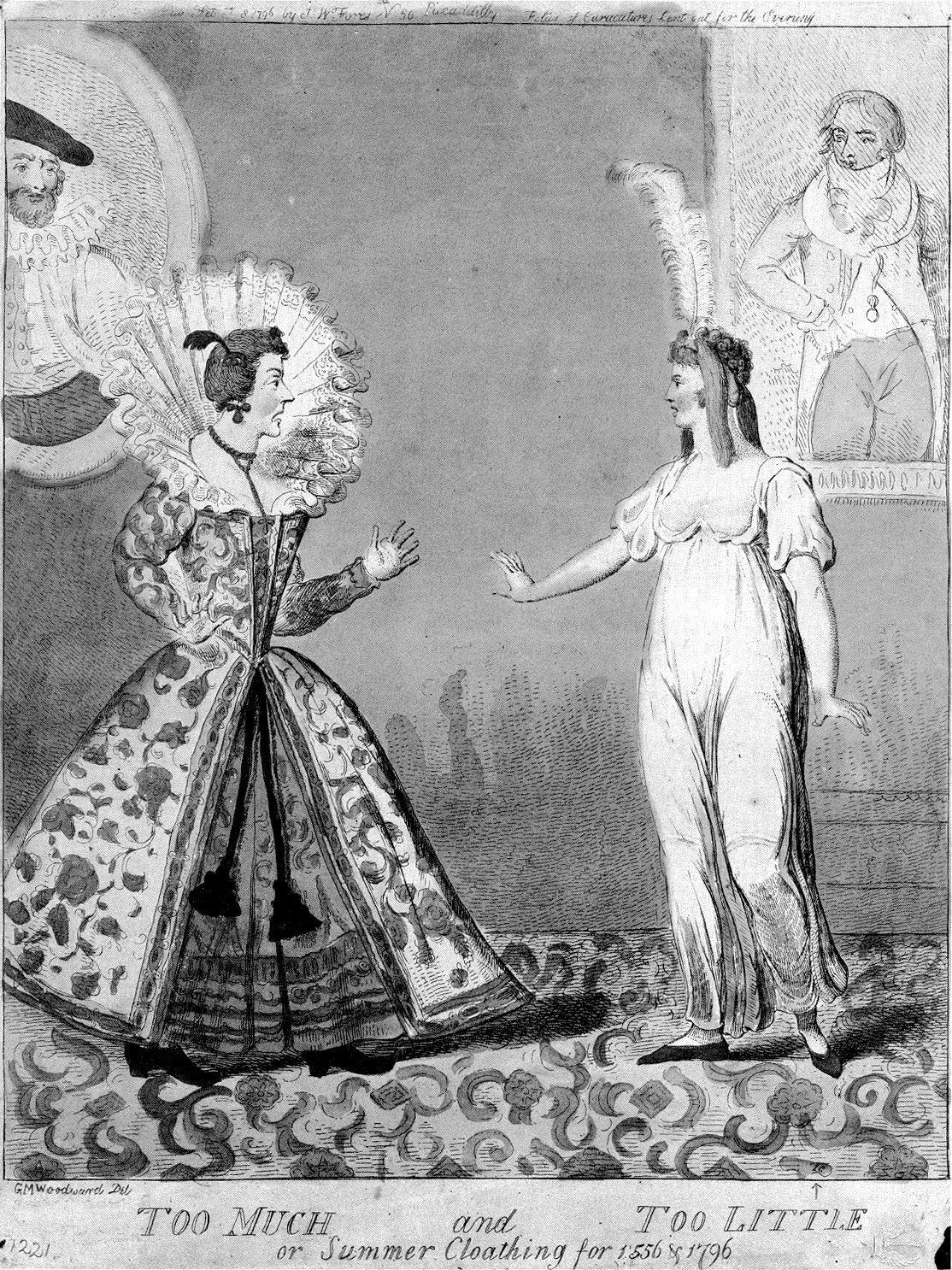
1796

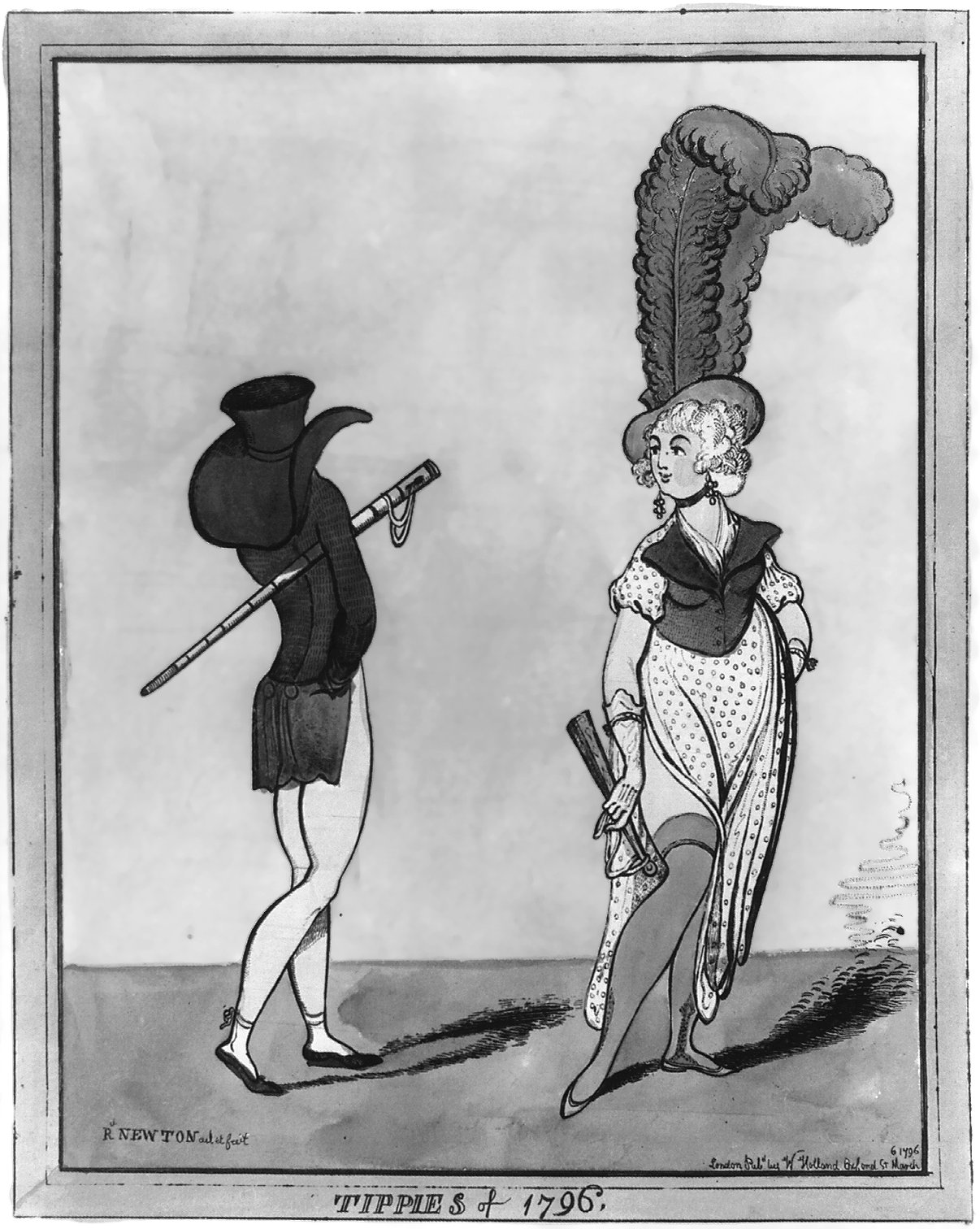
2 – 1796

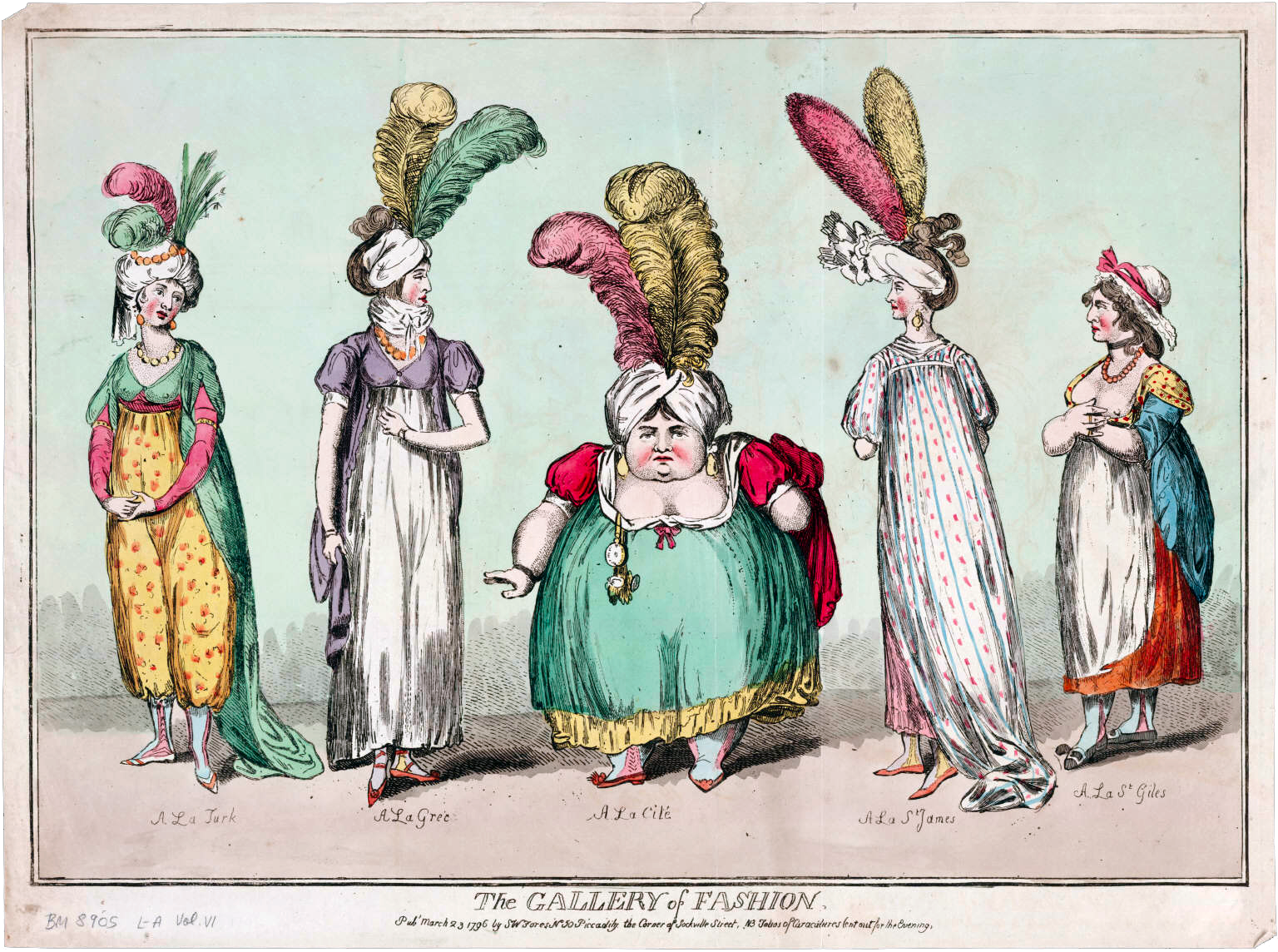
3 – 1796

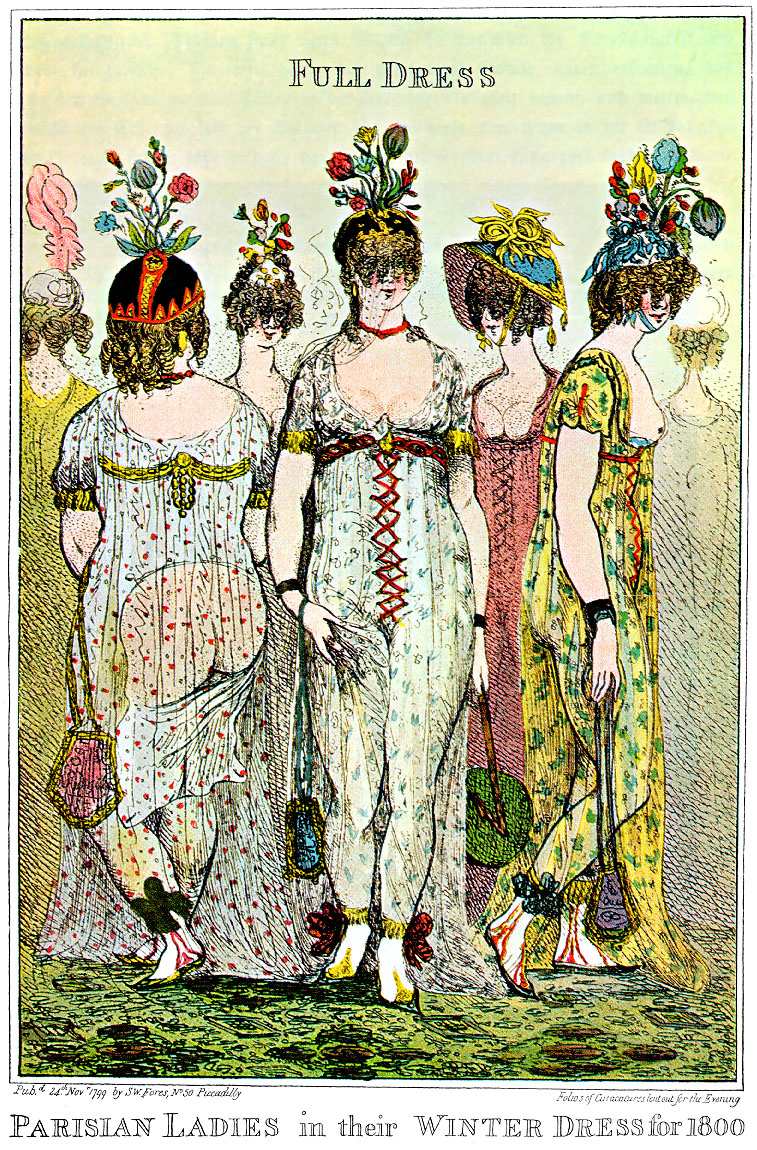
4 – 1799

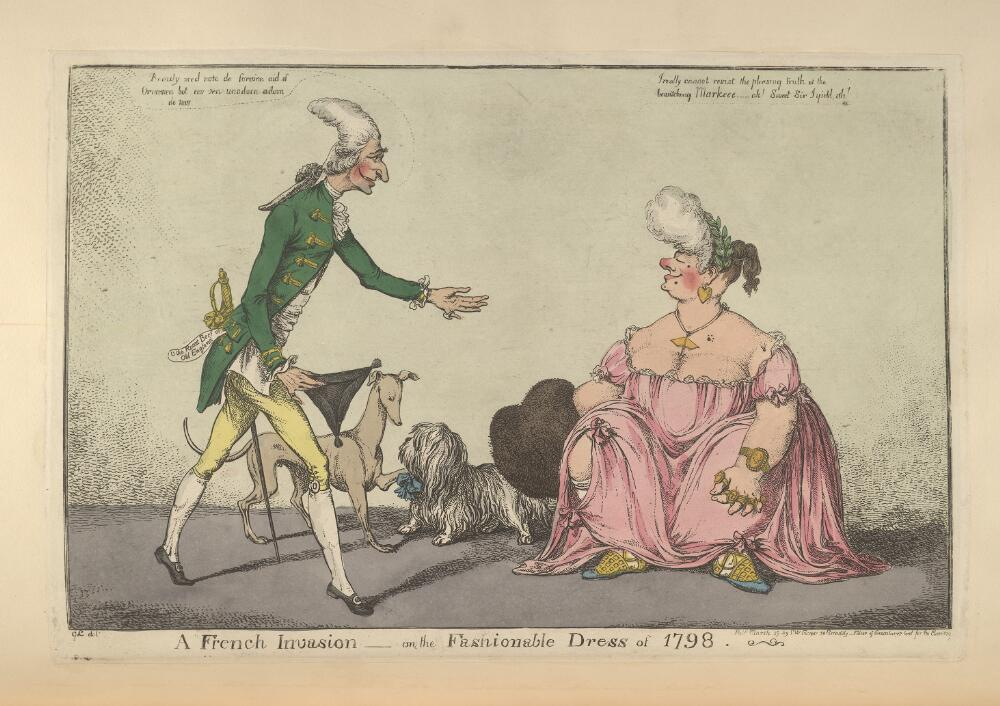
5 – 1798

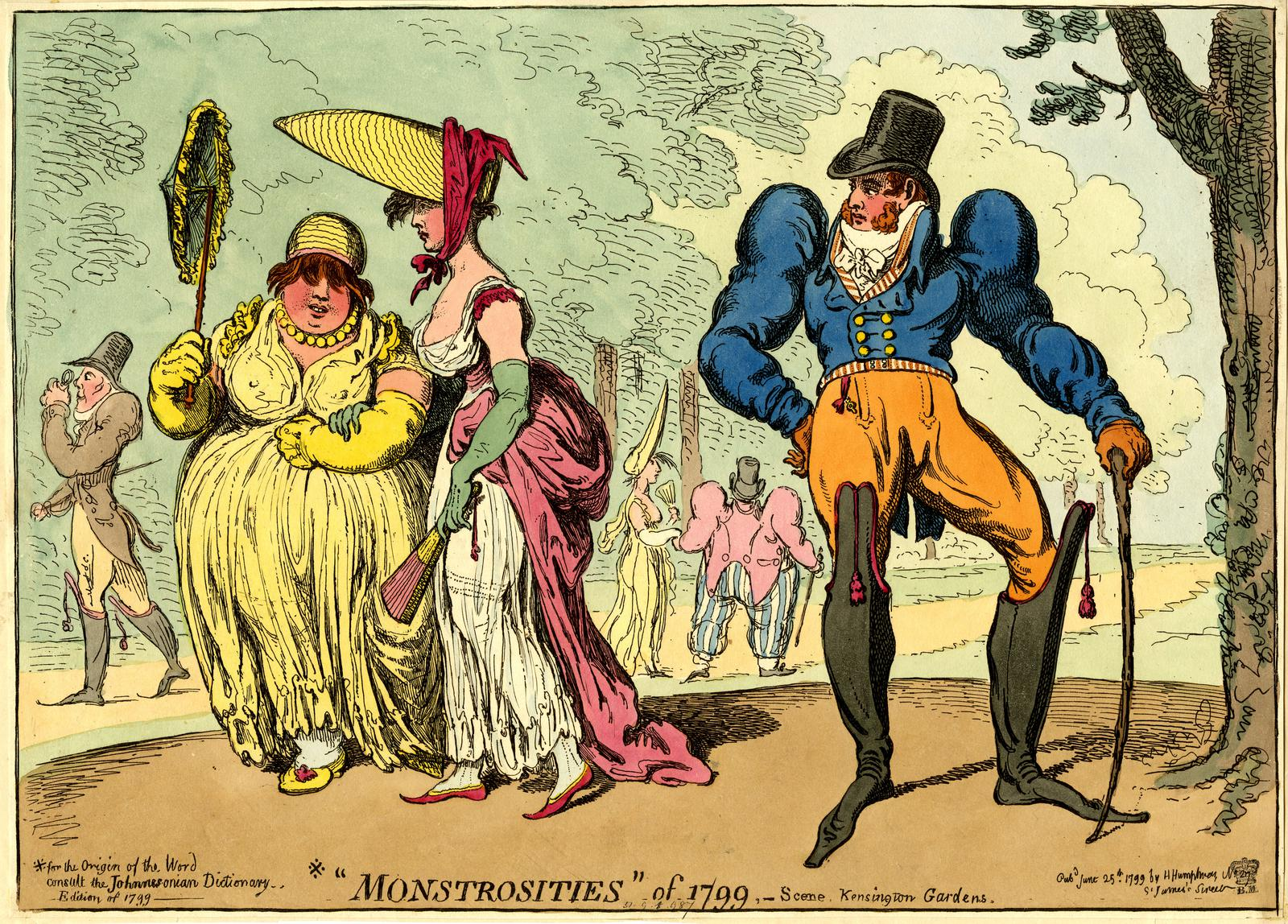
6 – 1799.jpg
1. "TOO MUCH and TOO LITTLE, or Summer Clothing of 1556 & 1796", a February 8, 1796, caricature engraved by Isaac Cruikshank (father of George) after a drawing by George M. Woodward. Contrast between old Elizabethan and Directoire clothing styles; in 1796, strongly neoclassically influenced styles were still very new in England. Notice the single vertical feather springing from the hair of the 1796 woman.
2. "Tippies of 1796", a highly stylized parody which caricatures women's feather headdresses and dandies' tight trousers, among other things.
3. "The gallery of fashion" satirizes early neo-classical influenced fashions.
4. "Parisian ladies in their full winter dress", an over-the-top caricature by Isaac Cruikshank of allegedly excessively diaphanous styles worn in late 1790s Paris.
5. "A French Invasion on the Fashionable Dress of 1798," British caricature, also showing tight trousers, wigs, and square neckline.
6. "Monstrosities of 1799".

=== Empire (1800–1815) ===
During the first two decades of the 19th century, fashions continued to follow the basic high-waisted empire silhouette, but in other respects, neoclassical influences became progressively diluted. Dresses remained narrow in the front, but fullness at the raised back waist allowed room to walk. Colors other than white came into style, the fad for diaphanous outer fabrics faded (except in certain formal contexts), and some elements of obviously visible ornamentation came back into use in the design of the dress (as opposed to the elegant simplicity or subtle white-on-white embroidery of the dress of ca. 1800).

==== Empire gallery ====
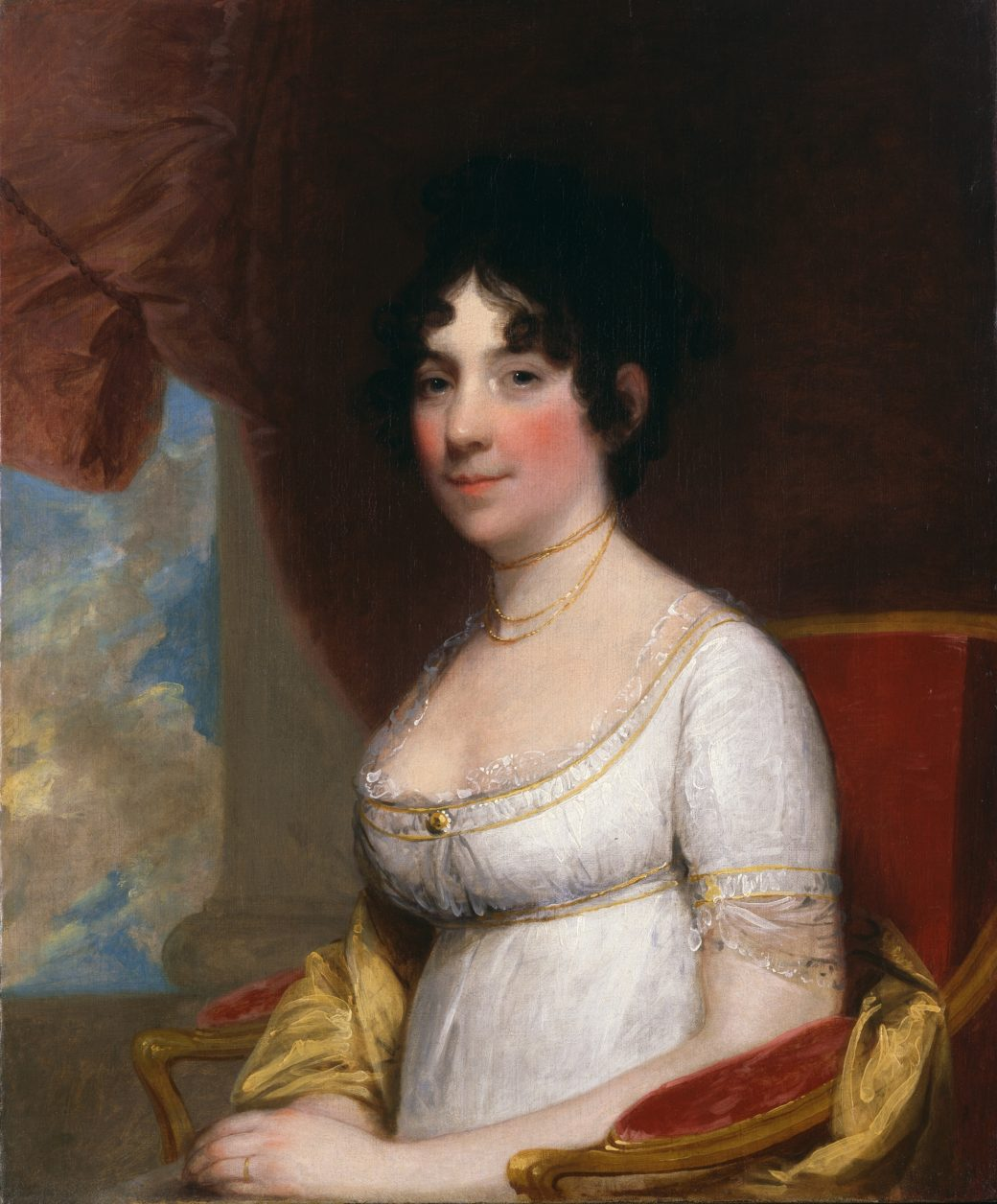
1 – 1804

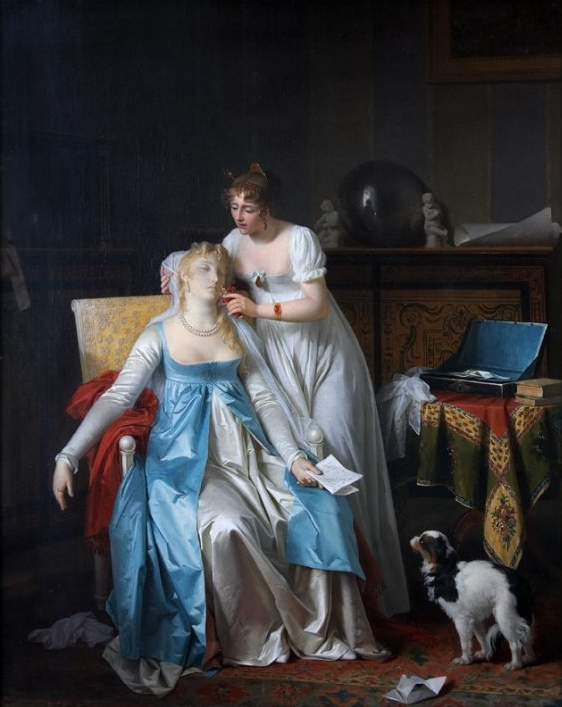
2 - 1804

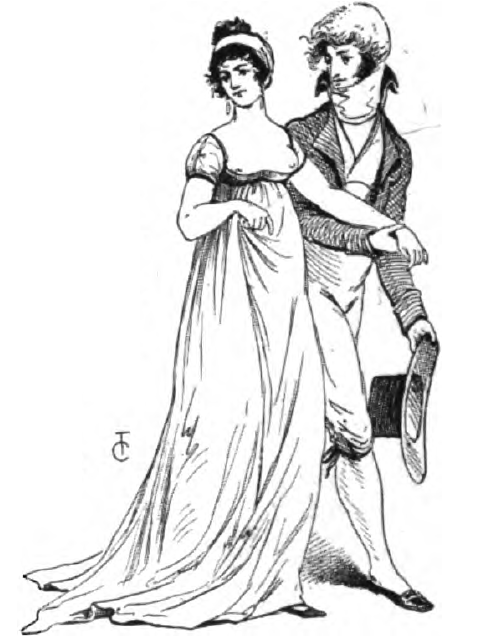
3 – 1804

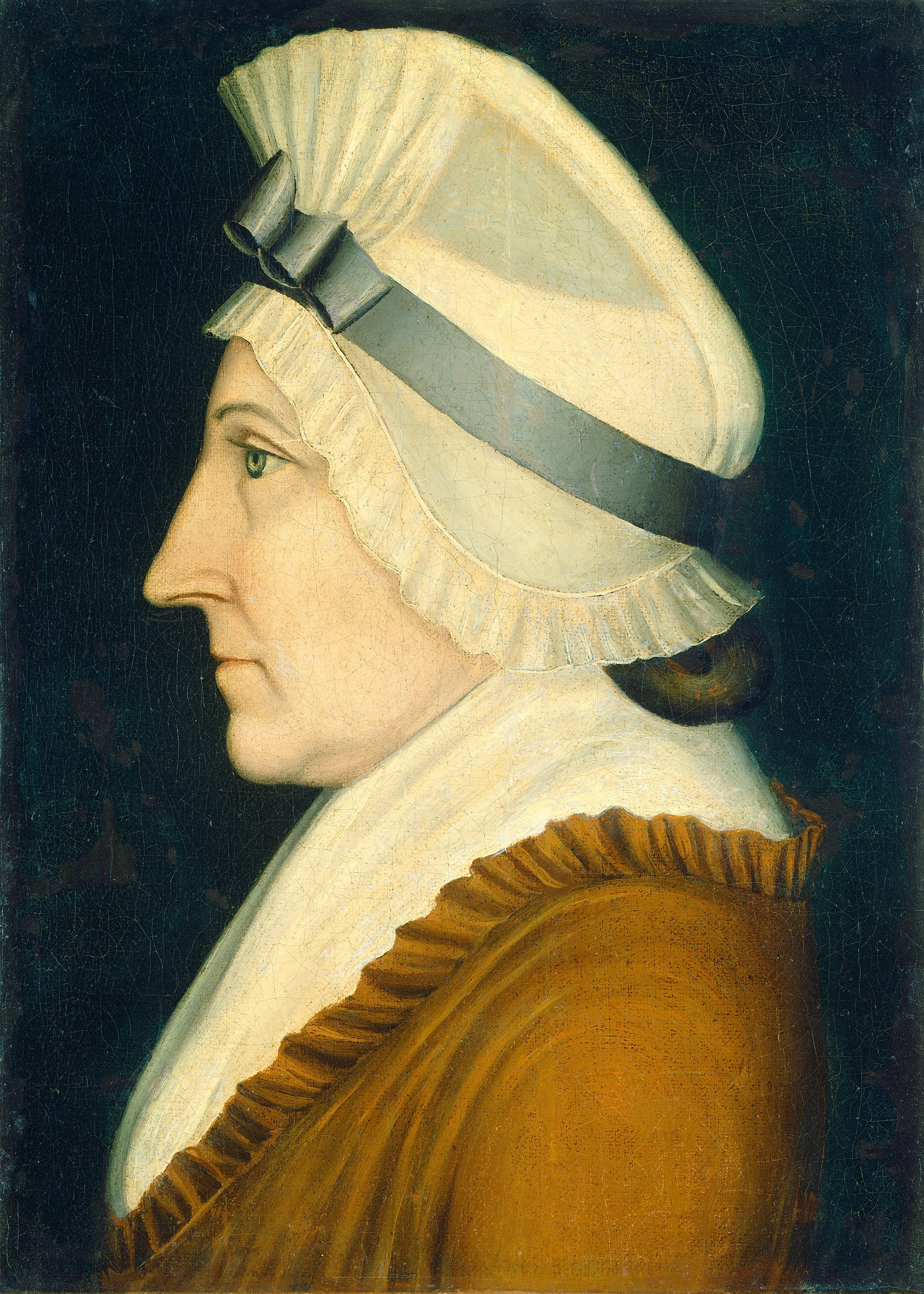
4 – c. 1805

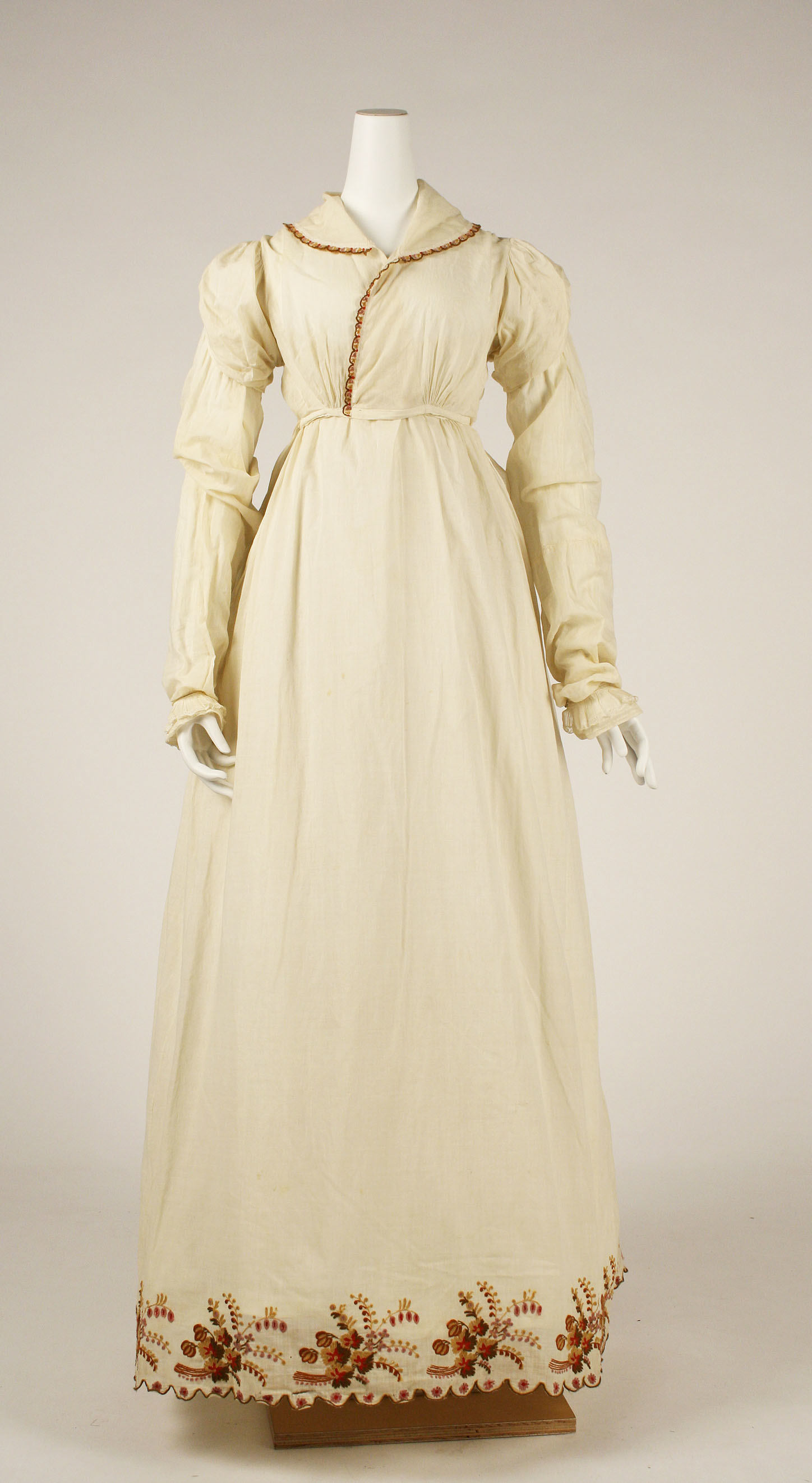
5 – c. 1806

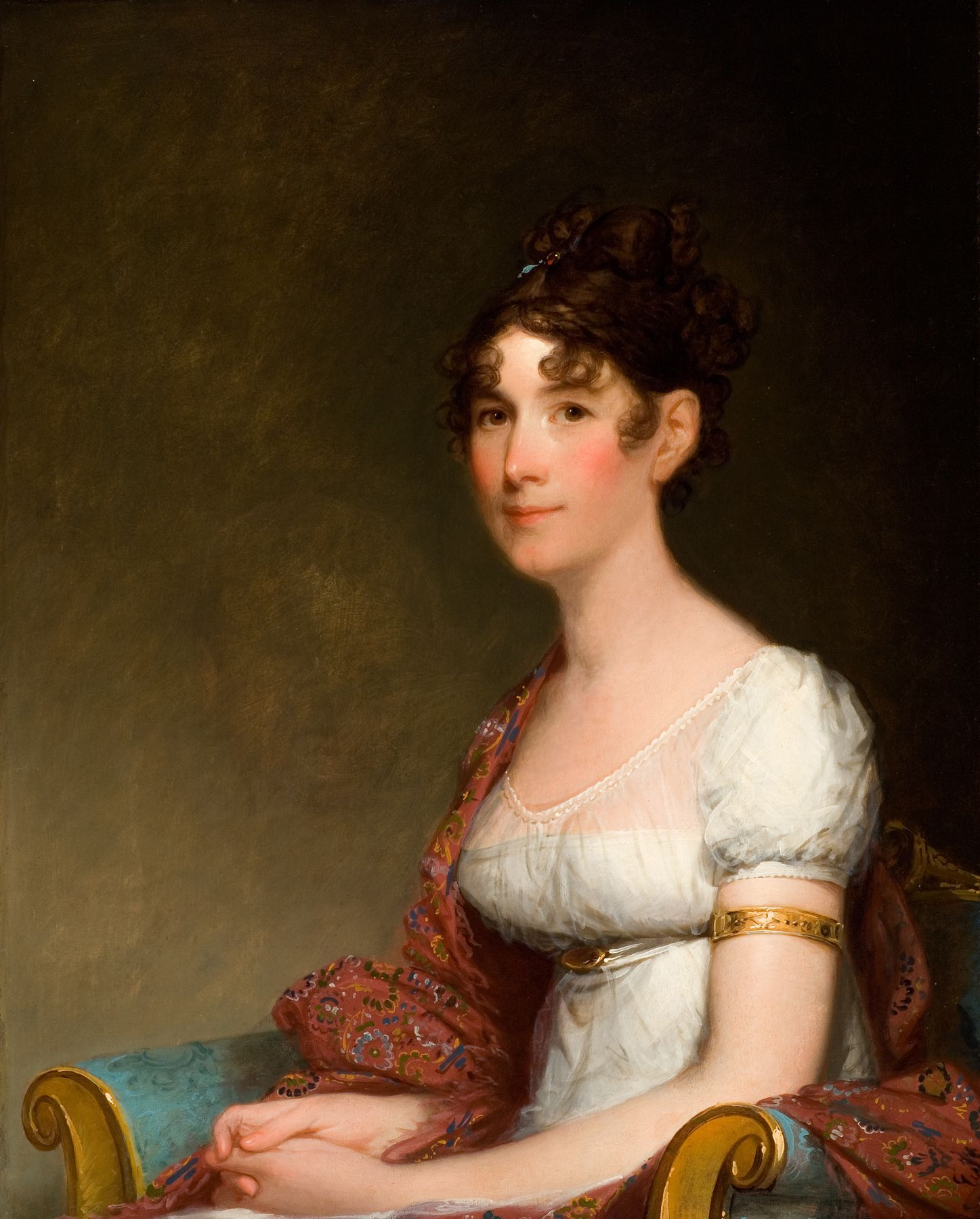
6 – 1809

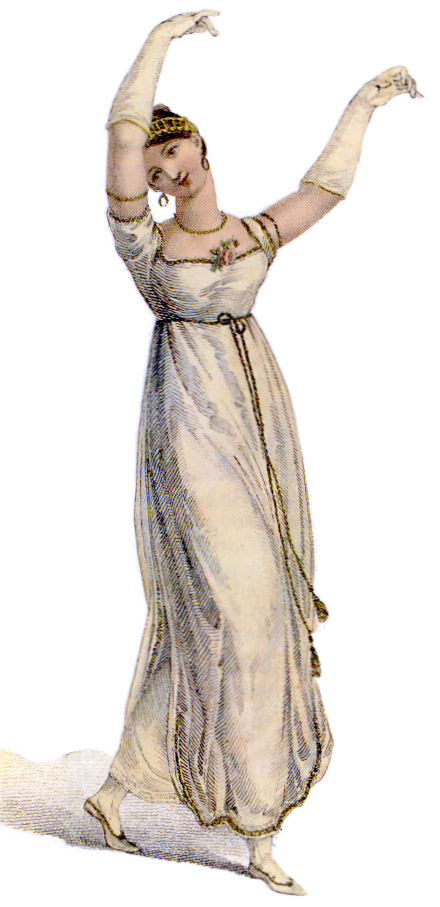
7 – 1809

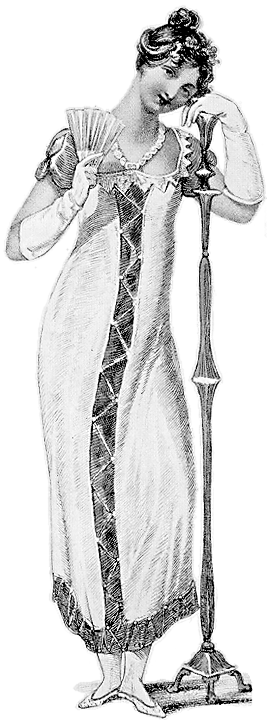
8 – 1810

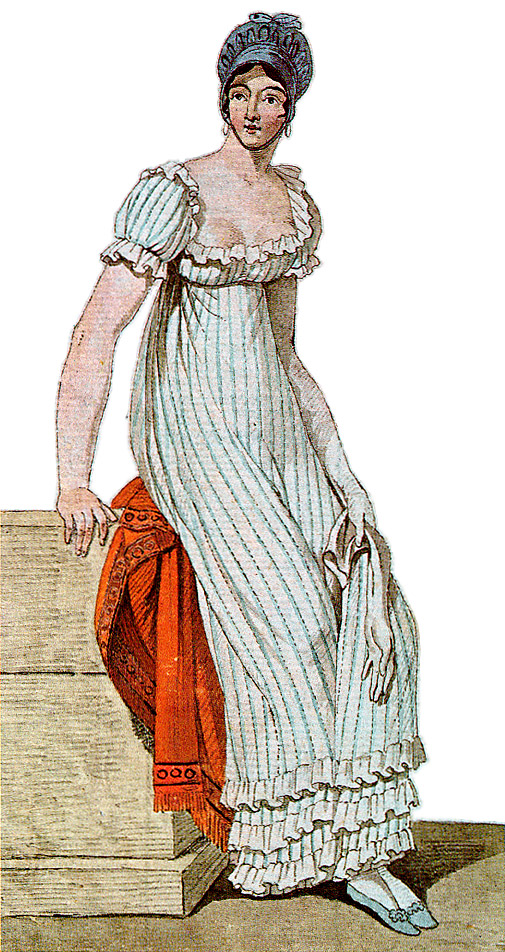
9 – 1810

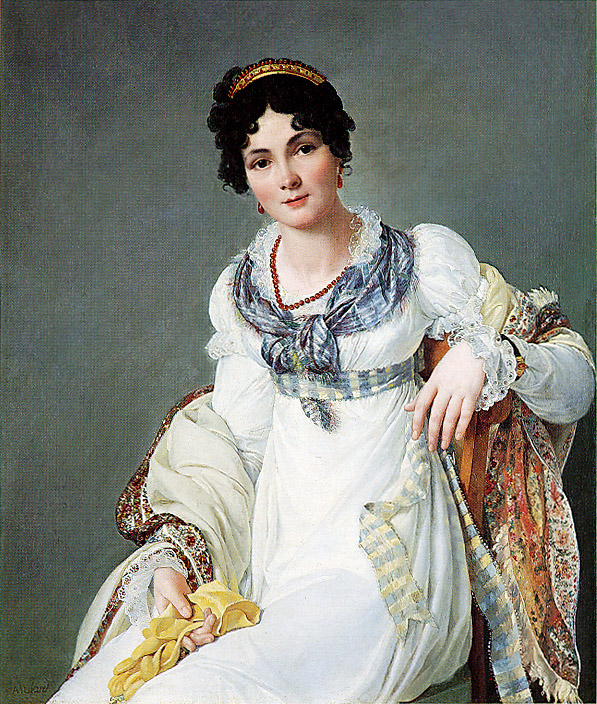
10 – 1810

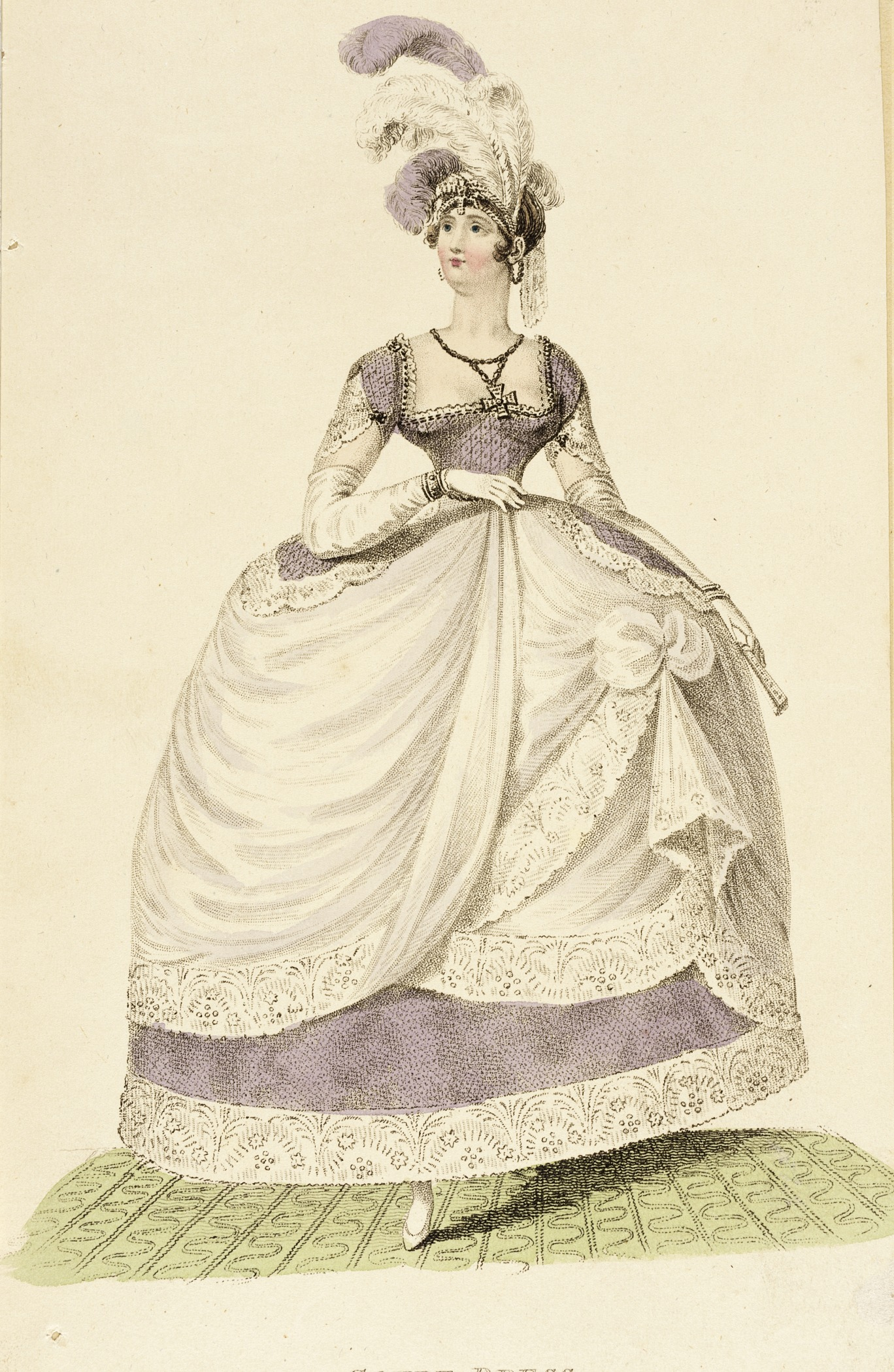
11 - 1810

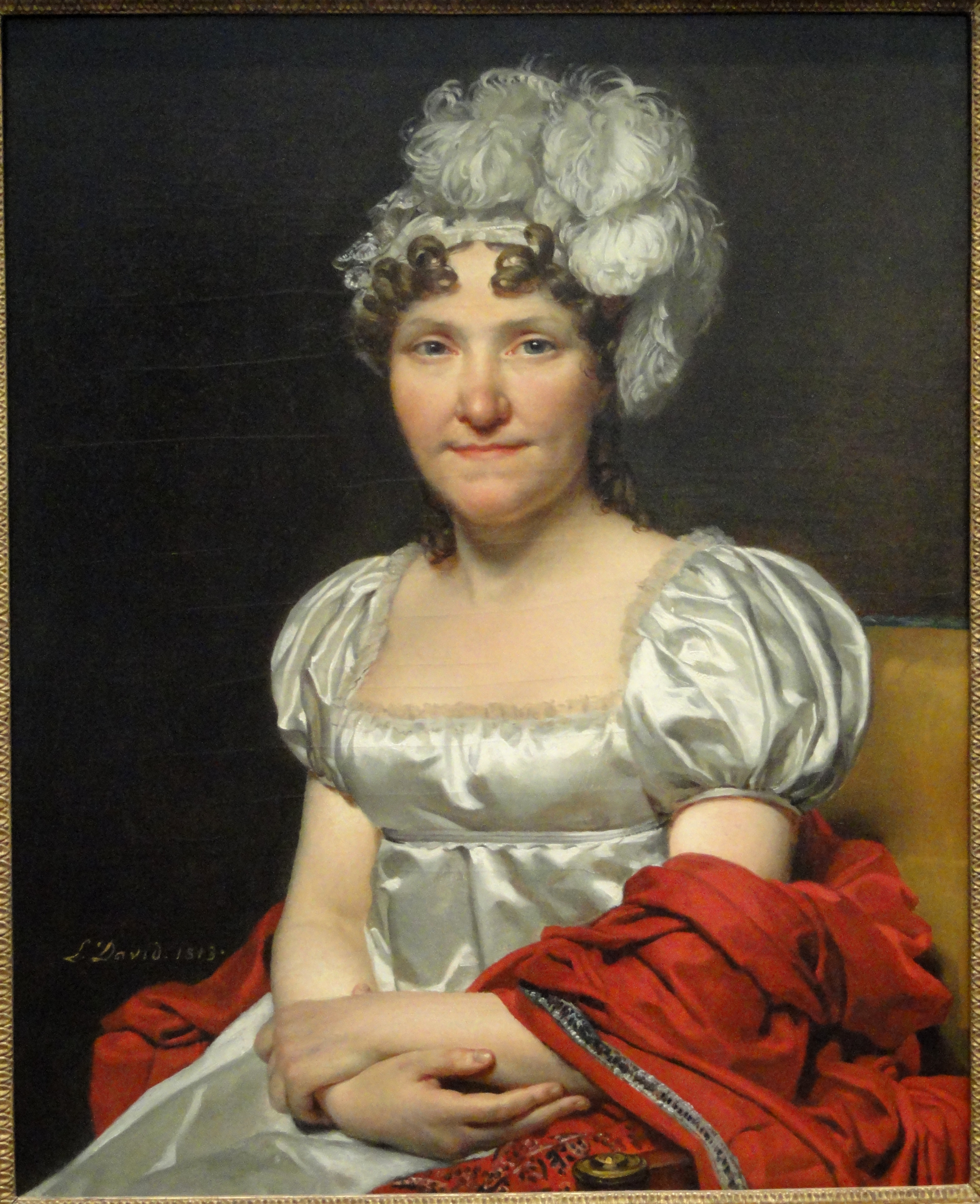
12 – 1813
1. Dolley Madison wears a short sleeved, light-pink dress with a high waistline. She also wears a thin, chain necklace, a golden-colored shawl, and her hair in a bun with loose waves; the simplicity, yet elegance, of her attire, is typical of the era.
2. 1804 French painting by Marguerite Gérard showing two different dresses, one more elaborate than the other. Note the low neckline then in fashion.
3. Paris Fashion of 1804. Note the even more generous neckline.
4. Conservative fashion: Mob cap of c. 1805 is pleated in the front and has a narrow frilled brim that widens to cover the ears. America.
5. Morning dress: Cotton Morning dress c. 1806.
6. Mrs. Harrison Gray Otis wears a dress with a sheer top layer over a partial lining and a patterned shawl. She wears a gold armlet on her left arm. Her hair is styled in loose waves at the temples and over her ears. Massachusetts, 1809.
7. 1809 gown worn with elbow-length gloves.
8. 1810 gown, shown with elbow-length gloves.
9. 1810 sketch of a woman in "Schute" bonnet and blue-striped dress with flounces.
10. Portrait of a woman by Henri Mulard, ca. 1810.
11. Fashion plate of a panniered English court gown, 1810.
12. Marguerite-Charlotte David wears a simple white satin gown and the ubiquitous shawl. Her headdress is trimmed with ostrich plumes.

===== Caricatures =====
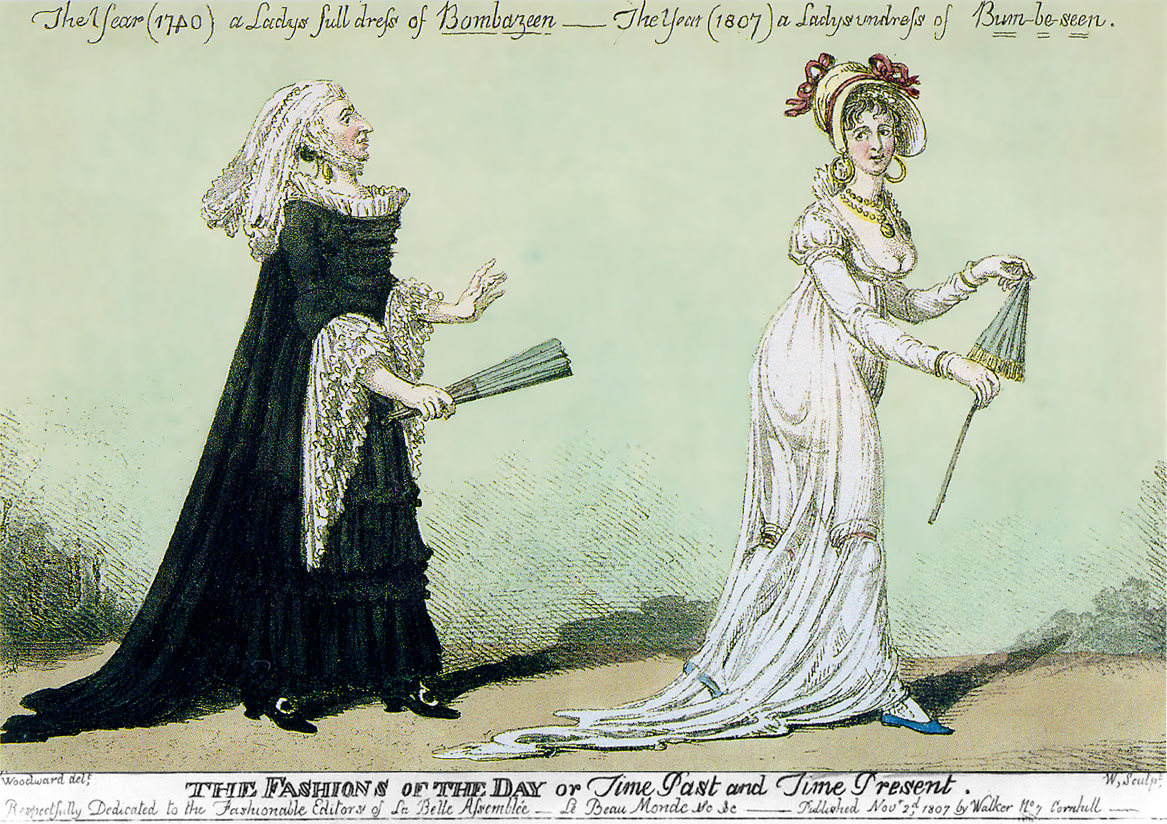
1 – 1807

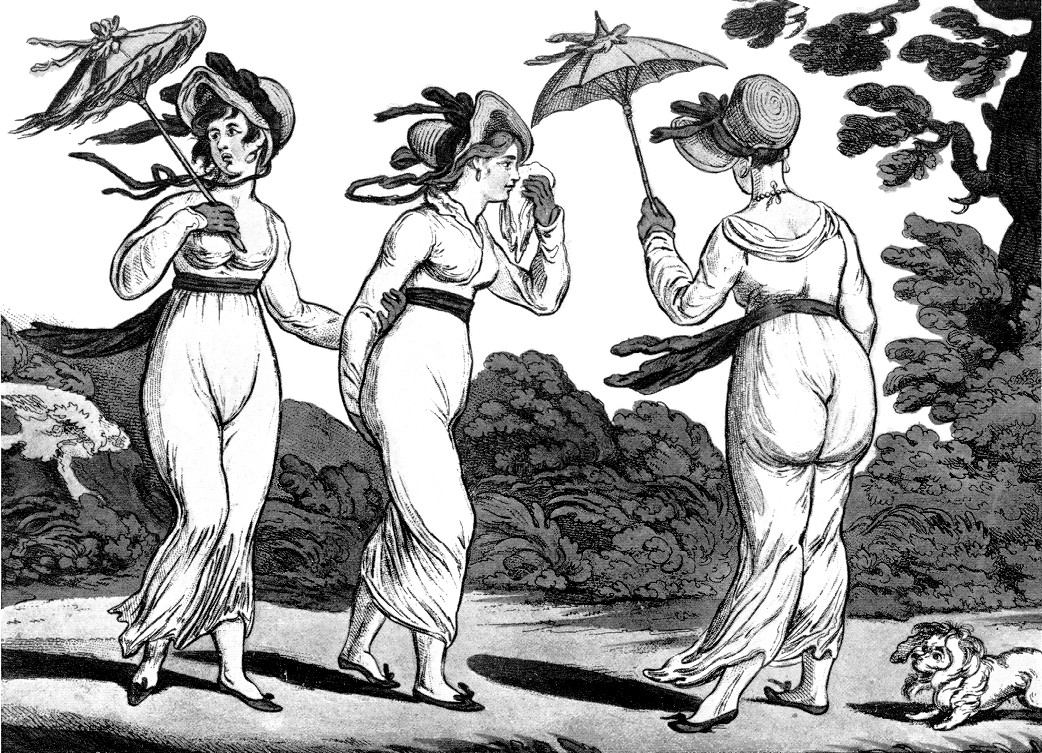
2 – 1810

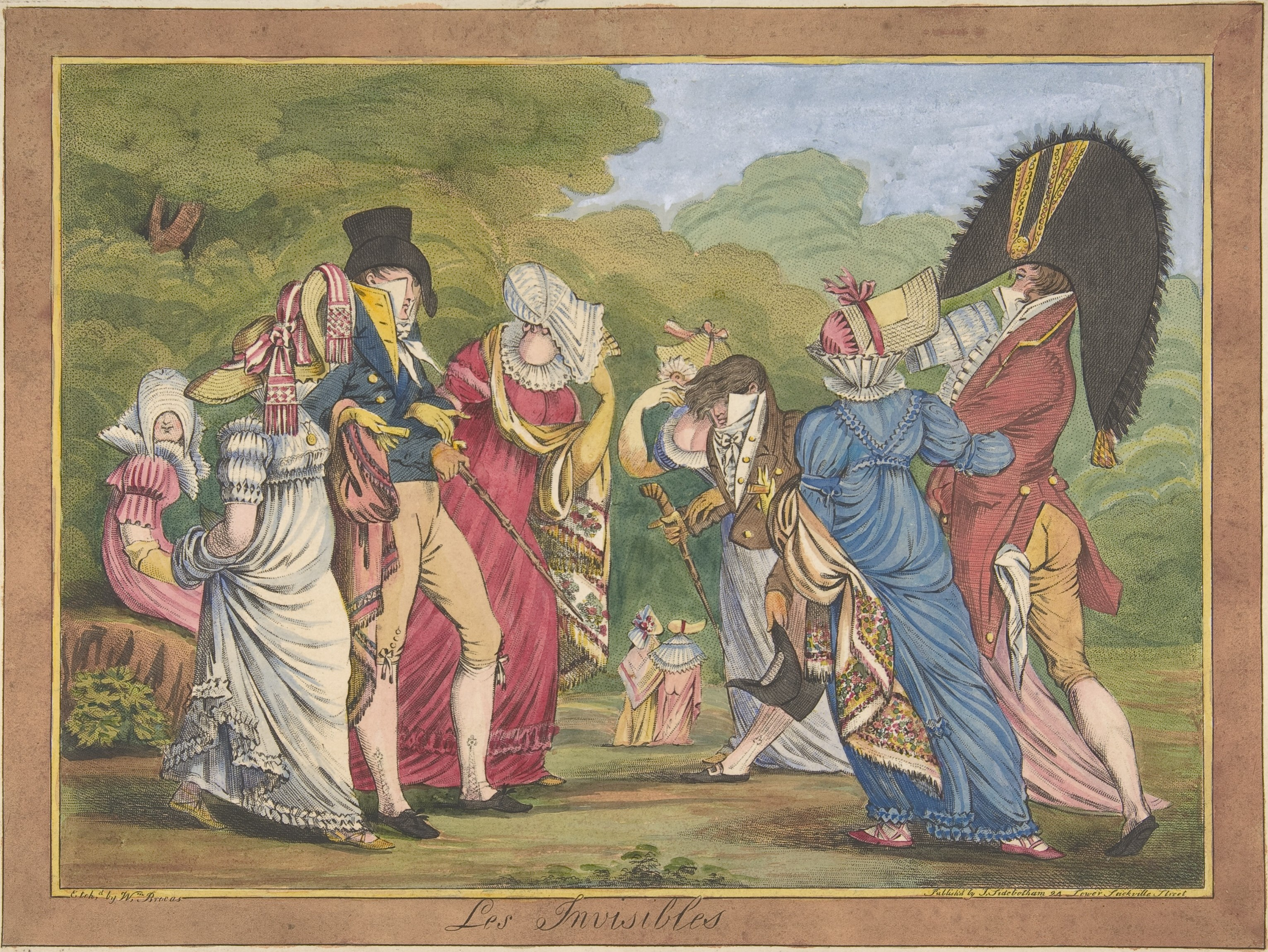
3 – 1810

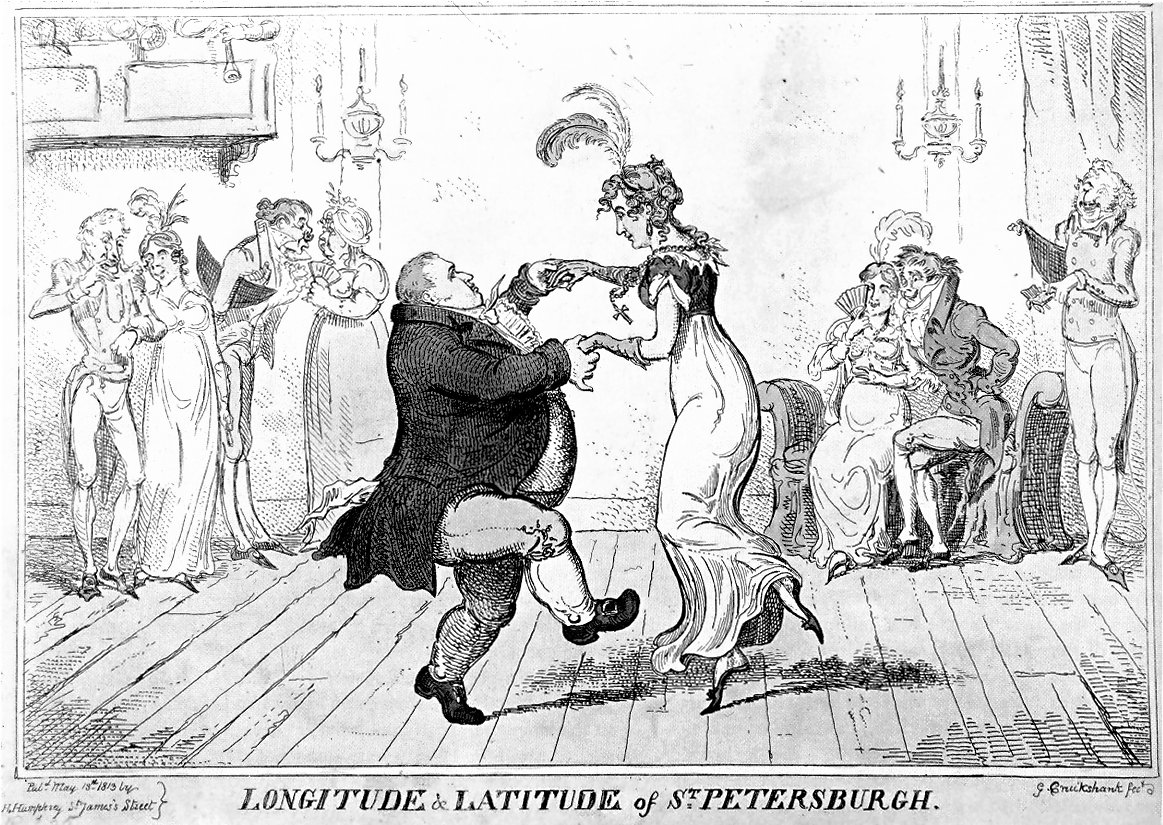
4 – 1813
1. "The Fashions of the Day, or Time Past and Present", a caricature purporting to show the provocative and revealing character of 1807 fashions as compared to those of the 18th century (deliberately exaggerating the contrast).
2. "Three Graces in a High Wind", 1810 caricature by Gillray. A satire of clinging dresses worn with few layers of petticoats beneath.
3. "The Invisible Ones", 1810 caricature of impractical hat styles.
4. "Almack's Longitude and Latitude", 1813 caricature by George Cruikshank.

=== Regency (1815–1820) gallery ===
This era signaled the loss of any lingering neoclassical, pseudo-Grecian styles in women's dress. This decline was especially evident in France due to the Emperor Napoleon's suppression of trade in the fabrics used in neoclassical dress. While waistlines were still high, they were beginning to drop slightly. Larger and more abundant decoration, especially near the hem and neckline foreshadowed greater extravagance in the coming years. More petticoats were being worn, and a stiffer, more cone-shaped skirt became popular. Stiffness could be supplemented by layers of ruffles and tucks on a hem, as well as corded or flounced petticoats. Sleeves began to be pulled, tied, and pinched in ways that were more influenced by romantic and gothic styles than neoclassical. Hats and hairstyles became more elaborate and trimmed, climbing higher to balance widening skirts.

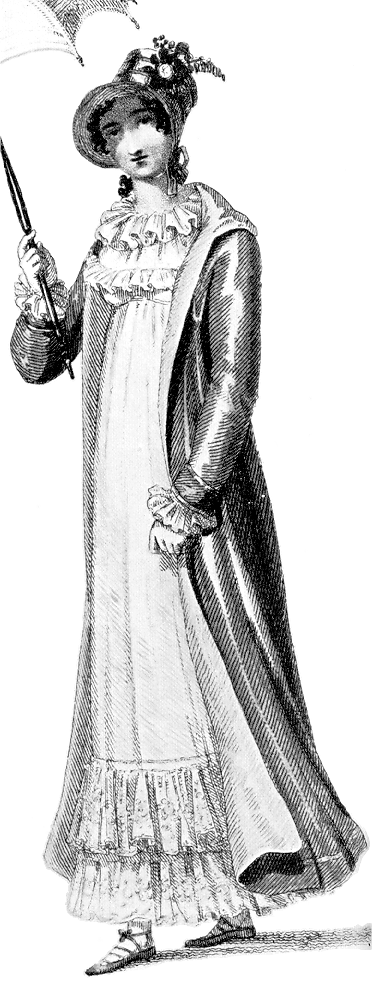
1 – 1815

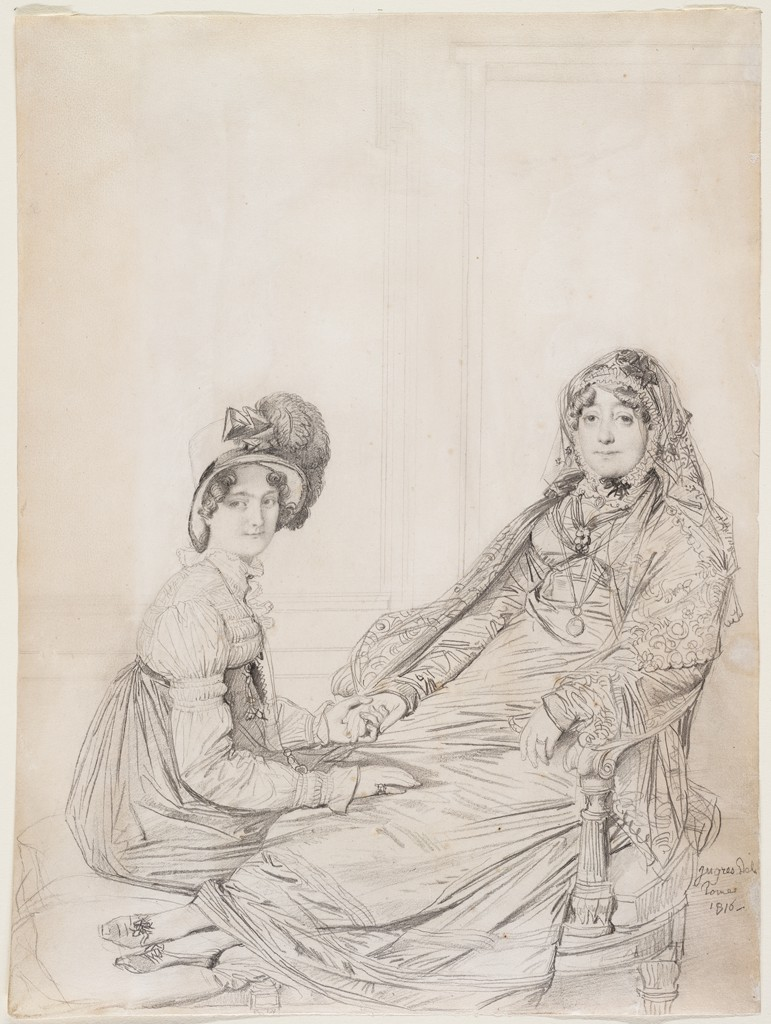
2 – 1815

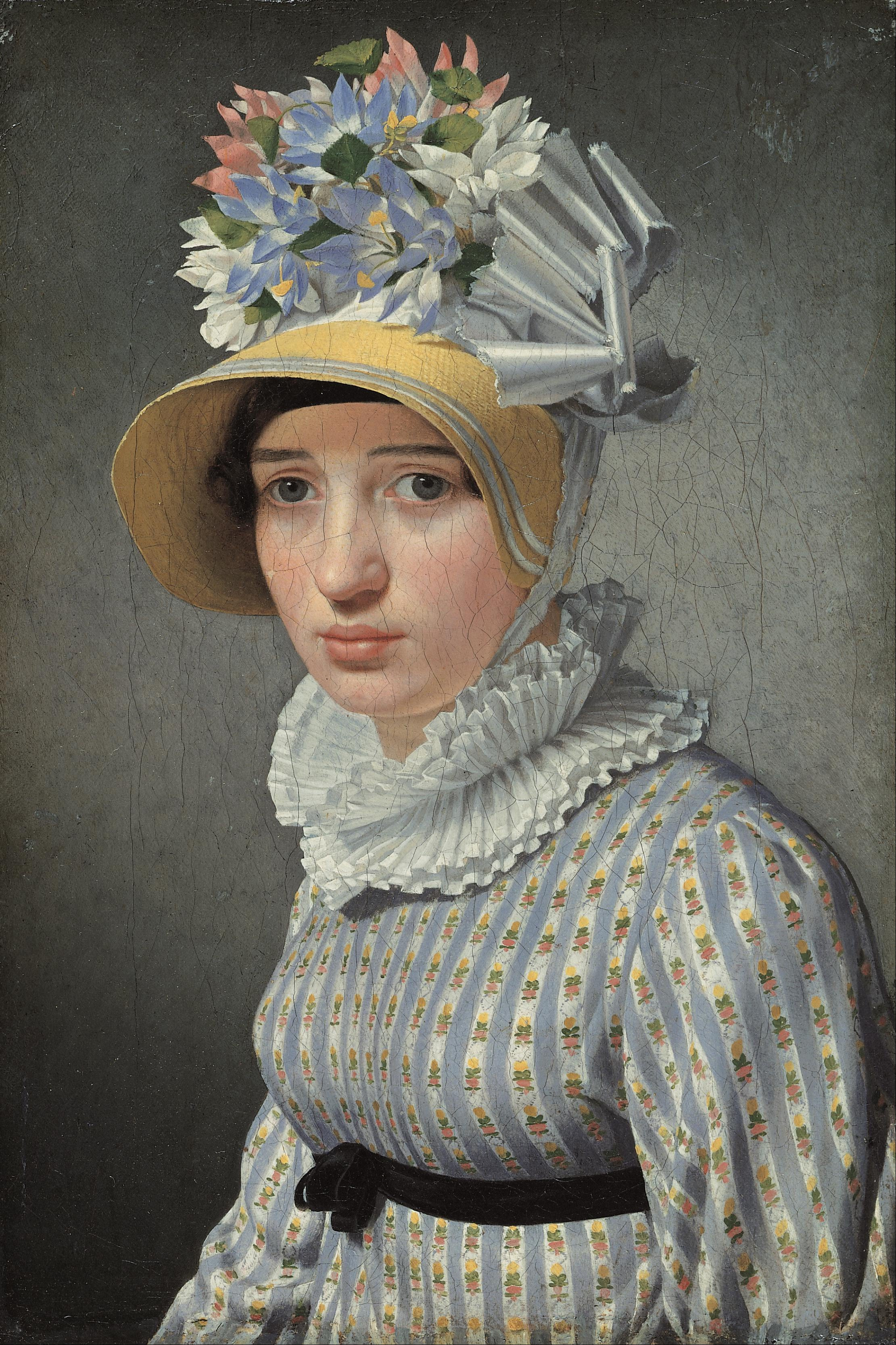
3 – 1815

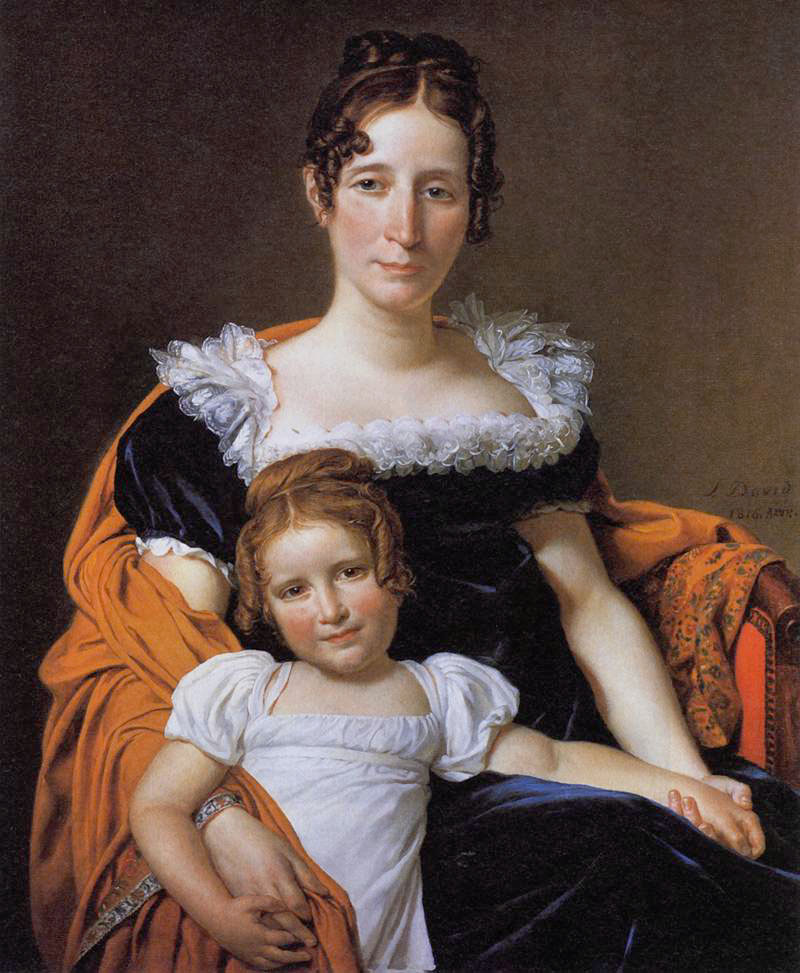
4 – 1816

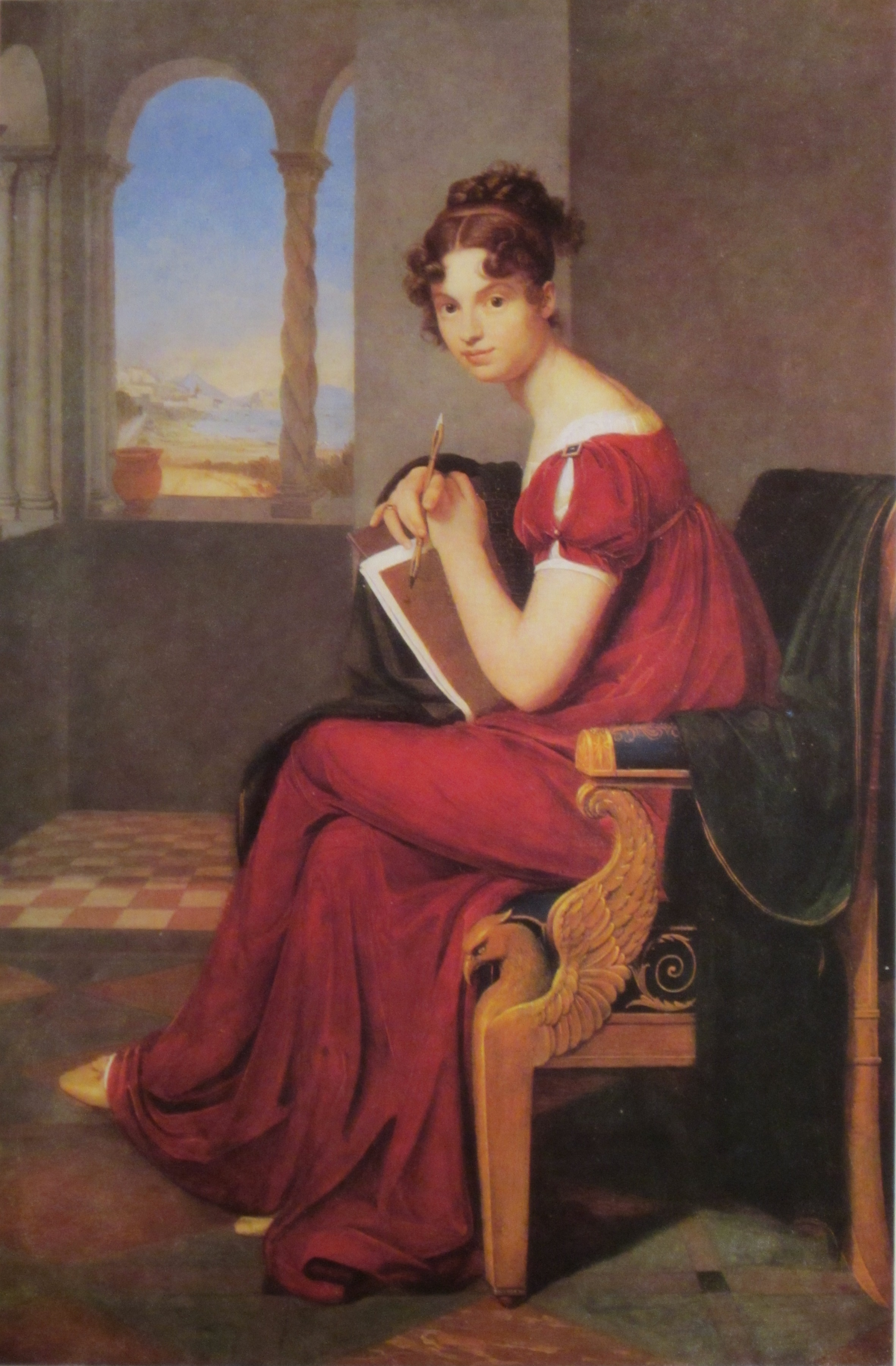
5 – 1816

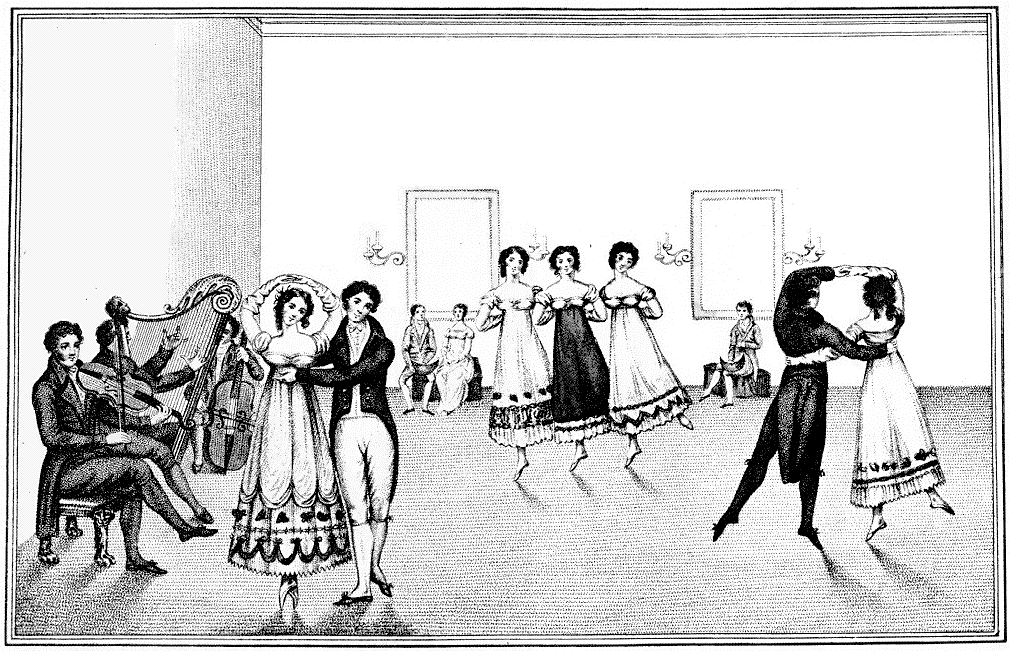
6 – 1817

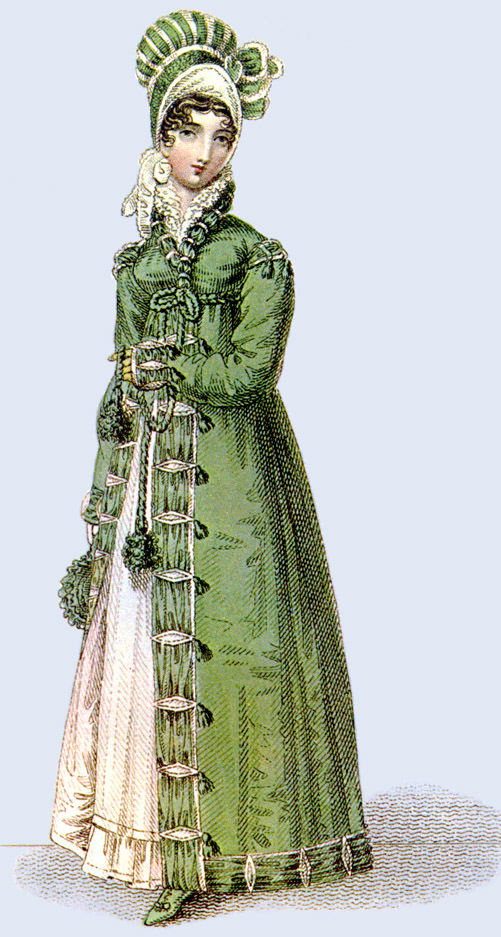
7 – 1817

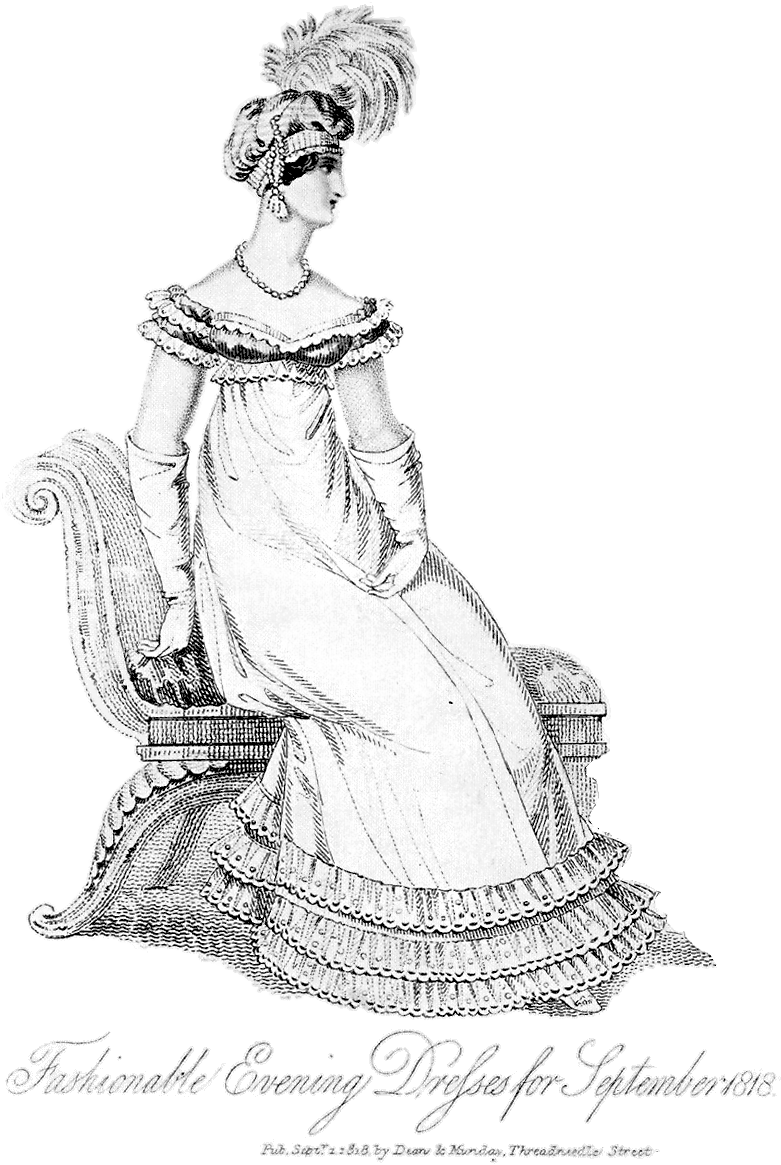
8 – 1818

9 – 1818

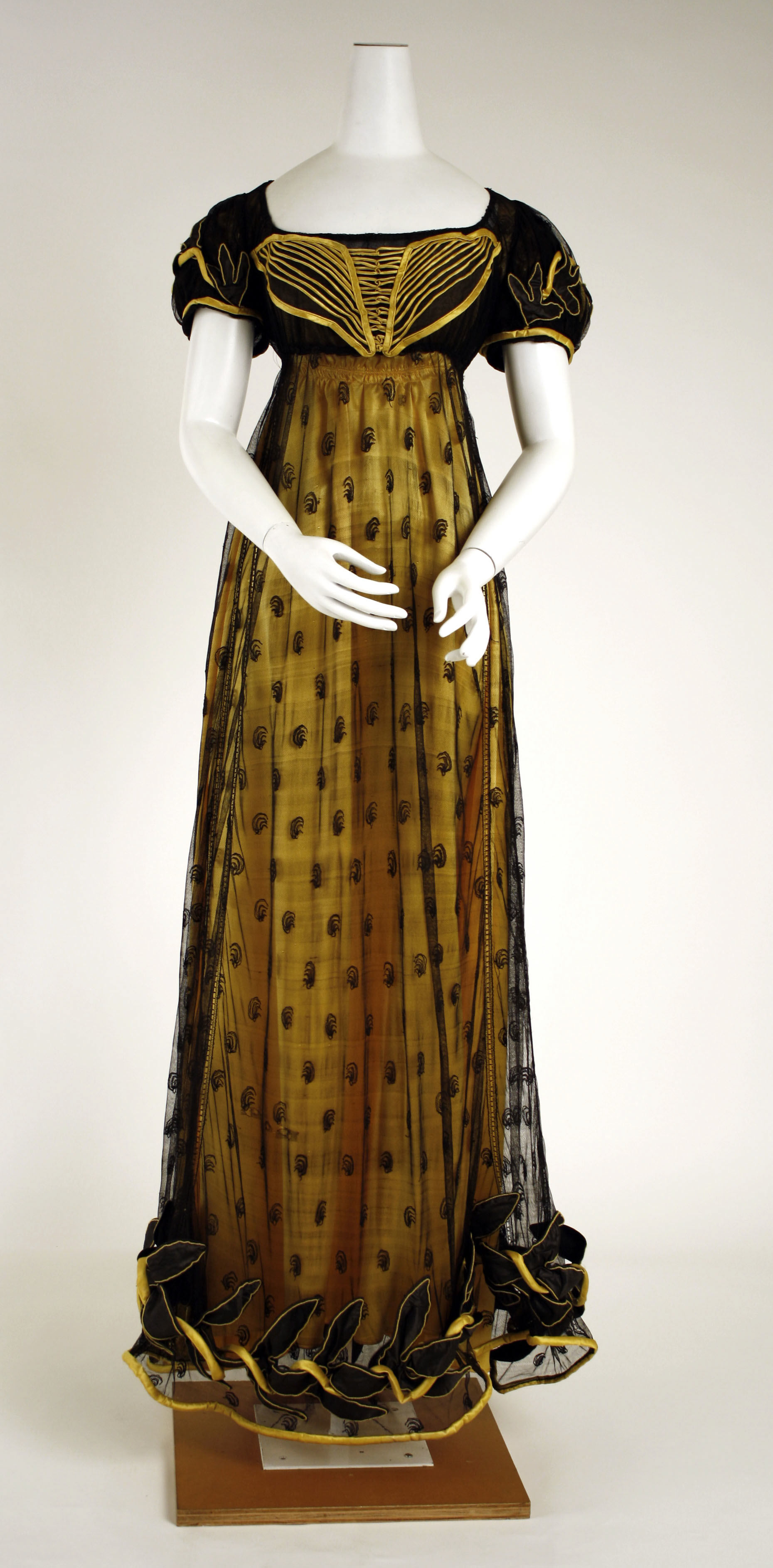
10 – 1818

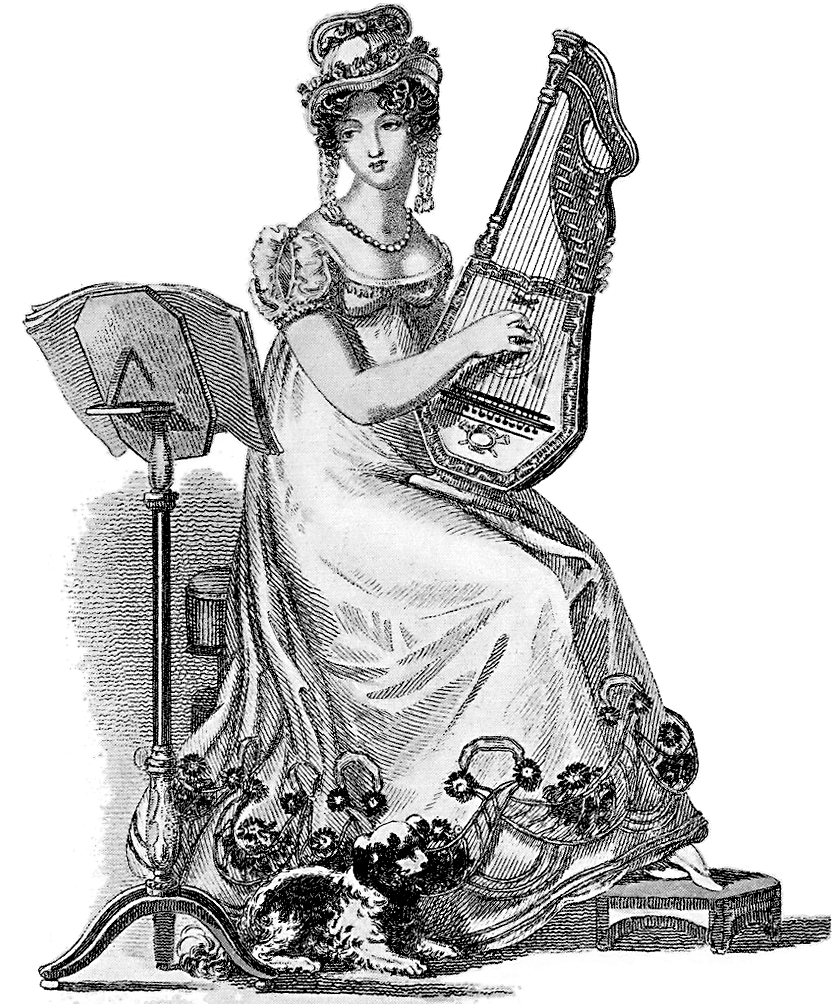
11 – 1819

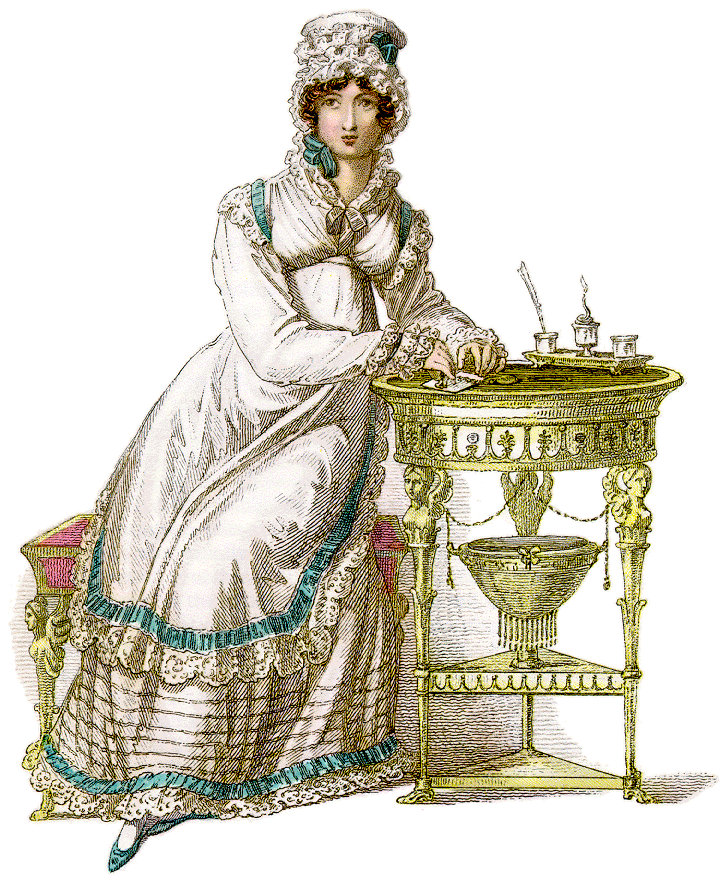
12 – 1819
1. 1815 walking costume
2. 1816 day dresses
3. Italian woman with an ornate hat. 1816.
4. Comtesse Vilain and her daughter wear their hair parted in the front center with tight ringlets over each ear; back hair is brushed back into a bun. 1816.
5. Countess Thekla Ludolf wears a red dress over a white chemise. 1816.
6. 1817 dancing illustration, showing the beginning of the trend towards a conical silhouette.
7. 1817 walking costume is heavily trimmed and tasseled.
8. 1818 gown
9. Mary Lodge wears the new fashion for rich color. Her crimson gown with frills at neck and sleeves is worn with an ivory shawl with a wide paisley-patterned border, 1818.
10. 1818 gown
11. 1819 gown, with ornamentation near the hem.
12. "Morning dress" (for staying inside the house during the mornings and early afternoons), 1819.

==== Caricature ====
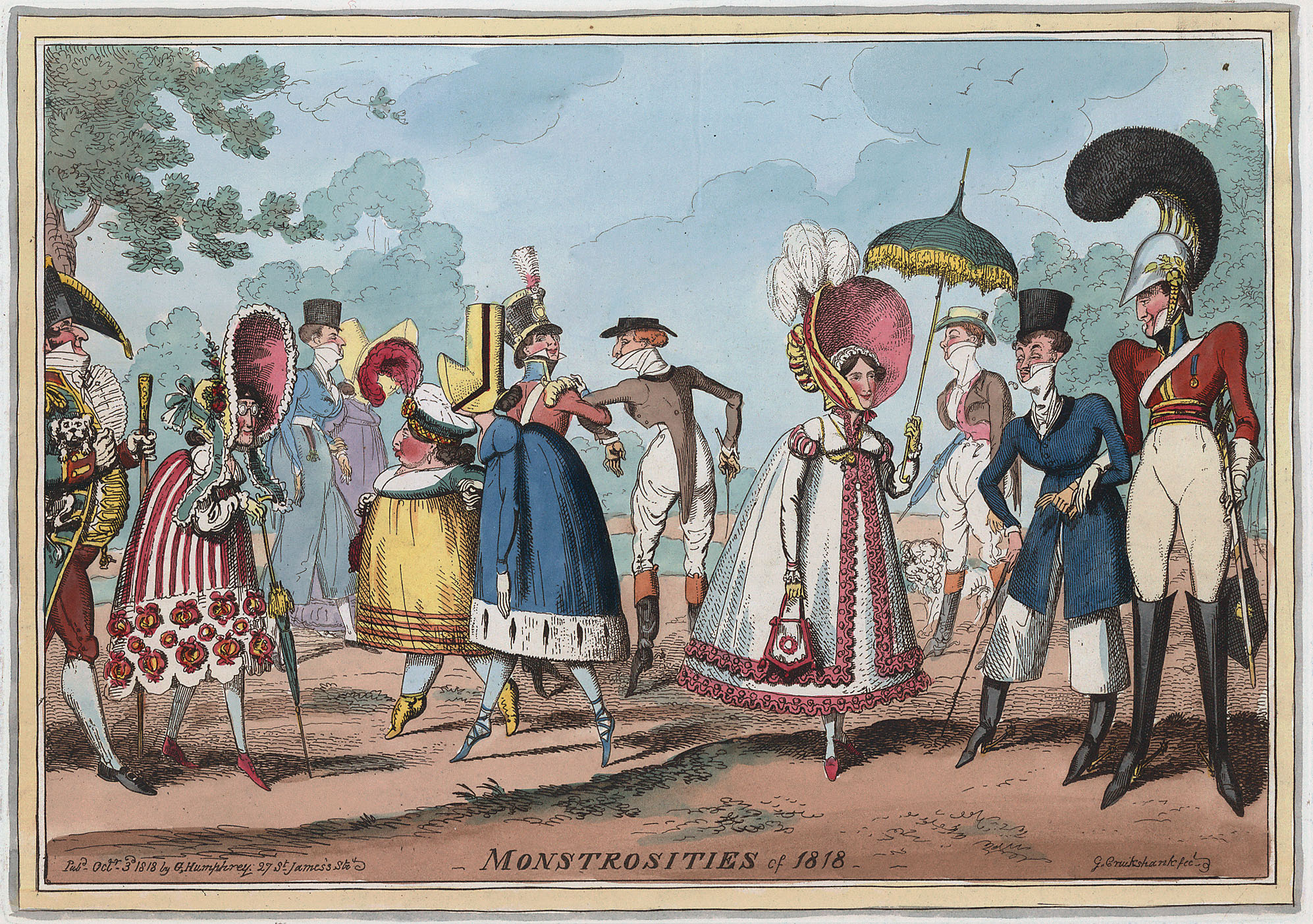
1 – 1818

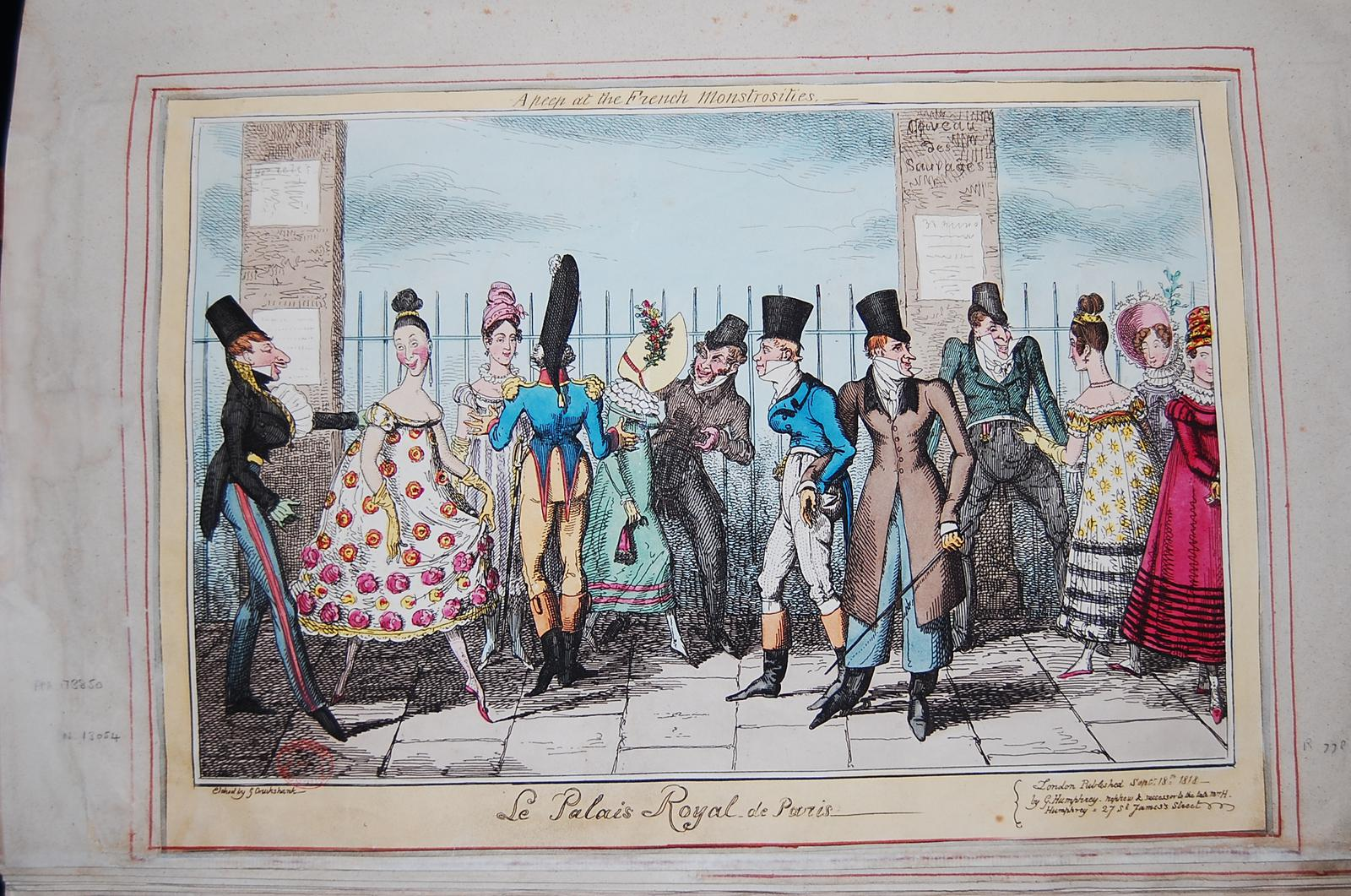
2 – French fashion 1818
1. "Monstrosities of 1818", a satire by George Cruikshank of the female trend towards a conical silhouette, and male high cravats and dandyism.
2. "A peep at the French Monstrosities", a French fashion satire by George Cruikshank.

=== Russian fashion ===
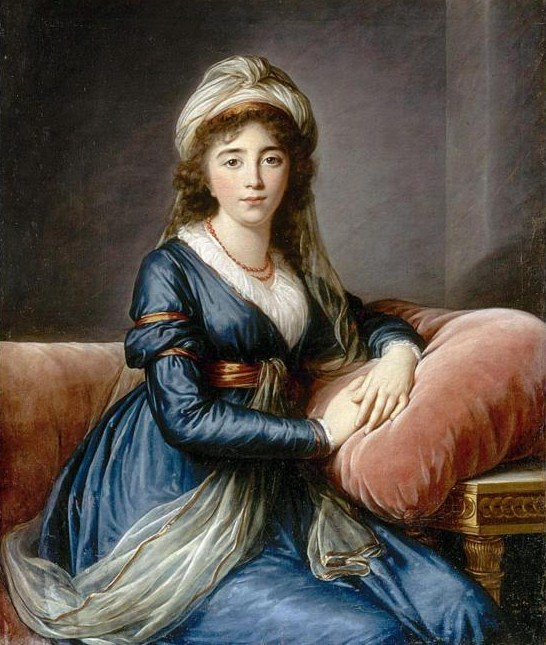
Russia, 1796

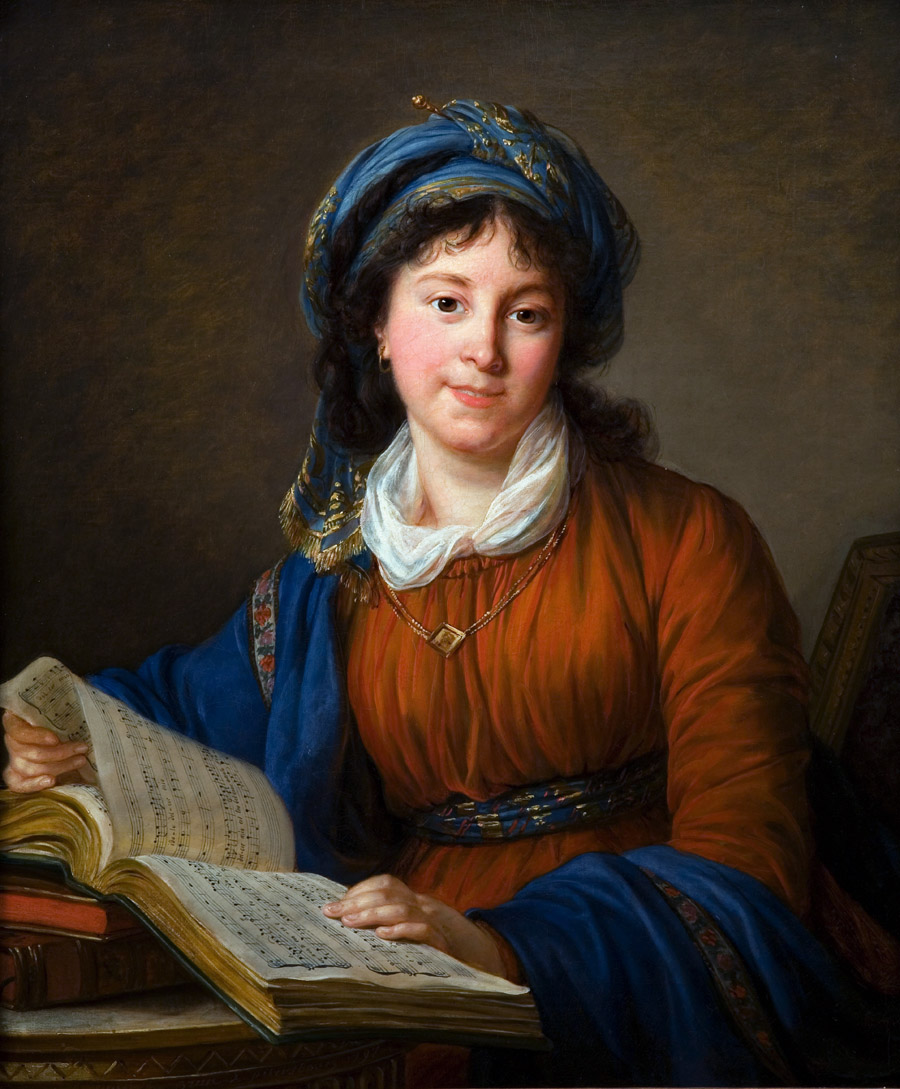
Russia, 1797

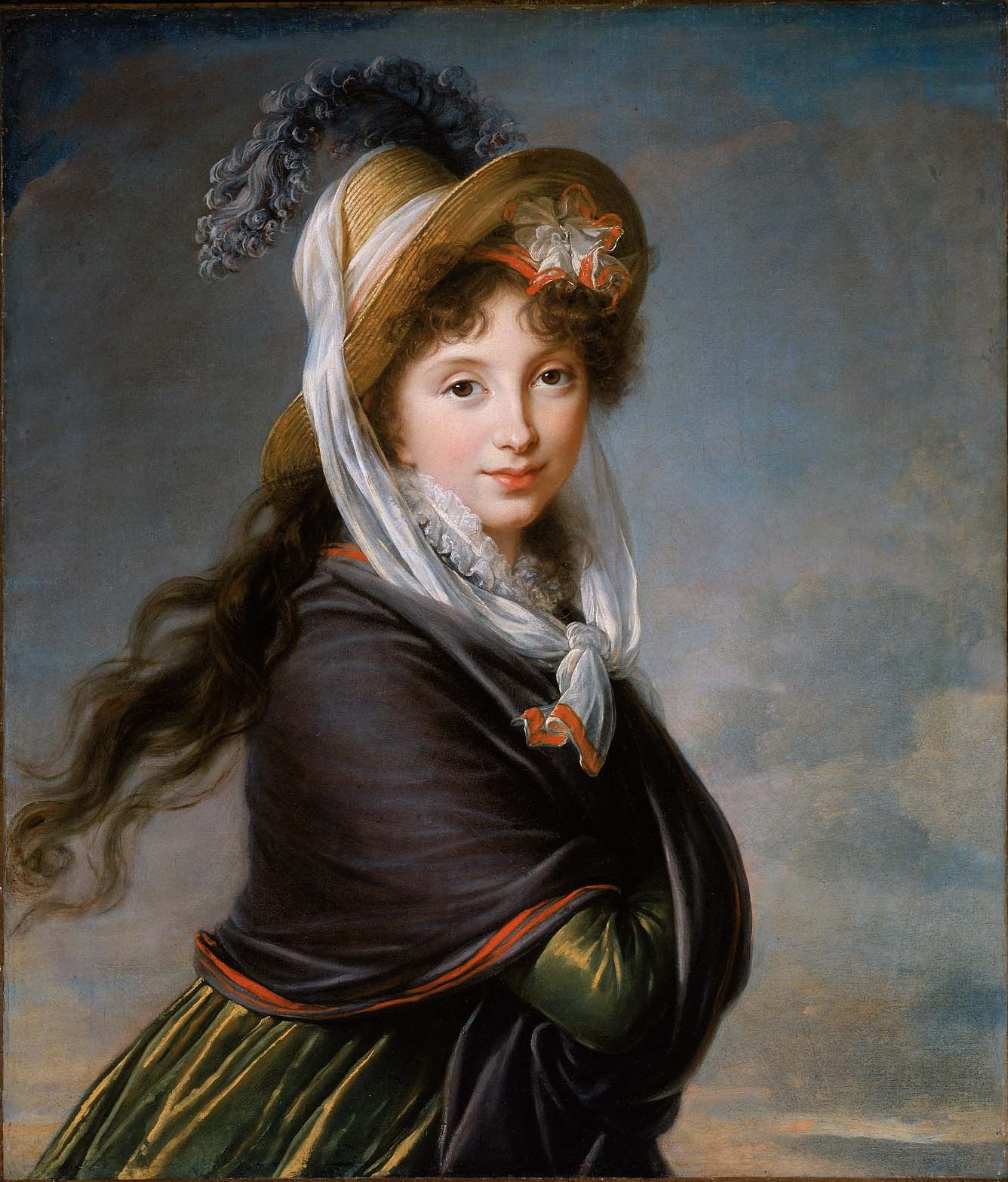
Russia, 1797

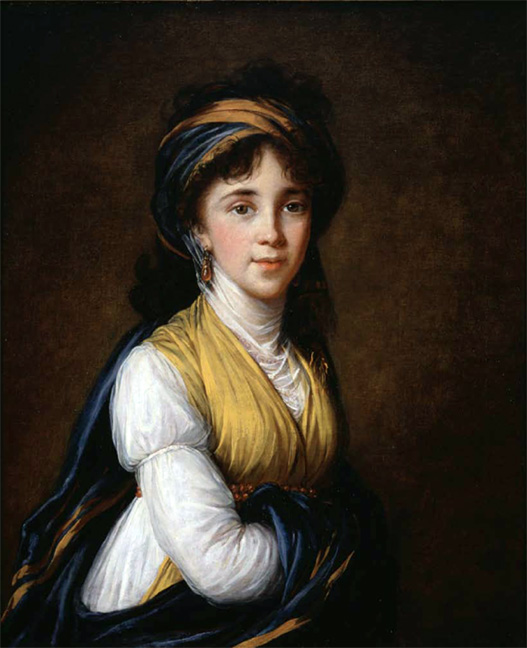
Russia, 1798

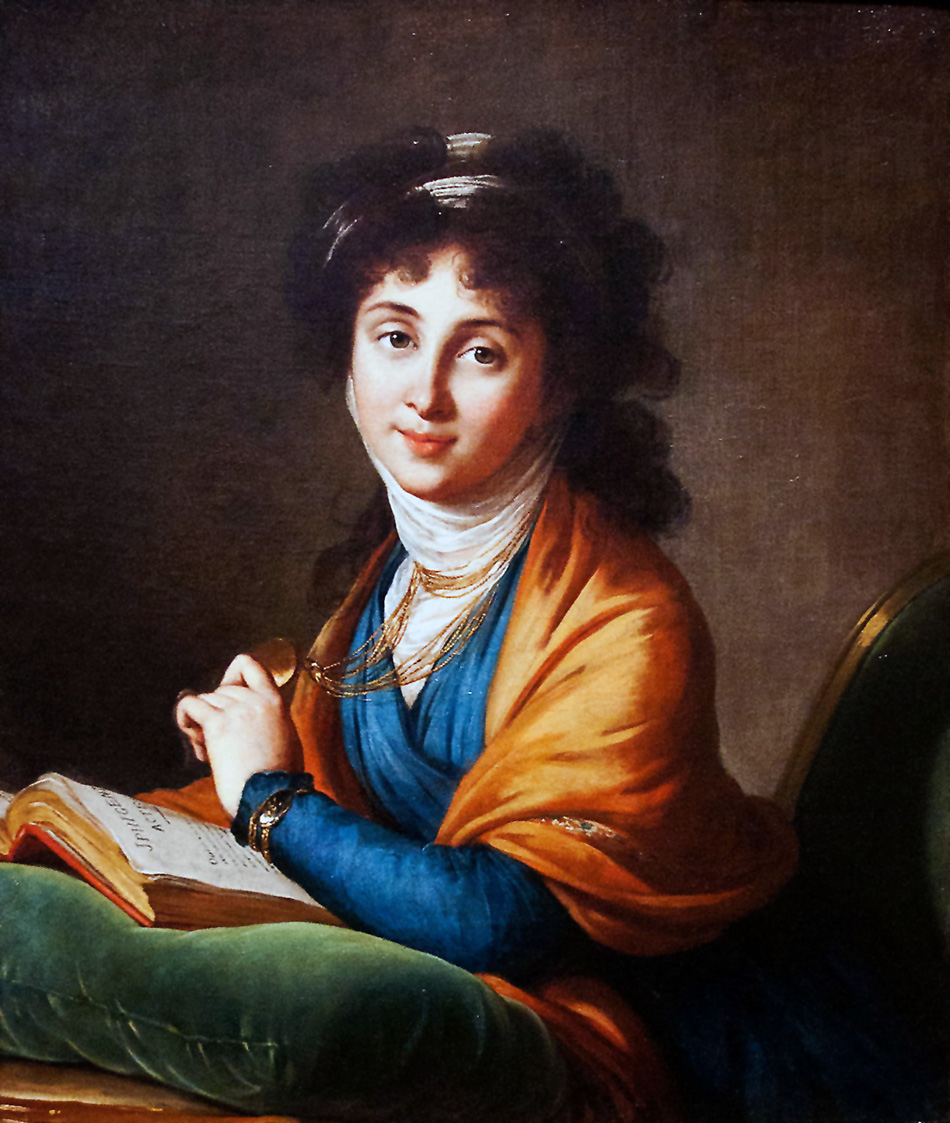
Russia, 1799

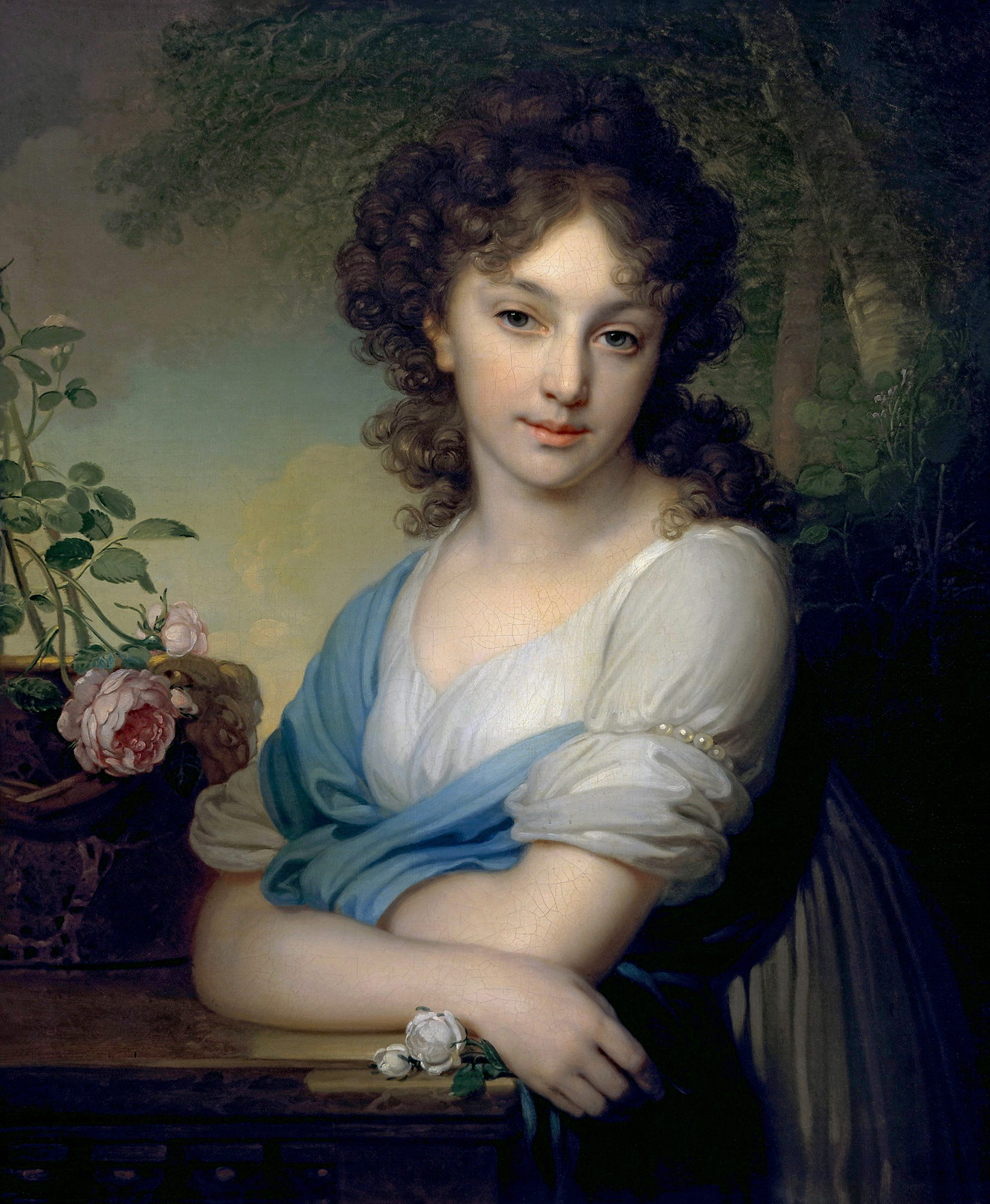
Russia, 1799

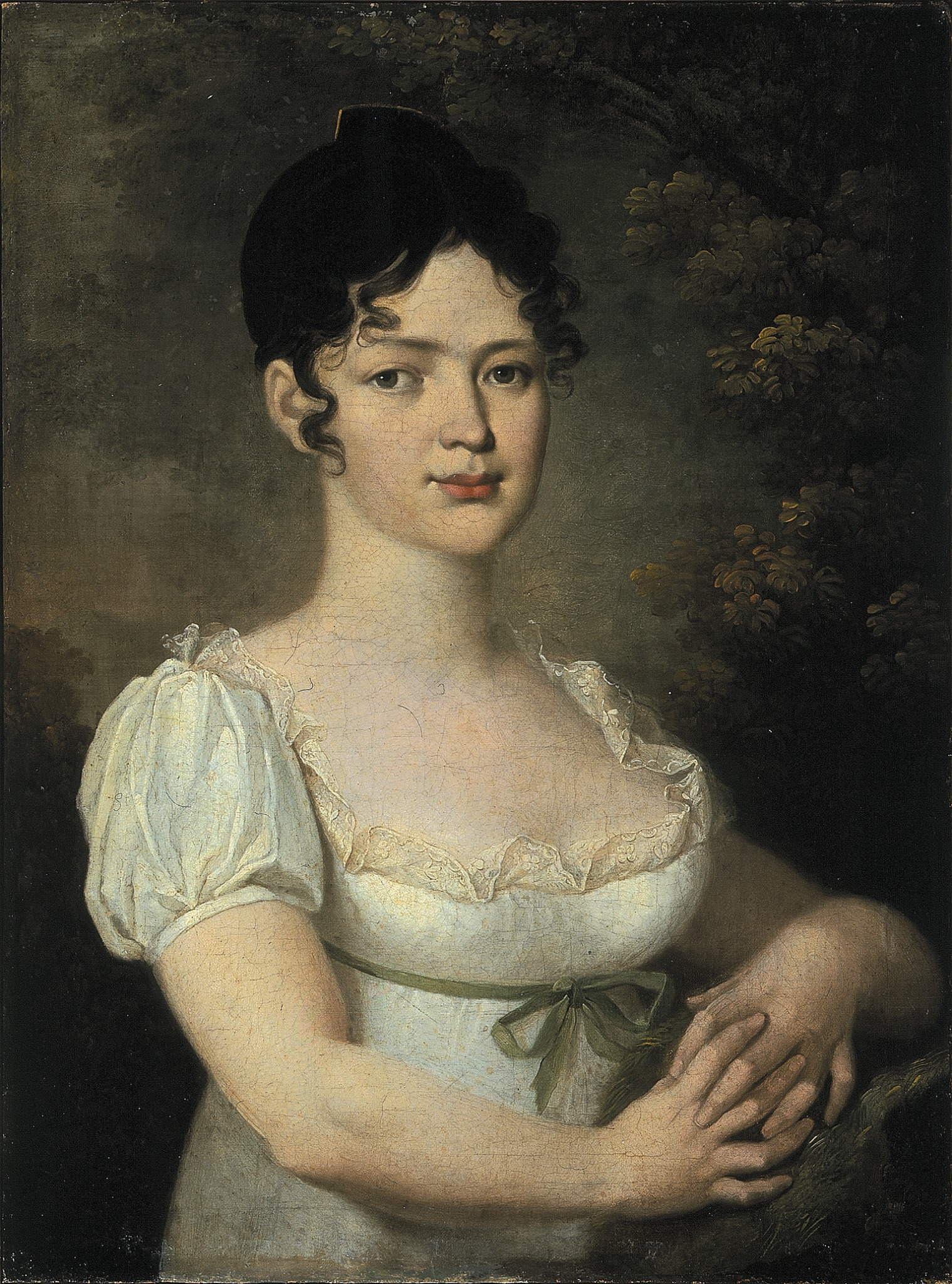
Russia, 1809

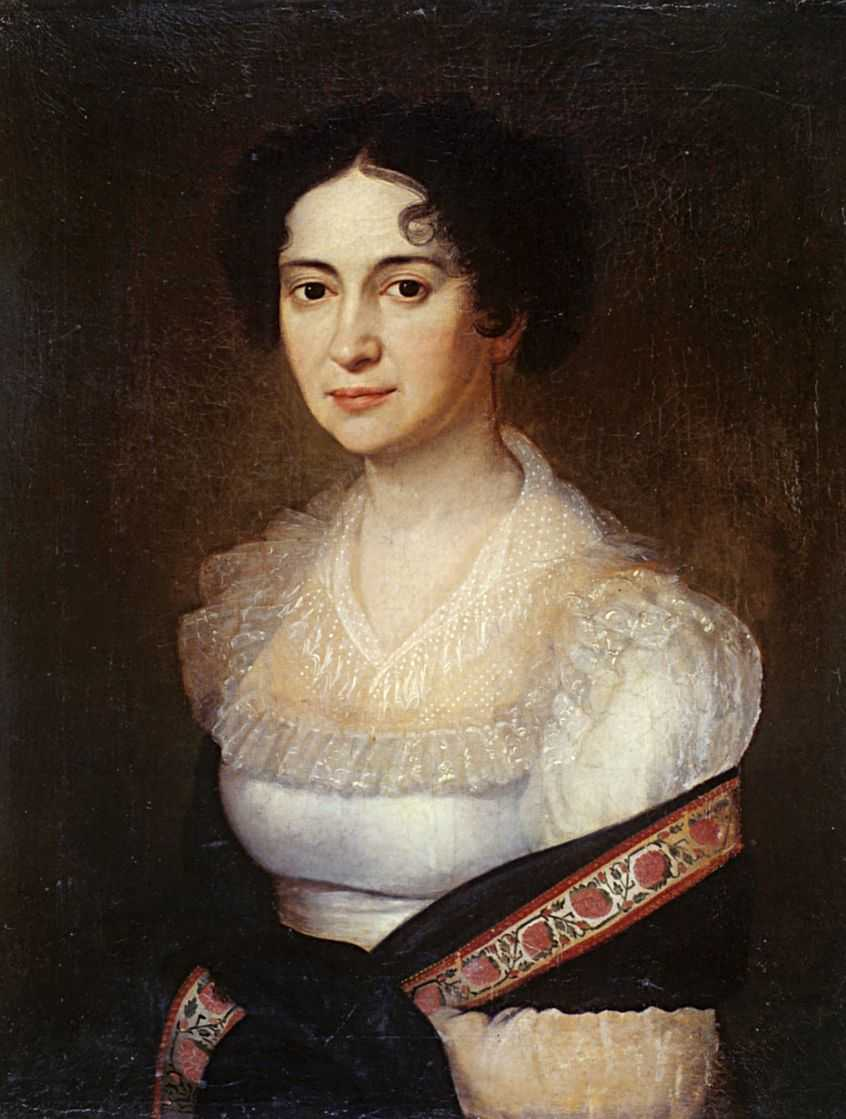
Russia, 1810

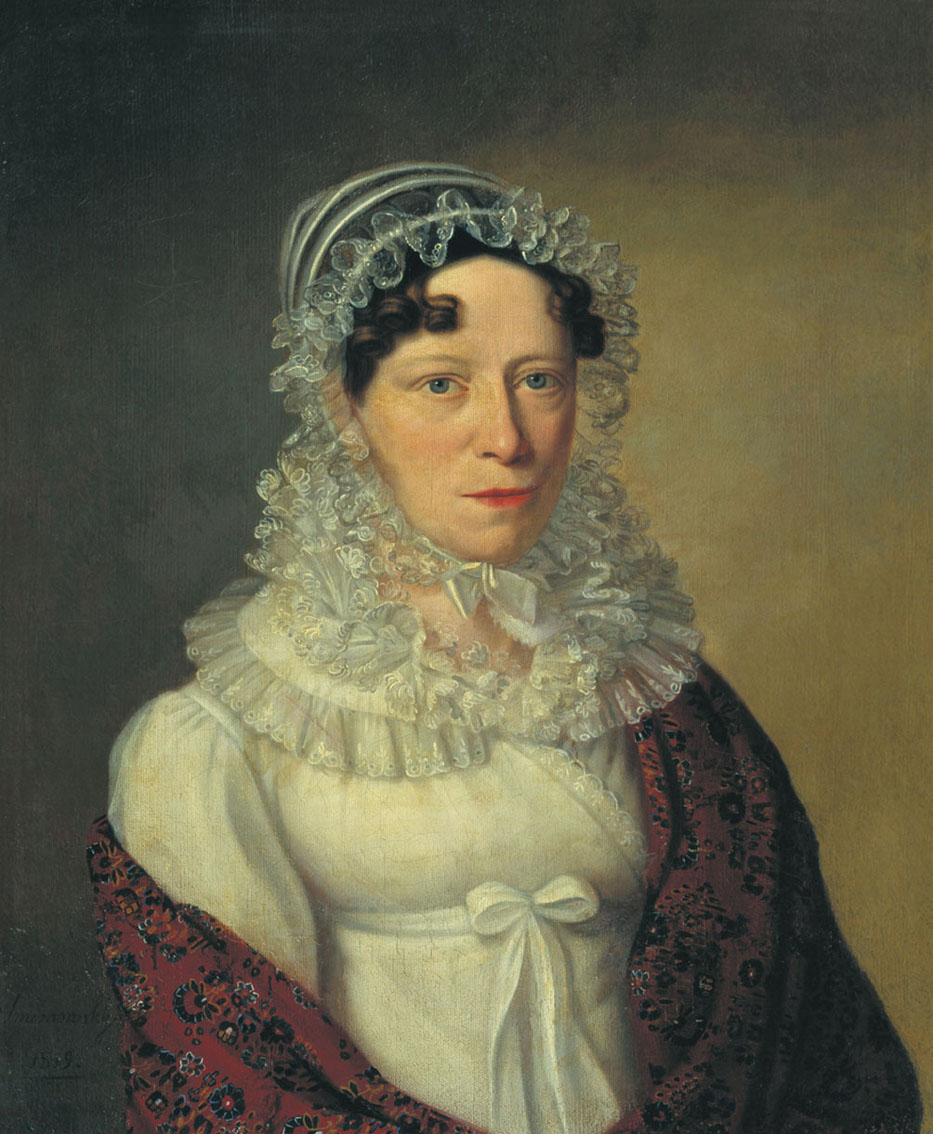
Russia, 1819

=== Spanish fashion ===
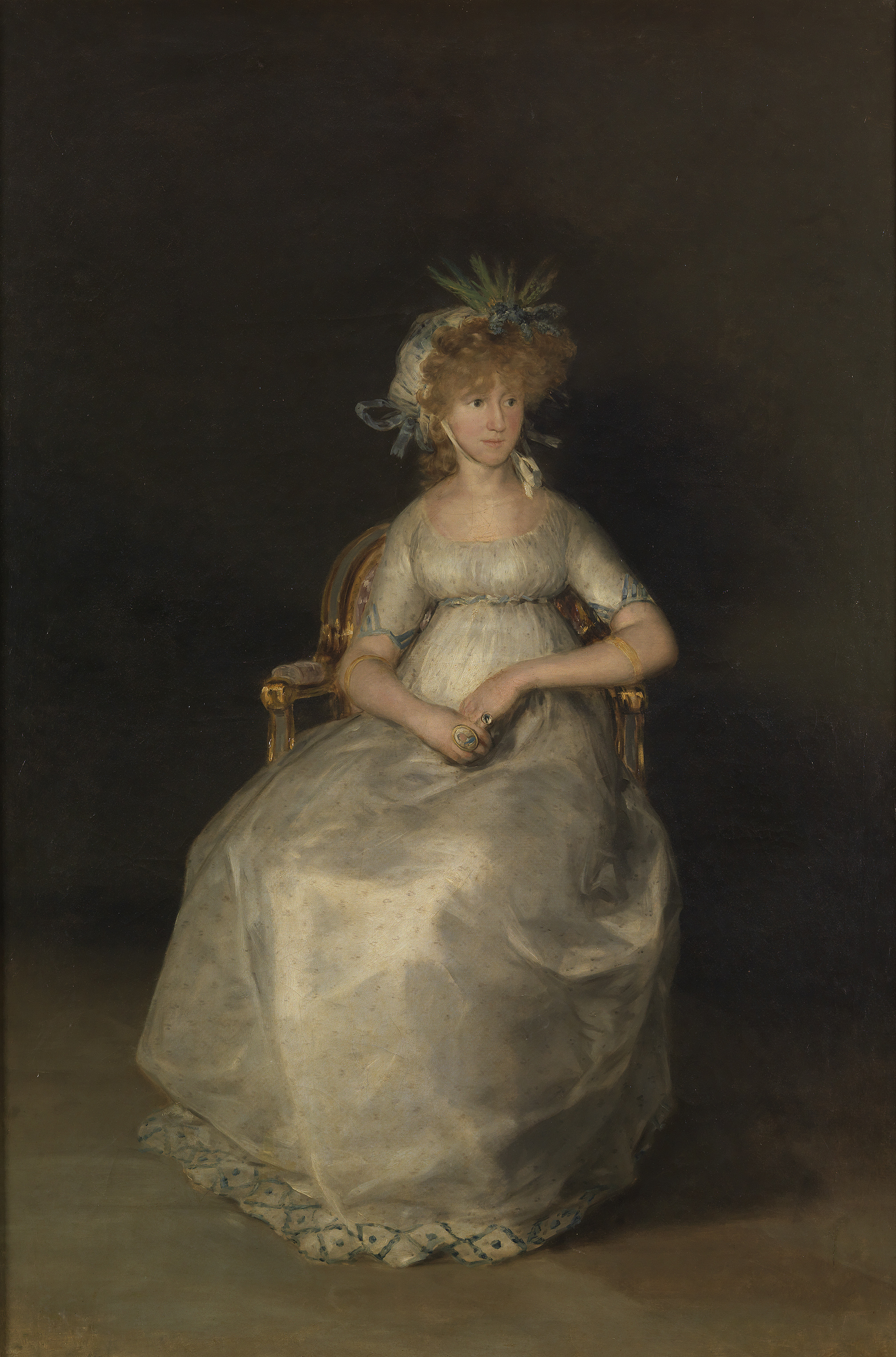
Spain, 1800

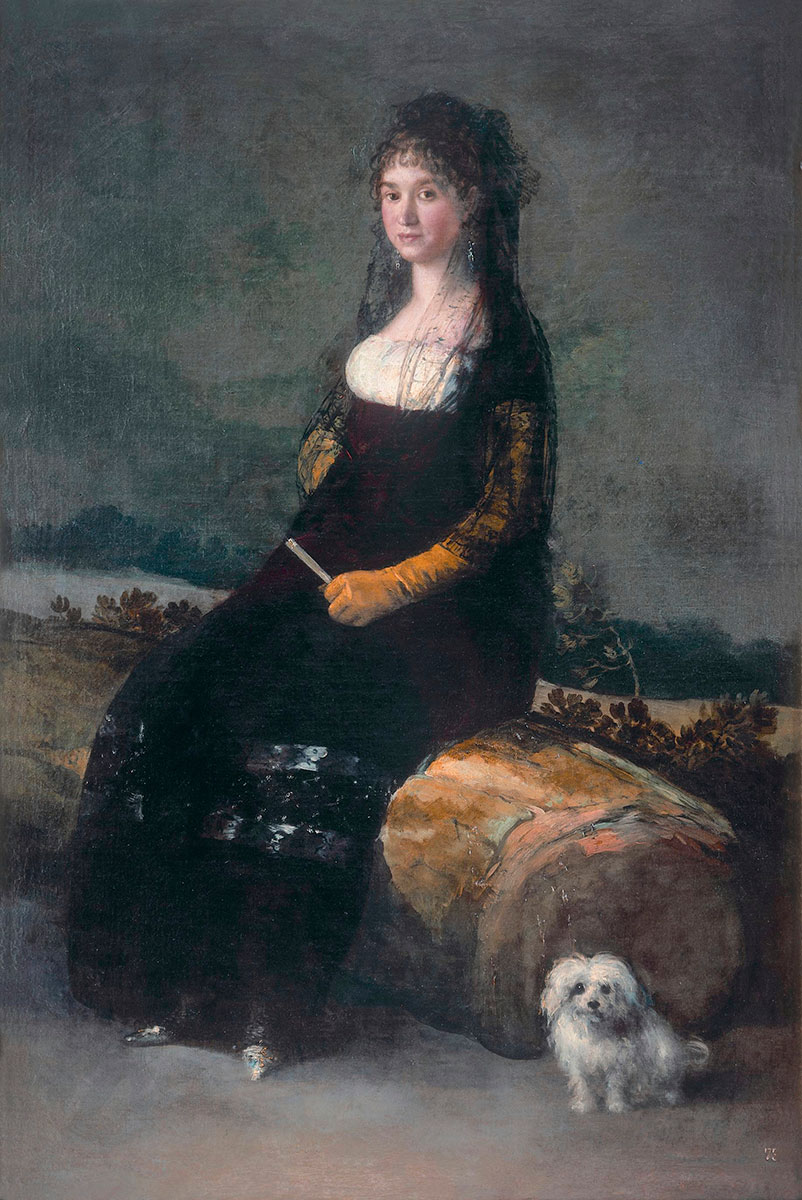
Spain, 1802

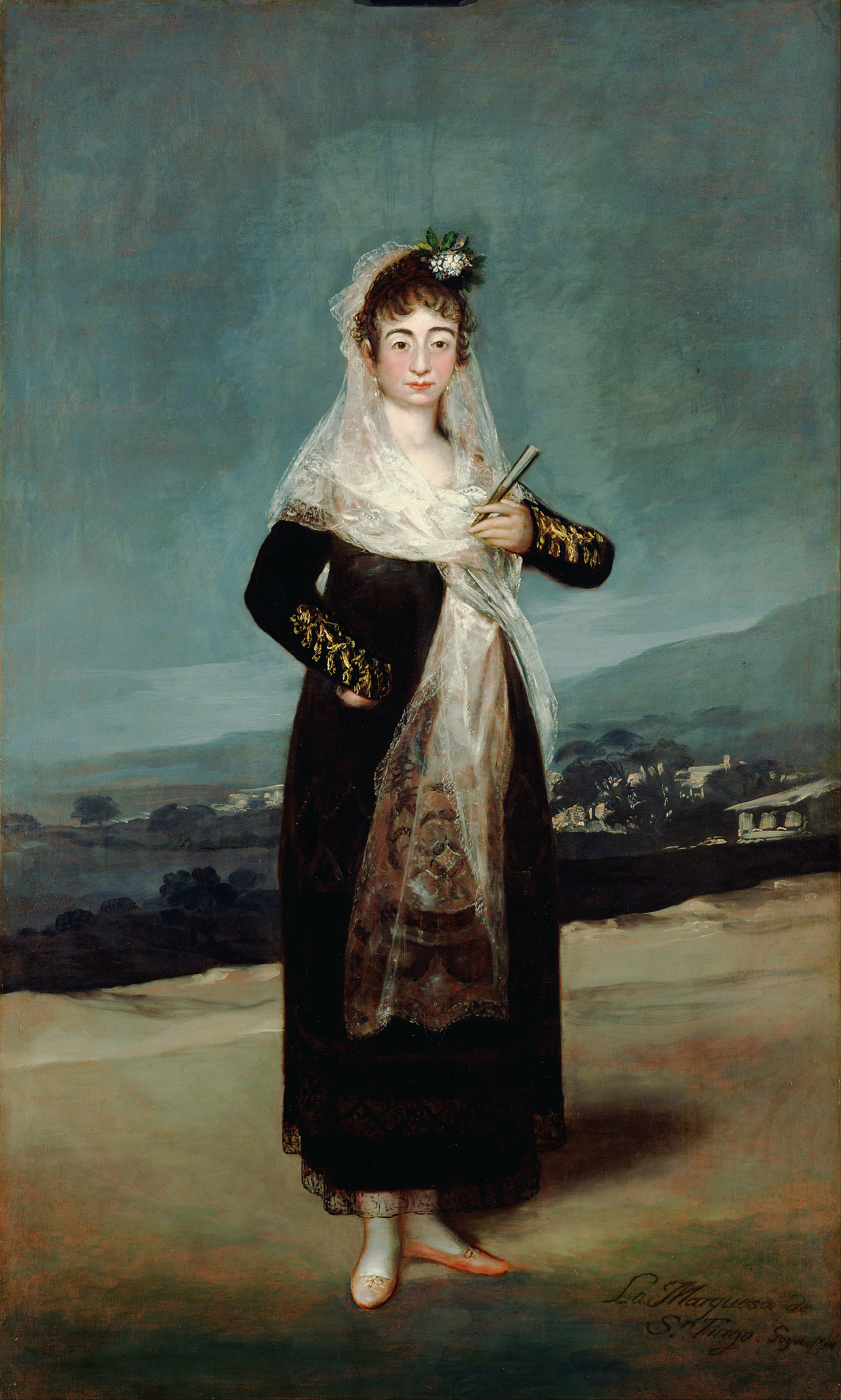
Spain, 1804

Spain, 1805

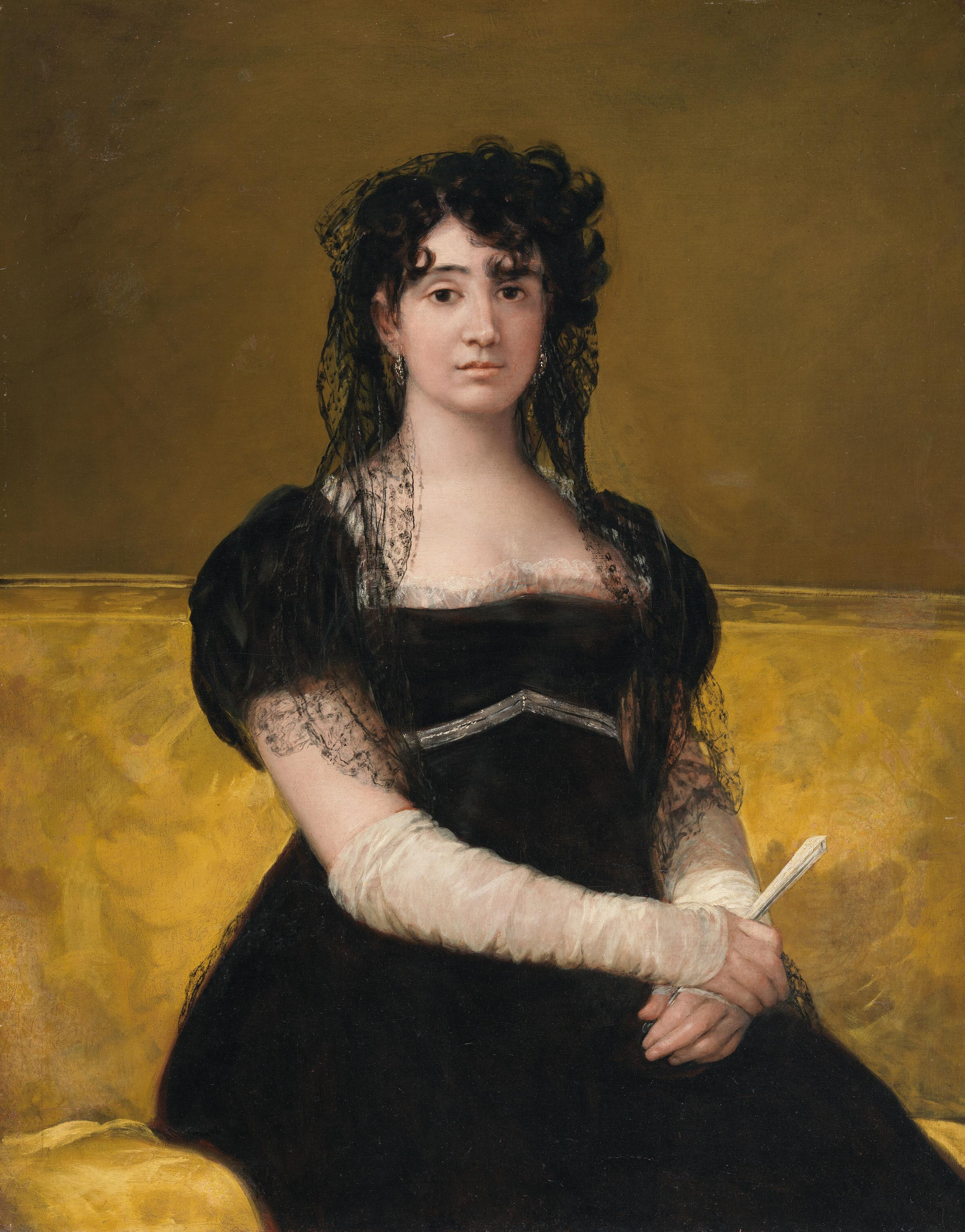
Spain, 1805

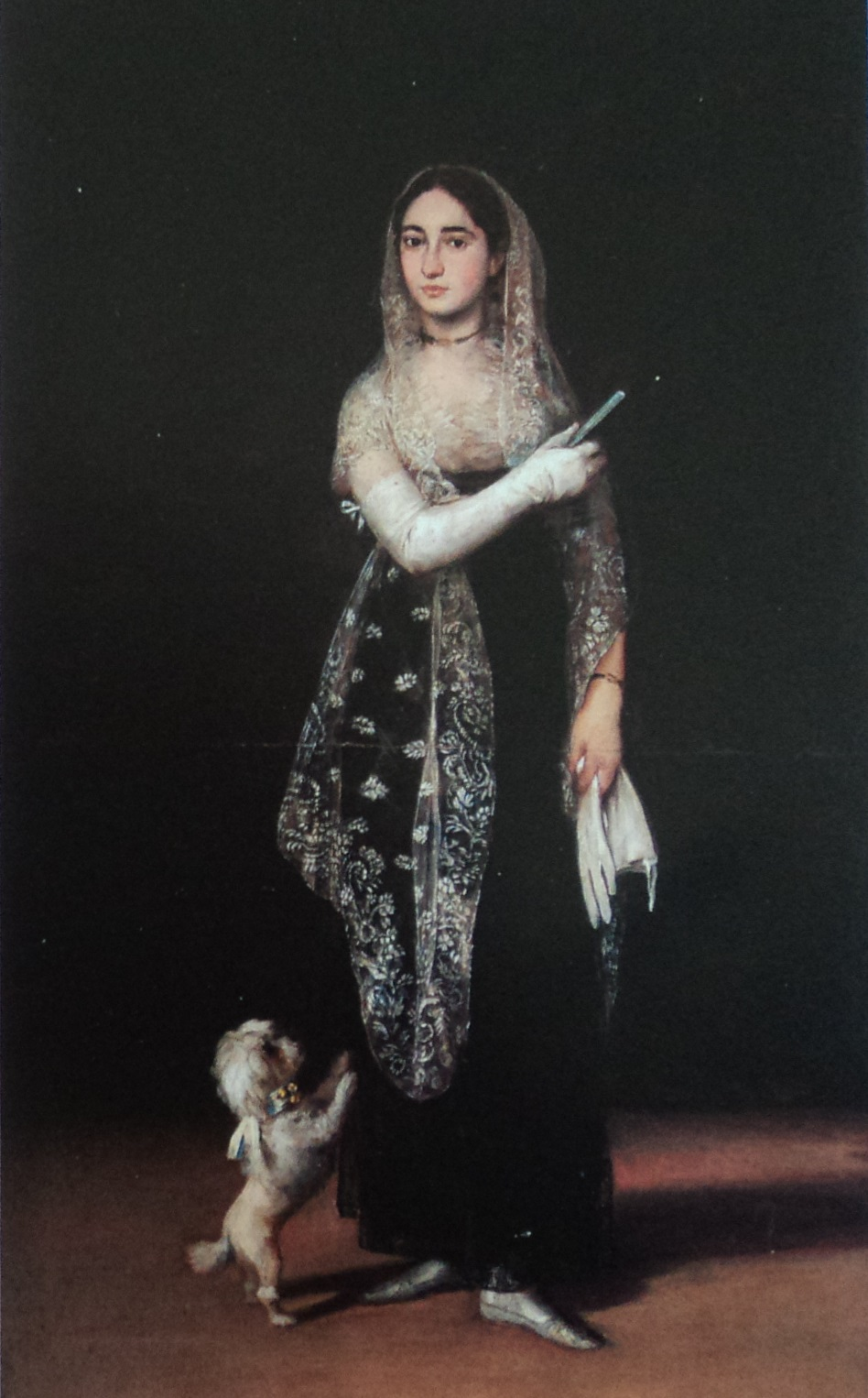
Spain, 1805

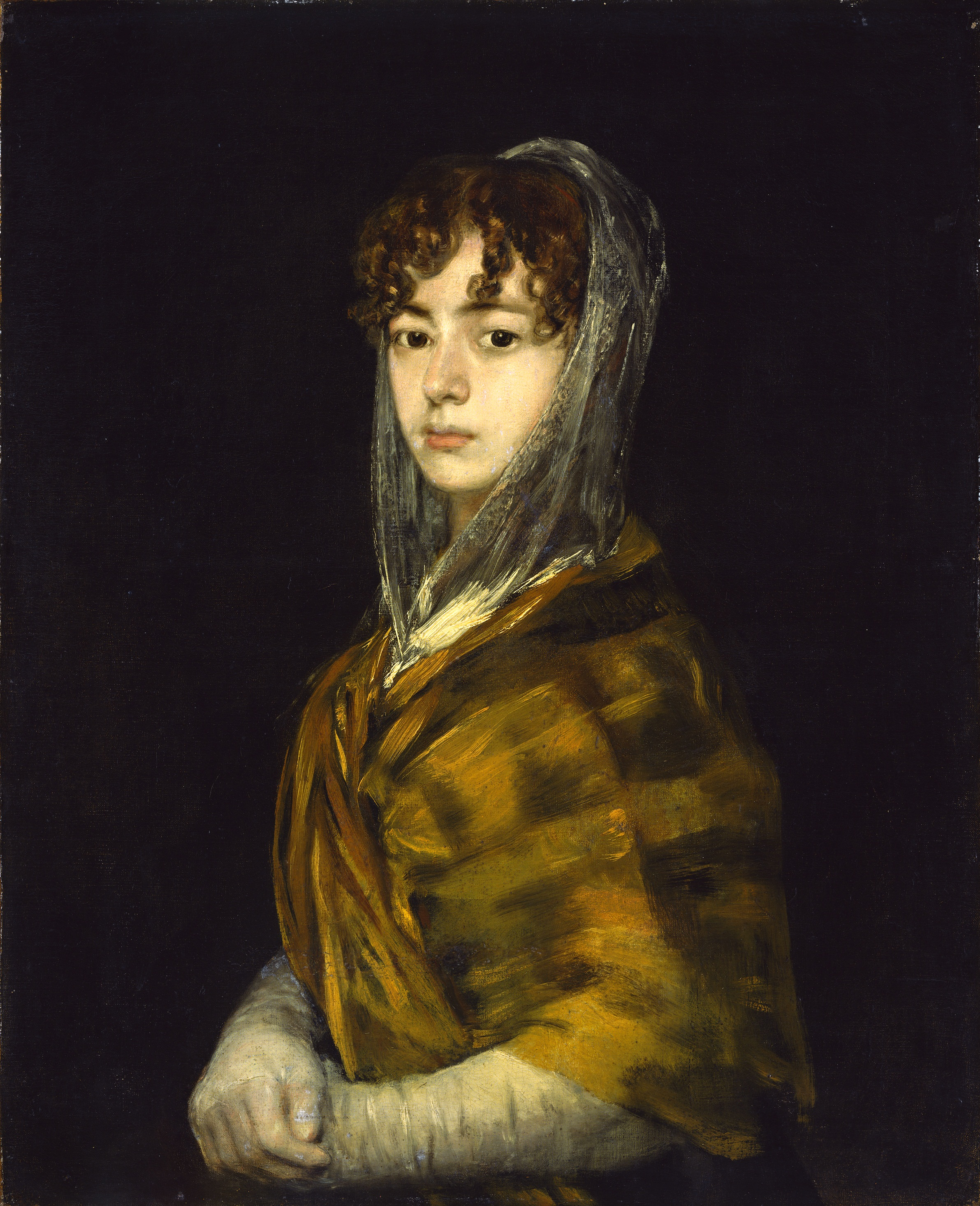
Spain, 1806

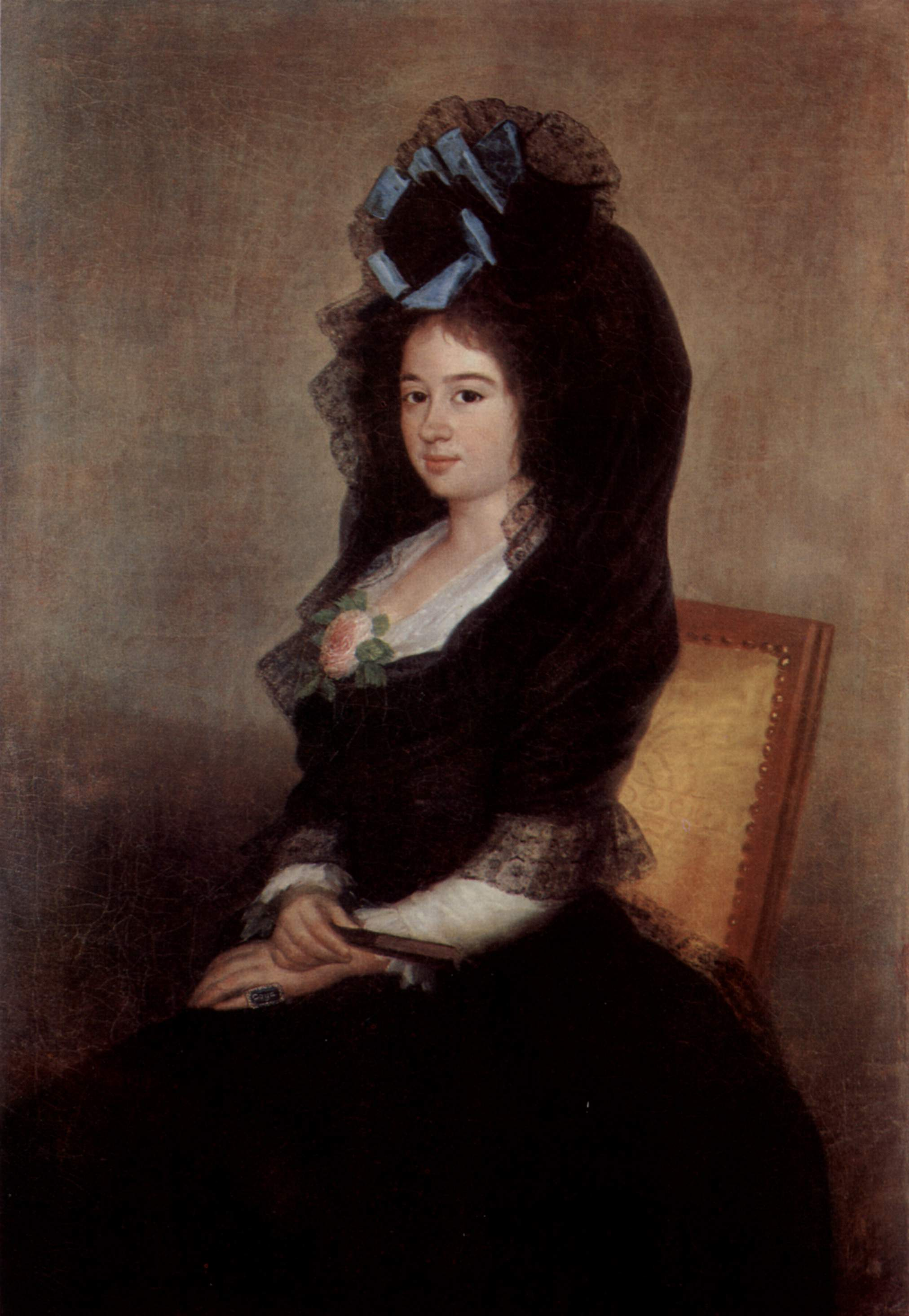
Spain, 1810

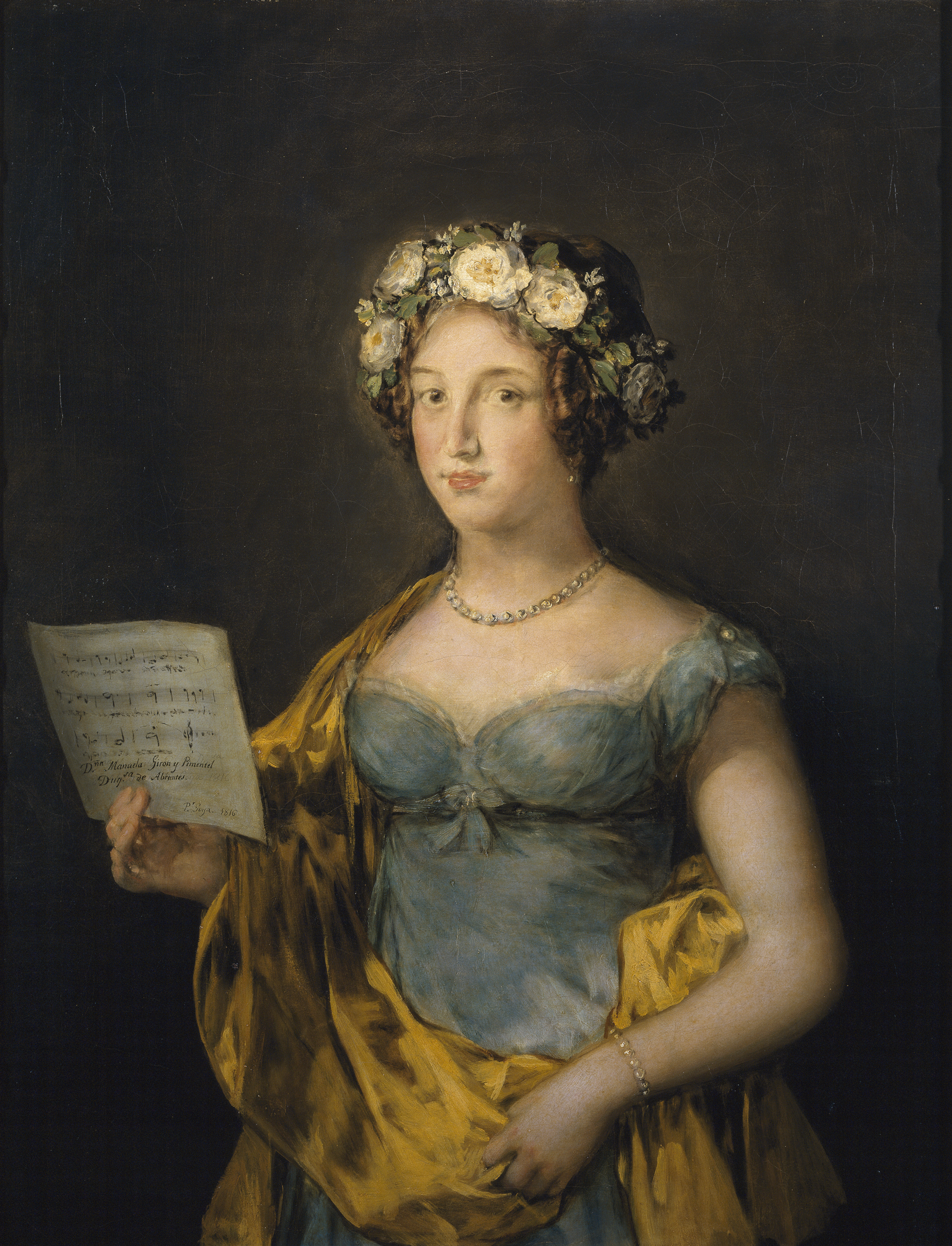
Spain, 1816

=== British fashion ===
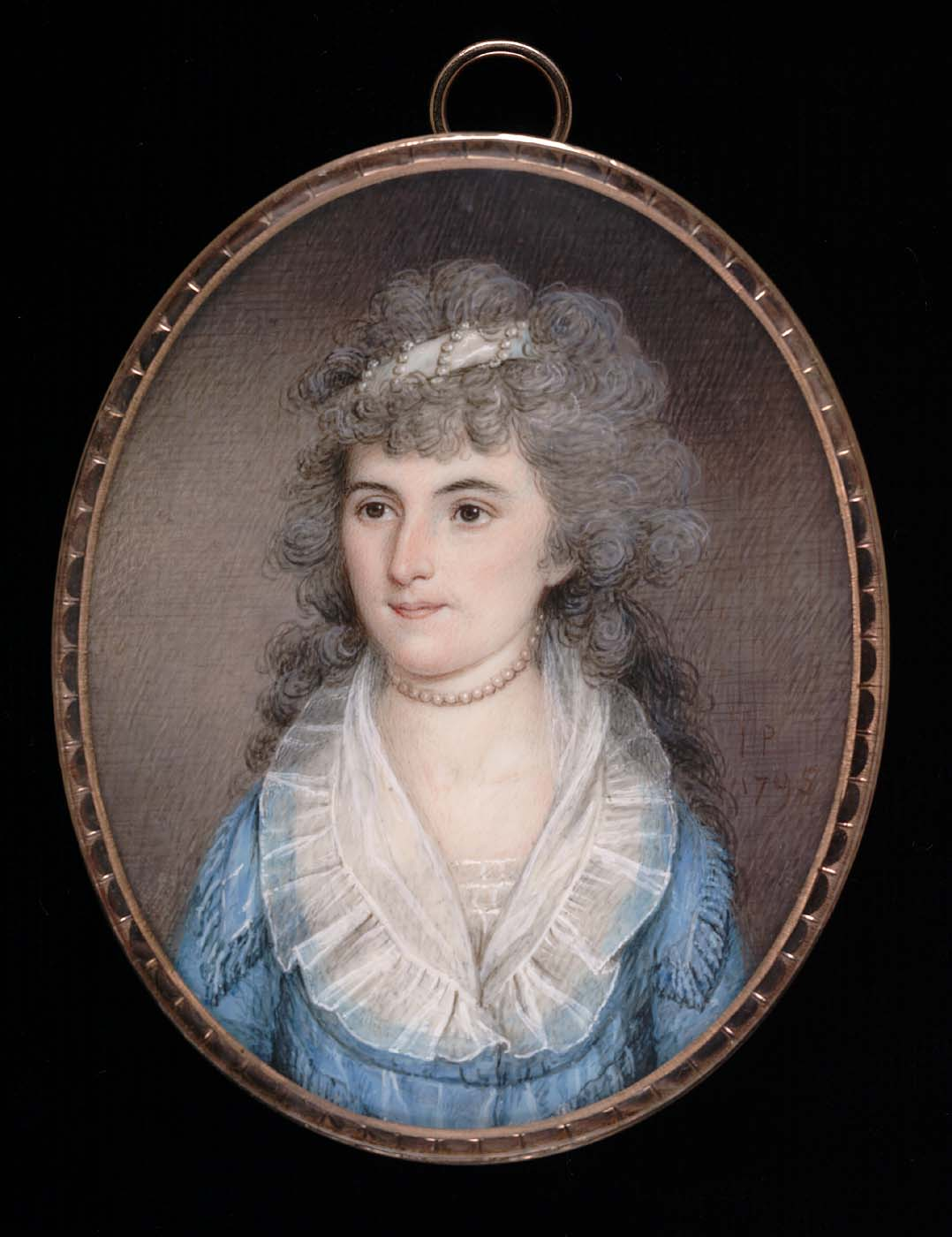
England, 1795

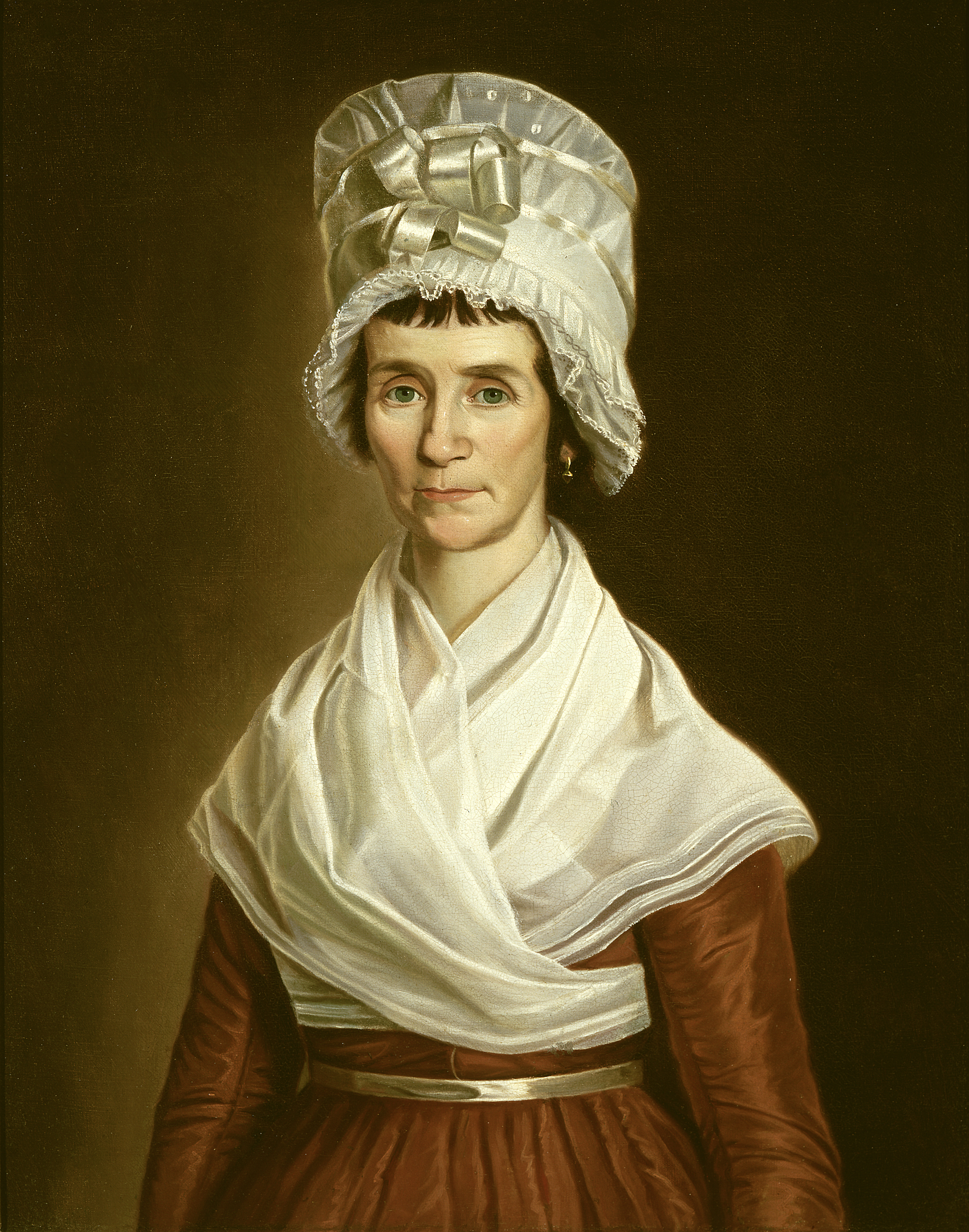
England, 1796

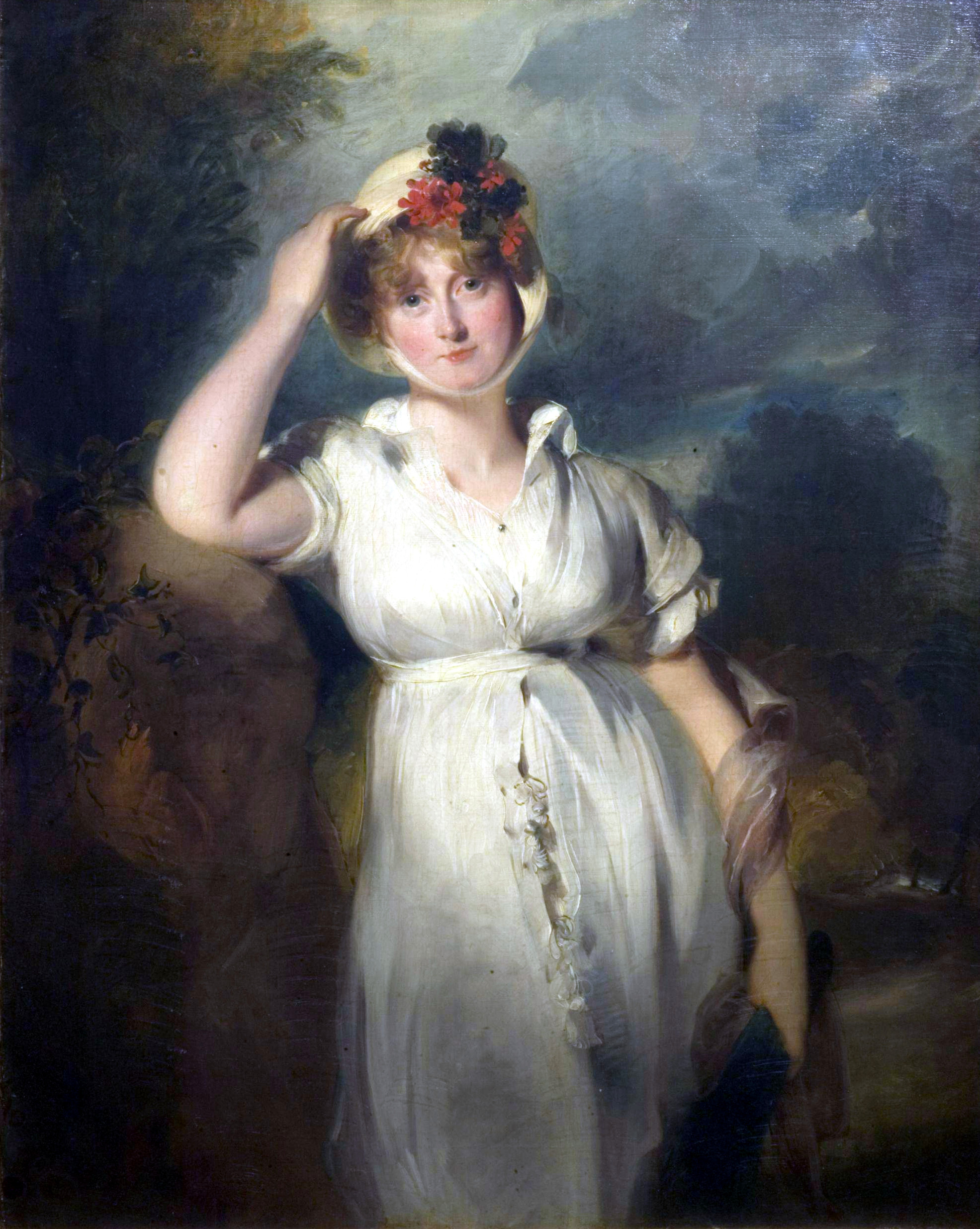
England, 1798

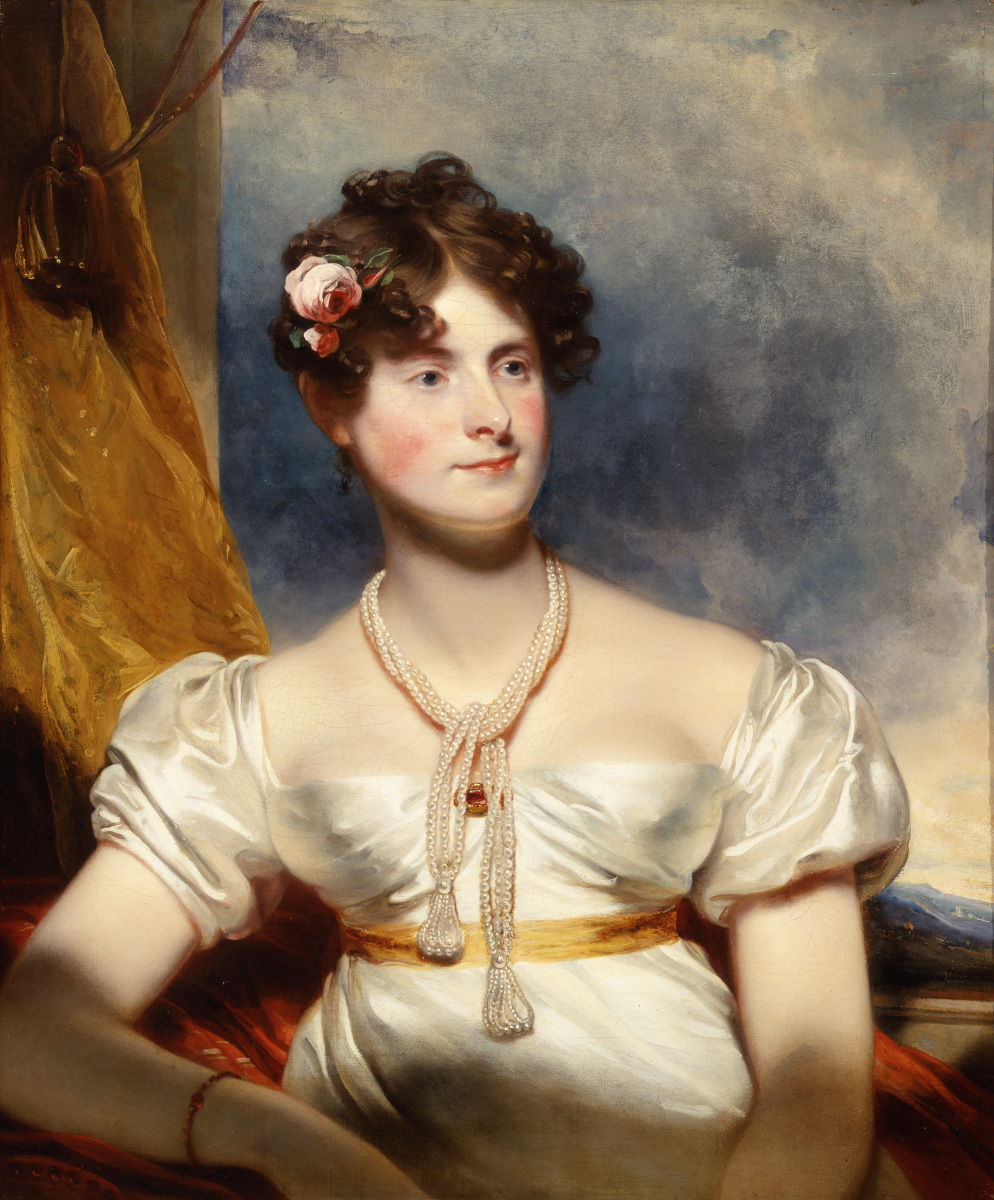
England, 1800

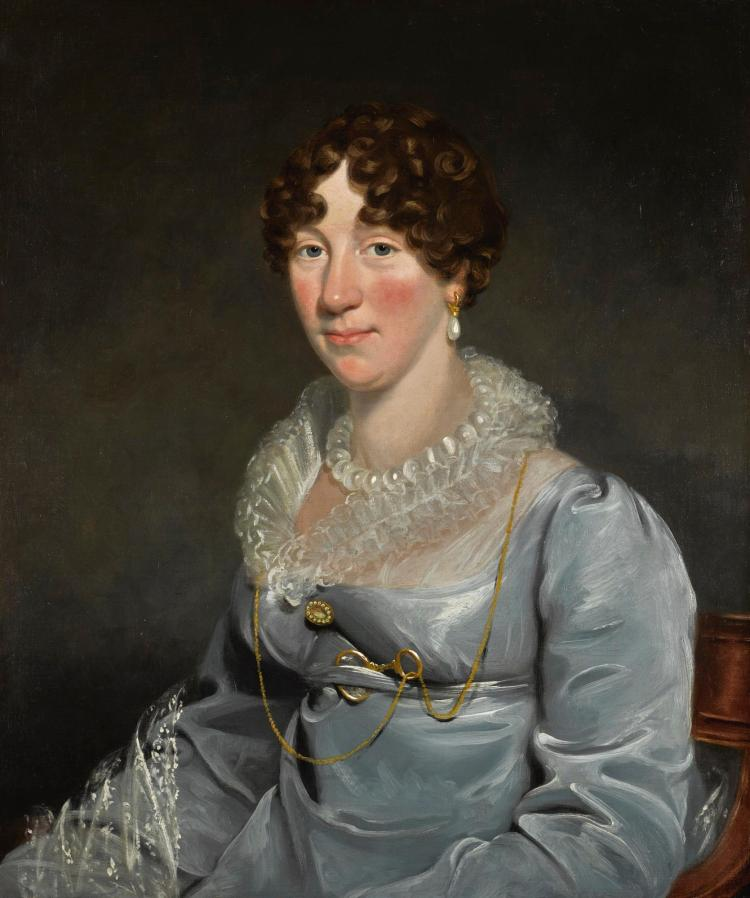
England, 1802

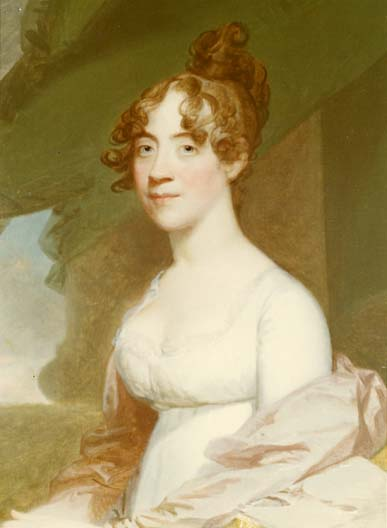
England, 1804

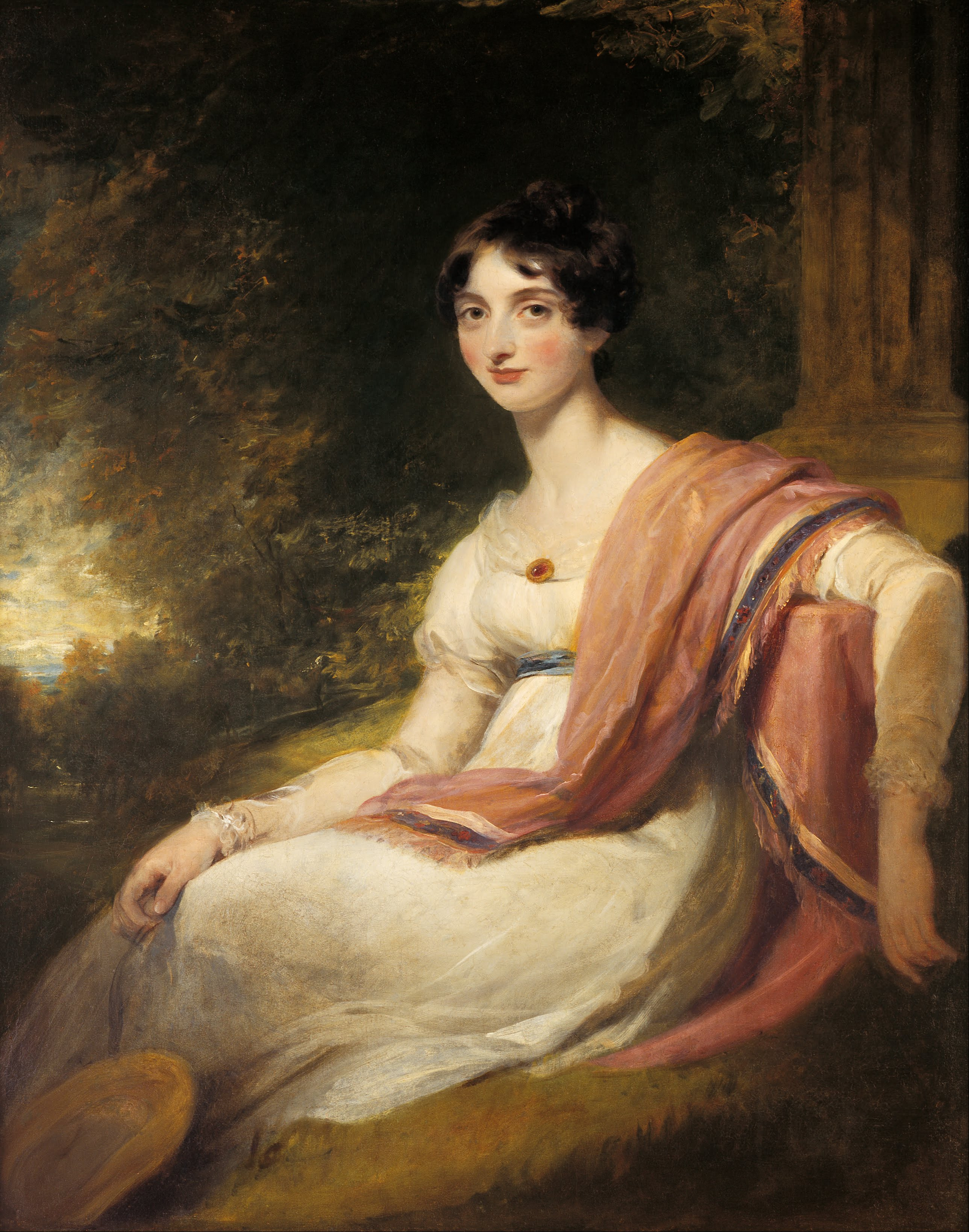
England, 1808

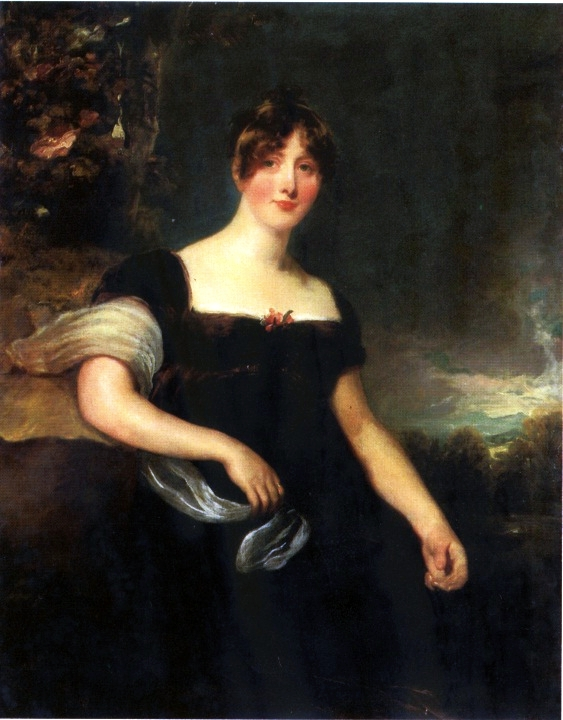
England, 1810

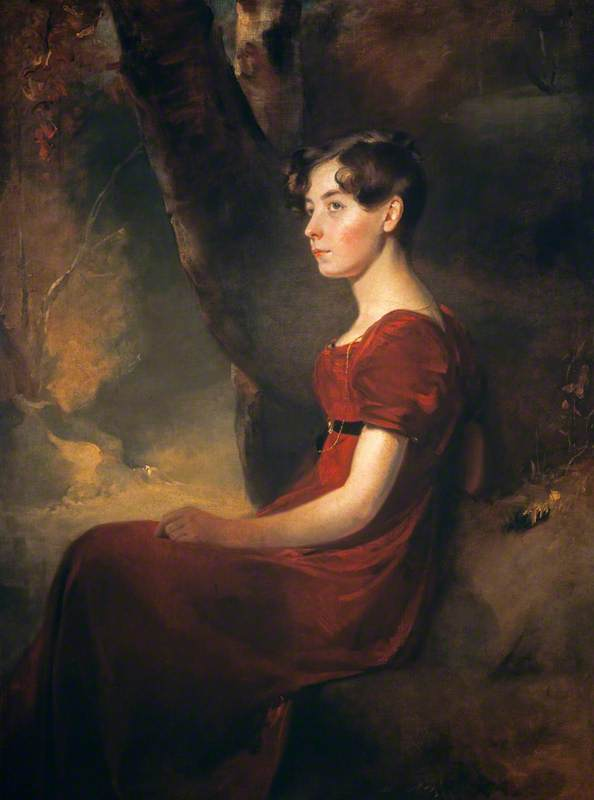
England, 1812

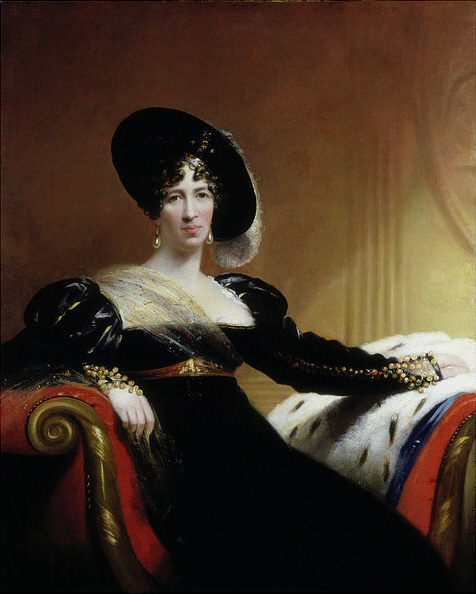
England, 1815

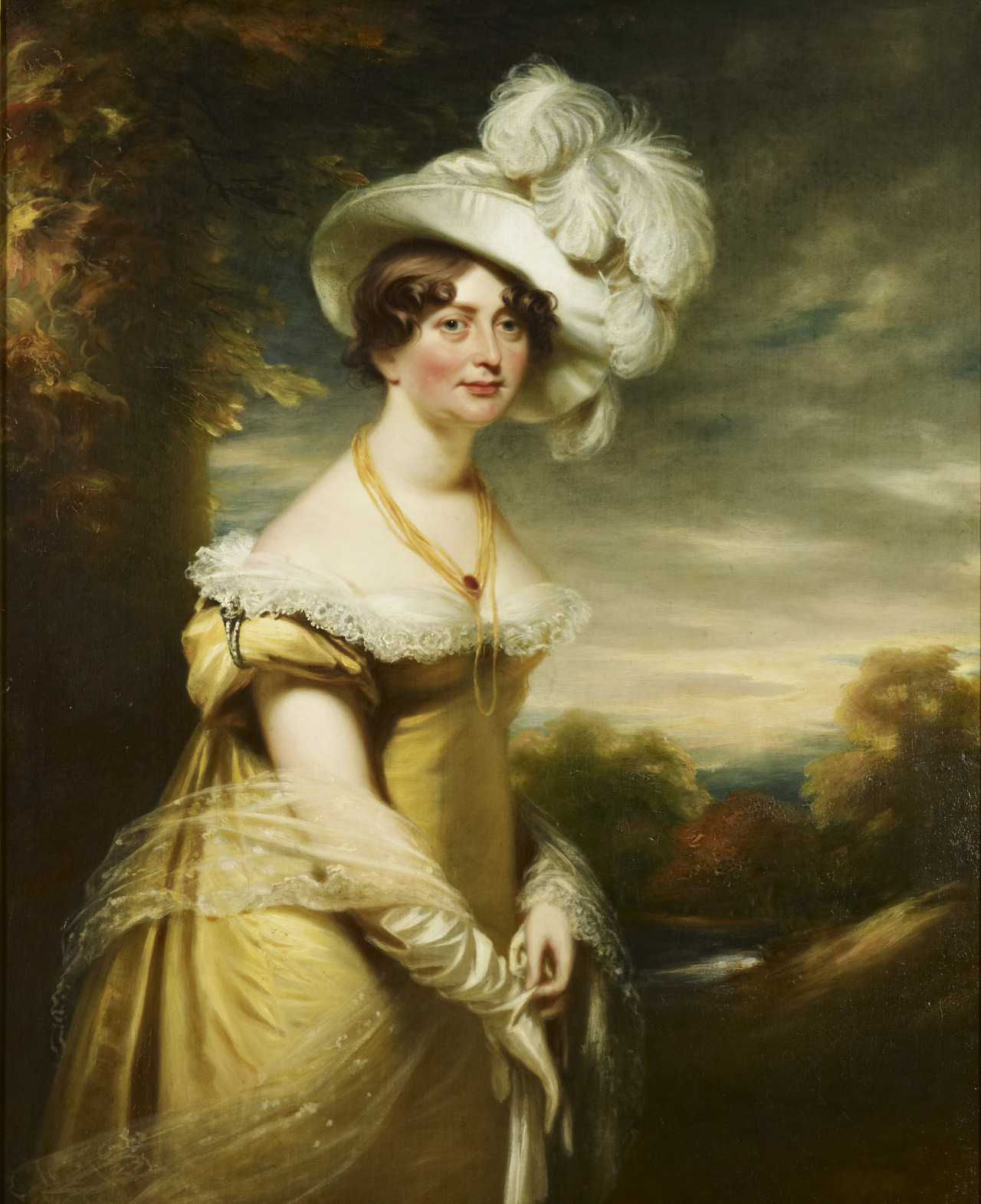
England, 1819

=== German fashion ===
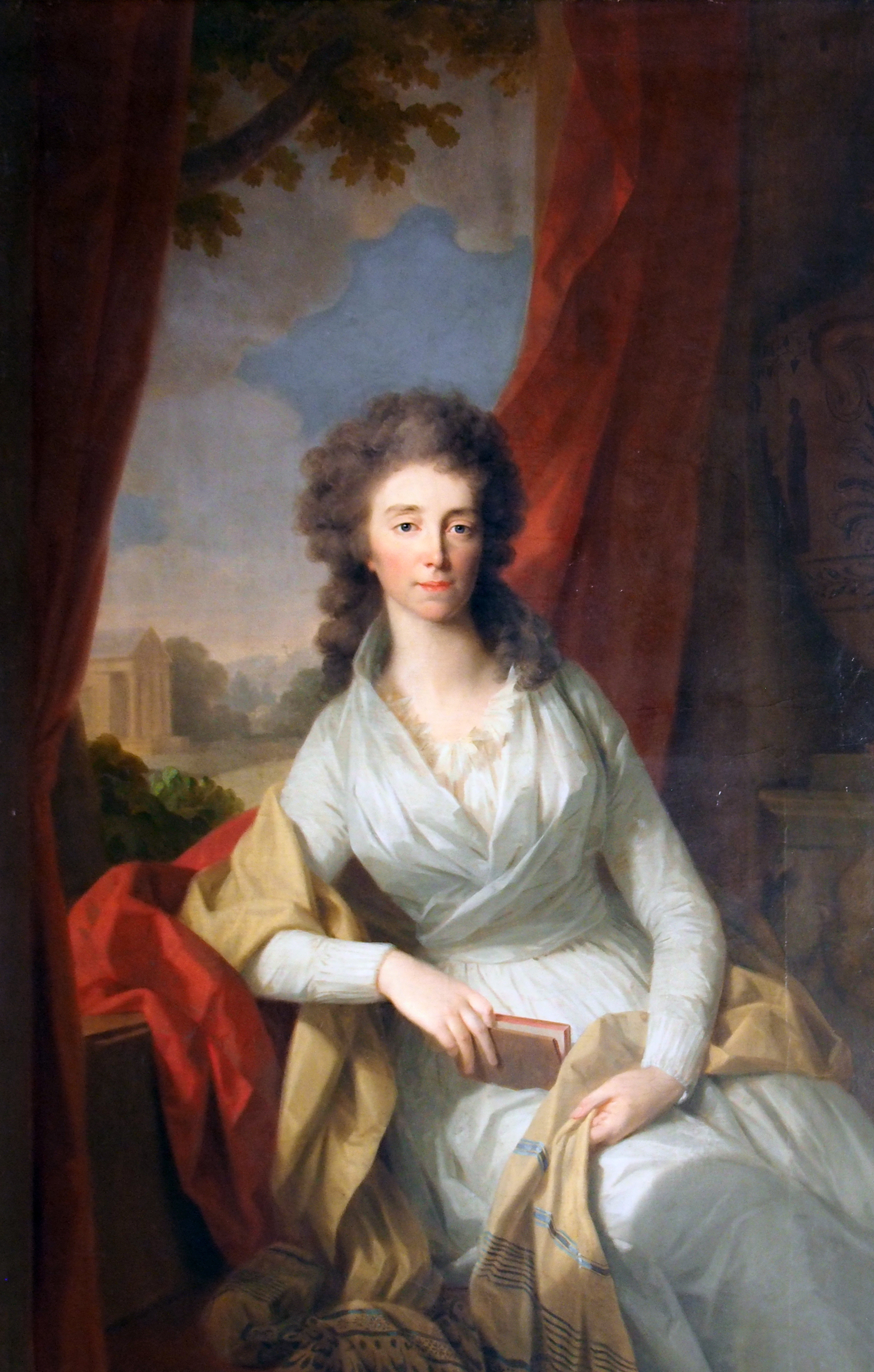
German, 1795

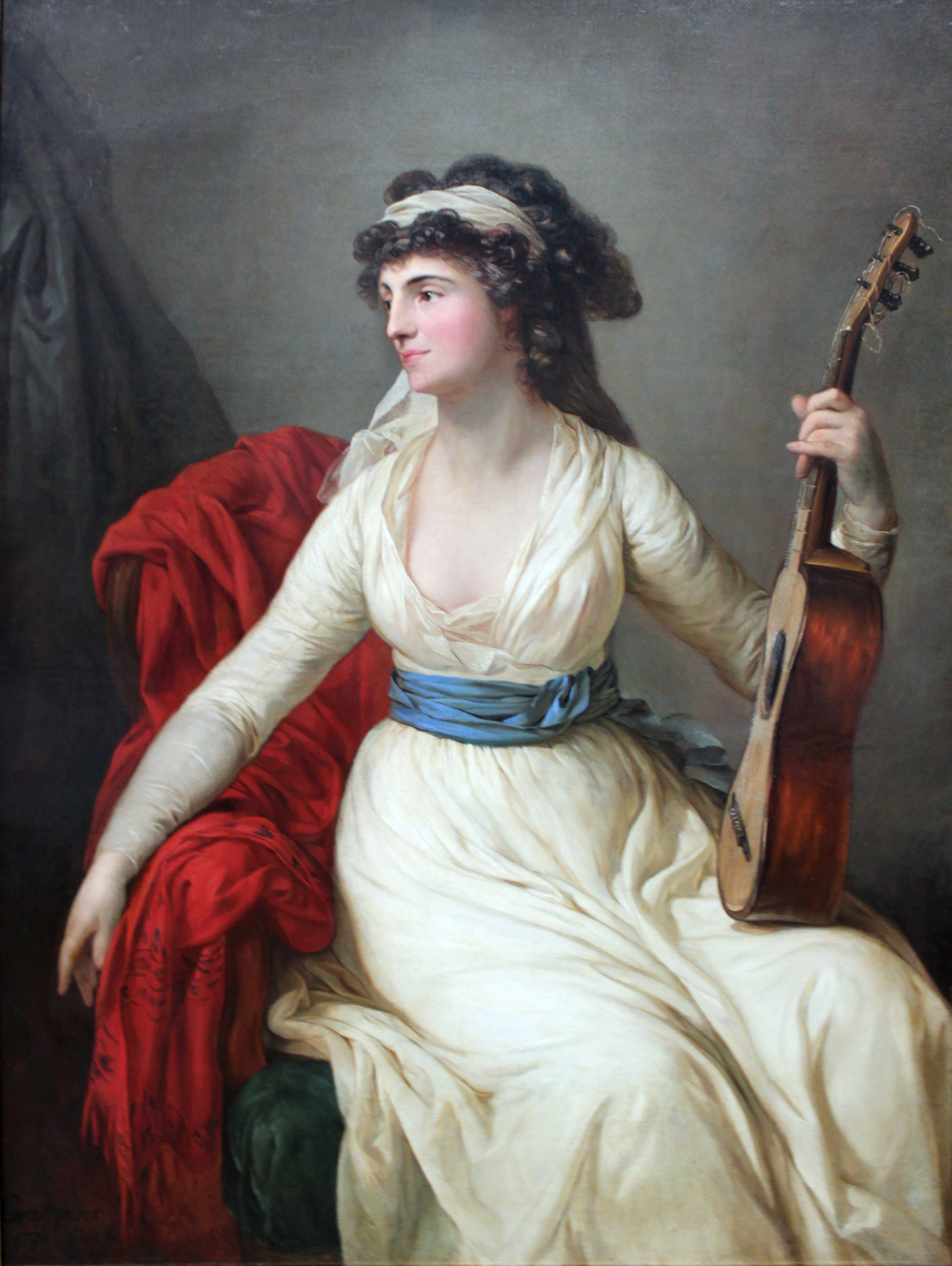
German, 1796

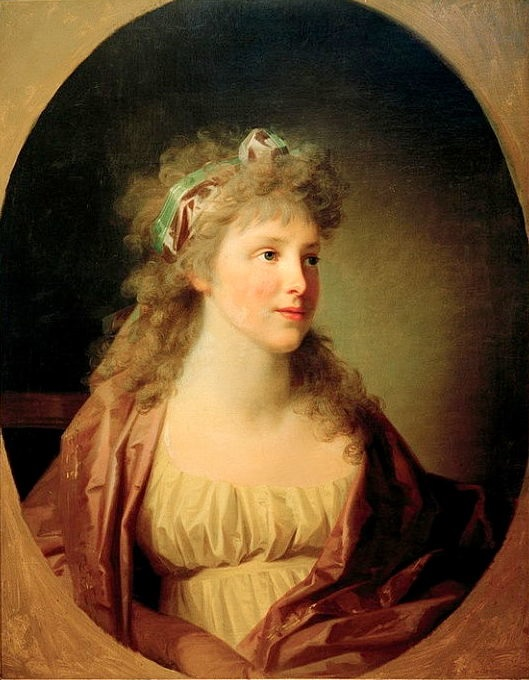
German, 1798

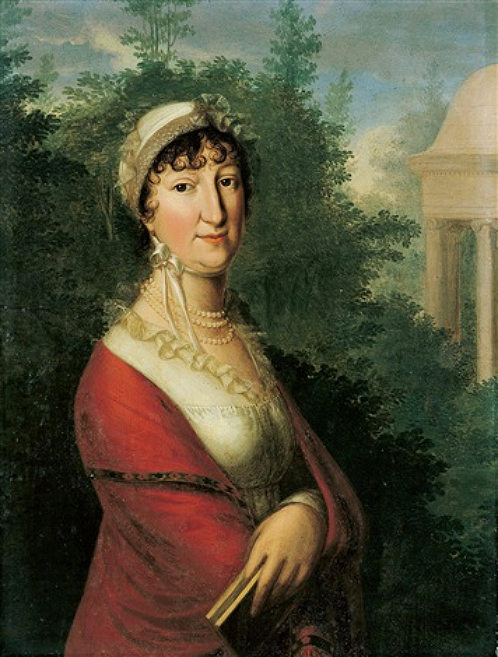
German, 1800

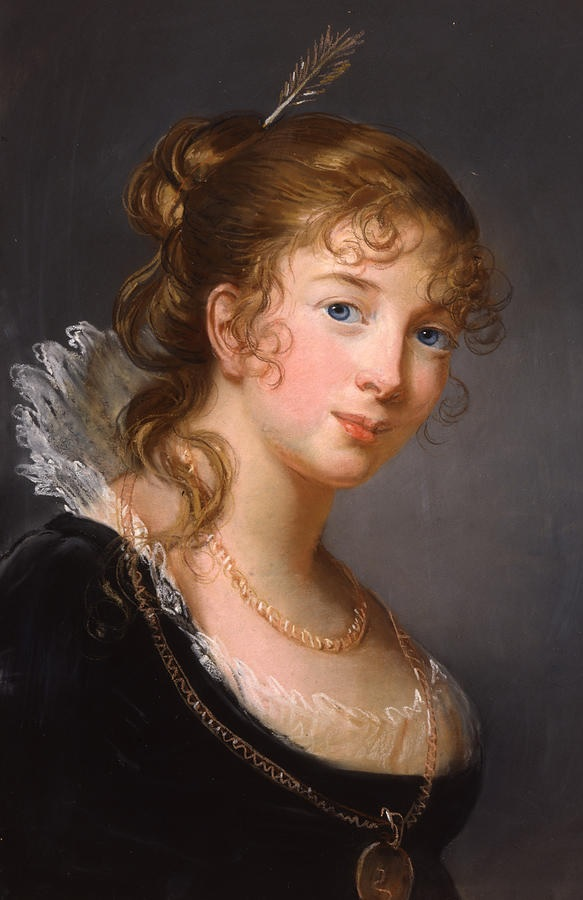
German, 1802

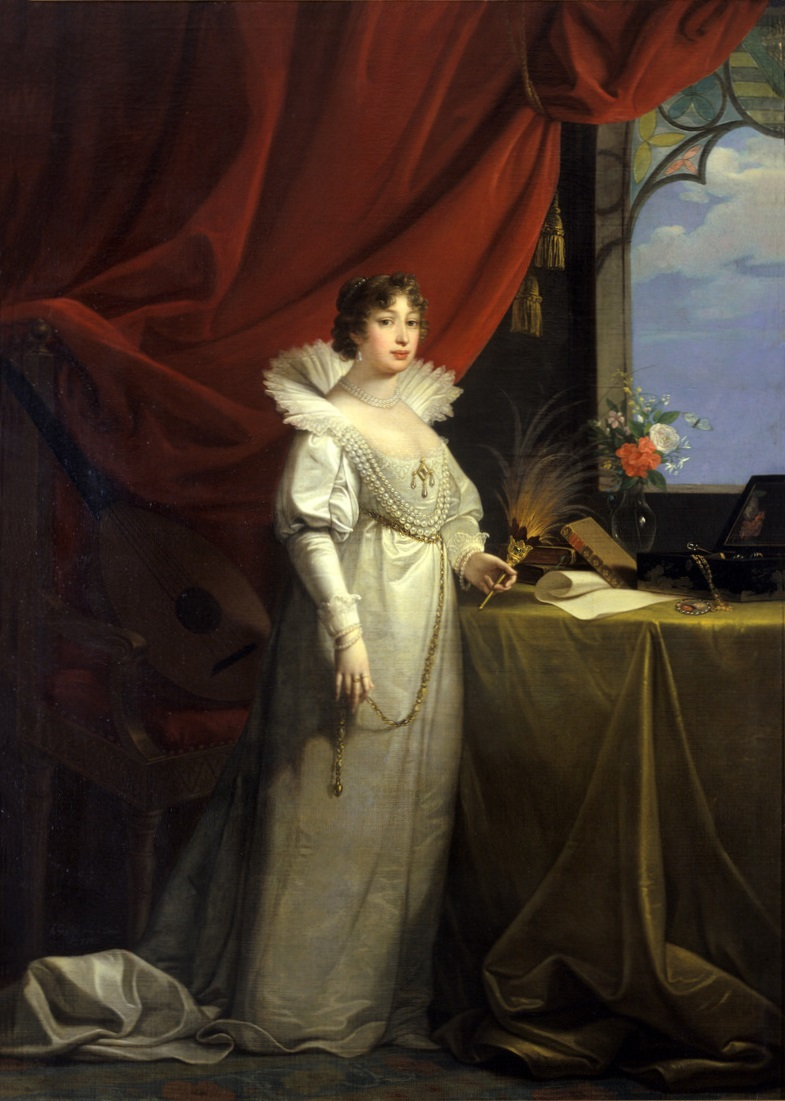
German, 1804

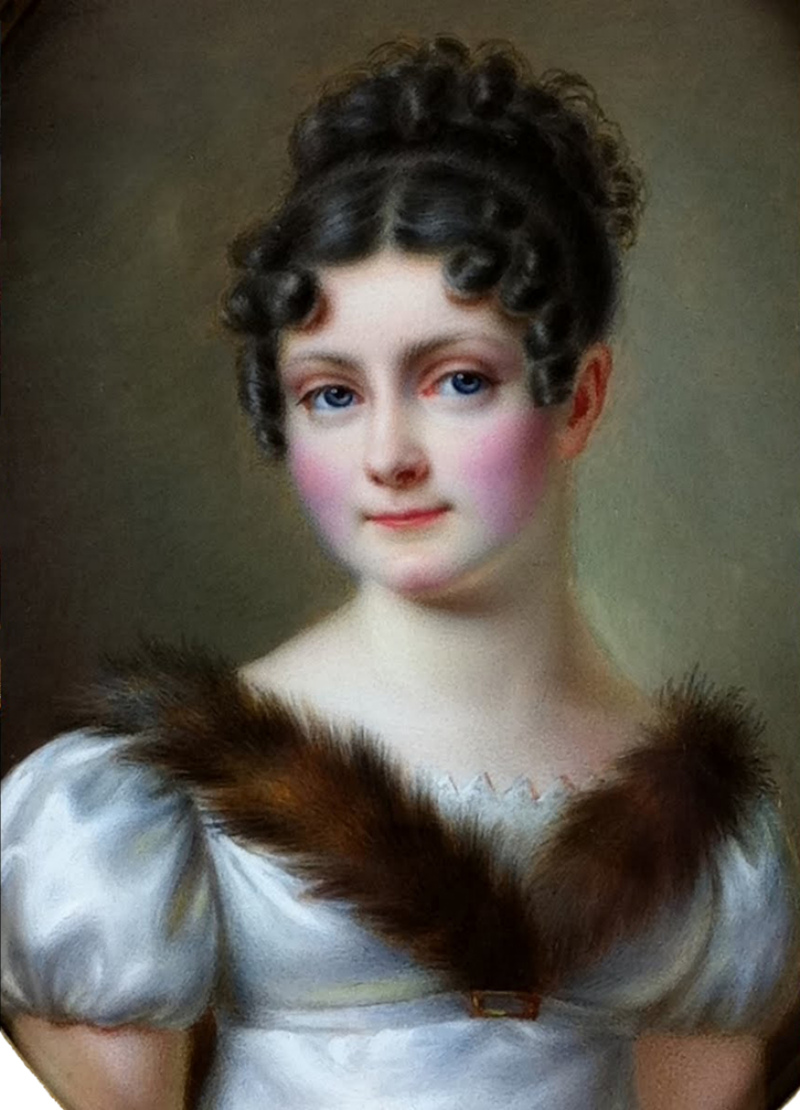
German, 1808

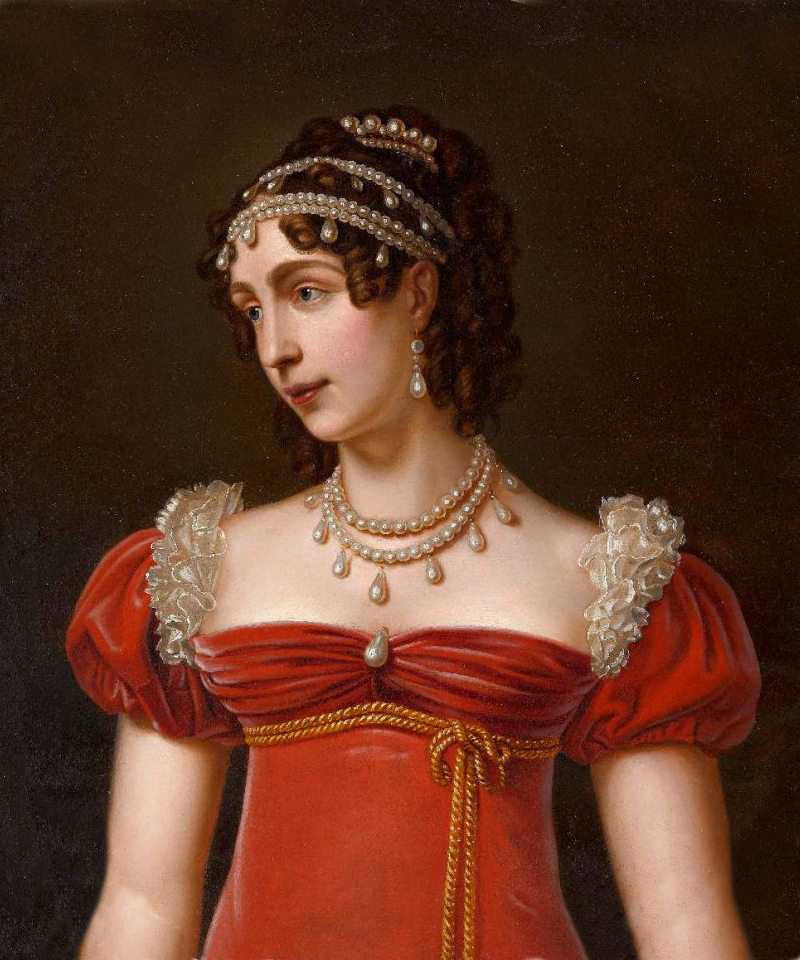
German, 1810

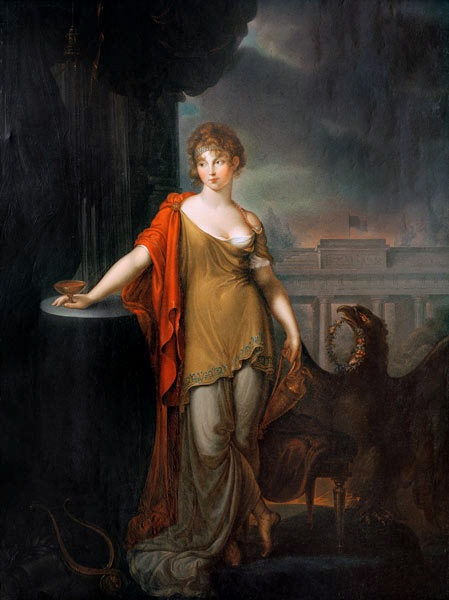
German, 1812

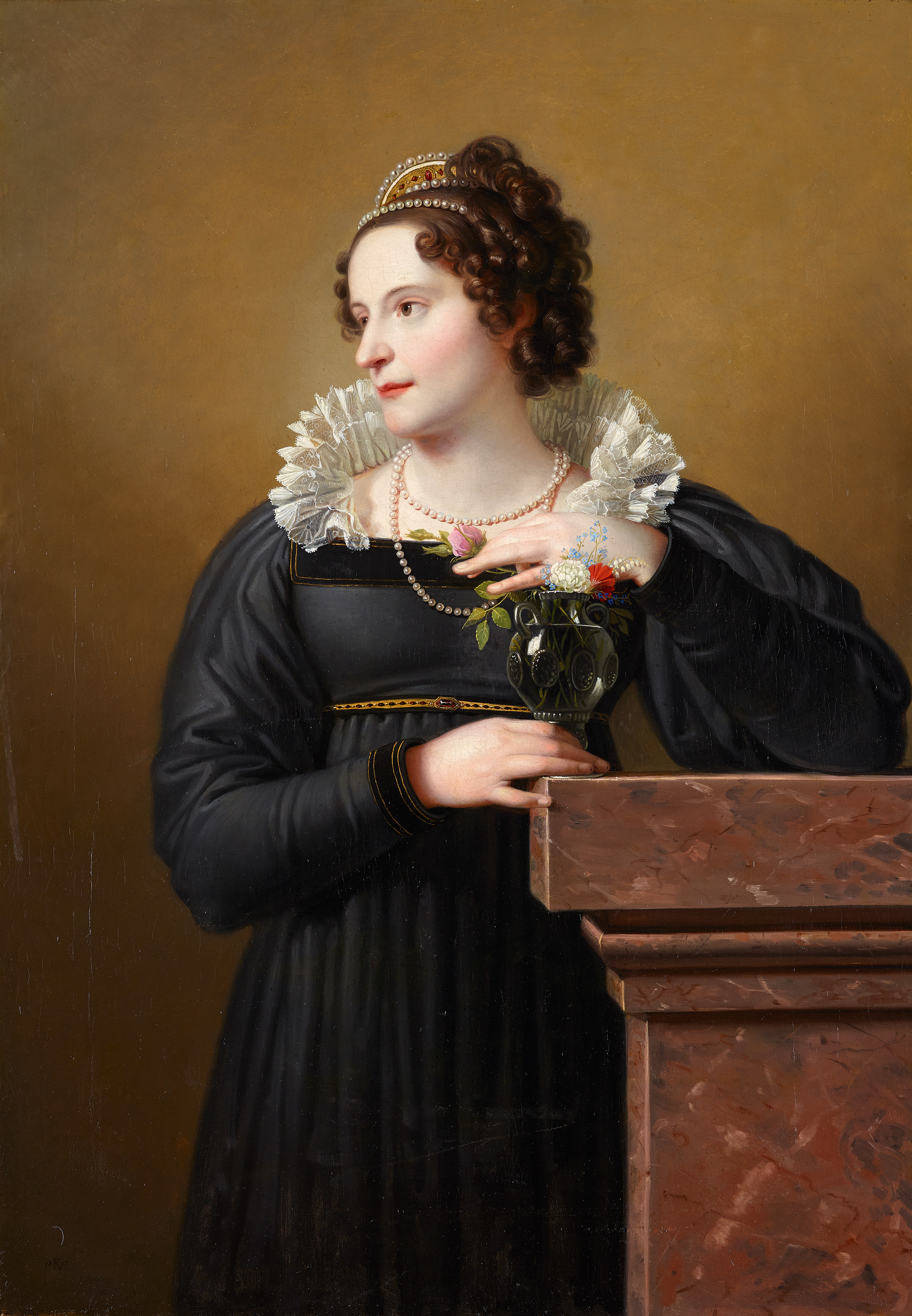
German, 1815

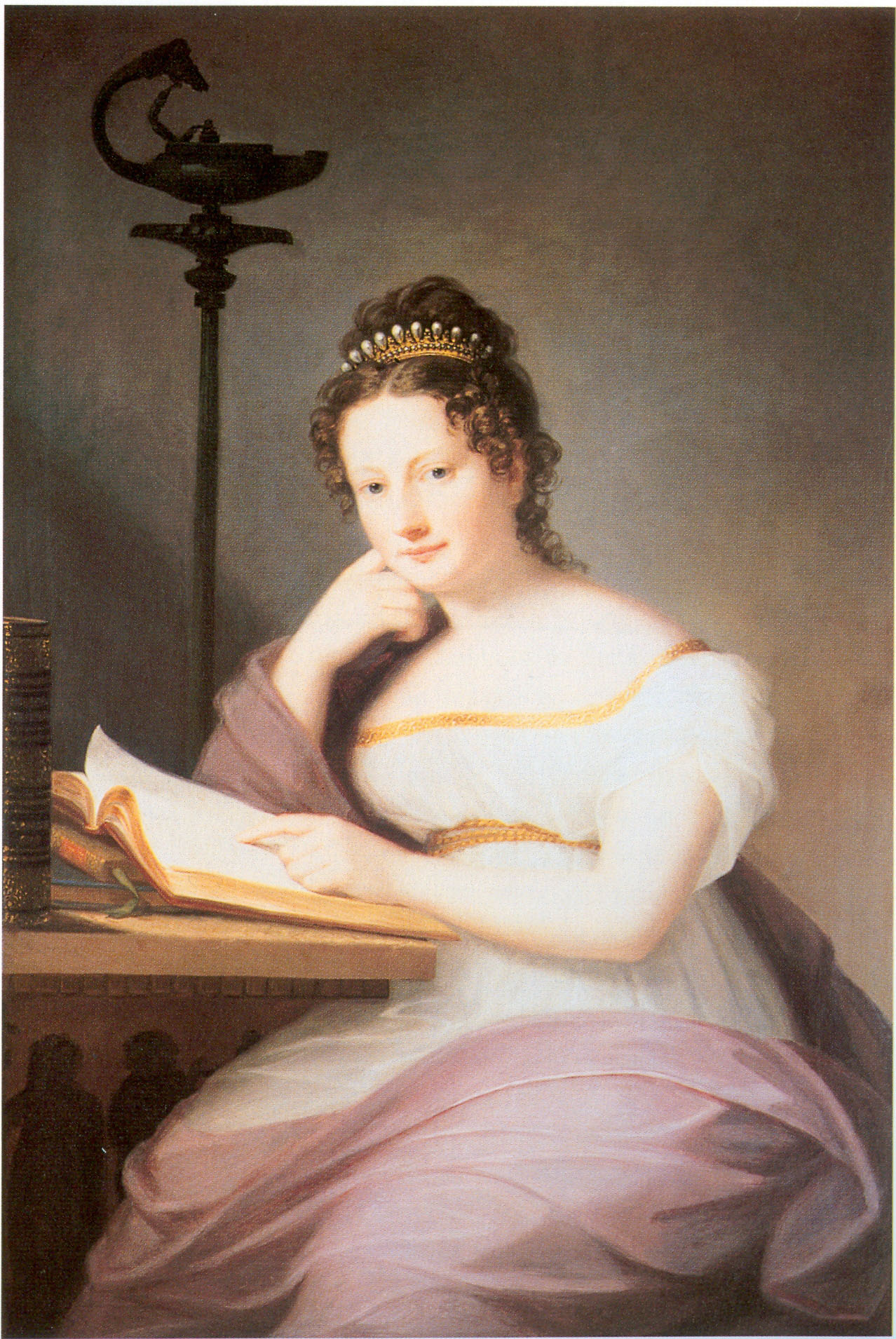
German, 1819

=== French fashion ===
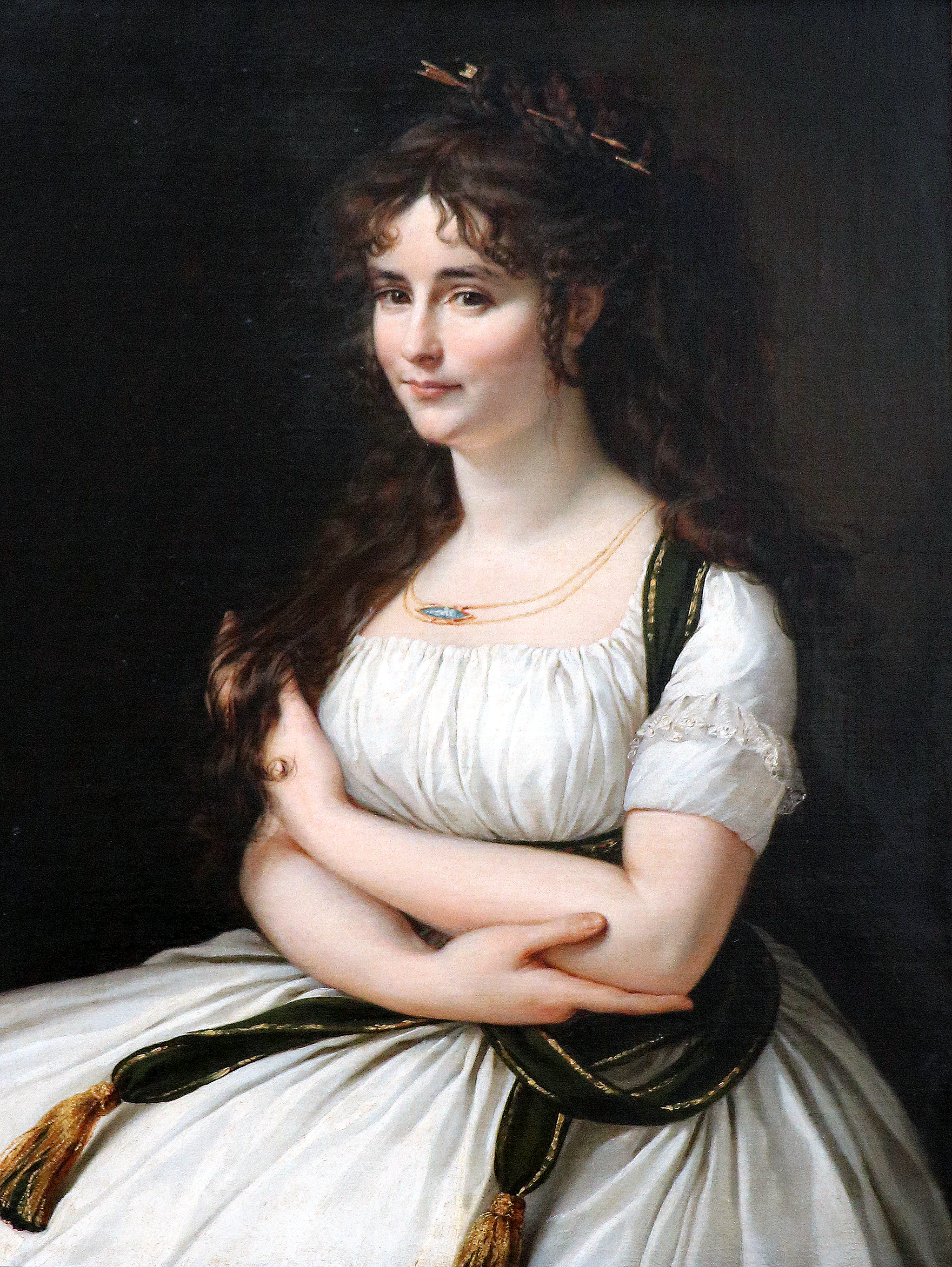
France, 1795

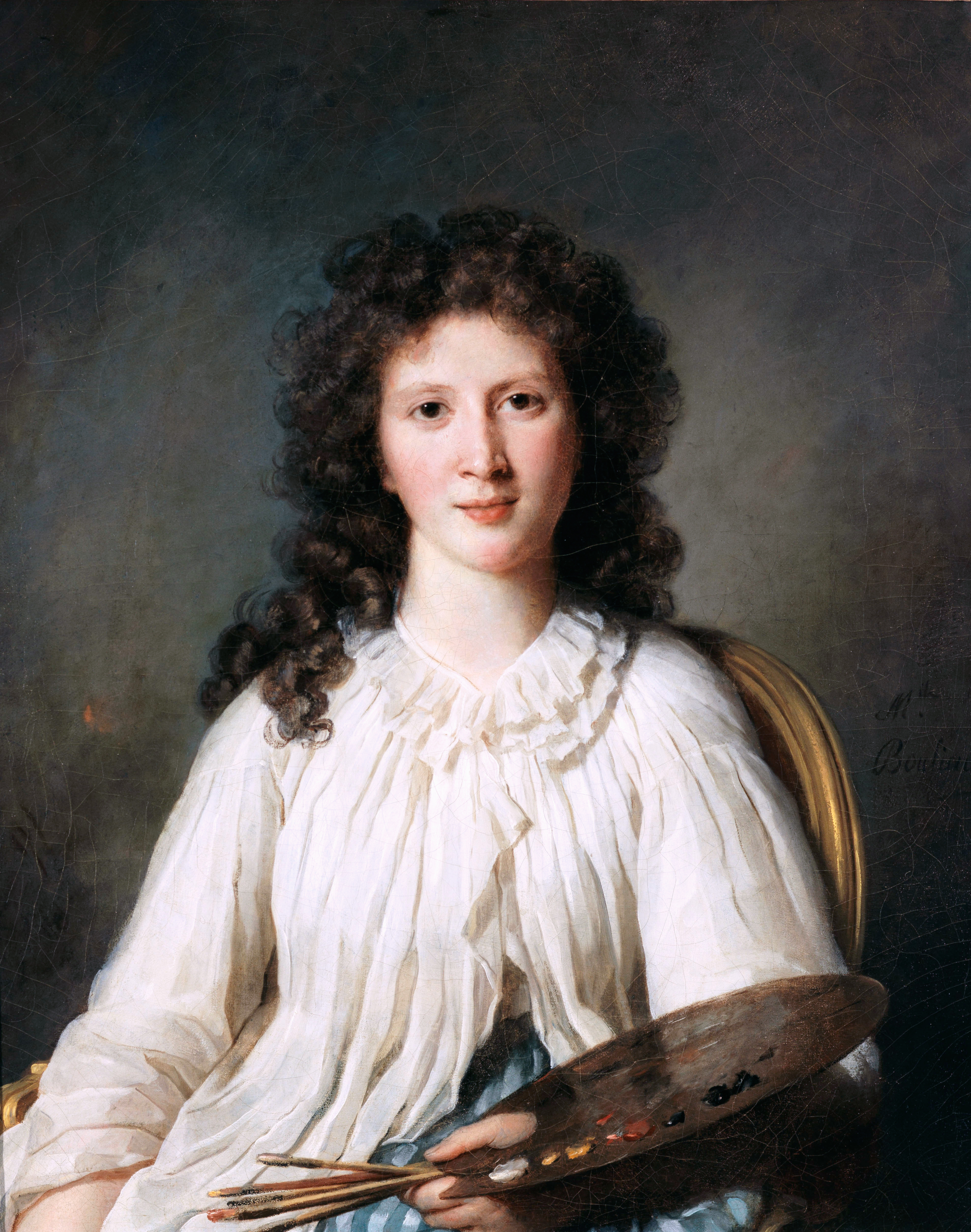
France, 1796

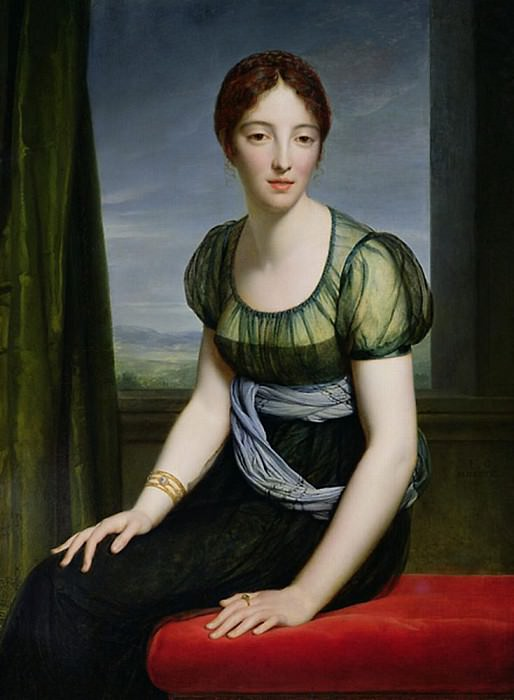
France, 1798

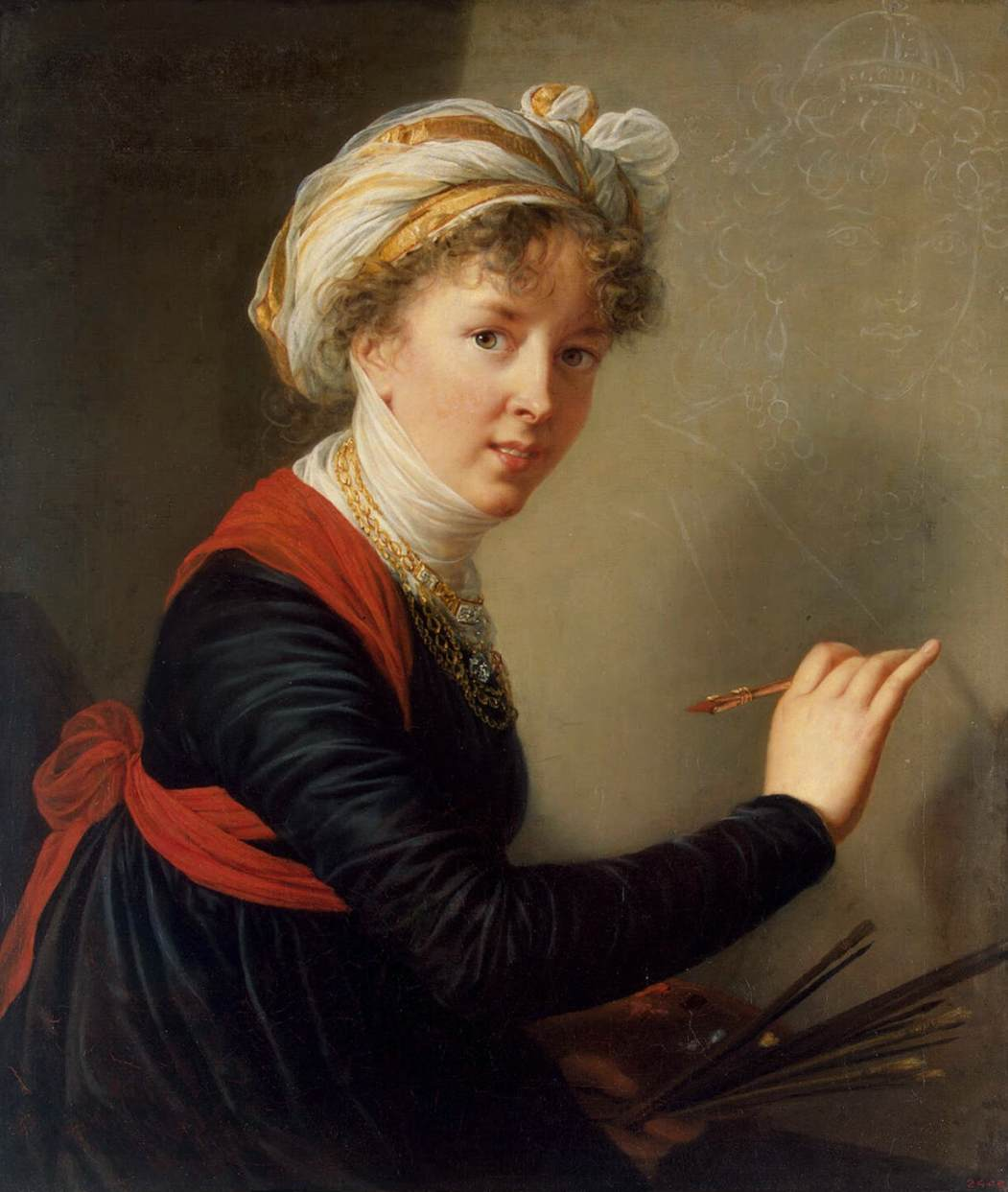
France, 1800

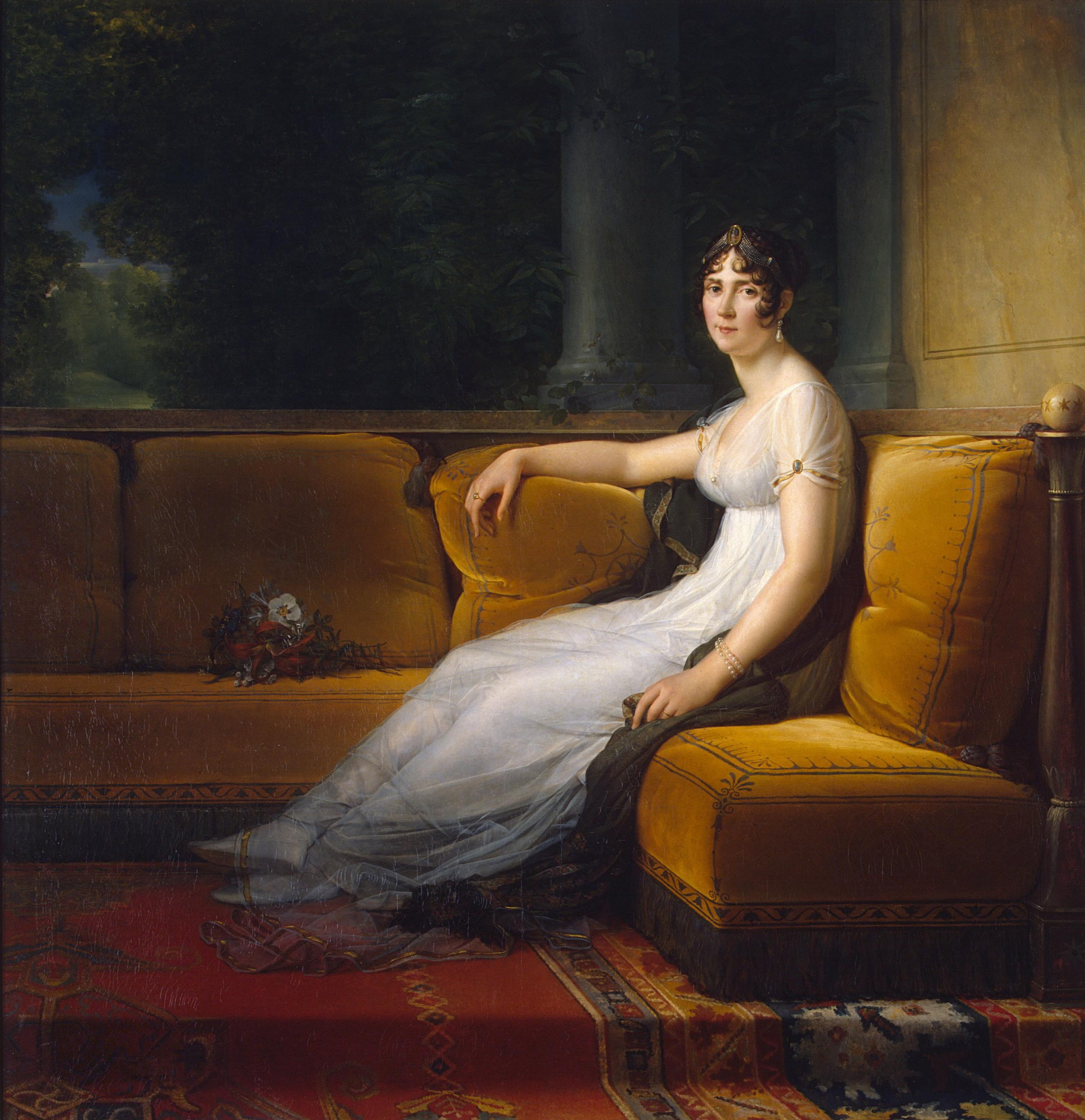
France, 1801

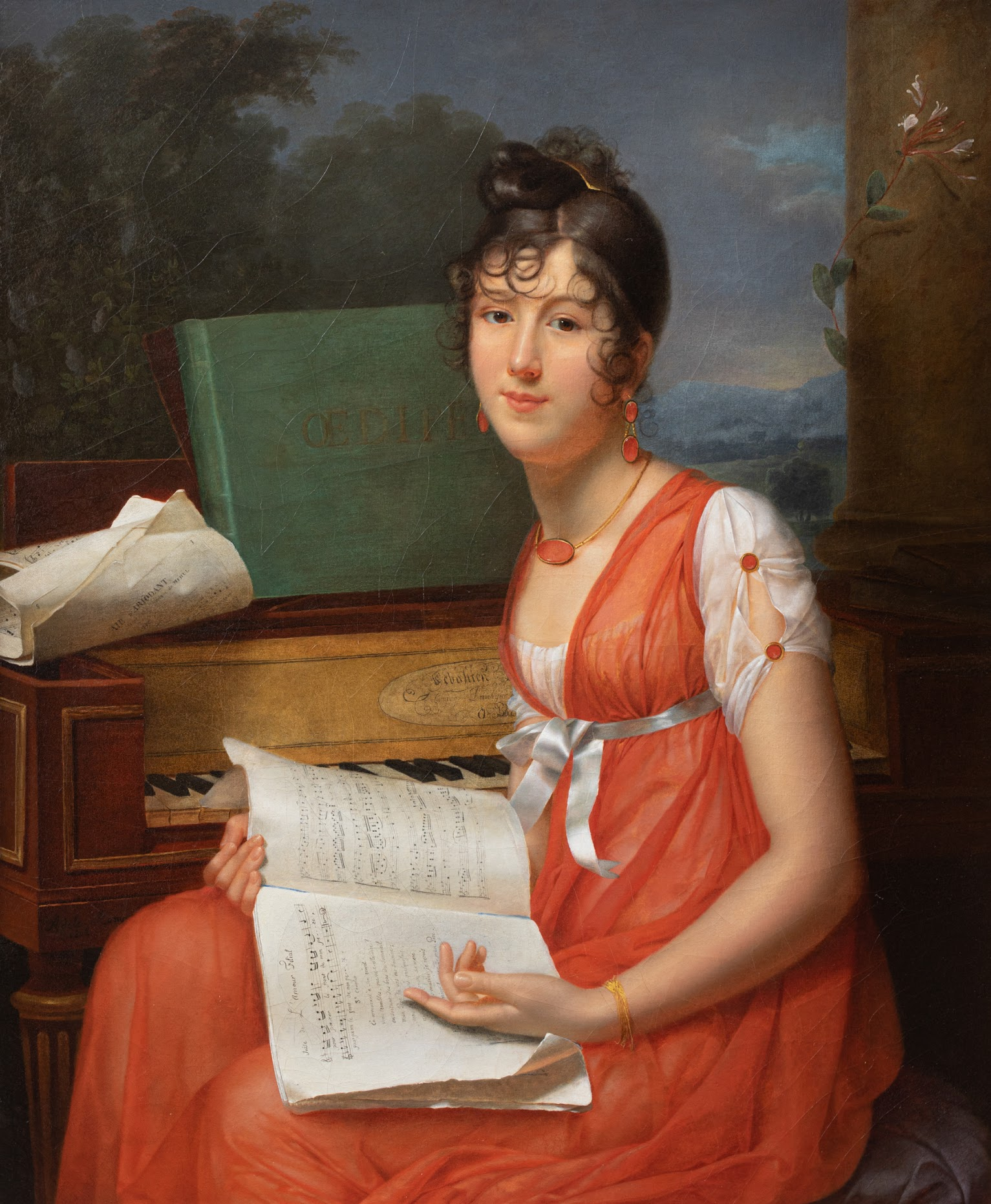
France, 1802

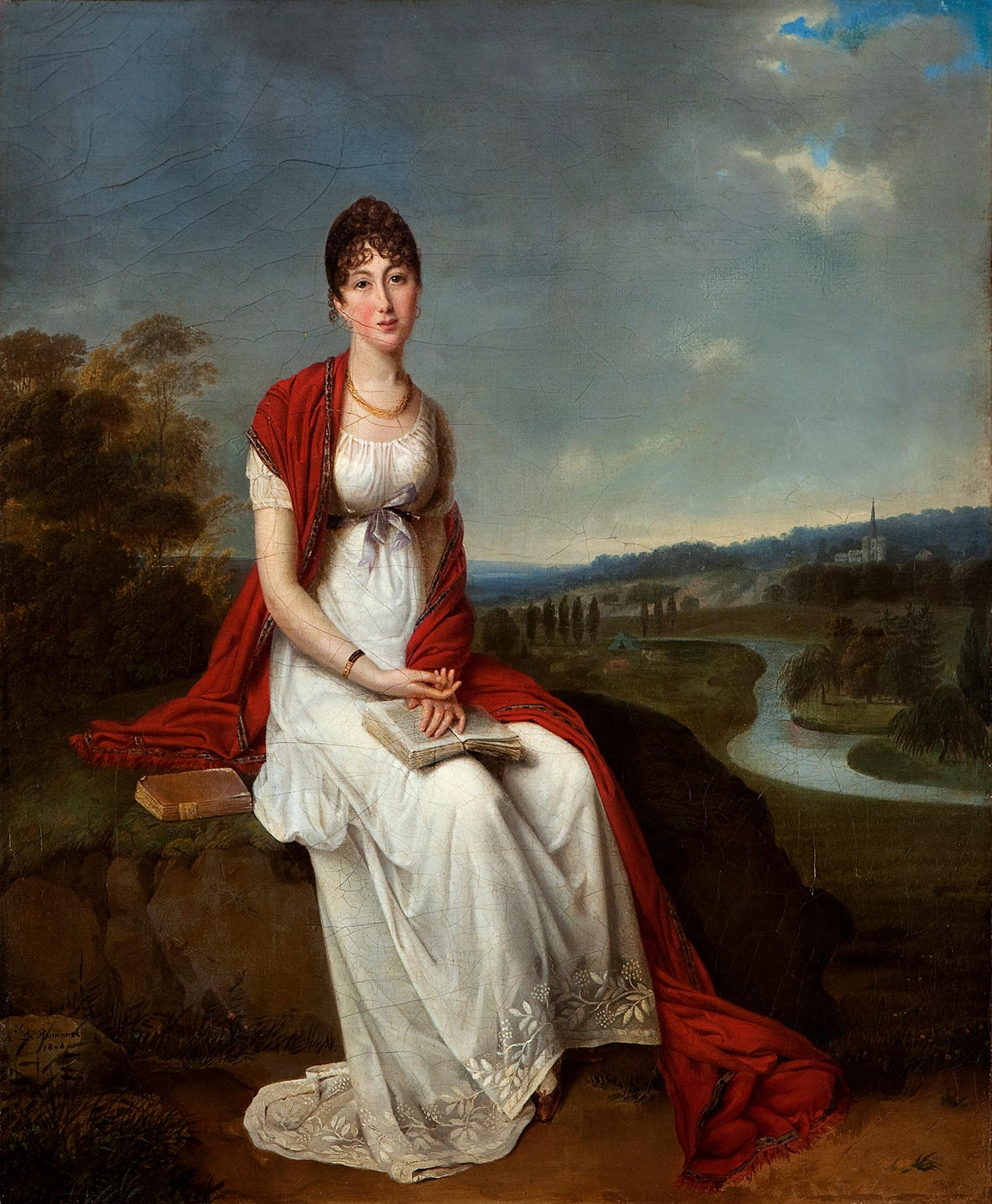
France, 1804

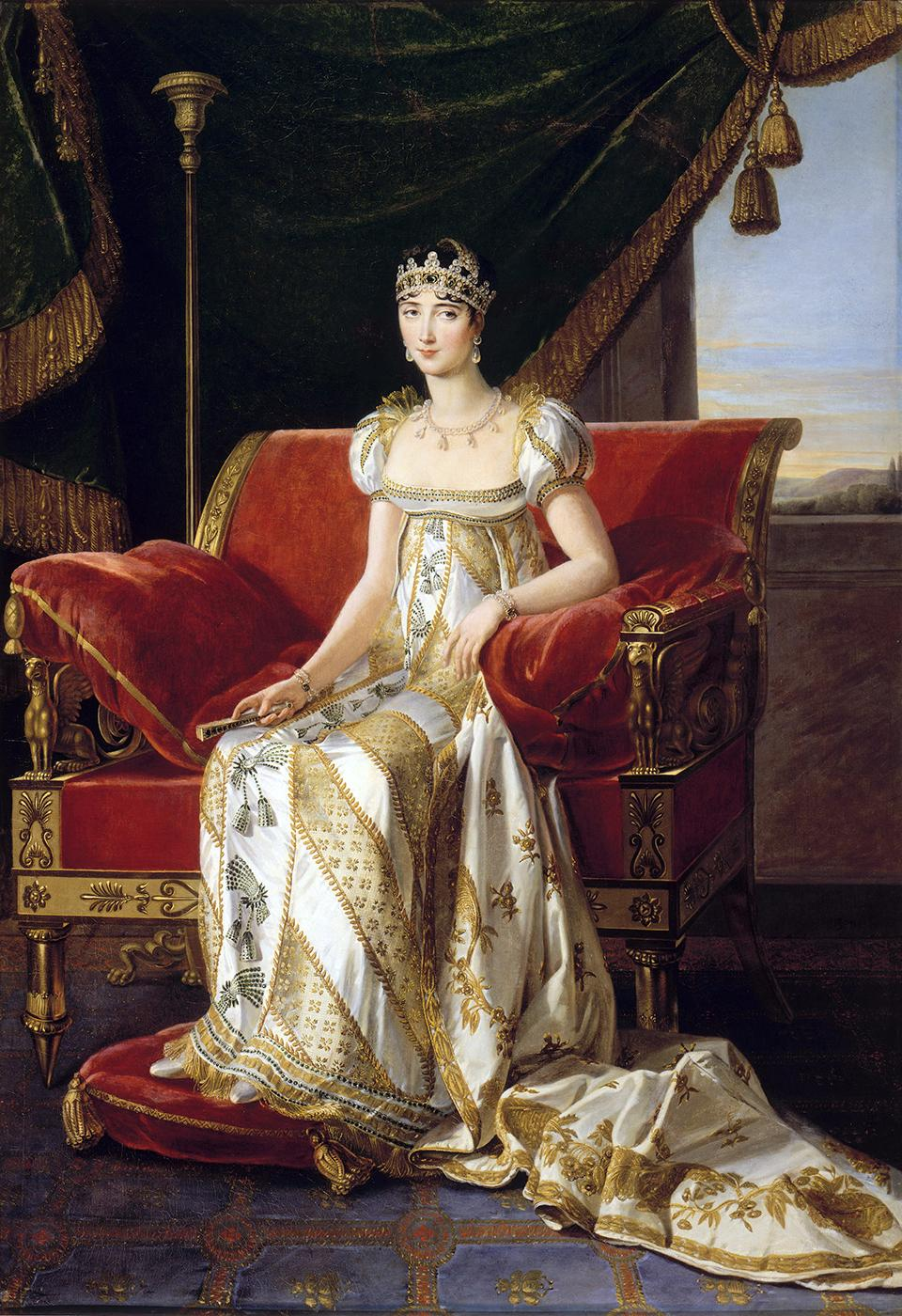
France, 1808

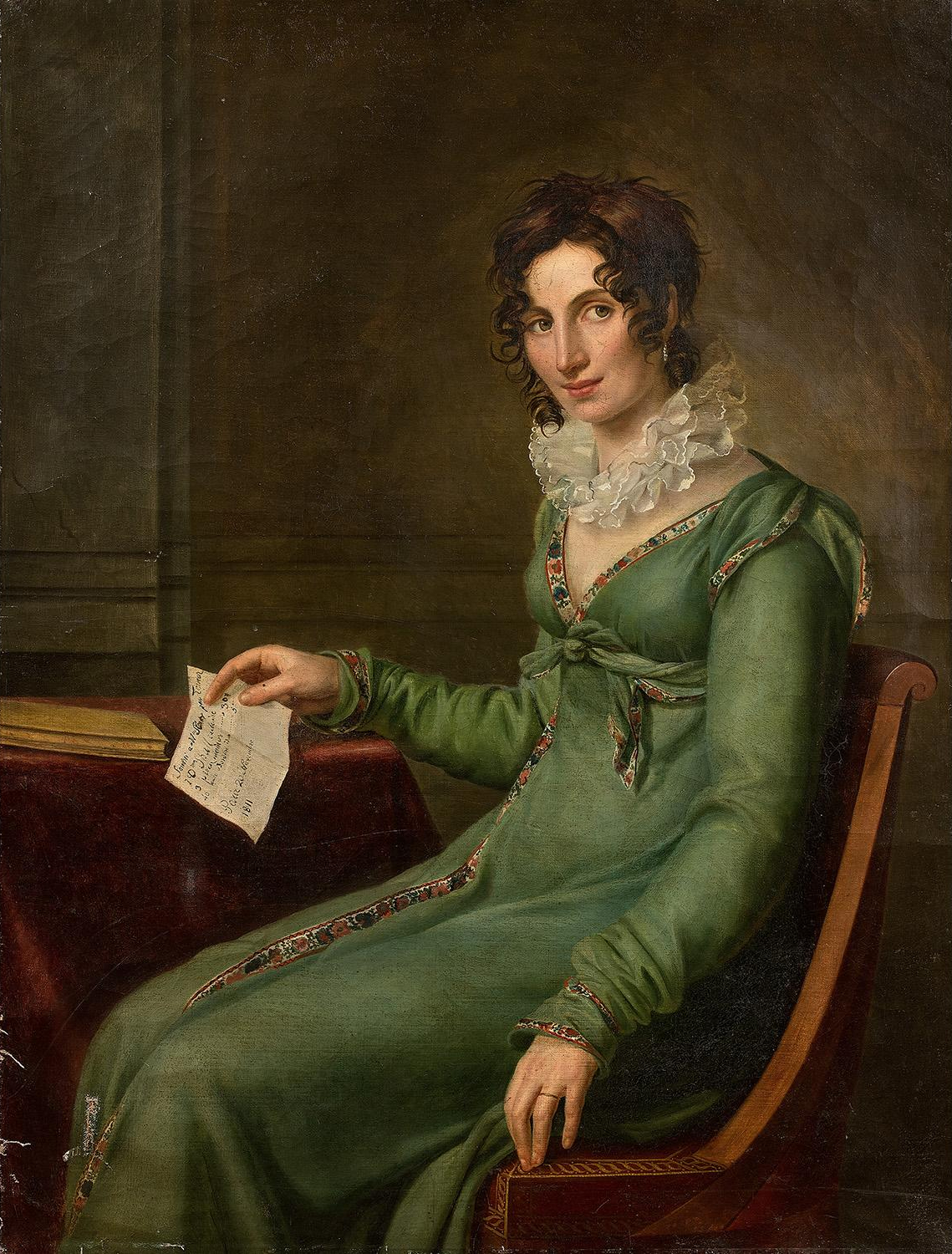
France, 1810

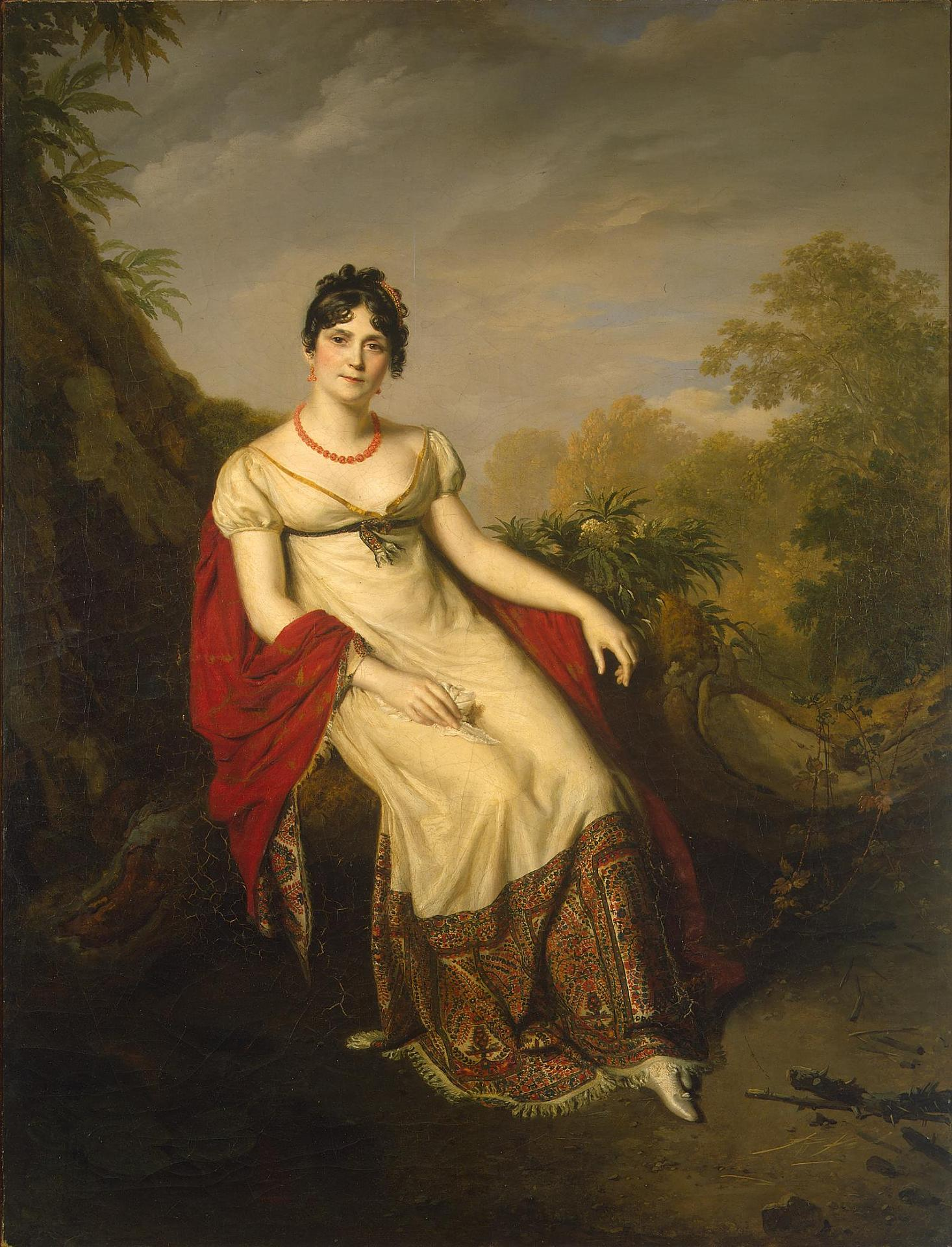
France, 1812

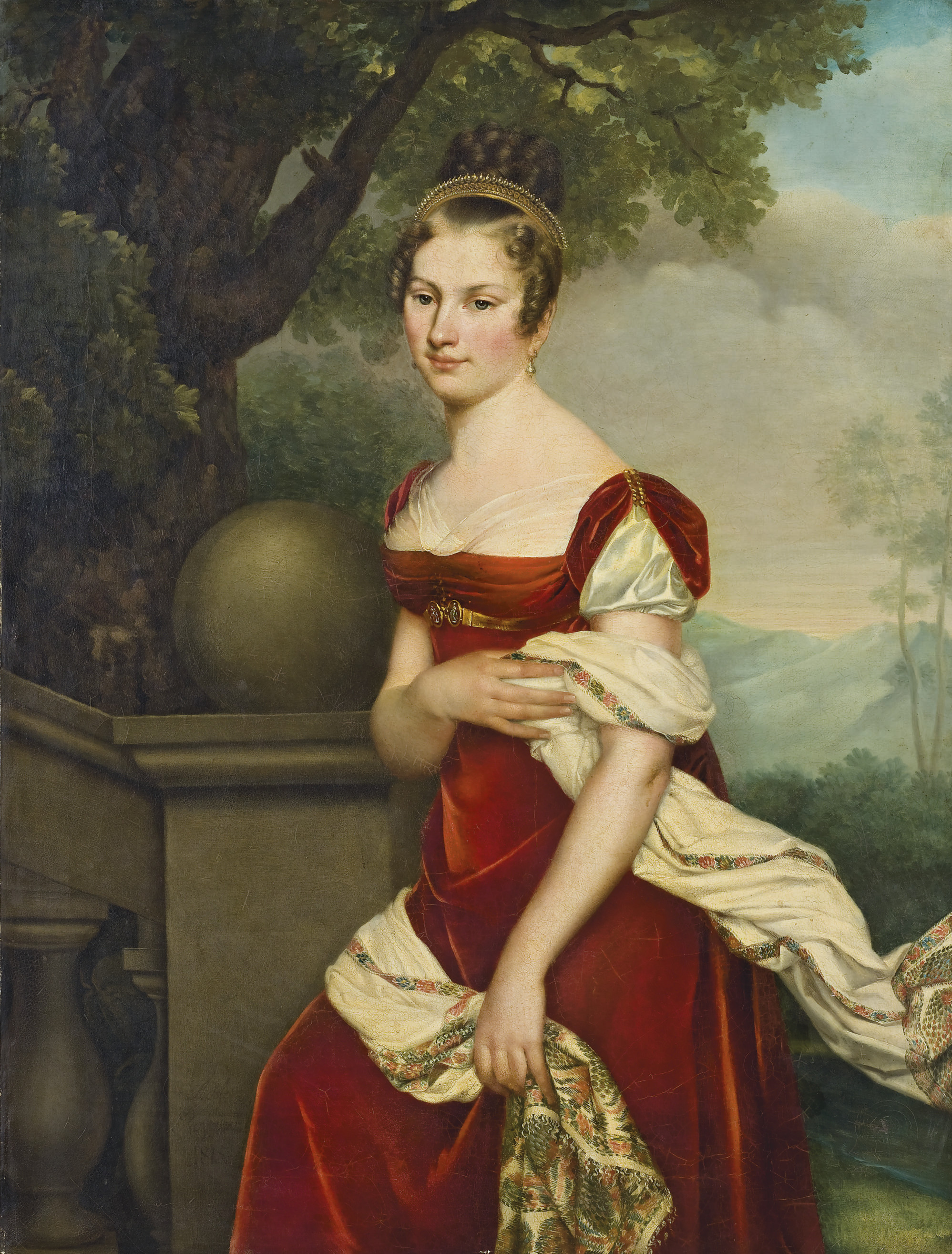
France, 1815

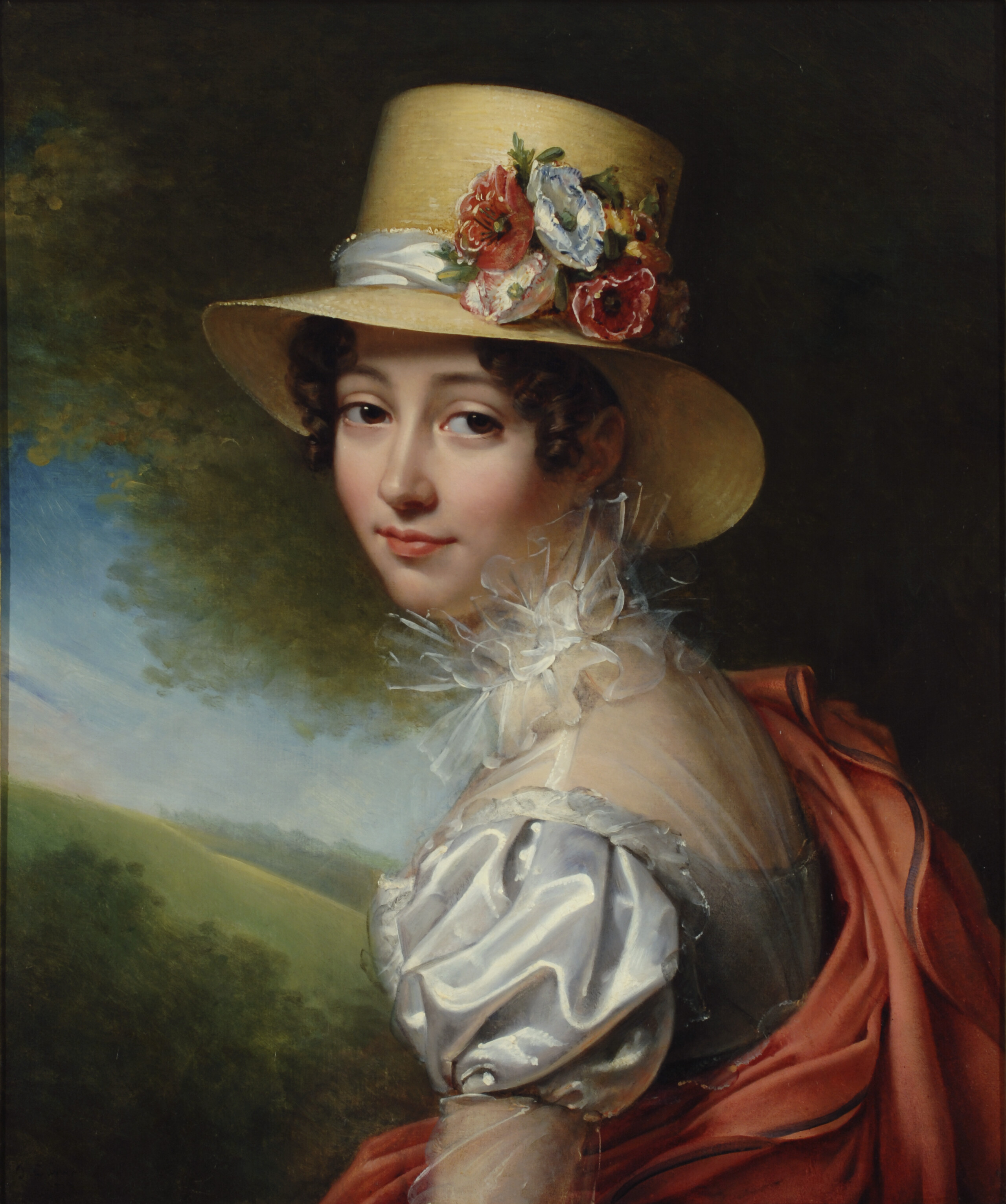
France, 1819

=== Illustrations ===
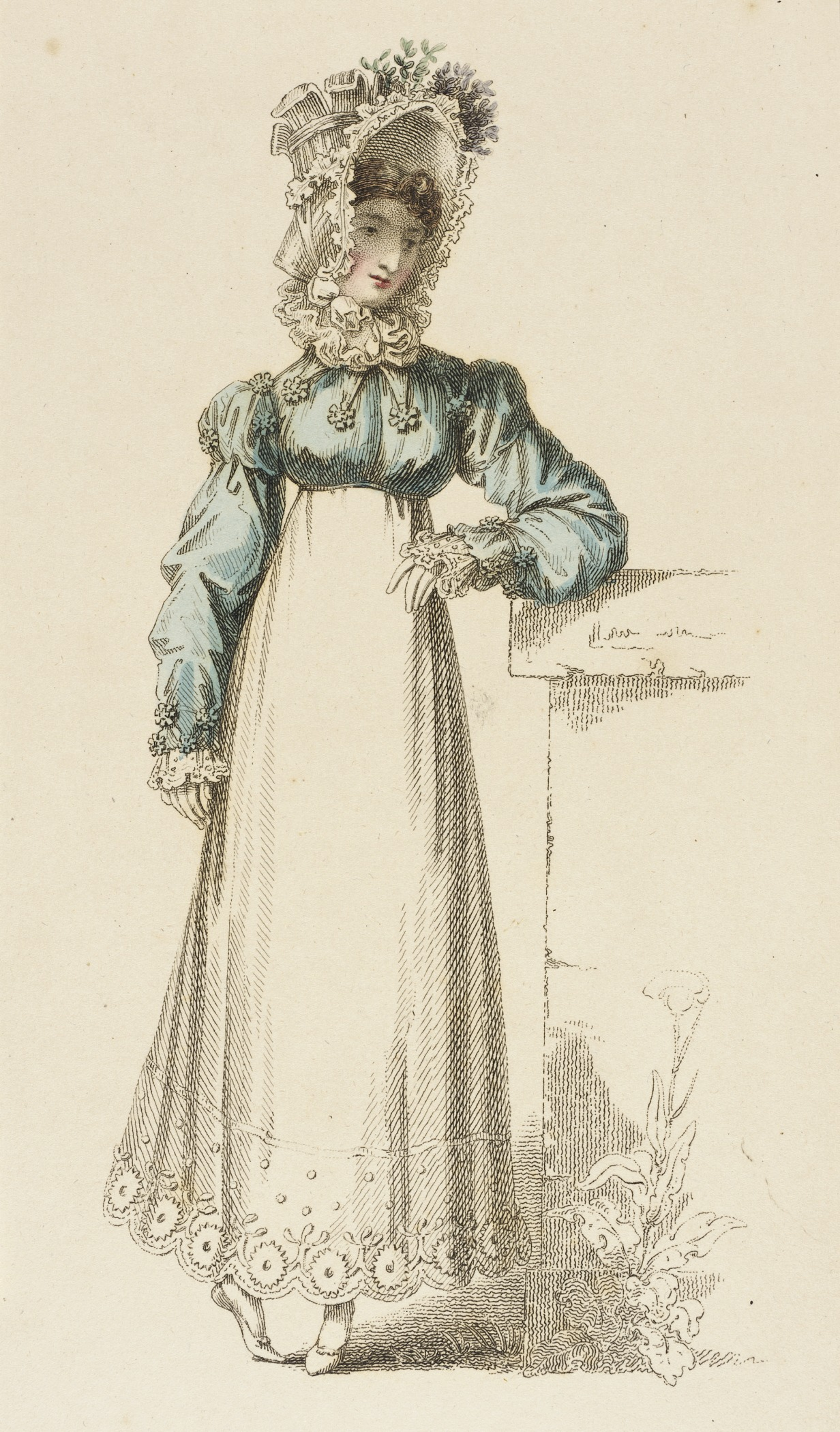
'Morning Dress' or 'Half Dress', 1817

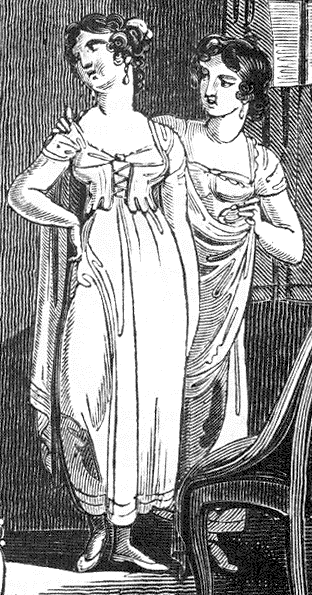
1811 illustration of underclothes, showing one form of Regency "stays"

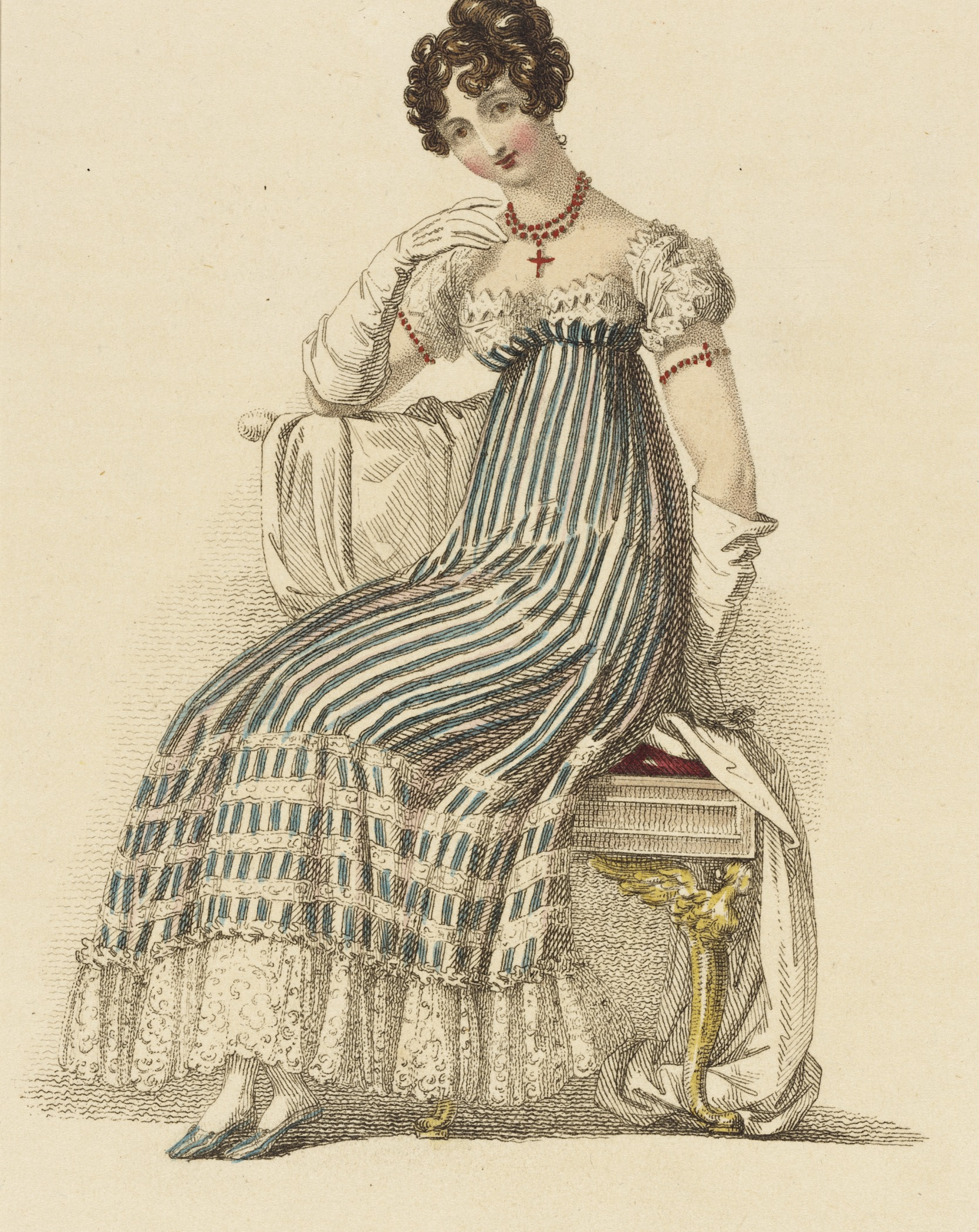
'Evening Dress', 1816

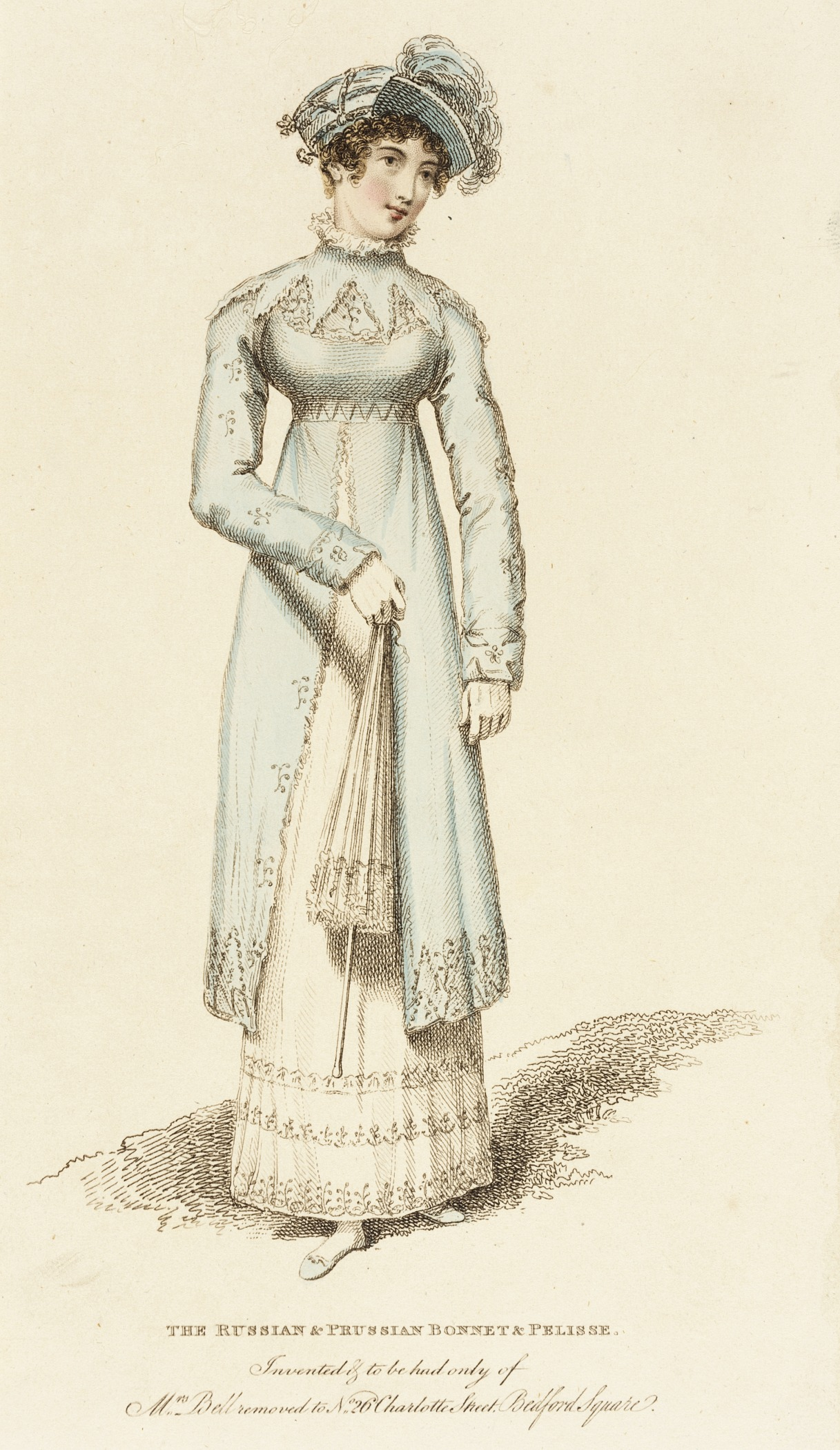
Fashion Plate (The Russian & Prussian Bonnet & Pelisse), published in La Belle Assemblée, July 1, 1814

== Men's fashion ==
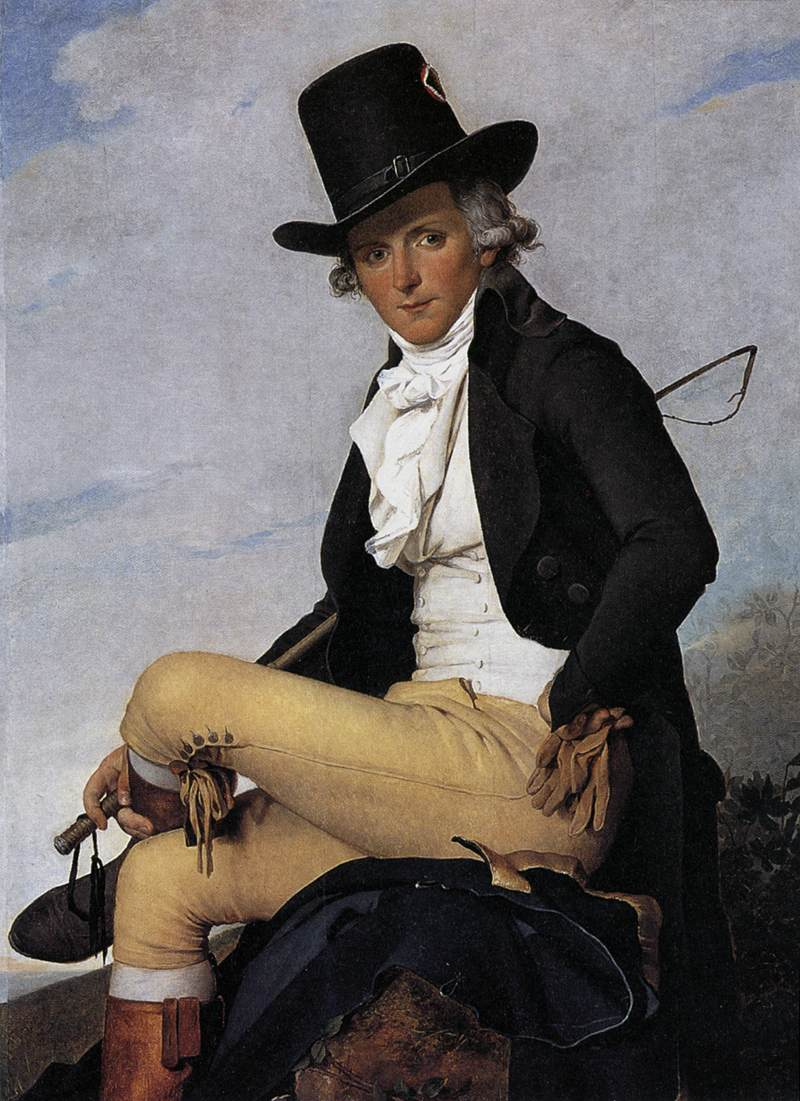
Pierre Seriziat in riding dress, 1795. His snug leather breeches have a tie and buttons at the knee and a fall front. The white waistcoat is double-breasted, a popular style at this time. His tall hat is slightly conical.

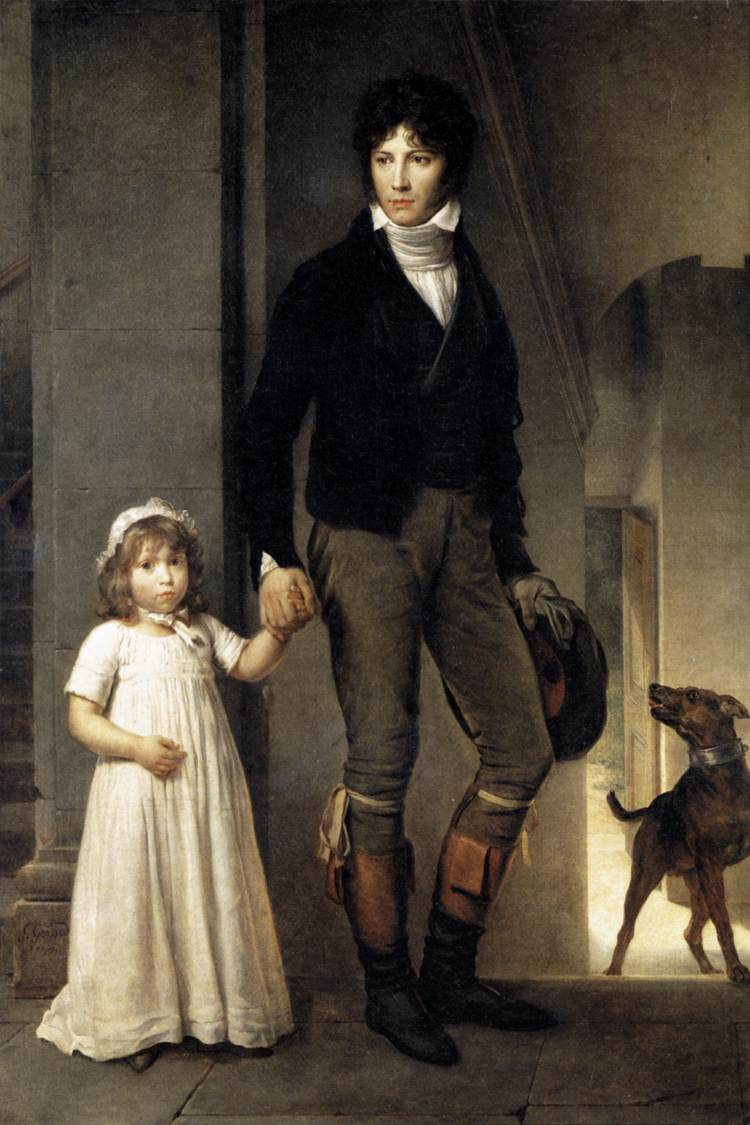
Artist Jean-Baptiste Isabey wears a cropped riding coat and dark breeches tucked into boots. He carries his hat and gloves. Jean-Baptiste Isabey and His Daughter, 1795.

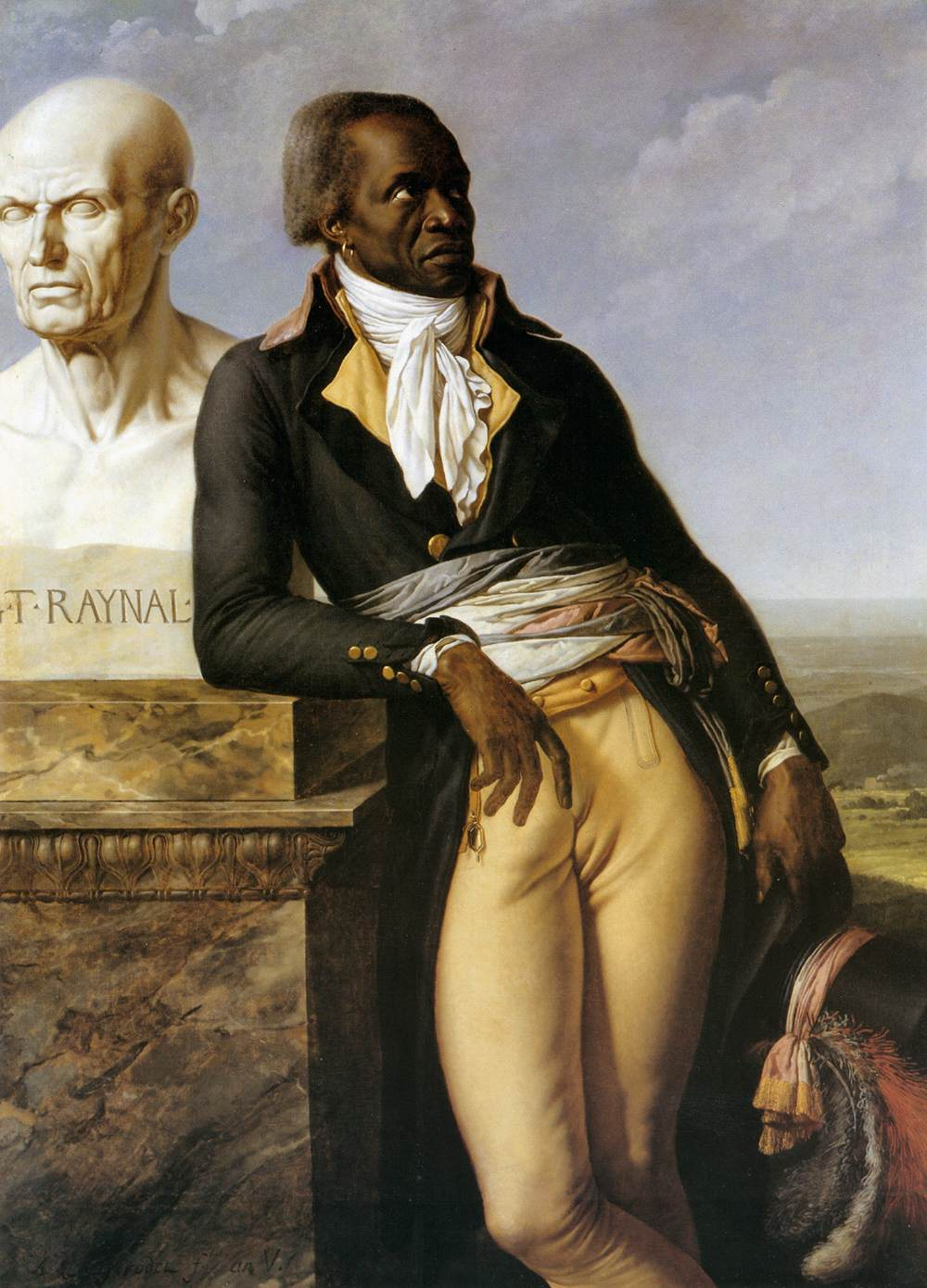
A Directoire dandy in 1797, by Girodet; Portrait of Jean-Baptiste Belley, Deputy for Saint-Domingue.

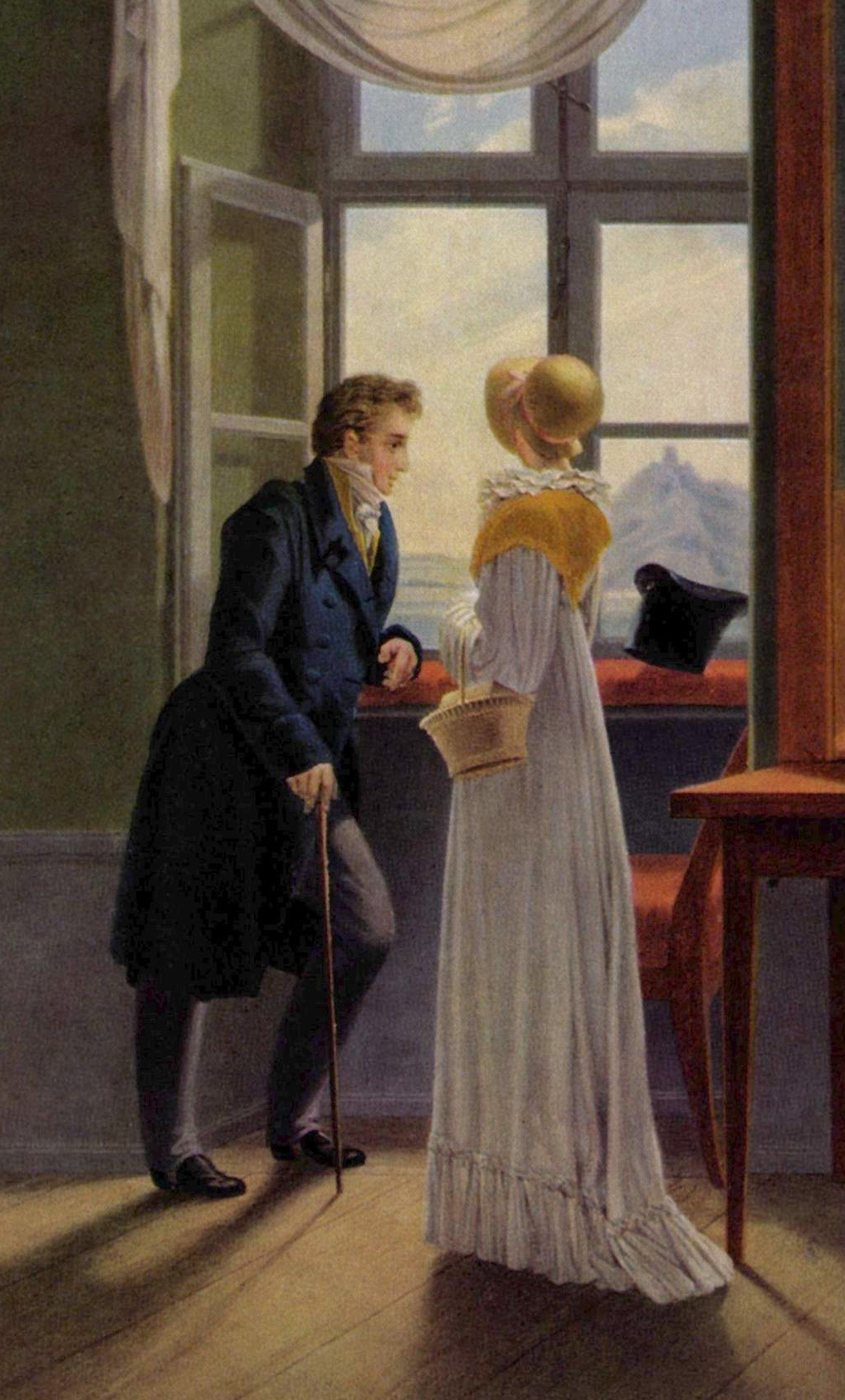
This gentleman wears a double-breasted frockcoat in dark blue over a buff waistcoat. His gray trousers have straps under his shoes. His slightly conical tall hat sits in the windowsill, Germany, c. 1815 (by Georg Friedrich Kersting).

=== Overview ===
This period saw the final abandonment of lace, embroidery, and other embellishments from serious men's clothing outside of formalized court dress—it would not reappear except as an affectation of Aesthetic dress in the 1880s and its successor, the "Young Edwardian" look of the 1960s. Instead, cut and tailoring became much more important as an indicator of quality. This transformation can be attributed in part to an increased interest in antiquity stemming from the discovery of classical engravings, including the Elgin Marbles. The figures depicted in classical art were viewed as an exemplar of the ideal natural form, and an embodiment of Neoclassical ideas. The style in London for men became more and more refined and this was due to the influence of two things: the dandy and the romantic movement. The dandy (a man who placed high importance on personal aesthetics) emerged as early as the 1790s. Dark colors were common. Blue tailcoats with gold buttons were everywhere. White muslin shirts (sometimes with ruffles on the neck/sleeves) were extremely popular. Breeches were officially on their way out, with pants/trousers taking their place. Fabrics in general were becoming more practical silk and more wool, cotton, and buckskin. Therefore, in the 18th century, the dress was simplified and greater emphasis was put on tailoring to enhance the natural form of the body.

This was also the period of the rise of hair wax for styling men's hair, as well as mutton chops as a style of facial hair.

Breeches became longer—tightly fitted leather riding breeches reached almost to the boot tops—and were replaced by pantaloons or trousers for fashionable streetwear. The French Revolution is largely responsible for altering the standard male dress. During the revolution, clothing symbolized the division between the upper classes and the working-class revolutionaries. French rebels earned the nickname sans-culottes, or "the people without breeches," because of the loose floppy trousers they popularized.

Coats were cutaway in front with long skirts or tails behind, and had tall standing collars. Lapels were not as large as they had been in years before and often featured an M-shaped notch unique to the period.

Shirts were made of linen, had attached collars, and were worn with stocks or wrapped in a cravat tied in various fashions. Pleated frills at the cuffs and the front opening went out of fashion by the end of the period.

Waistcoats were high-waisted, and squared off at the bottom, but came in a broad variety of styles. They were often double-breasted, with wide lapels and stand collars. Around 1805 large lapels that overlapped those of the jacket began to fall out of fashion, as did the 18th-century tradition of wearing the coat unbuttoned, and gradually waistcoats became less visible. Shortly before this time waistcoats were commonly vertically striped but by 1810 plain white waistcoats were increasingly fashionable, as did horizontally striped waistcoats. High-collared waistcoats were fashionable until 1815, then collars were gradually lowered as the shawl collar came into use toward the end of this period.

Overcoats or greatcoats were fashionable, often with contrasting collars of fur or velvet. The garrick, sometimes called a coachman's coat, was a particularly popular style, and had between three and five short caplets attached to the collar.

Boots, typically Hessian boots with heart-shaped tops and tassels were a mainstay in men's footwear. After the Duke of Wellington defeated Napoleon at Waterloo in 1815, Wellington boots, as they were known, became the rage; tops were knee-high in front and cut lower in back. The jockey boot, with a turned-down cuff of lighter colored leather, had previously been popular but continued to be worn for riding. Court shoes with elevated heels became popular with the introduction of trousers.

=== The rise of the dandy ===
The clothes-obsessed dandy first appeared in the 1790s, both in London and Paris. In the slang of the time, a dandy was differentiated from a fop in that the dandy's dress was more refined and sober. The dandy prided himself in "natural excellence" and tailoring allowed for exaggeration of the natural figure beneath fashionable outerwear.

In High Society: A Social History of the Regency Period, 1788–1830, Venetia Murray writes:

Other admirers of dandyism have taken the view that it is a sociological phenomenon, the result of a society in a state of transition or revolt. Barbey d'Aurevilly, one of the leading French dandies at the end of the nineteenth century, explained:

"Some have imagined that dandyism is primarily a specialisation in the art of dressing oneself with daring and elegance. It is that, but much else as well. It is a state of mind made up of many shades, a state of mind produced in old and civilised societies where gaiety has become infrequent or where conventions rule at the price of their subject's boredom...it is the direct result of the endless warfare between respectability and boredom."

In Regency London dandyism was a revolt against a different kind of tradition, an expression of distaste for the extravagance and ostentation of the previous generation, and of sympathy with the new mood of democracy.

Beau Brummell set the fashion for dandyism in British society from the mid-1790s, which was characterized by immaculate personal cleanliness, immaculate linen shirts with high collars, perfectly tied cravats, and exquisitely tailored plain dark coats (contrasting in many respects with the "maccaroni" of the earlier 18th century).

Brummell abandoned his wig and cut his hair short in a Roman fashion dubbed à la Brutus, echoing the fashion for all things classical seen in women's wear of this period. He also led the move from breeches to snugly tailored pantaloons or trousers, often light-colored for day and dark for the evening, based on working-class clothing adopted by all classes in France in the wake of the Revolution. In fact, Brummell's reputation for taste and refinement was such that, fifty years after his death, Max Beerbohm, wrote:

In certain congruities of dark cloth, in the rigid perfection of his linen, in the symmetry of his glove with his hand, lay the secret of Mr Brummell's miracles.

Not every male aspiring to attain Brummell's sense of elegance and style succeeded, however, and these dandies were subject to caricature and ridicule. Venetia Murray quotes an excerpt from Diary of an Exquisite, from The Hermit in London, 1819:

Took four hours to dress; and then it rained; ordered the tilbury and my umbrella, and drove to the fives' court; next to my tailors; put him off after two years tick; no bad fellow that Weston...broke three stay-laces and a buckle, tore the quarter of a pair of shoes, made so thin by O'Shaughnessy, in St. James's Street, that they were light as brown paper; what a pity they were lined with pink satin, and were quite the go; put on a pair of Hoby's; over-did it in perfuming my handkerchief, and had to recommence de novo; could not please myself in tying my cravat; lost three quarters of an hour by that, tore two pairs of kid gloves in putting them hastily on; was obliged to go gently to work with the third; lost another quarter of an hour by this; drove off furiously in my chariot but had to return for my splendid snuff-box, as I knew that I should eclipse the circle by it.

=== Men's hairstyles and headgear ===
Transformation of men's fashion during a lifetime
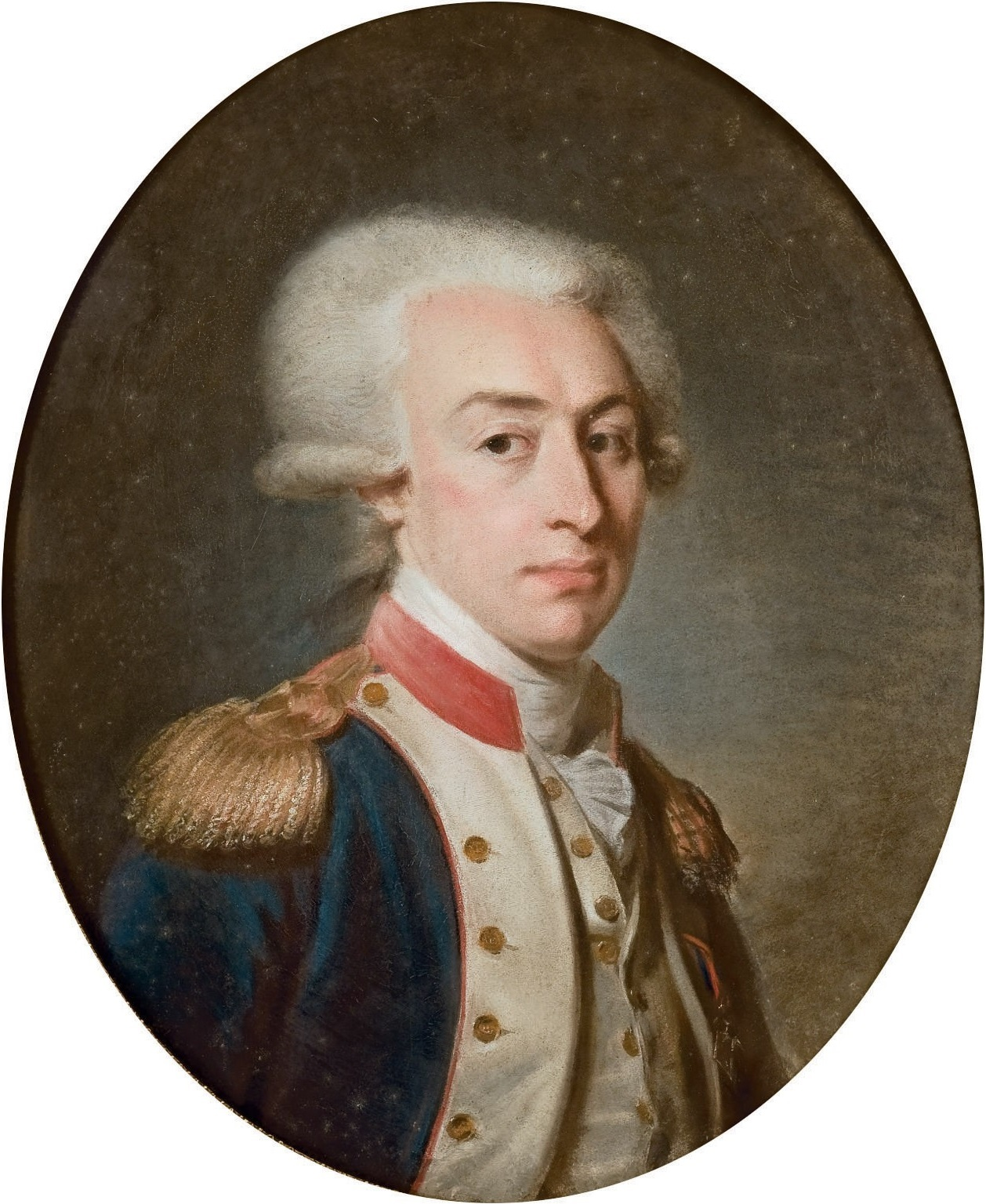
Marquis de Lafayette (1757–1834) wearing a powdered wig tied in a queue that was a common piece of men's dress by c. 1795.

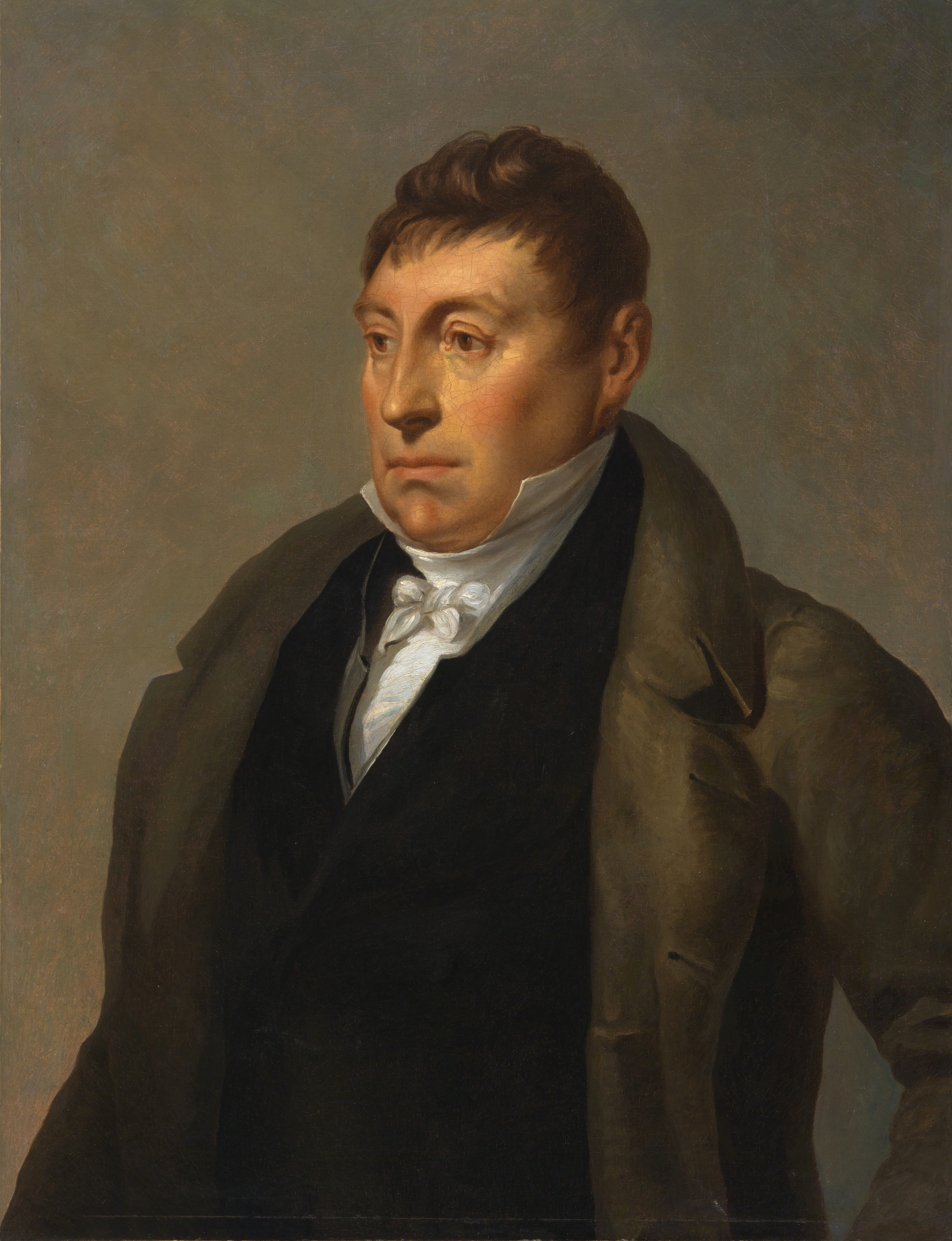
Marquis de Lafayette depicted in later years of his life, dressed according to the fashion of the 1820s.

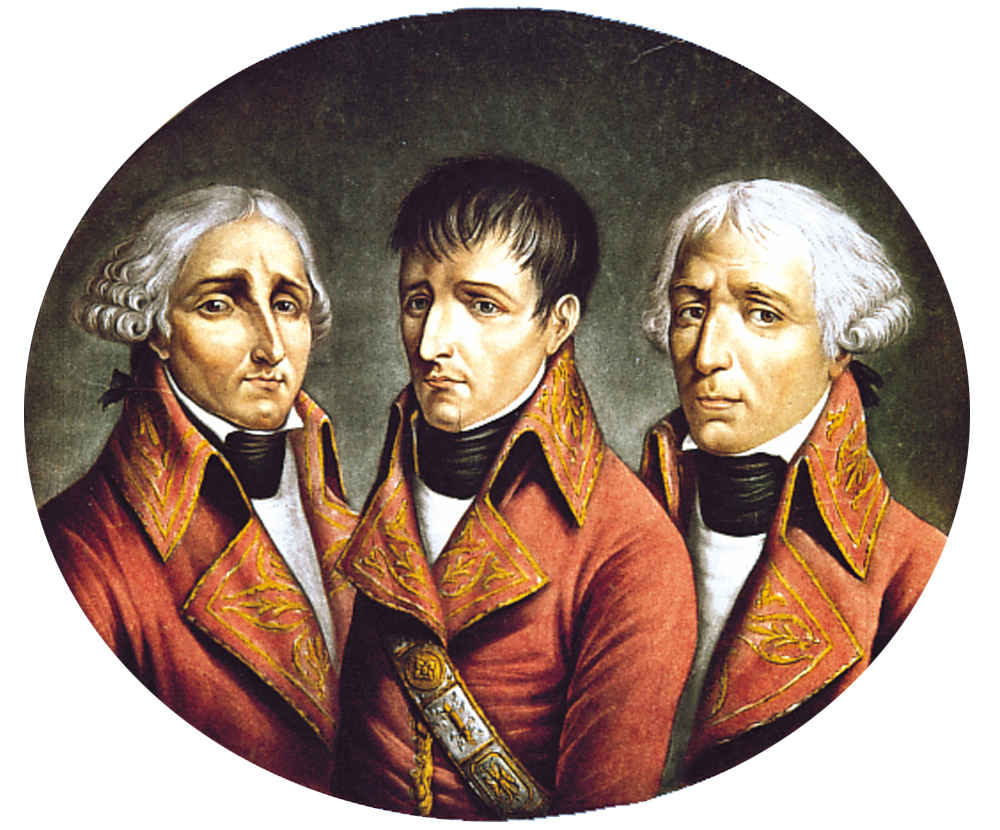
The three Consuls of the French Republic in 1799-1804 : (L-R) Cambacérès (1753-1824), Napoleon Bonaparte (1769-1821), and Lebrun (1739-1824). While the older ones wear powdered wigs, younger Napoleon wears a short unpowdered hairstyle.

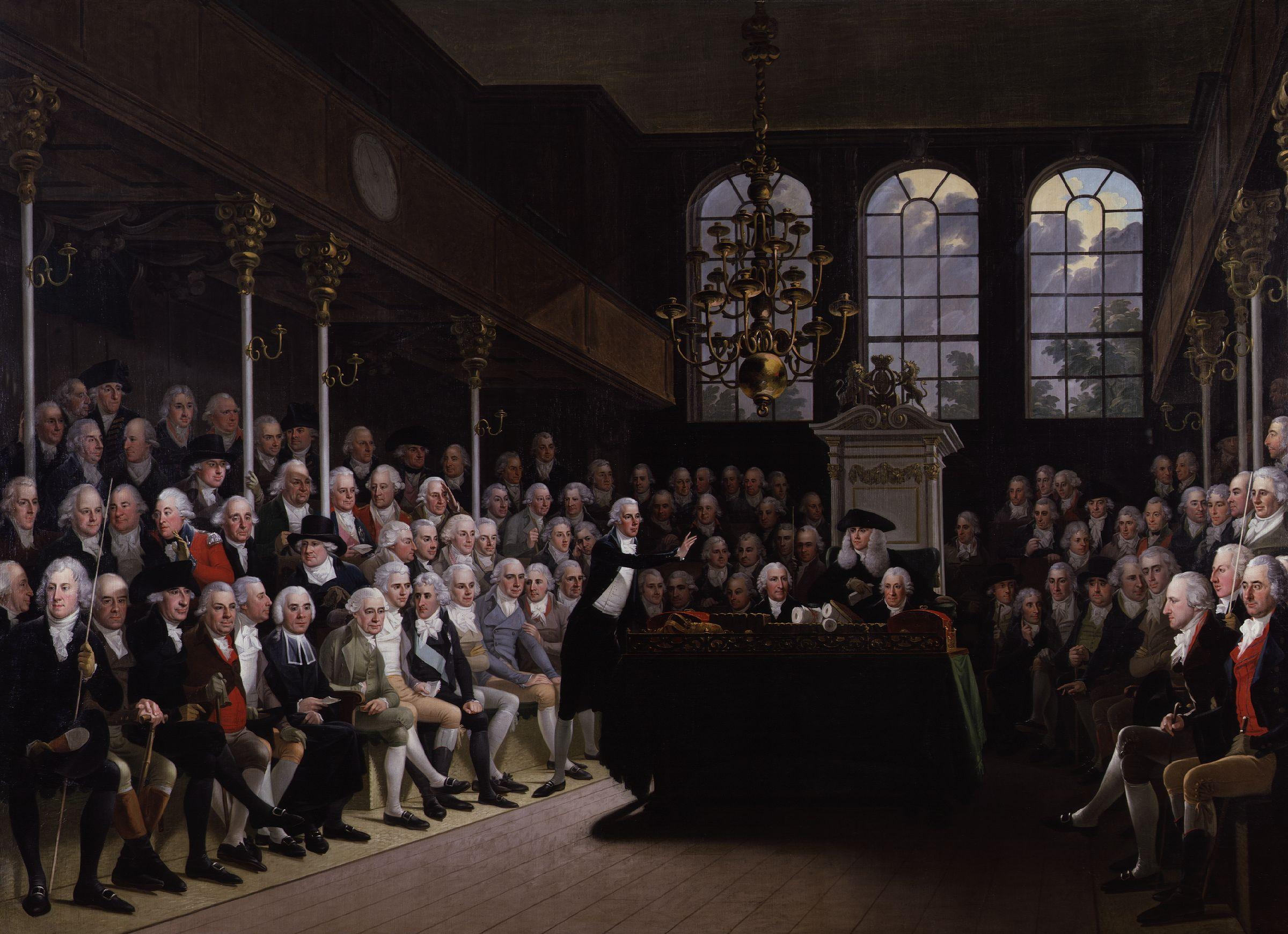
William Pitt the Younger (1759-1806) in Parliament in 1793. Pitt and members of Parliament wore powdered wigs at that time; in 1795 Parliament passed the Duty on Hair Powder Act which caused the demise of the fashion for both wigs and powder.

The French Revolution (1789-1799) in France and the Pitt's hair powder tax in 1795 in Britain effectively ended the fashion for both wigs and powder in these countries and younger men of fashion in both countries began to wear their own unpowdered hair without a queue in short curls, often with long sideburns. The new styles like the Brutus ("à la Titus") and the Bedford Crop became fashionable and subsequently spread also in other European and European-influenced countries including the United States.

Many notable men during this period, especially younger ones, followed this new fashion trend of short unpowdered hairstyles, e.g. Napoleon Bonaparte (1769-1821), initially wearing long hair tied in a queue, changed his hairstyle and cut his hair short while in Egypt in 1798. Likewise the future U.S. President John Quincy Adams (1767-1848) who had worn a powdered wig and long hair tied in a queue in his youth, abandoned this fashion during this period while serving as the U.S. Minister to Russia (1809-1814) and later became the first president to adopt a short haircut instead of long powdered hair tied in a queue. Older men, military officers, and those in conservative professions such as lawyers, judges, physicians, and servants retained their wigs and powder. Formal court dress of European monarchies also still required a powdered wig or long powdered hair tied in a queue until the accession of Napoleon to the throne as emperor in 1804.

Tricorne and bicorne hats were still worn, but the most fashionable hat was tall and slightly conical; this would soon, however, be displaced by the top hat and reign as the only hat for formal occasions for the next century.

=== Style gallery 1795–1809 ===
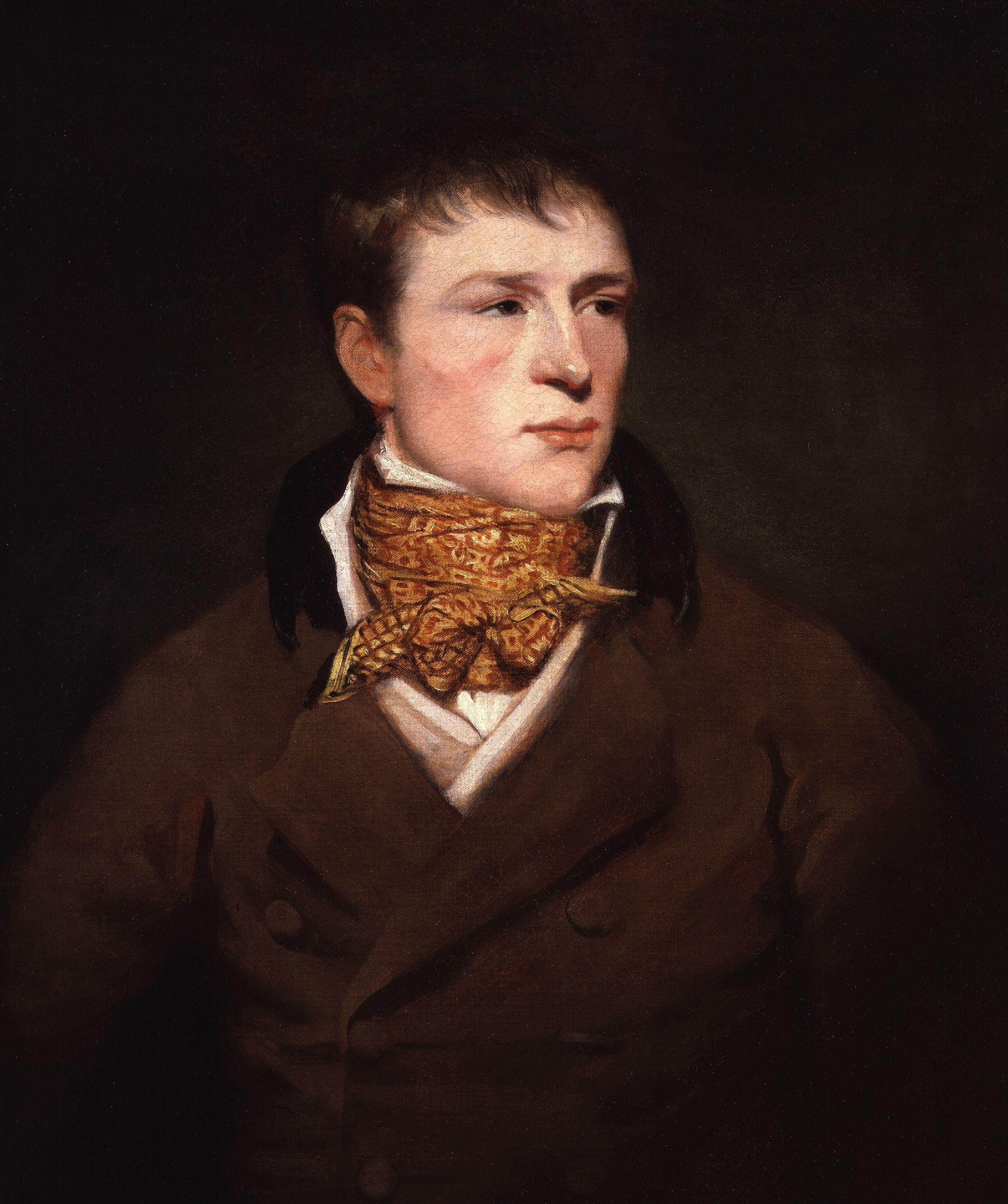
1 – c. 1800

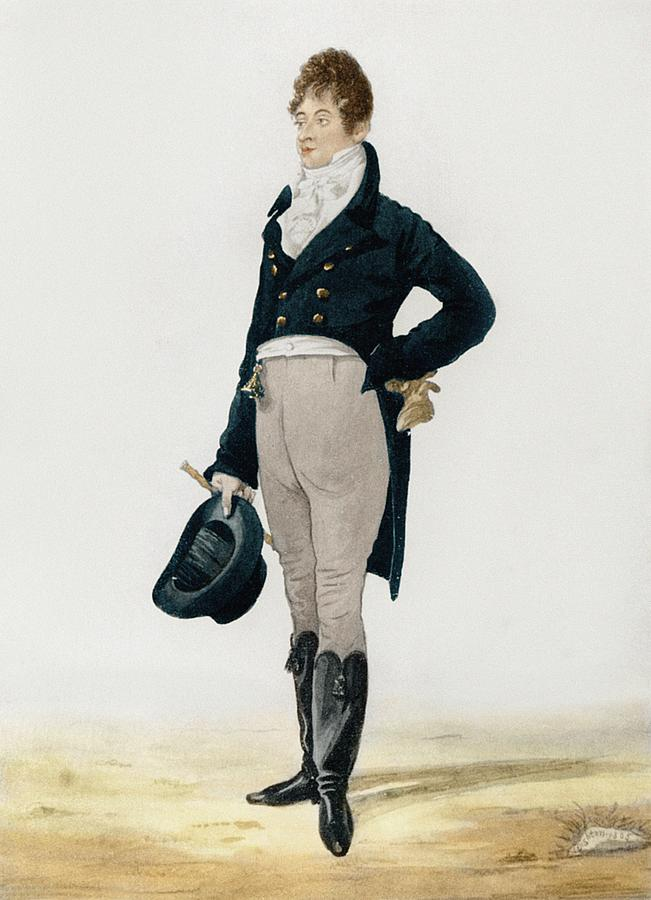
2 – 1805

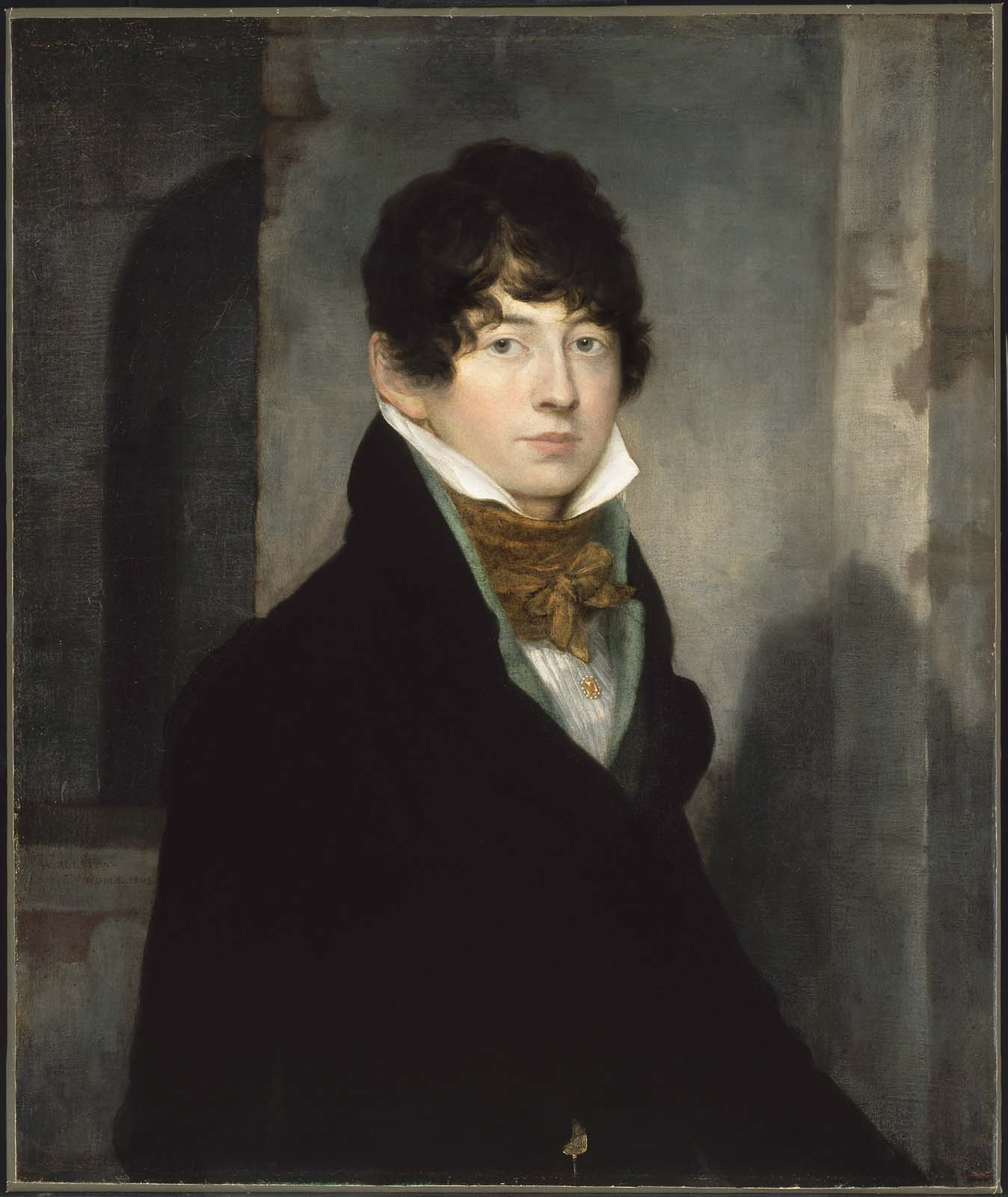
3 – 1805

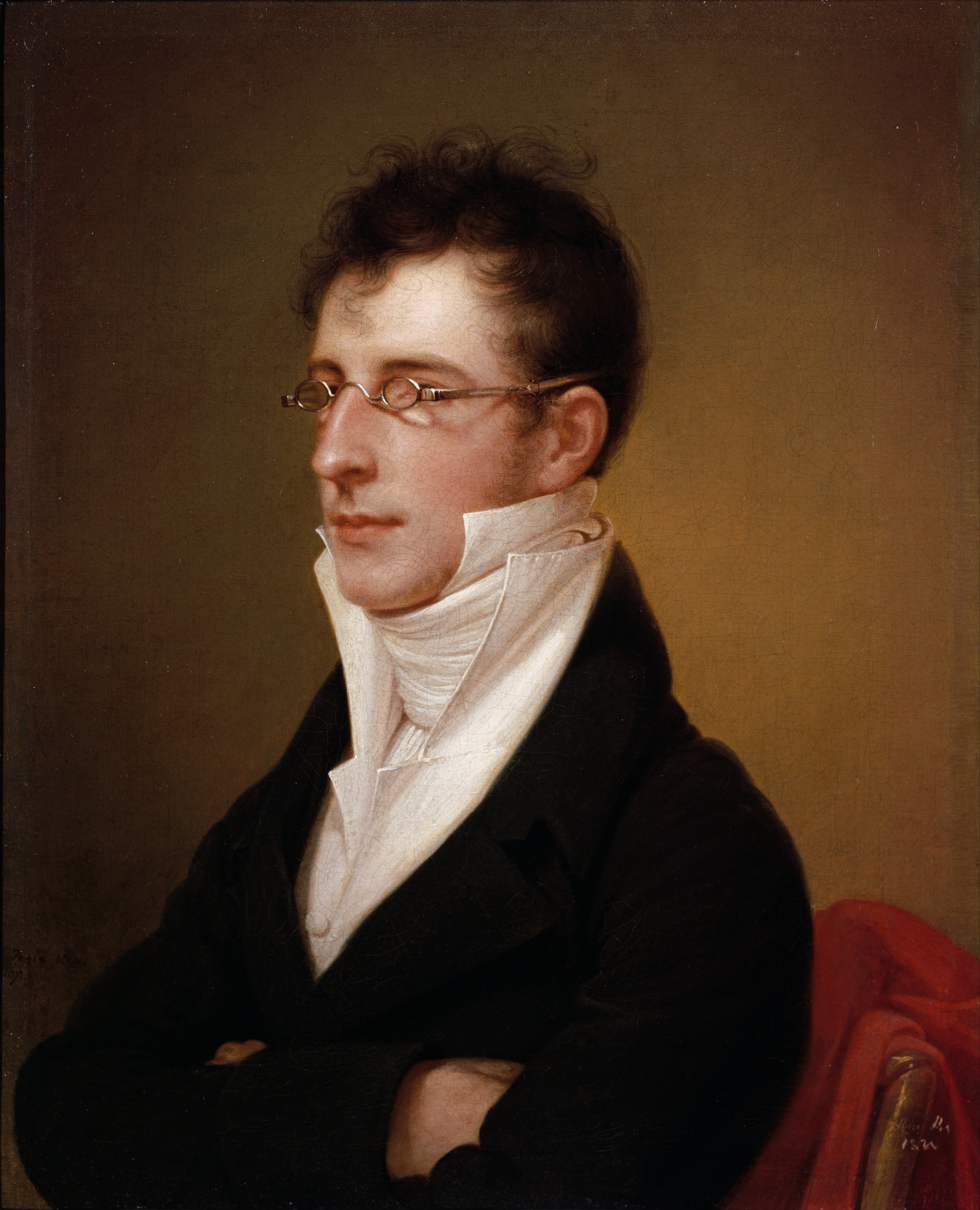
4 – 1807

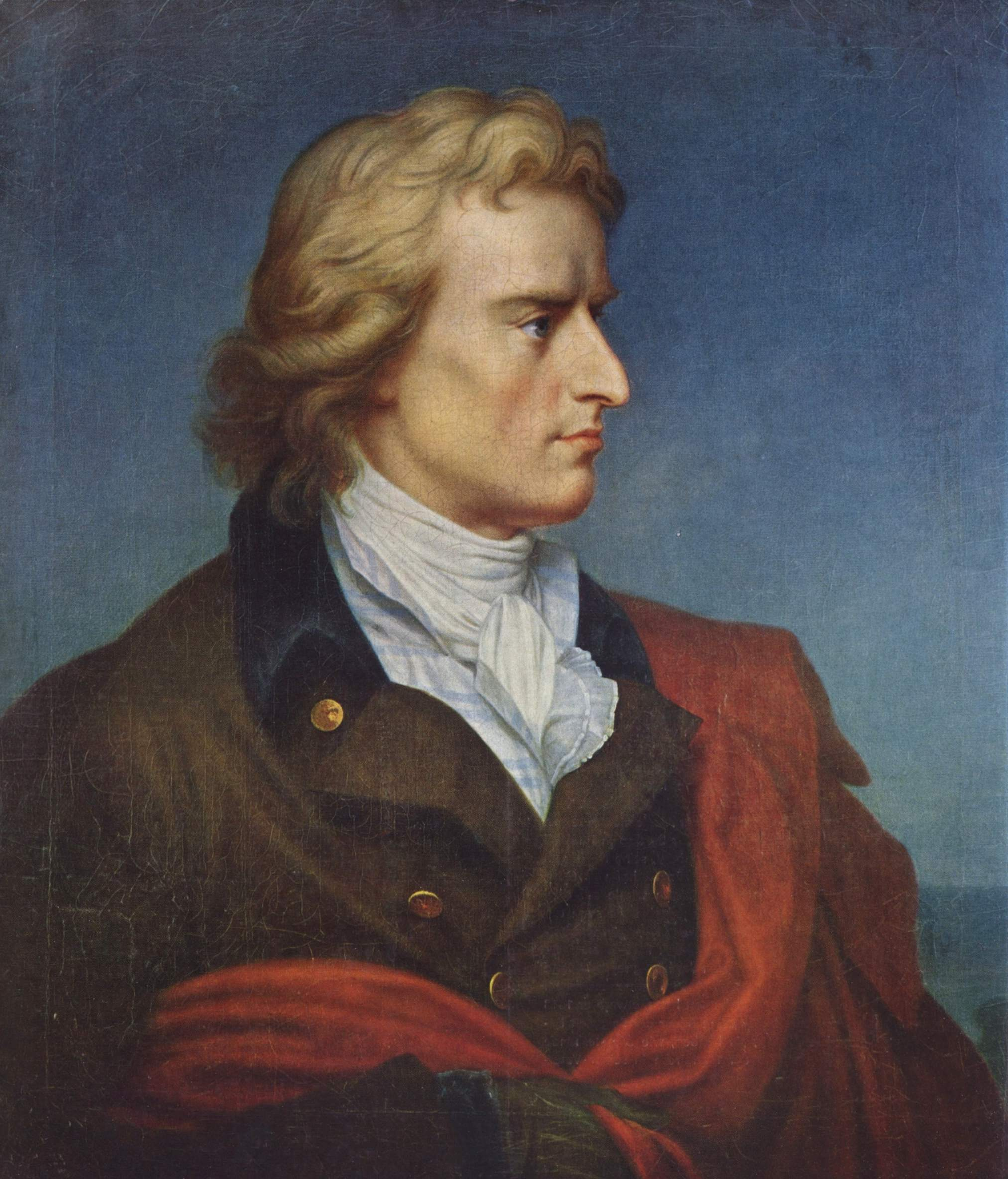
5 – 1808–09

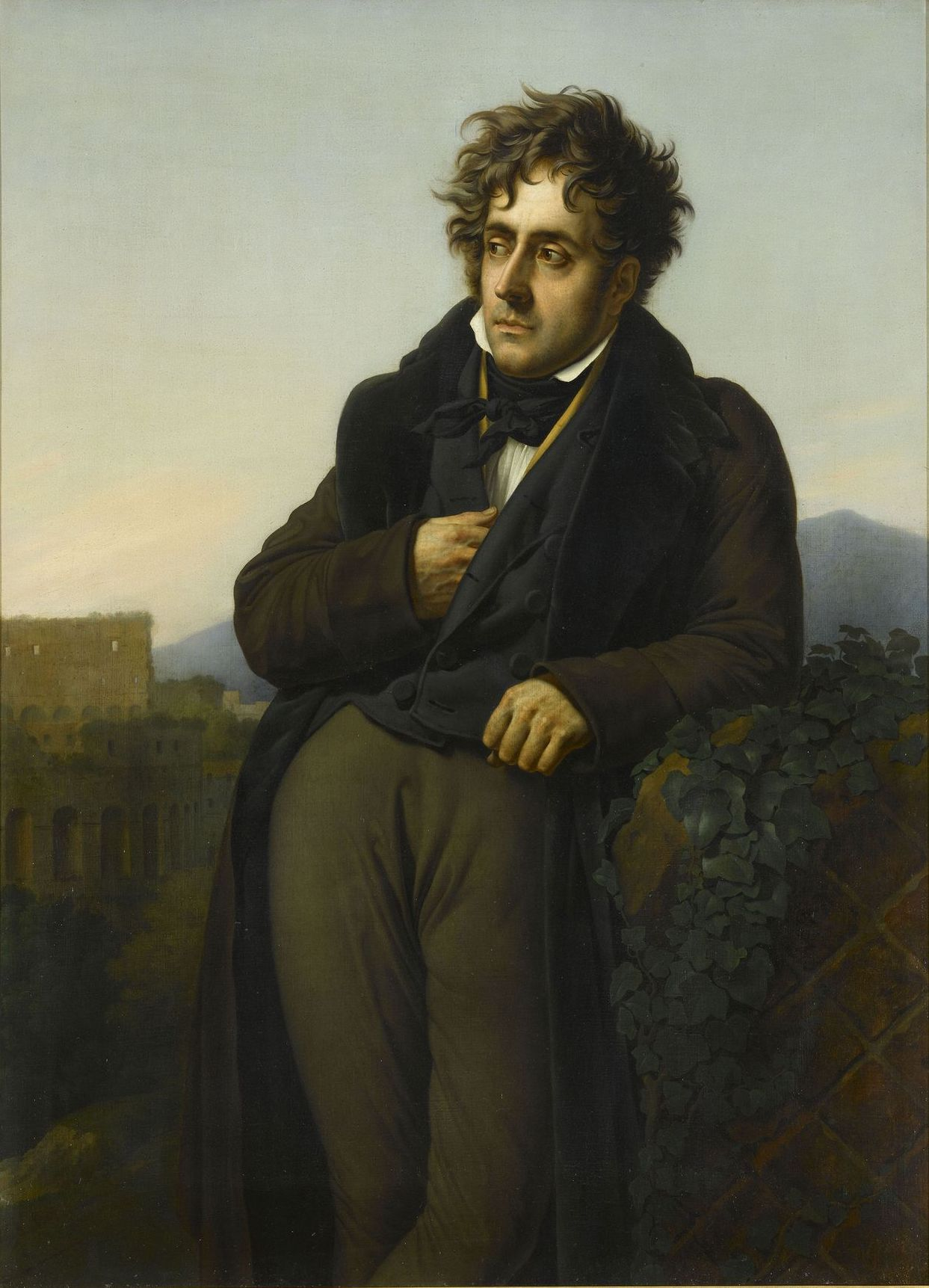
6 – 1808

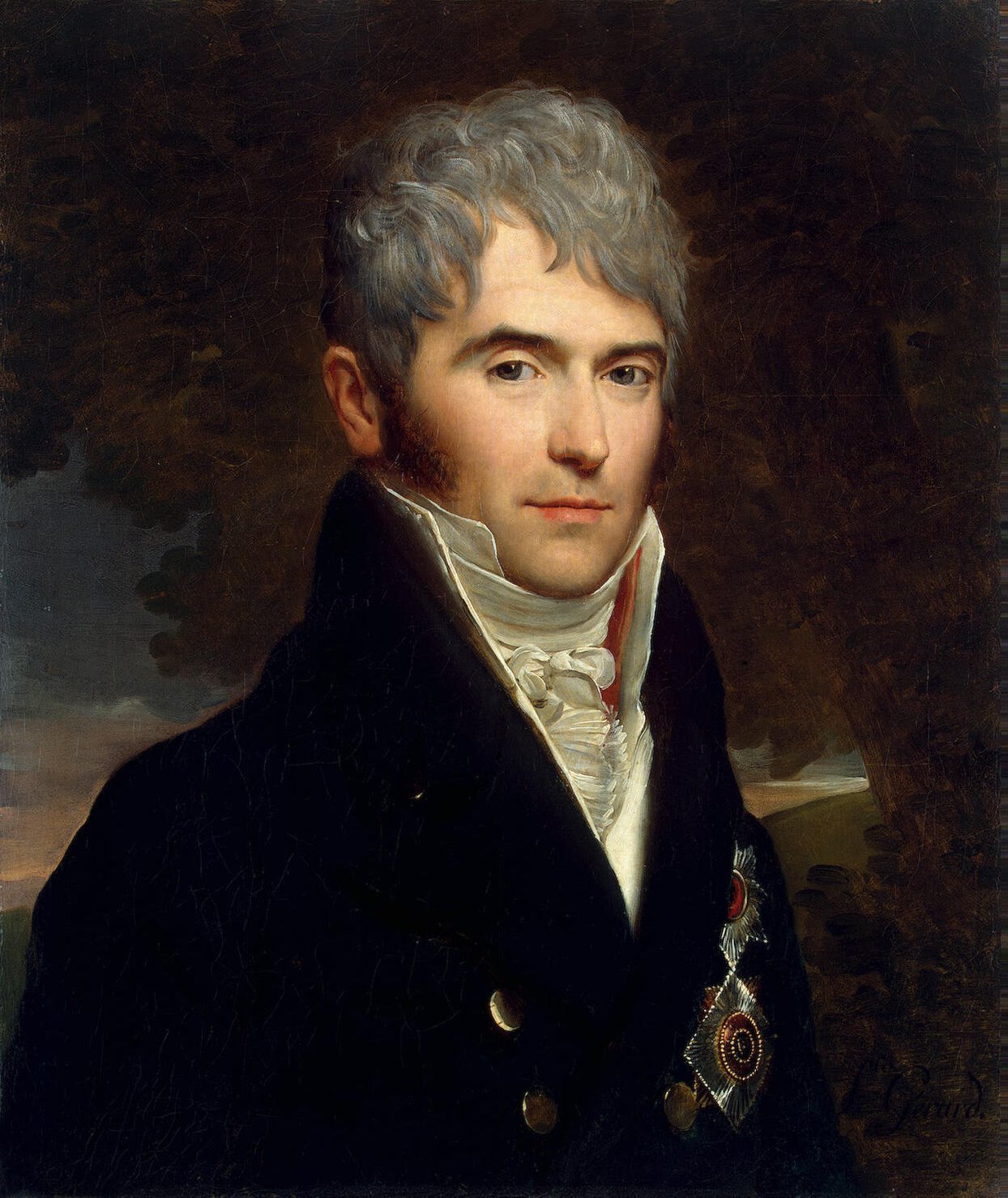
7 – 1809

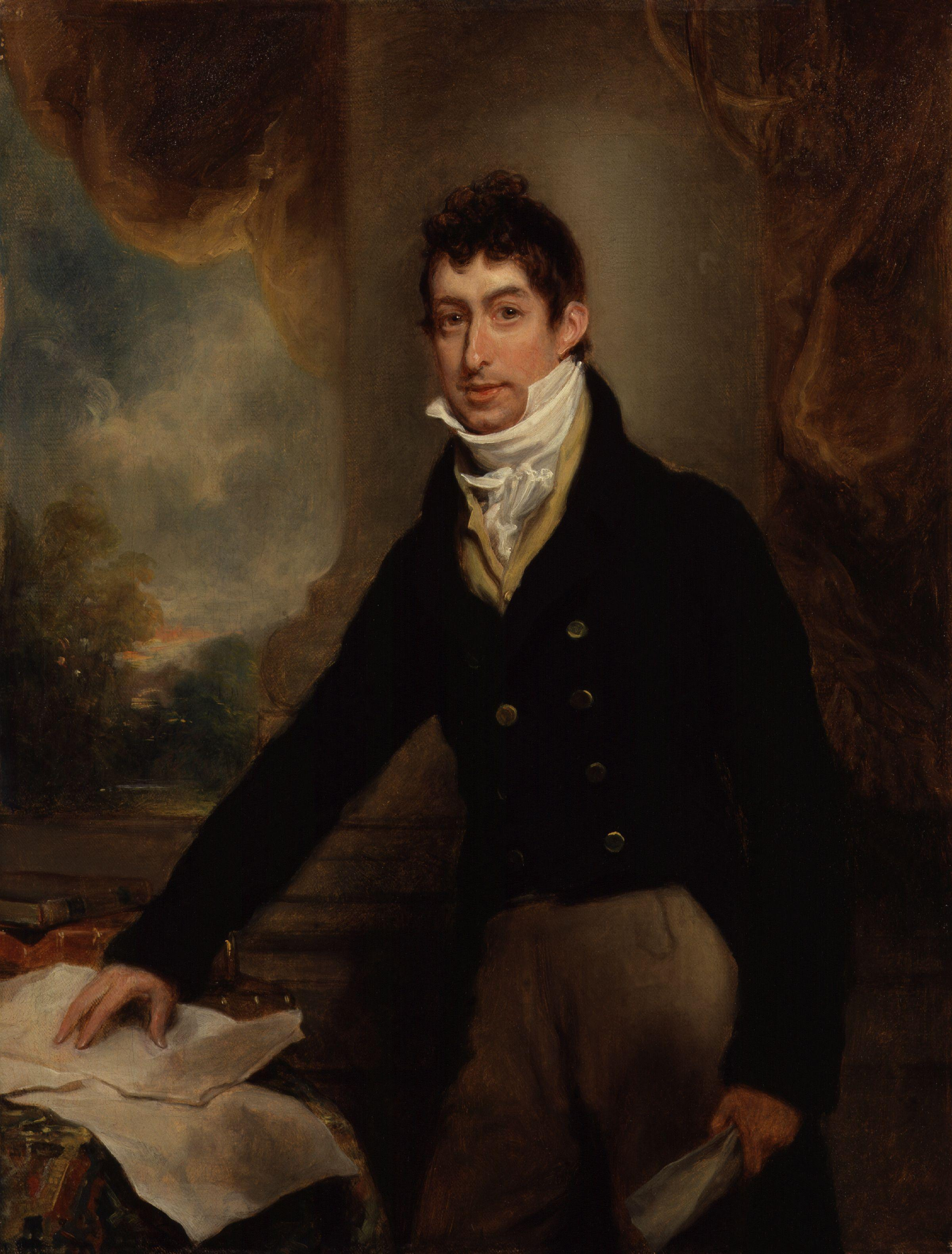
8 – 1809

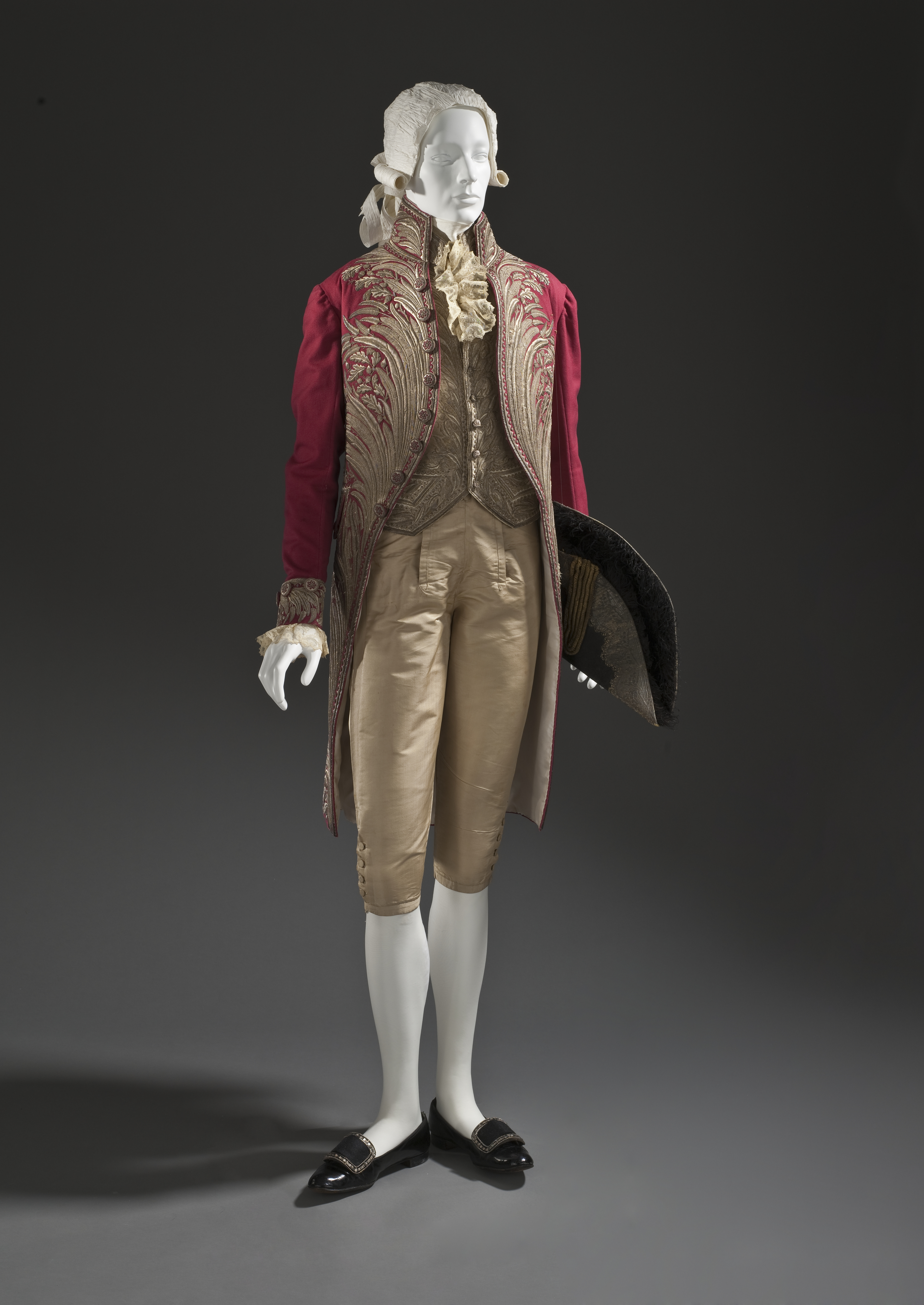
9 - 1800-1810

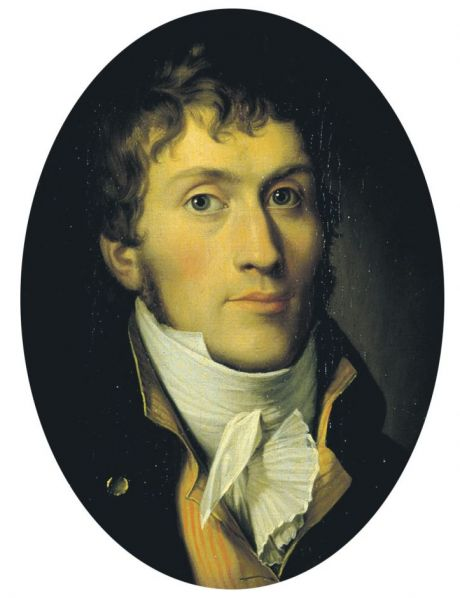
10 - 1808-09
1. Portrait of boxer "Jem" Belcher wearing a patterned cravat and a double-breasted brown coat with a dark (fur or velvet?) collar, c. 1800.
2. Watercolor of Beau Brummell by Richard Dighton.
3. In this self-portrait of 1805, Washington Allston wears a tan cravat with his high white collar and dark coat. Boston.
4. Rubens Peale wears a white waistcoat with a tall upright notched collar over his high shirt collar and wide cravat. America, 1807.
5. Friedrich von Schiller wears a brown double-breasted coat with a contrasting collar and brass buttons. The pleated frill of his shirt front can be seen next to the knot of his white cravat, Germany, 1808–09.
6. Portrait of Chateaubriand. The French writer Chateaubriand has fashionably tousled hair. He wears a long redingote over his coat, tan waistcoat, white shirt, and dark cravat, 1809.
7. Count Victor Kochubey's collar reaches his chin, and his cravat is wrapped around his neck and tied in a small bow. His short hair is casually dressed and falls over his forehead, 1809.
8. Portrait of Gwyllym Lloyd Wardle depicts him in a dark coat over a tan waistcoat and high collar and cravat, 1809.
9. Elaborate embroidery remained a feature of formal court suits like this one, which pairs a red wool coat with a cloth-of-silver waistcoat, both embroidered in silver thread. Italy, c. 1800–1810. Los Angeles County Museum of Art, M.80.60a-b.
10. Portrait of Danish adventurer Jørgen Jørgensen shows how Scandinavian society has viewed men's fashion in the Age of Revolution.

=== Style gallery 1810–1820 ===
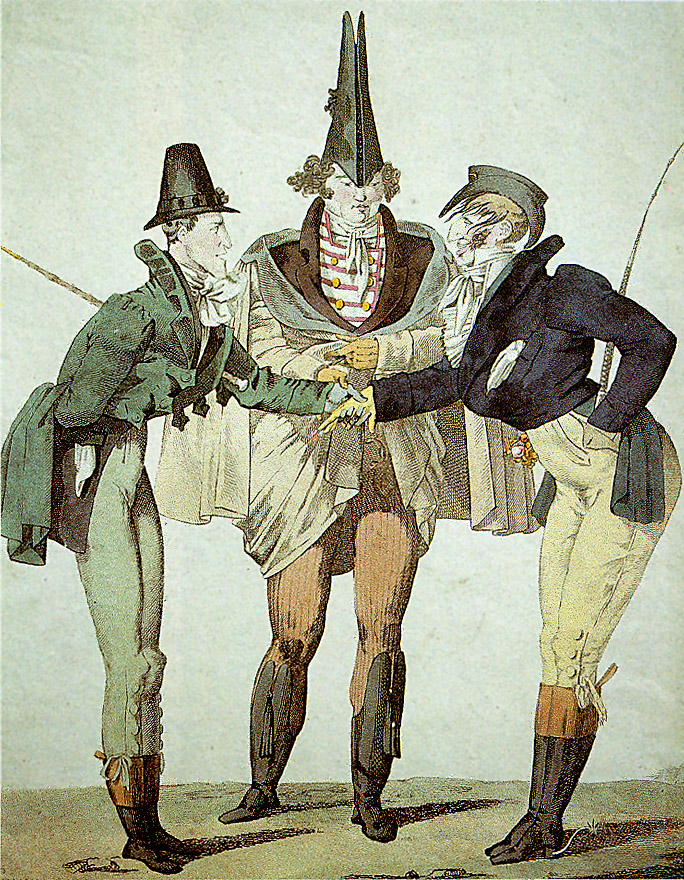
1 – 1810

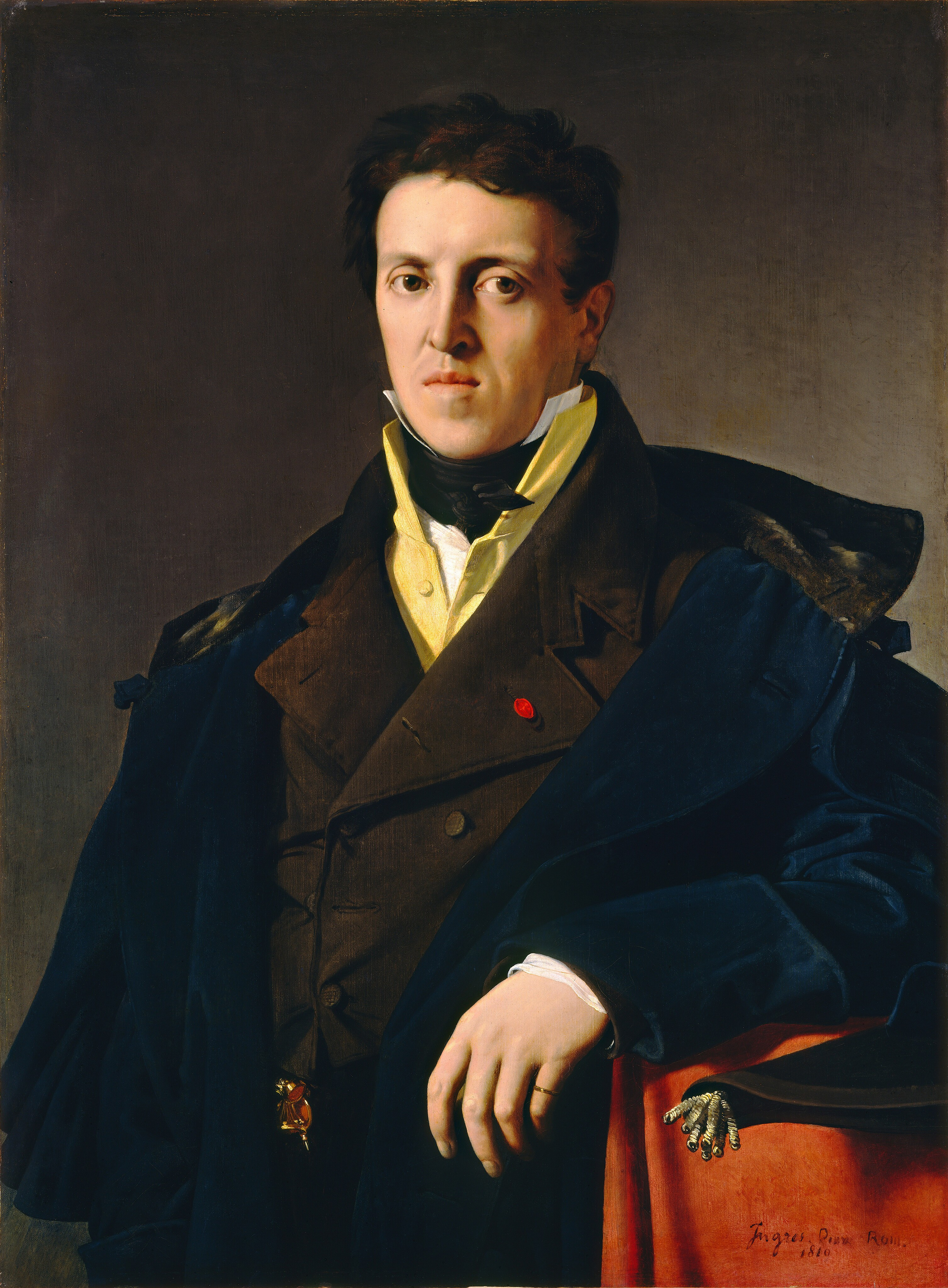
2 – 1810

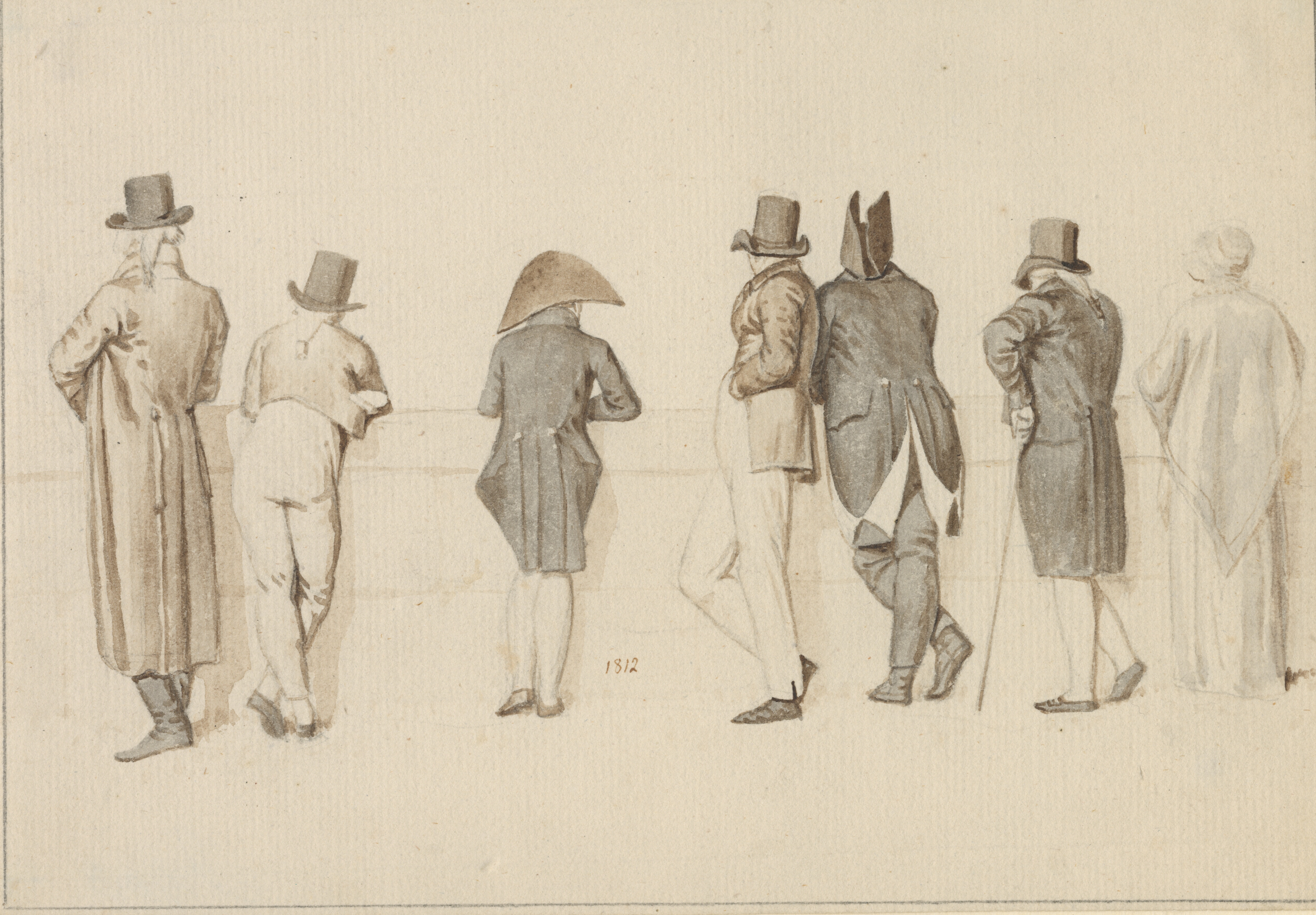
3 – 1812

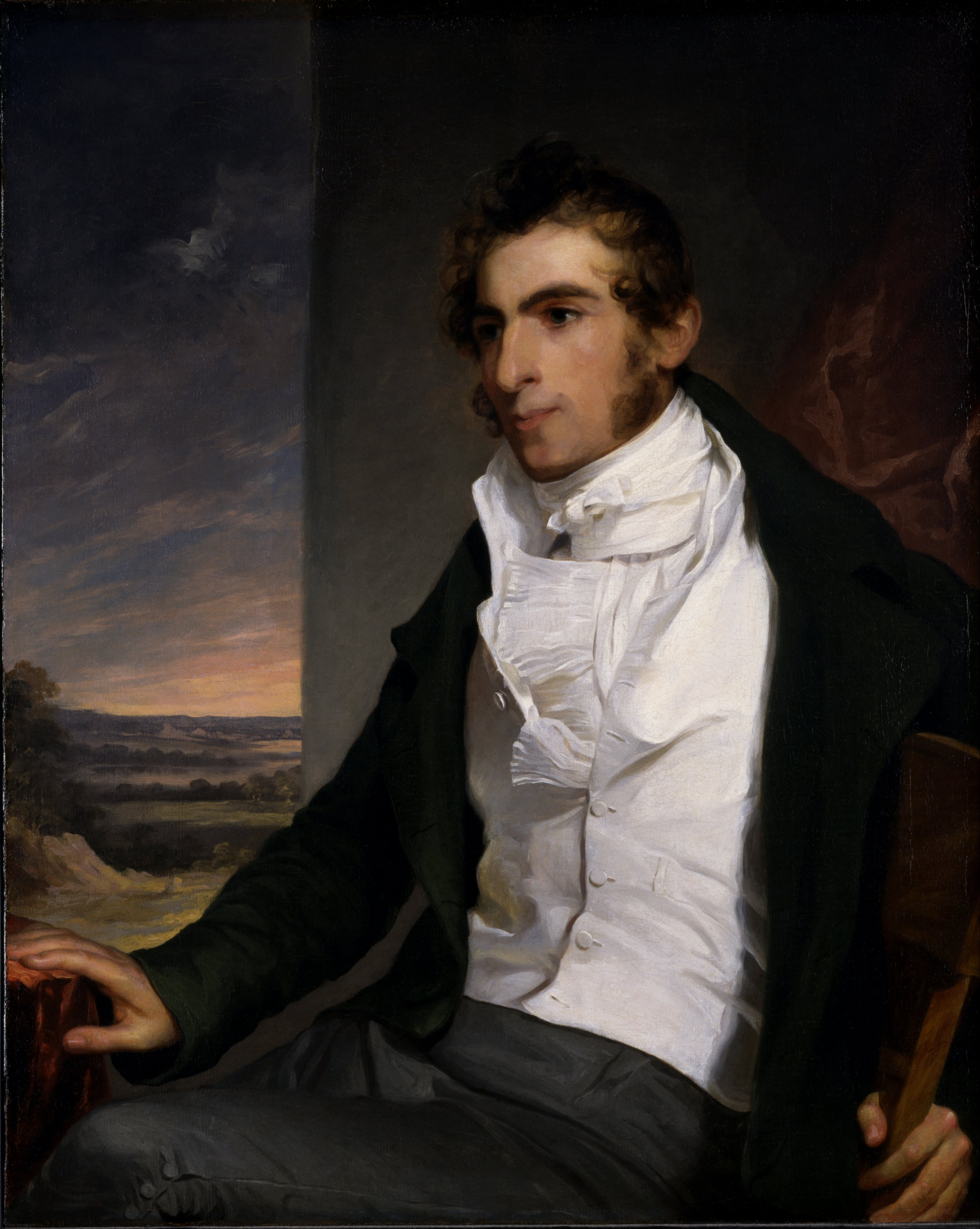
4 – 1812–13

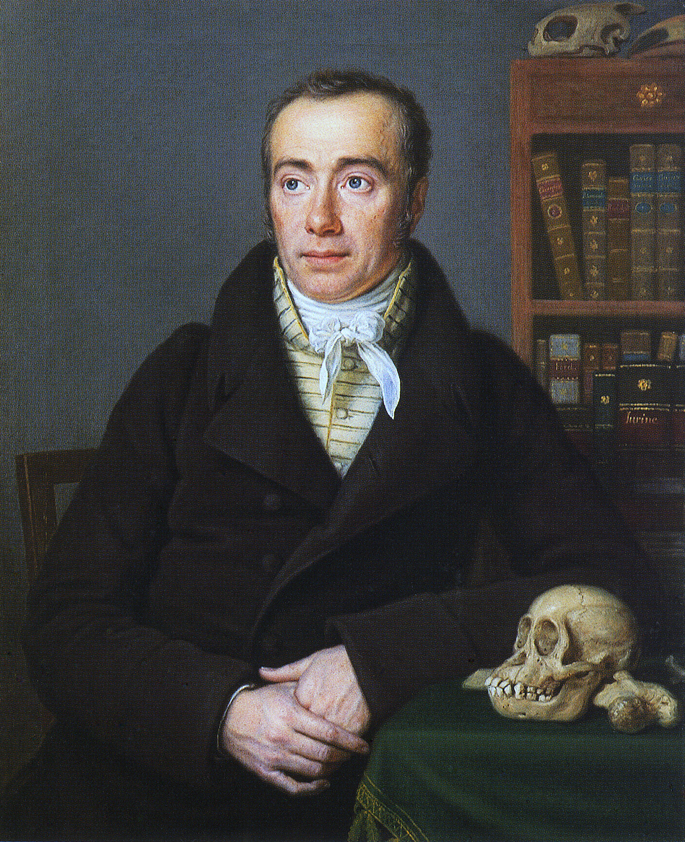
5 – 1813

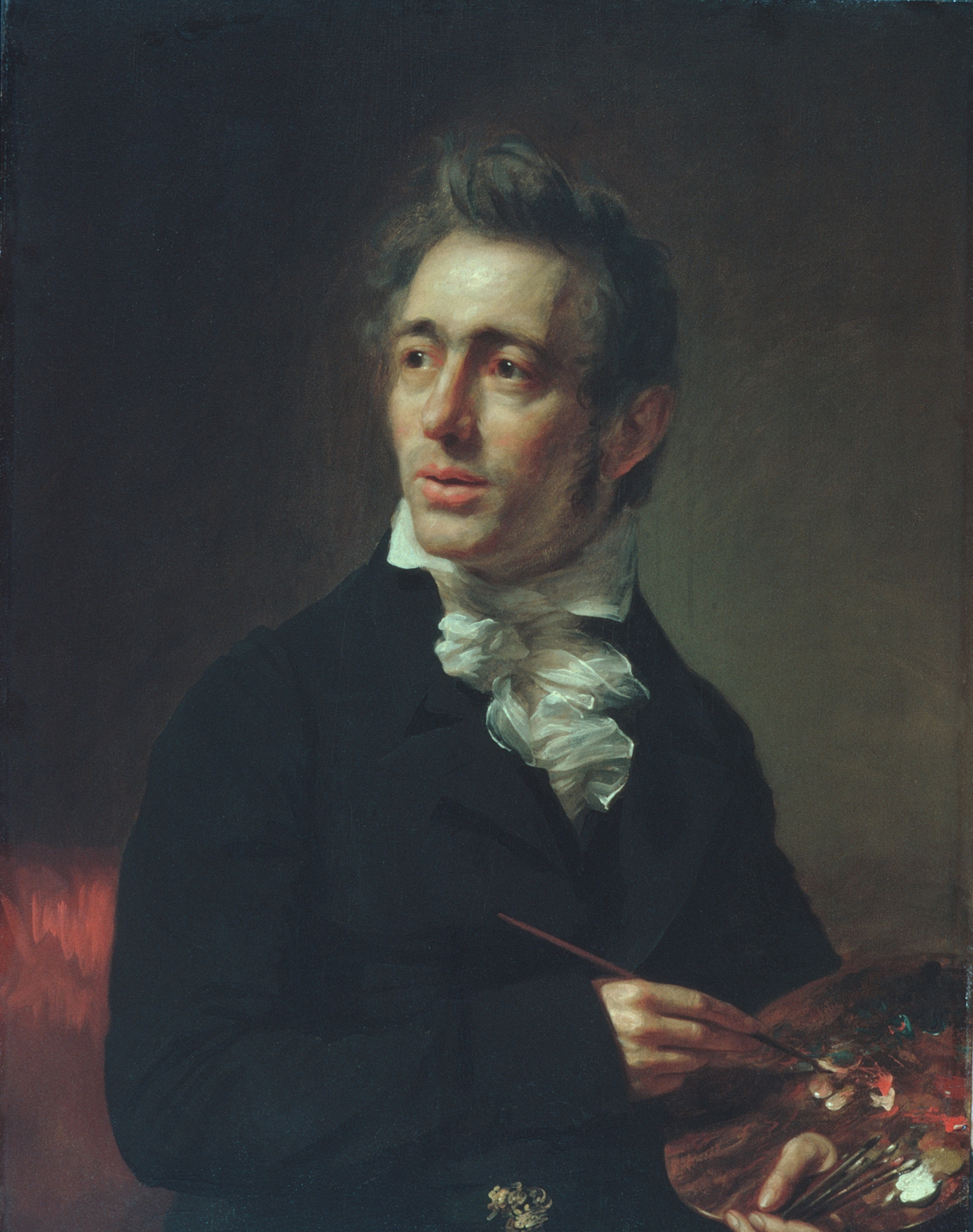
6 – 1815

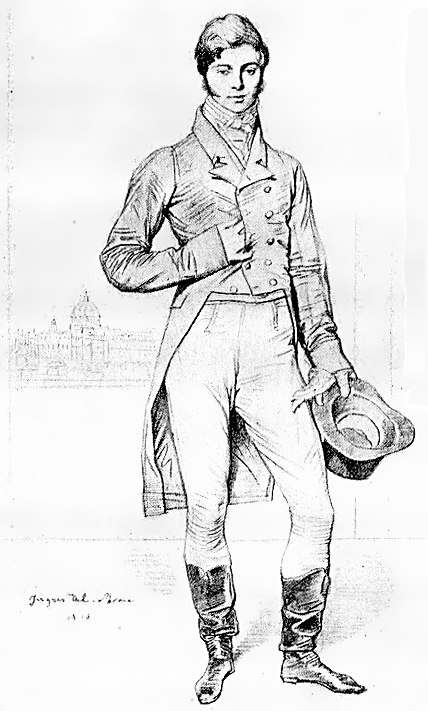
7 – 1816

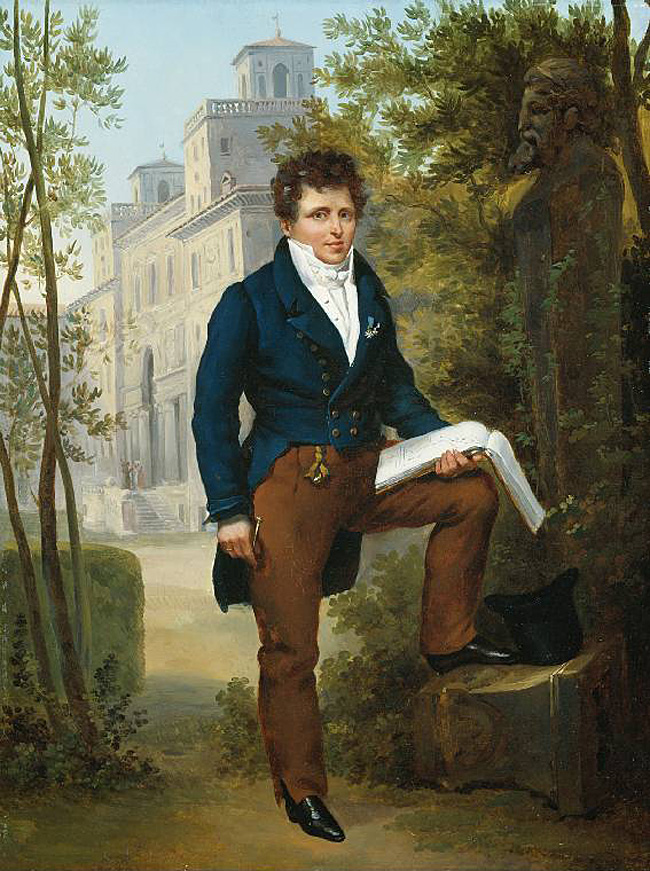
8 – 1817

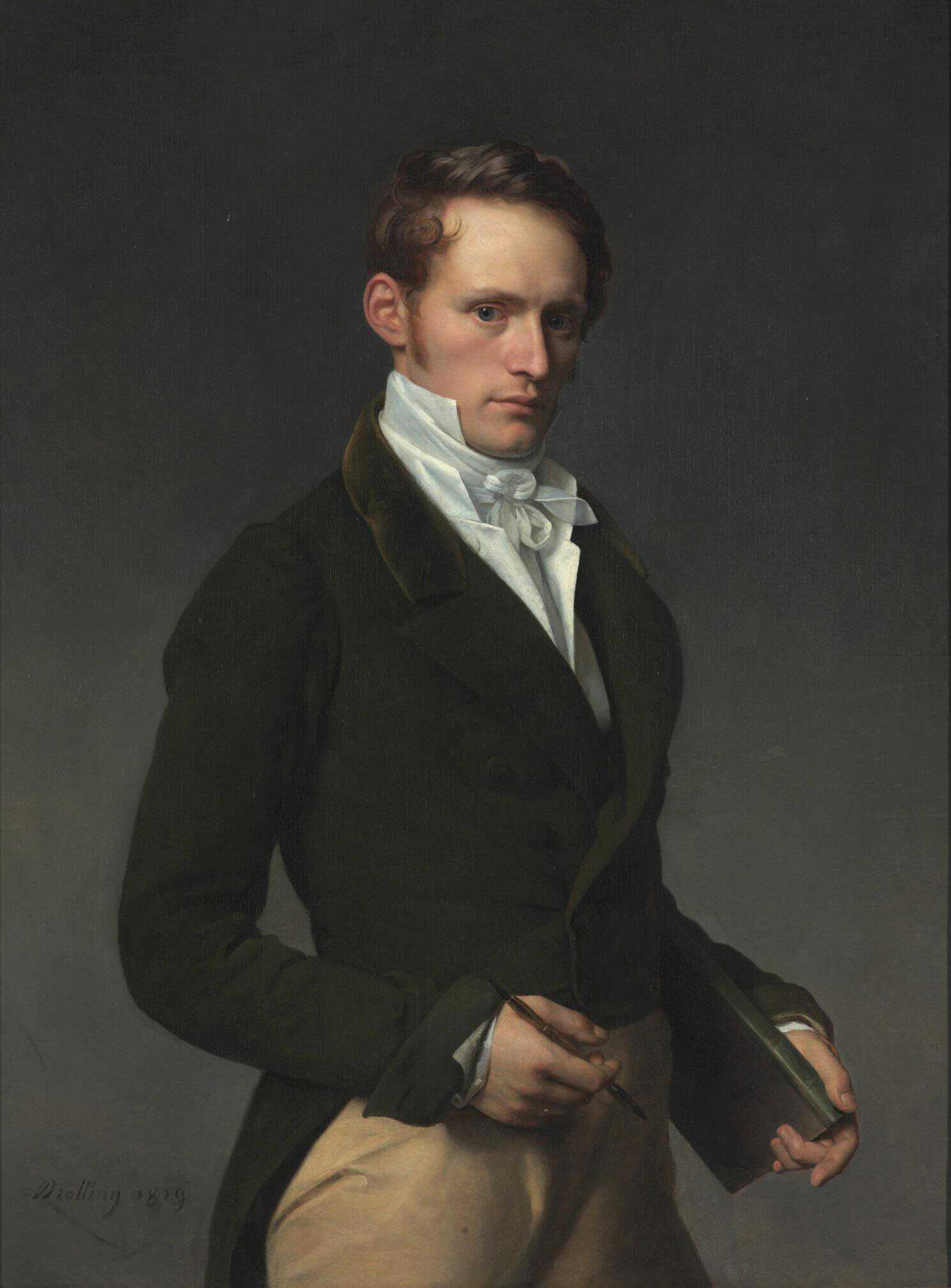
9 – 1819
1. Les Modernes Incroyables, a satire on French fashions of 1810; long tight breeches or pantaloons, short coats with tails, and massive cravats.
2. Marcotte d'Argenteuil wears a high-collared shirt with a dark cravat, a buff waistcoat, a double-breasted brown coat with covered buttons, and a dark gray overcoat with contrasting collar (perhaps sealskin). 1810. His bicorne hat lies on the table.
3. Back-facing figures demonstrating different male fashions, Paris, 1812.
4. Daniel la Motte, a Baltimore, Maryland, merchant and landowner, strikes a romantic pose that displays details of his white waistcoat, frilled shirt, and fall-front breeches with covered buttons at the knee, 1812–13.
5. German physician Johann Abraham Albers wears a striped waistcoat under a black double-breasted coat, 1813.
6. American artist Samuel Lovett Waldo wears a frilled shirt with a knotted white cravat.
7. Lord Grantham wears a double-breasted coat which shows a bit of the waistcoat beneath at the waist, tight pantaloons tucked into boots, and a high collar and cravat, 1816.
8. Nicolas-Pierre Tiolier wears a rich blue tailcoat and brown fall-front trousers over a white waistcoat, shirt, and cravat. His tall hat sits on an antique plinth, 1817.
9. Unknown artist wears a double-breasted tailcoat with turned-back cuffs and a matching high collar of velvet (or possibly fur). Note that, while the man's obvious wasp-like torso is not overly emphasized in a caricature-like fashion, as was often the case in male fashion plates of the day, there is a definite and deliberate nipping of the waist. It is highly likely that the sitter in this portrait wore some sort of tight-laced corset or similar undergarment. The coat-sleeves are puffed at the shoulder. He wears a white waistcoat, shirt, and cravat, and light-colored pantaloons, 1819.

== Children's fashion ==
Both boys and girls wore dresses until they were about four or five years old, when boys were "breeched", or put into trousers.

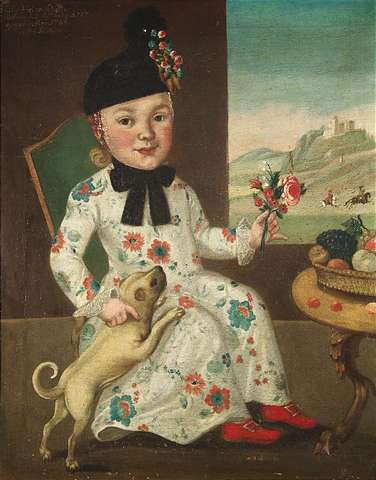
German boy aged three, 1769

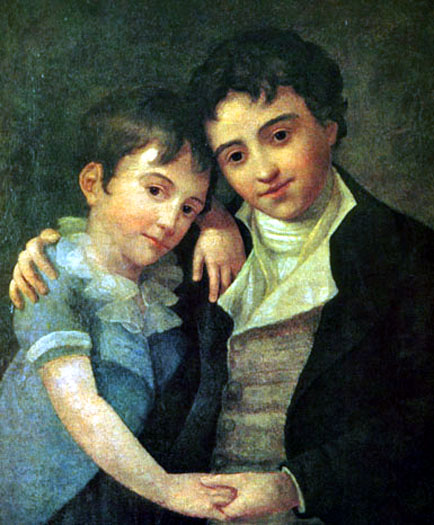
Mozart's sons, 1798

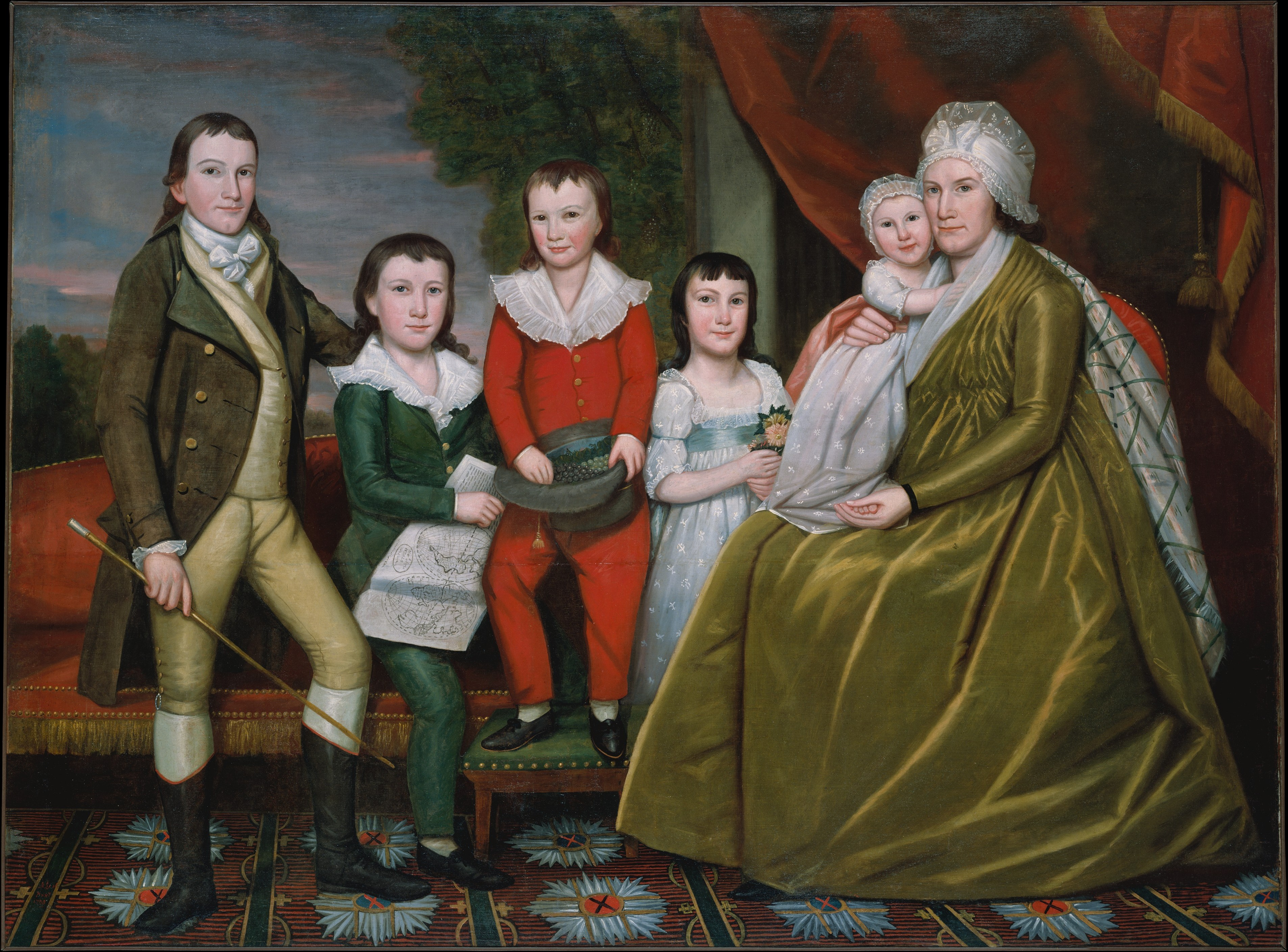
United States, 1798

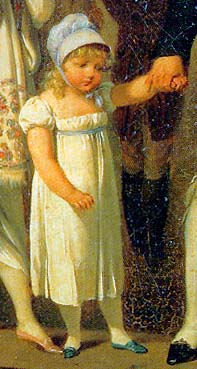
Young girl, Paris, c. 1803

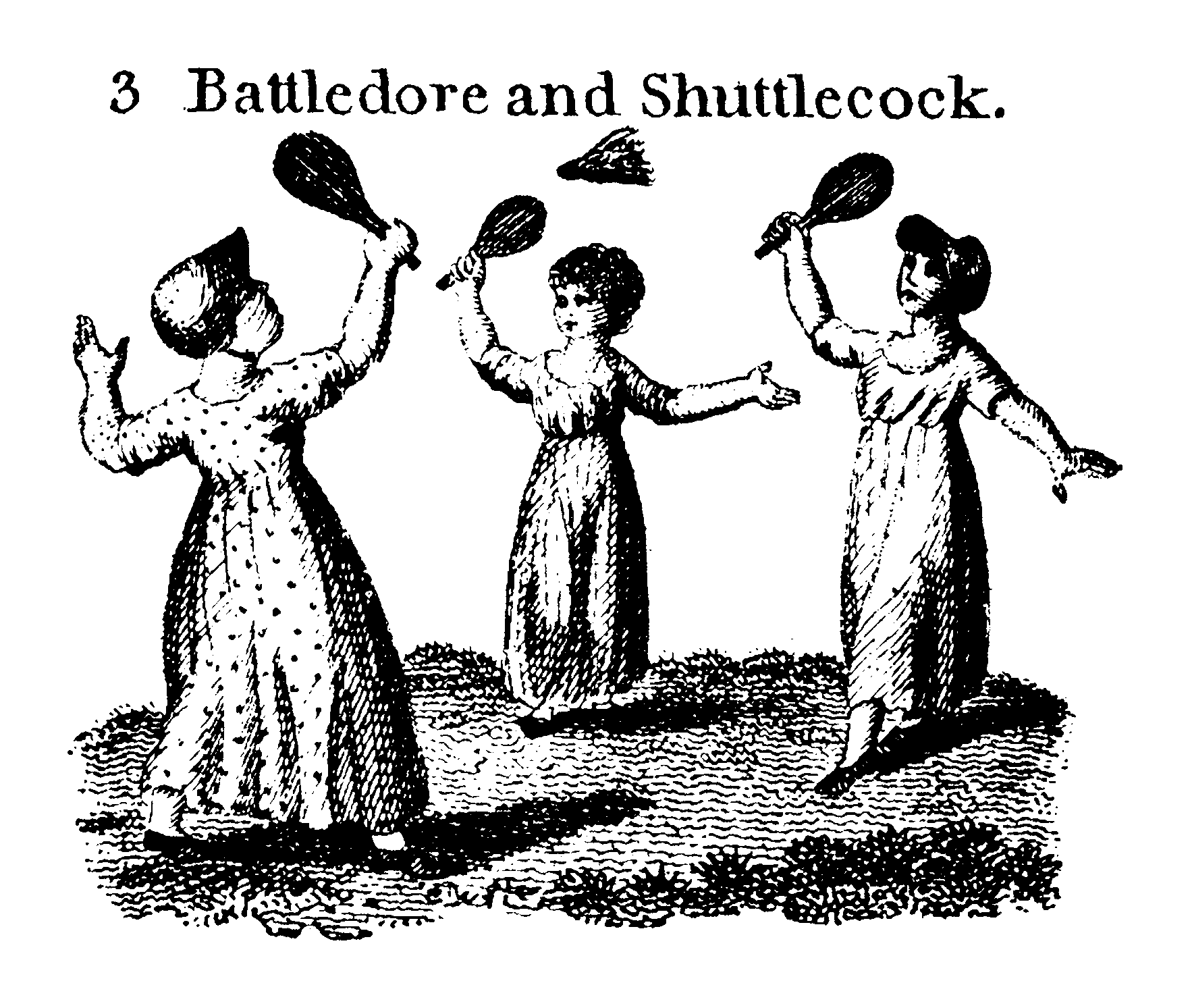
Girls play-dresses and bonnets, 1804

Skeleton suit, c. 1806

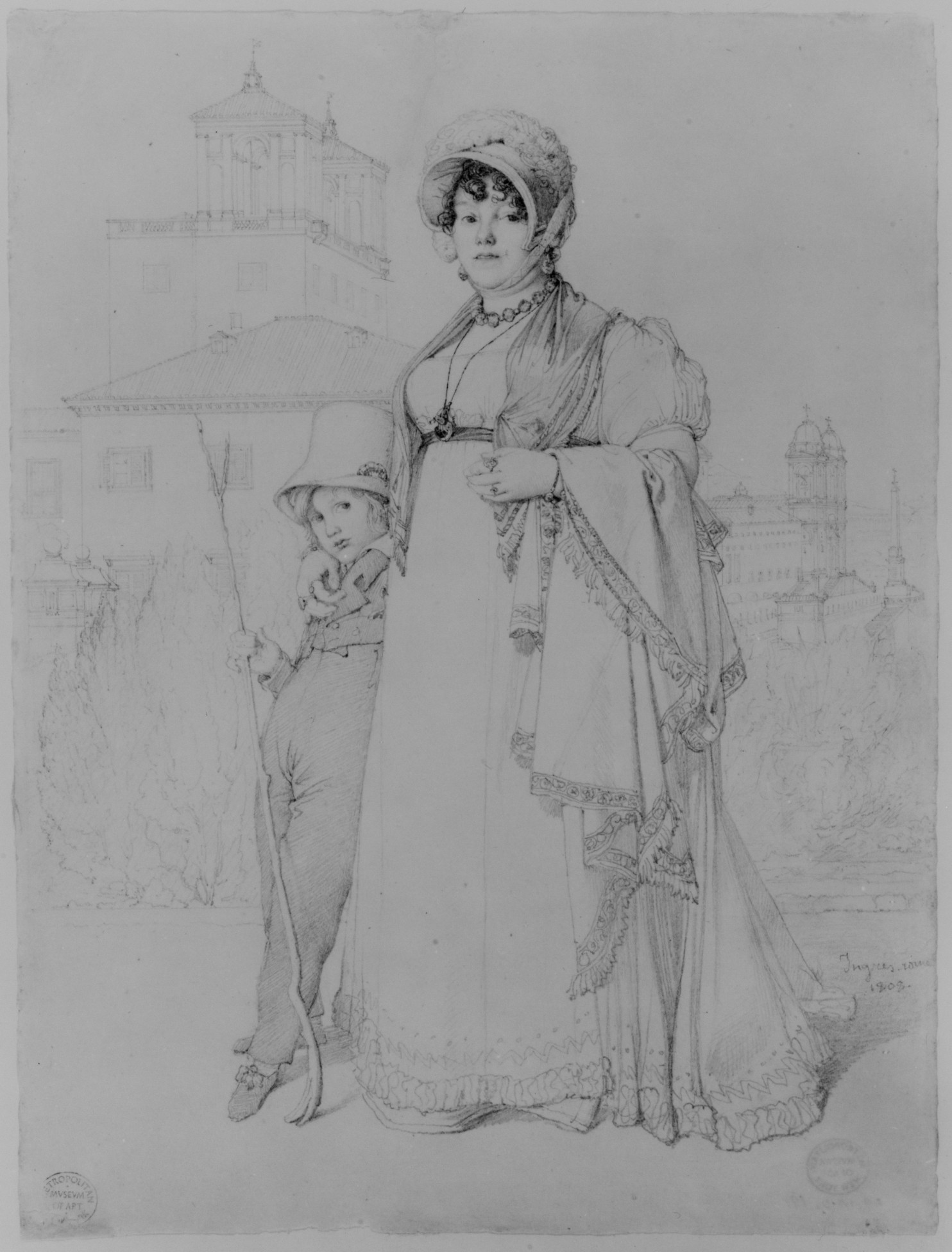
Skeleton suit, 1808

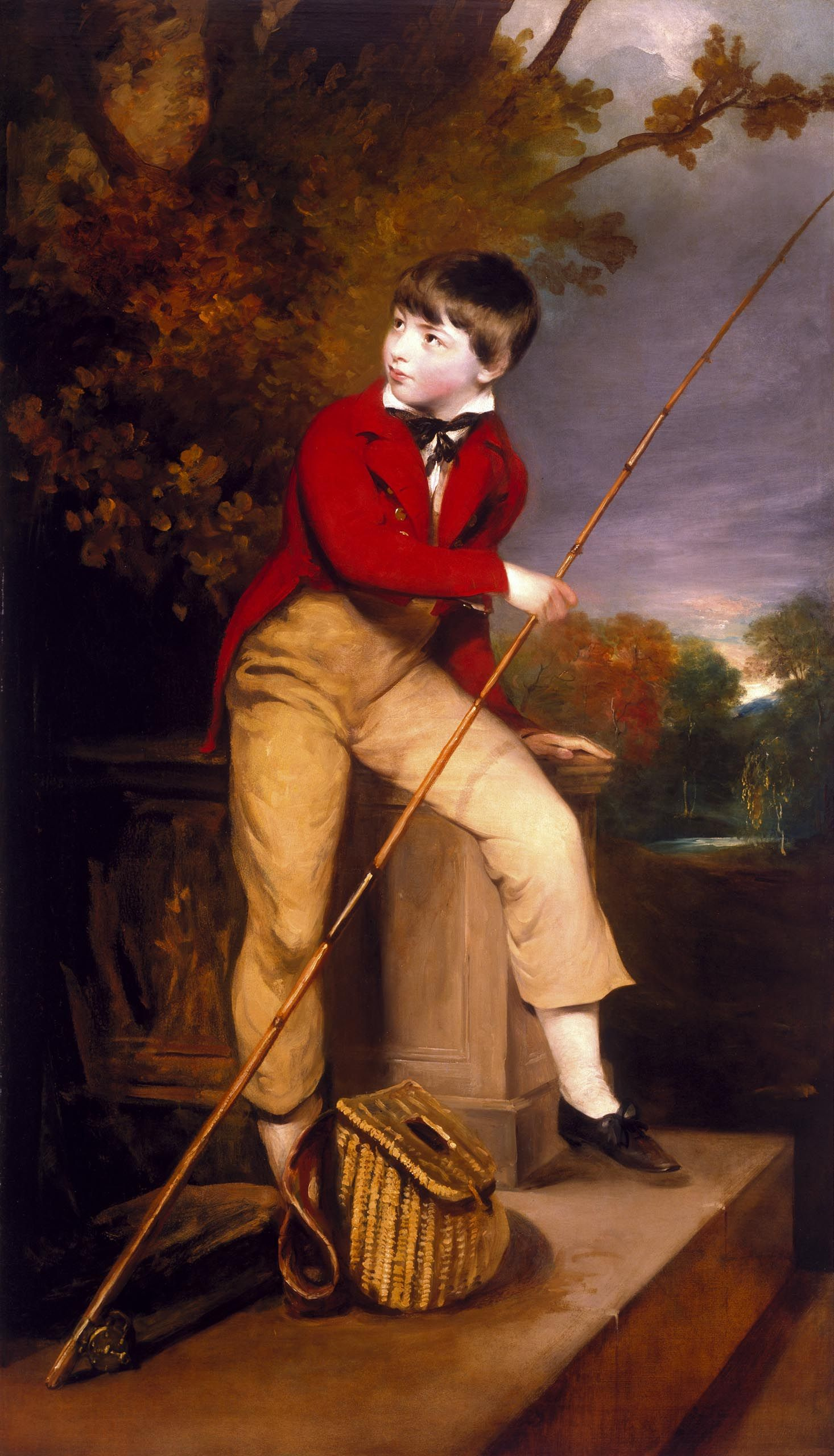
England, 1812

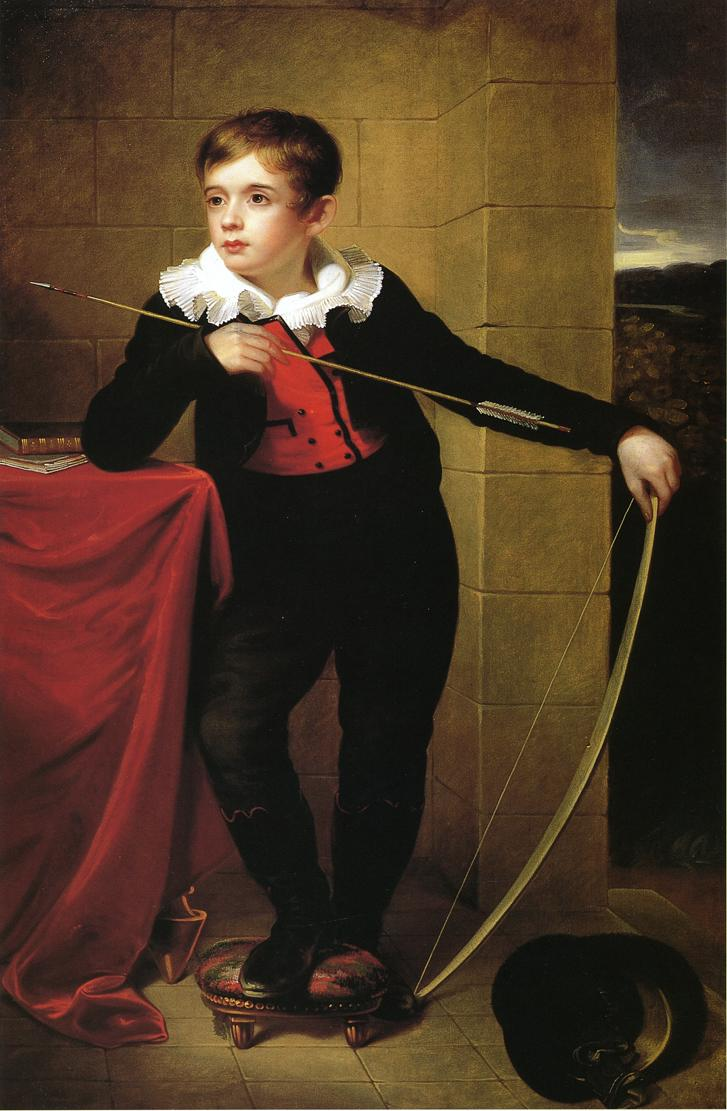
United States, 1812

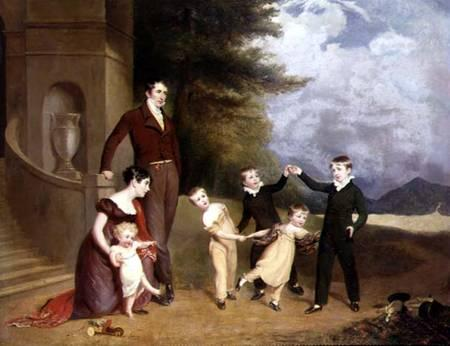
England, 1815

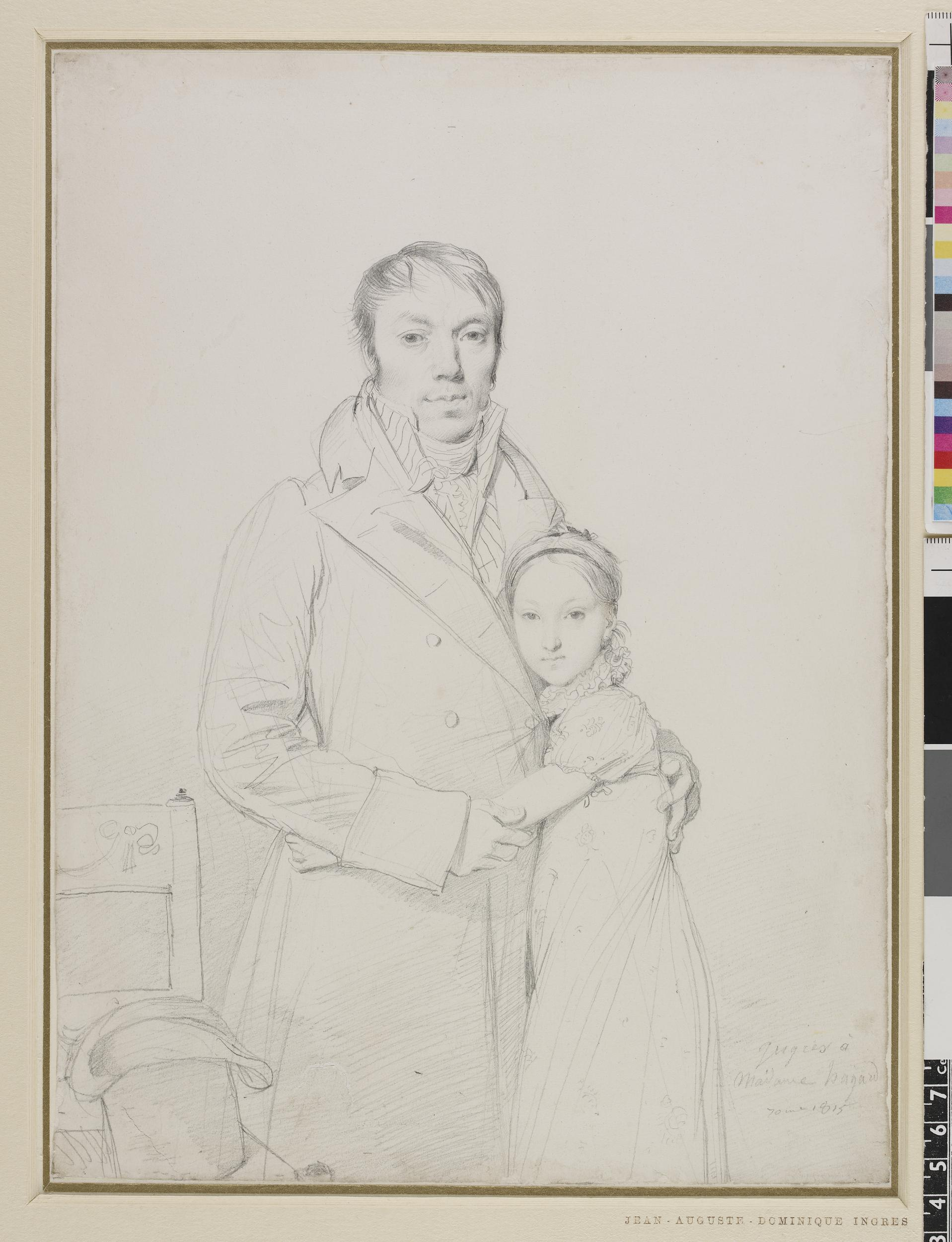
England, 1815

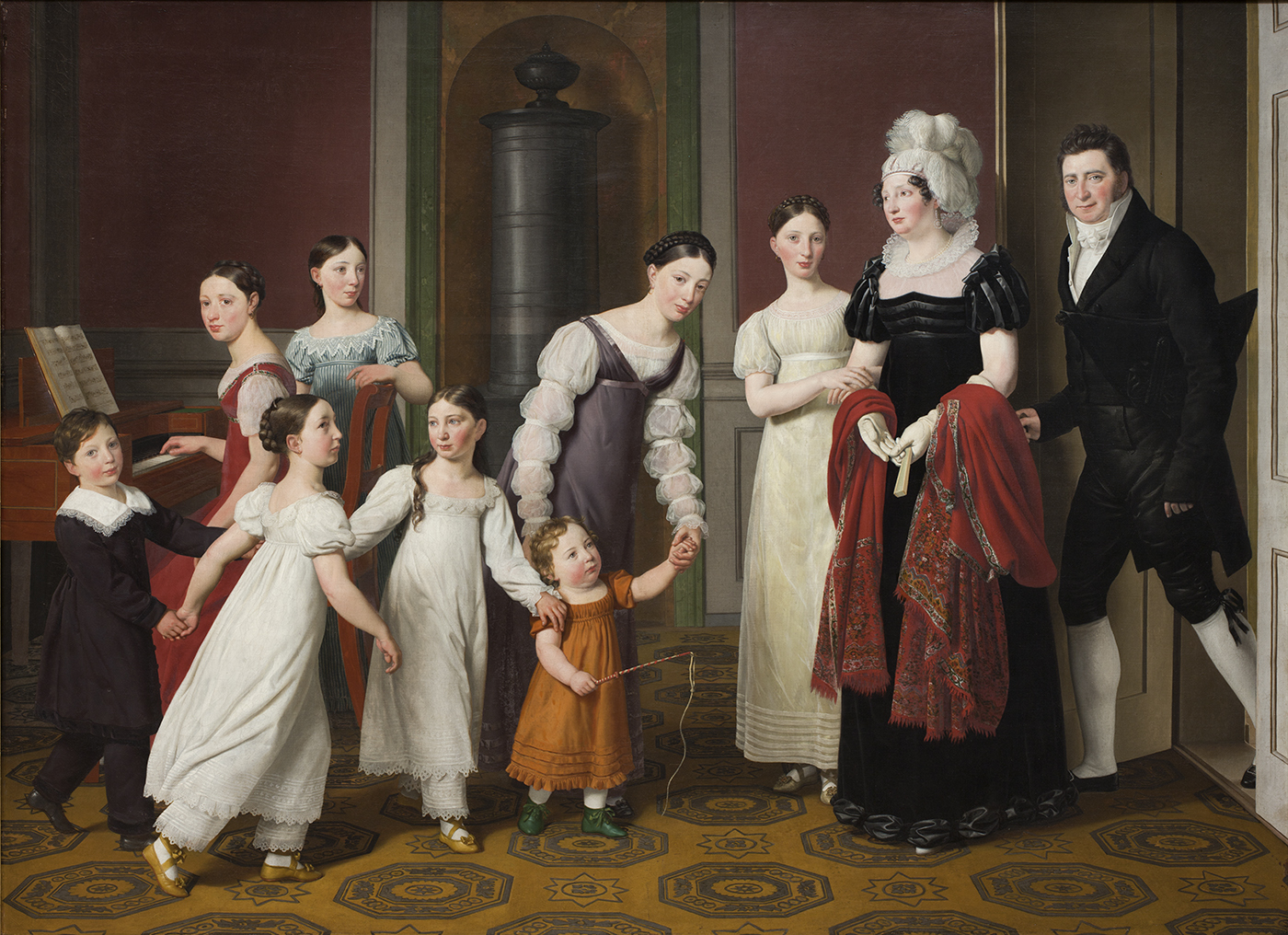
Denmark, 1818

== Revival of Directoire/Empire/Regency fashions ==
During the first half of the Victorian era, there was a more or less negative view of women's styles of the 1795–1820 period. Some people would have felt slightly uncomfortable to be reminded that their mothers or grandmothers had once promenaded about in such styles (which could be considered indecent according to Victorian norms), and many would have found it somewhat difficult to really empathize with (or take seriously) the struggles of a heroine of art or literature if they were being constantly reminded that she was wearing such clothes. For such reasons, some Victorian history paintings of the Napoleonic wars intentionally avoided depicting accurate women's styles (see example below), Thackeray's illustrations to his book Vanity Fair depicted the women of the 1810s wearing 1840s fashions, and in Charlotte Brontë's 1849 novel Shirley (set in 1811–1812) neo-Grecian fashions are anachronistically relocated to an earlier generation.

Later in the Victorian period, the Regency seemed to retreat to an unthreateningly remote historical distance, and Kate Greenaway and the Artistic Dress movement selectively revived elements of early 19th century fashions. During the late Victorian and Edwardian periods, many genre paintings, sentimental valentines, etc. contained loose depictions of 1795–1820 styles (then considered to be quaint relics of a bygone era). In the late 1960s / early 1970s, there was a limited fashion revival of the Empire silhouette.

In recent years, 1795–1820 fashions are most strongly associated with Jane Austen's writings, due to the various movie adaptations of her novels. There are also some Regency fashion urban myths, such as that women dampened their gowns to make them appear even more diaphanous (something which was certainly not practiced by the vast majority of women of the period).

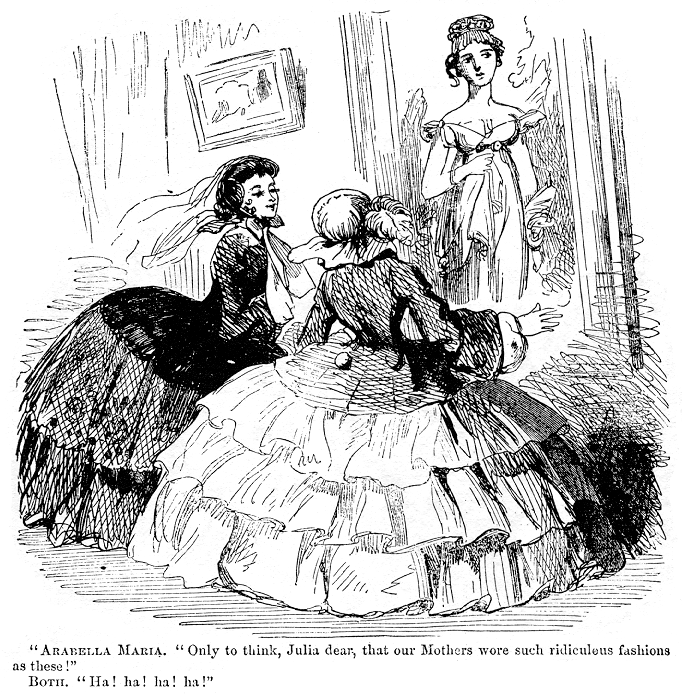
1 – 1857 cartoon

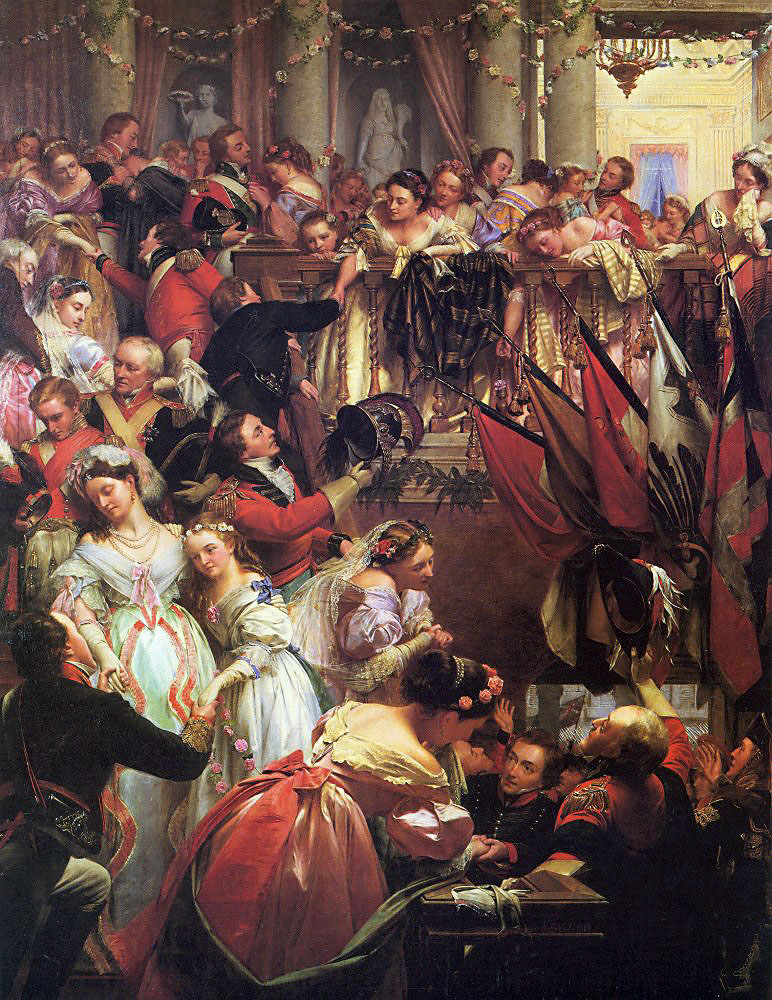
2 – 1868 denial

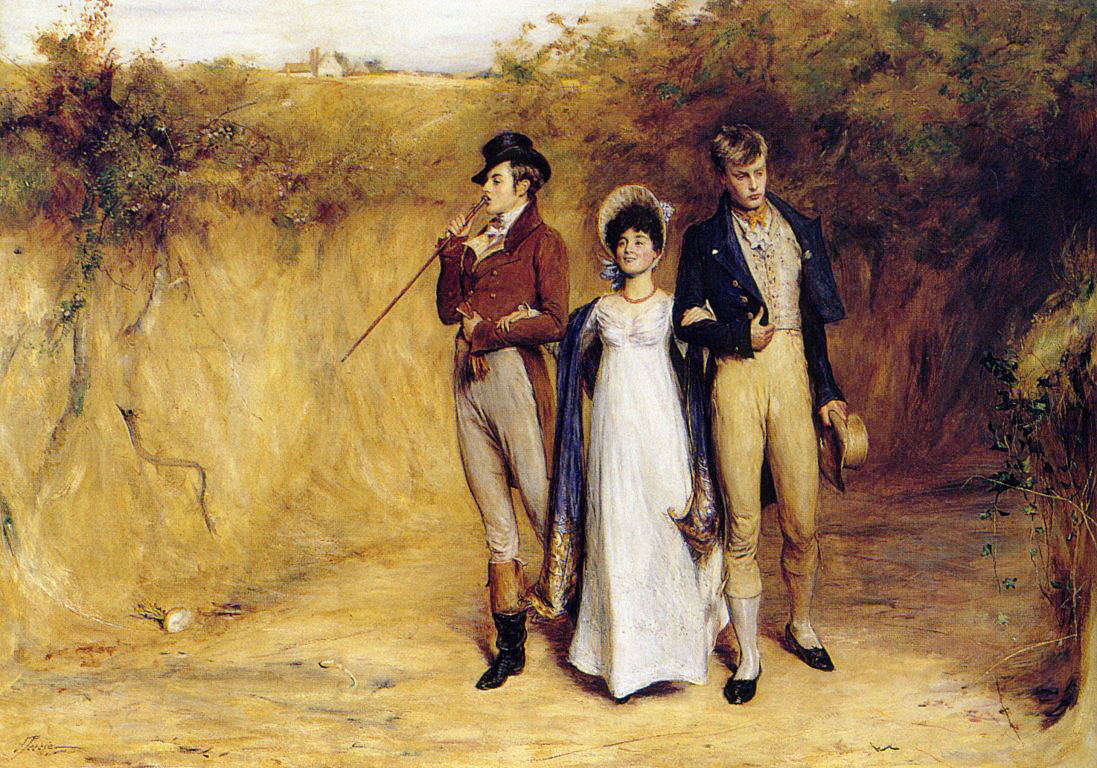
3 – 1882 nostalgia

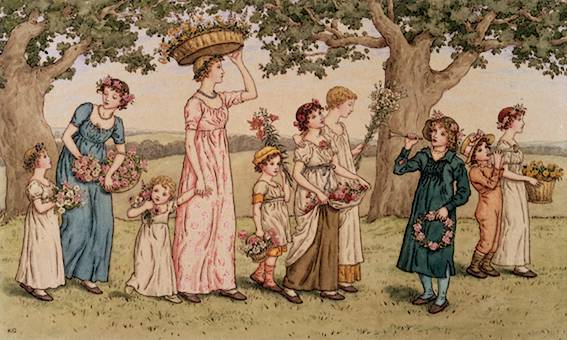
4 – Kate Greenaway
1. An 1857 cartoon making fun of the contemporary distaste for early 19th century clothes.
2. "Before Waterloo" by Henry Nelson O'Neil (1868), a mid-Victorian painting which deliberately does not show accurate women's styles of 1815.
3. "Two Strings to her Bow" by John Pettie (1882), a later Victorian genre painting which uses the Regency period for nostalgia value.
4. May Day by Kate Greenaway.

== See also ==
- Almack's
- Beau Brummell
- Corset controversy
- Dandy
- History of fashion
- Lady Caroline Lamb
- Regency dance
- Season (society)
- White's
